= Columbia =

Columbia most often refers to:

- Columbia (personification), the historical personification of the United States
- Columbia University, a private university in New York City
- Columbia Pictures, an American film studio owned by Sony Pictures
- Columbia Sportswear, an American clothing company
- Columbia, South Carolina, the state capital of South Carolina
- Columbia, Missouri, the fourth-most populous city in Missouri

Columbia may also refer to:

== Places ==
=== North America ===
==== Natural features ====
- Columbia Plateau, a geologic and geographic region in the U.S. Pacific Northwest
- Columbia River, in Canada and the US
  - Columbia Bar, a sandbar in the estuary of the Columbia River
  - Columbia Country, the region of British Columbia encompassing the northern portion of that river's upper reaches
    - Columbia Valley, a region within the Columbia Country
  - Columbia Lake, a lake at the head of the Columbia River
    - Columbia Wetlands, a protected area near Columbia Lake
  - Columbia Slough, along the Columbia watercourse near Portland, Oregon
- Glacial Lake Columbia, a proglacial lake in Washington state
- Columbia Icefield, in the Canadian Rockies
- Columbia Island (District of Columbia), in the Potomac River
- Columbia Island (New York), in Long Island Sound

==== Populated places ====
- Columbia City (disambiguation)
- Columbia County (disambiguation)
- District of Columbia (disambiguation), including "Columbia District"
- Columbia Township (disambiguation)
- Mount Columbia (disambiguation)

=== Canada ===
- British Columbia, a province of Canada
- Columbia District, a Hudson's Bay Company fur trading district in the Pacific Northwest
- Columbia, British Columbia, a former city in Canada
- Columbia (electoral district), formerly in British Columbia, 1903–1928
- Columbia Street, New Westminster, the main downtown street of that city, in British Columbia

=== United States ===
- District of Columbia, the United States' capital district
- Columbia, Alabama, a town
- Columbia, Arizona, a populated place
- Columbia, California, a census-designated place and former boomtown
- Columbia, San Diego, California, a neighborhood
- Columbia, Connecticut, a town
- Columbia, Illinois, a city
- Columbia, Fayette County, Indiana, an unincorporated town
- Columbia, Iowa, an unincorporated community
- Columbia, Kentucky, a city
- Columbia, Louisiana, a town
- Columbia, Maine, a town
- Columbia, Maryland, a planned community
- Columbia, Michigan, a village
- Columbia, Mississippi, a city
- Columbia, Missouri, a city
  - Columbia metropolitan area (Missouri)
- Columbia, New Hampshire, a town
- Columbia, New Jersey, a census-designated place
- Columbia, New York, a town
- Columbia, North Carolina, a town
- Columbia, Tuscarawas County, Ohio, an unincorporated community
- Columbia, Williams County, Ohio, an unincorporated community
- Columbia, Pennsylvania, a borough
- Columbia, South Carolina, the capital of South Carolina
  - Columbia metropolitan area (South Carolina)
- Columbia, South Dakota, a city
- Columbia, Tennessee, a city
- Columbia, Virginia, a town
- Columbia (Richmond, Virginia), a historic home
- Camp Columbia (Hanford), Washington state, a prison camp during and after World War II
- Columbia, West Virginia
- Columbia, Wisconsin, an unincorporated community
- Columbia, former name of Romney, Indiana, an unincorporated community
- Columbia, former name of Etna, New York, an unincorporated community
- Columbia, former name of West Columbia, Texas, a city

=== Elsewhere ===
- Washingtonia (colony), a Greek refugee colony established in 1829, later named Washingtonia
- Columbia, Queensland, a locality in Australia
- Camp Columbia (Wacol), Queensland, Australia, during World War II
- Columbia, Tyne and Wear, UK, a village subdivision of the town of Washington
- Columbia (supercontinent), a prehistoric supercontinent
- 327 Columbia, an asteroid

== Arts, entertainment and media ==
=== Fictional elements ===
- Columbia (BioShock), a city in the video game BioShock Infinite
- Columbia, a character in the movie The Rocky Horror Picture Show
- Columbia Airlines, from the movie Airport 1975

=== Music ===
- Columbia, a style of Cuban rumba
- Columbia: Live at Missouri University, a 1993 live album by the American power pop group Big Star
- "Columbia" (Oasis song), a song on the 1994 album Definitely Maybe
- "Columbia", a song on the 2000 album Out There and Back by Paul van Dyk
- "Columbia", a song on the 2005 album Bloom by Eric Johnson
- "Columbia, the Gem of the Ocean", an American patriotic song

=== Publications ===
- Columbia Encyclopedia, one-volume encyclopedia published by Columbia University Press
- Columbia: A Journal of Literature and Art, annual literary journal published by Columbia University
- Columbia Magazine, an alumni magazine published by Columbia University
- Columbia: The Magazine of Northwest History, quarterly magazine published by the Washington State Historical Society
- Columbia, a magazine published by the Knights of Columbus
- Columbia Magazine, an online magazine published in Columbia, Kentucky

== Companies ==
=== Arts and media companies ===
- Columbia Amusement Company, an American burlesque chain that operated from 1902 to 1927
- Columbia Artists Management, an international talent management agency
- Columbia Broadcasting System, original name of American broadcast network, CBS; initially Columbia Phonographic Broadcasting System (1927–1928), then Columbia Broadcasting System, Inc. (1928–1974), now CBS Inc. (1974–present)
- Columbia Comics, an American comic book publisher
- Columbia Games, an American board game company
- Columbia Graphophone Company, a British record company and label from 1922 to 1973
- Columbia House, an American mail-order media company
- Columbia Pictures, a movie studio owned by Sony
- Columbia Museum of Art, an art museum in Columbia, South Carolina
- Nippon Columbia, formerly Columbia Music Entertainment, a Japanese record company
- Columbia Records, an American record label founded in 1888, owned since 1988 by Sony Music Entertainment
- Columbia TriStar Television, a former American television production and distribution company, re-incorporated as Sony Pictures Television in 2002
- Columbia University Press, affiliated with Columbia University and publisher of Columbia Encyclopedia
- Sony Pictures Home Entertainment, a home video distribution company of Sony formerly known as Columbia TriStar Home Video until 2001 Columbia TriStar Home Entertainment until 2004

=== Transportation companies ===
- Columbia Aircraft, American manufacturer active 1995-2007, taken over by Cessna
- Columbia Aircraft Corporation, American manufacturer active 1927-1947, originally Columbia Air Liners Inc.
- Columbia Bicycles of Hartford, Connecticut
  - Columbia (automobile brand) (1899–1913), originally expanded from the bicycle line
- Columbia Helicopters, based in Aurora, Oregon
- Columbia Motors of Detroit, Michigan (1917–1924)
- Columbia Railway, a historic Washington, D.C. streetcar company
- Columbia Transit (COMO Connect), a bus company serving Columbia, Missouri
- Columbia Transportation, the university bus system of Columbia University

=== Other companies ===
- Columbia Brewery in Canada
- Columbia Data Products, a software company in Florida
- Columbia Forest Products, a forest manufacturing company in North Carolina
- Columbia Gas Transmission, a gas pipeline between the U.S. Gulf Coast and New York
- Columbia Industries, a bowling manufacturing company
- Columbia Insurance Group, an insurance company
- Columbia Machine, an American company
- Columbia Management Group, a financial services company
- Columbia Mining Company, amalgamated in 2001 with Teck Resources as Teck-Cominco
- Columbia Power Corporation, Canada
- Columbia Restaurant, Florida
- Columbia Sportswear, an American company that manufactures and distributes outerwear, sportswear, footwear, headgear, camping equipment, ski apparel, and outerwear accessories

== People ==
- Al Columbia (born 1970), American artist, writer and cartoonist
- Columbia Eneutseak (or Nancy Columbia; 1893–1959), American actress and screenwriter
- Columbia Lancaster (1803–1893), a delegate from the Territory of Washington
- Columbia Mishra, Indian-American aerospace engineer, named for the Space Shuttle

== Education ==
=== Schools ===
- Columbia Lions, athletic teams representing the university
- Columbia International University, Columbia, South Carolina
- Columbia College (disambiguation)
- Columbia Bible College, Abbotsford, British Columbia
- Columbia Theological Seminary, formerly in Columbia, now in Decatur, Georgia
- Columbia Grammar & Preparatory School, New York City
- Columbia High School (disambiguation)
- Columbia Independent School, Columbia, Missouri
- Columbia Middle School in Grovetown, Georgia
- Columbia University, a former name of the University of Portland

=== School districts ===
- Columbia Elementary School District, Redding, California
- Columbia School District (Mississippi)
- Columbia Public Schools, Columbia, Missouri

== Aircraft and spacecraft ==
- Space Shuttle Columbia
  - Space Shuttle Columbia disaster
- Command Module Columbia, the Command/Service Module for the Apollo 11 mission
- Columbia XJL, a large amphibian aircraft built only as three prototypes
- Columbia (ship)

== Other uses ==
- Columbia (carousel), two carousels at Great America parks owned by Six Flags
- Columbia sheep, an American breed
- Columbia (supercomputer), named for the space shuttle
- Columbia, another name for the 2-4-2 classification of steam locomotives
- Sailing Ship Columbia, a themed ride at Disneyland
- Team Columbia, a professional cycling team sponsored by Columbia Sportswear
- Columbia (Hewlett-Packard), a codename for the HP OmniGo 700LX palmtop PC

== See also ==
- Miss Columbia (disambiguation)
- Columbia Center (disambiguation)
- Columbia Mall (disambiguation)
- Columbia TriStar (disambiguation)
- Colombia (disambiguation)
- Colombian (disambiguation)
- Colombiana (disambiguation)
- Colombo (disambiguation)
- Columba (disambiguation)
- Columbiad, a type of large-caliber cannon from the 19th century
- Columbian (disambiguation)
- Columbiana (disambiguation)
- Columbus (disambiguation)
- Columba, saint
- Columbanus, saint
- Columbium, former name for the element Niobium
