= Columbia School District =

Columbia School District or variation, may refer to:

- Columbia Elementary School District, Reading, California, USA
- Columbia Union School District, Tuolumne County, California, USA
- Columbia County School District, Lake City, County of Columbia, Florida, USA
- Columbia School District (Mississippi), USA
- Columbia Public Schools, Columbia, Boone County, Missouri, USA
- Columbia Borough School District, Borough of Columbia, Lancaster County, Pennsylvania, USA
- Columbia-Brazoria Independent School District, West Columbia, Texas, USA
- District of Columbia Public Schools, school district of Washington, DC, USA
- School District 20 Kootenay-Columbia, British Columbia, Canada

== See also ==
- District of Columbia (disambiguation) and Columbia District
- Columbia (disambiguation)
