= District of Columbia (disambiguation) =

The District of Columbia is a U.S. federal district which contains the national capital of the City of Washington.

District of Columbia, Columbia District or other variants/similarities, may also refer to:

== Washington, D.C., related ==
- District of Columbia (until 1871)
- District of Columbia's at-large congressional district (federal U.S. House of Representatives)
- District of Columbia County, Washington, D.C. treated as a county
- District of Columbia Public Schools, school district of Washington, D.C.
- University of the District of Columbia (founded 1851)
- University of the District of Columbia Community College (founded 1851)
- District of Columbia School of Law (founded 1986)
- District of Columbia General Hospital
- Miss District of Columbia (disambiguation), a beauty pageant title

== Other uses ==
- Columbia District, British North America; a former colonial district in the U.S. Pacific Northwest and Canadian Pacific regions, now mainly the province of British Columbia and state of Washington
- Columbia (electoral district), British Columbia, Canada; a provincial electoral district
- Columbia-Shuswap Regional District, British Columbia, Canada; a district containing Columbia Country
- Columbia Street Waterfront District, Brooklyn, NYC, NYS, US
- Columbia Historic District (disambiguation)
- Columbia School District (disambiguation)

== See also ==
- Washington district (disambiguation)
- Columbia Township (disambiguation)
- Columbia County (disambiguation)
- District (disambiguation)
- Columbia (disambiguation)
- Colombia (disambiguation)
  - Districts of Colombia
