= Capital District =

Capital District may refer to:

- Capital District (New York), metropolitan area surrounding Albany
- Capital districts and territories, specially designated administrative divisions
- Capital region, a region or district surrounding a capital city
- Capital District (Venezuela), a federal district
- Capital Regional District, a local government administrative district in British Columbia, Canada
- Capital District (VHSL), a district of the Virginia High School League

== See also ==
- Capital districts and territories
- Capital region (disambiguation)
  - National Capital Region (India), Delhi and its neighboring areas
- District (disambiguation)
- Capital (disambiguation)
- Capitol (disambiguation)
