= Sherbrooke County =

Sherbrooke County or County of Sherbooke may refer to:

- Sherbrooke County (Province of Canada electoral district), Lower Canada; a 19th-century riding in what is now Quebec, Canada
- Sherbrooke County Regional Municipality (French: La Région-Sherbrookoise MRC), Quebec, Canada; a county organized as a municipality, formerly the County of Sherbrooke

== See also ==
- Shire of Sherbrooke, Victoria, Australia; a former local government area
- Town of Sherbrooke, a former township (canton)-regional electoral district in Quebec, Canada
- Sherbrooke Township, Ontario, Canada; in Haldimand County
- North Sherbrooke Township, Ontario, Canada; in Lanark County
- South Sherbrooke Township, Ontario, Canada; in Lanark County
- Sherbrooke Township, Steele County, North Dakota, USA
- Sherbrooke (disambiguation)
- County (disambiguation)
