= Camp Columbia =

Camp Columbia – from an old poetic name for the United States – may refer to the following U.S. Army bases:

- Camp Columbia (Havana), during the First Occupation of Cuba
- Camp Columbia (Wacol), during World War II
- Camp Columbia (Hanford), a prison camp during and after World War II

Also: Camp Columbia State Park/State Forest
