= Columbia (personification) =

Female national personification of the United States

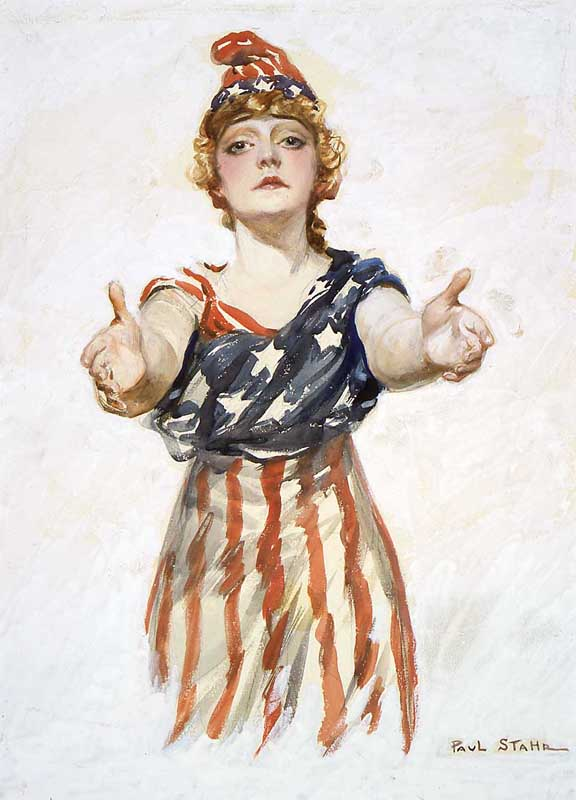
Paul Stahr's personified Columbia in an American flag gown and Phrygian cap, from a World War I patriotic poster (c. 1917)

Columbia (/kəˈlʌmbiə/; kə-LUM-bee-ə), also known as Lady Columbia or Miss Columbia, is a female national personification of the United States. It was also a historical name applied to the Americas and to the New World. The association has given rise to the names of many American places, objects, institutions and companies, including the District of Columbia; Columbia, South Carolina; Columbia University; "Hail, Columbia"; Columbia Rediviva; and the Columbia River. Images of the Statue of Liberty (Liberty Enlightening the World, erected in 1886) largely displaced personified Columbia as the female symbol of the United States by around 1920, and Lady Liberty was seen as both an aspect of Columbia and a rendition of the Goddess of Liberty. She is the central element of the logo of Hollywood film studio Columbia Pictures.

Columbia is a Neo-Latin toponym, used since the 1730s to refer to the Thirteen Colonies that would form the United States. It originated from the name of the Genoese explorer Christopher Columbus and from the Latin ending -ia, common in the Latin names of countries (paralleling Britannia, Gallia, Zealandia, and others).

== History ==
=== Early ===
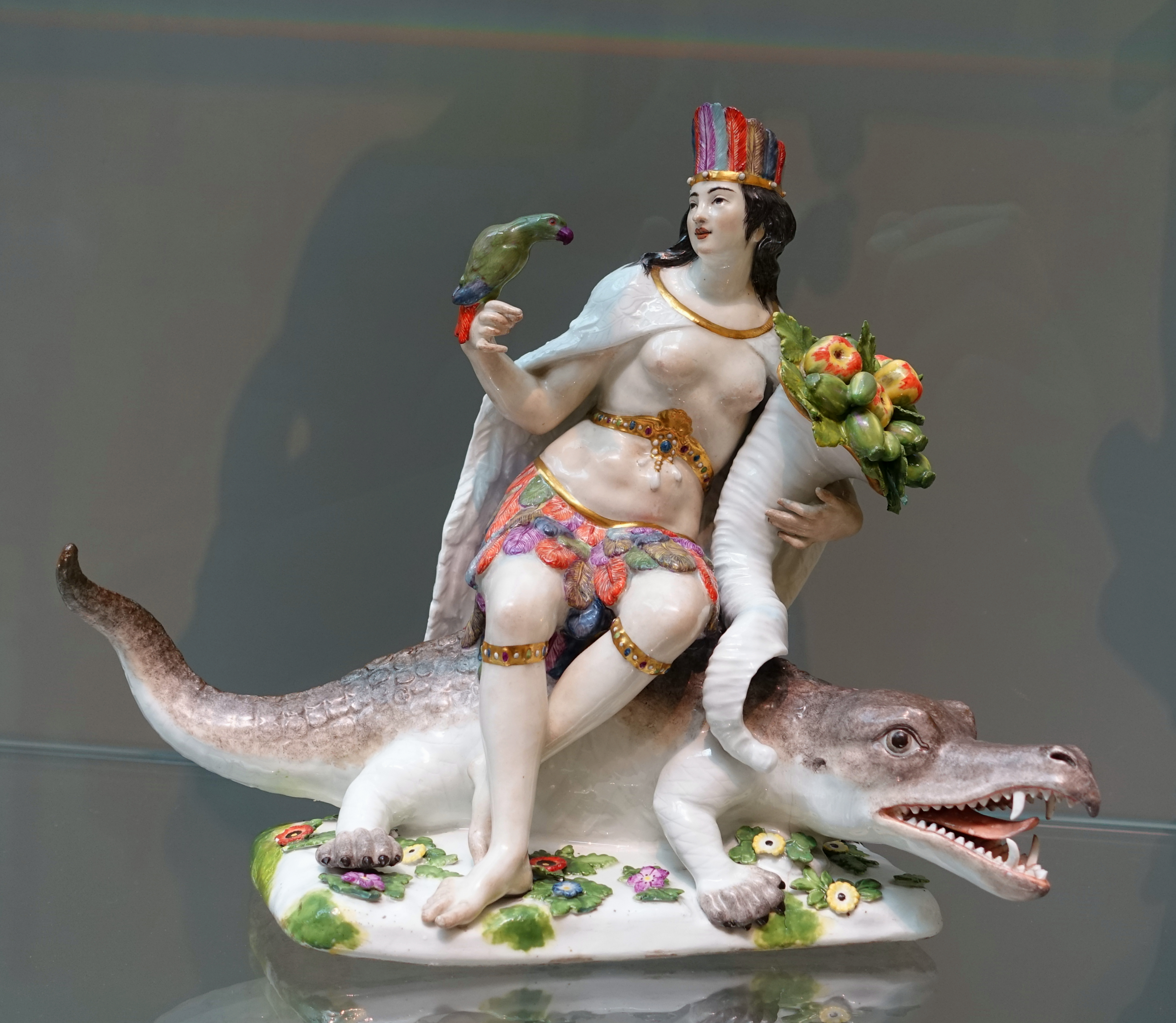
Personification of the Americas in Meissen porcelain, c. 1760, from a set of the Four Continents

The earliest type of personification of the Americas, seen in European art from the 16th century onwards, reflected the tropical regions in South and Central America from which the earliest European travelers reported back. Such images were most often used in sets of female personifications of the four continents. America was depicted as a woman who, like Africa, was only partly dressed, typically in bright feathers, which invariably formed her headdress. She often held a parrot, was seated on a caiman or alligator, with a cornucopia. Sometimes a severed head was a further attribute, or in prints scenes of cannibalism appeared in the background.

=== 18th century ===
Though versions of this depiction, tending as time went on to soften the rather savage image into an "Indian princess" type, and in churches emphasizing conversion to Christianity, served European artists well enough, by the 18th century they were becoming rejected by settlers in North America, who wanted figures representing themselves rather than the Native Americans they were often in conflict with.

Massachusetts Chief Justice Samuel Sewall used the name "Columbina" for the New World in 1697. The name "Columbia" for America first appeared in 1738 in the weekly publication of the debates of Parliament in Edward Cave's The Gentleman's Magazine. Publication of parliamentary debates was technically illegal, so the debates were issued under the thin disguise of Reports of the Debates of the Senate of Lilliput and fictitious names were used for most individuals and place names found in the record. Most of these were transparent anagrams or similar distortions of the real names and some few were taken directly from Jonathan Swift's Gulliver's Travels while a few others were classical or neoclassical in style. Such were Ierne for Ireland, Iberia for Spain, Noveborac for New York (from Eboracum, the Roman name for York) and Columbia for America—at the time used in the sense of "European colonies in the New World".

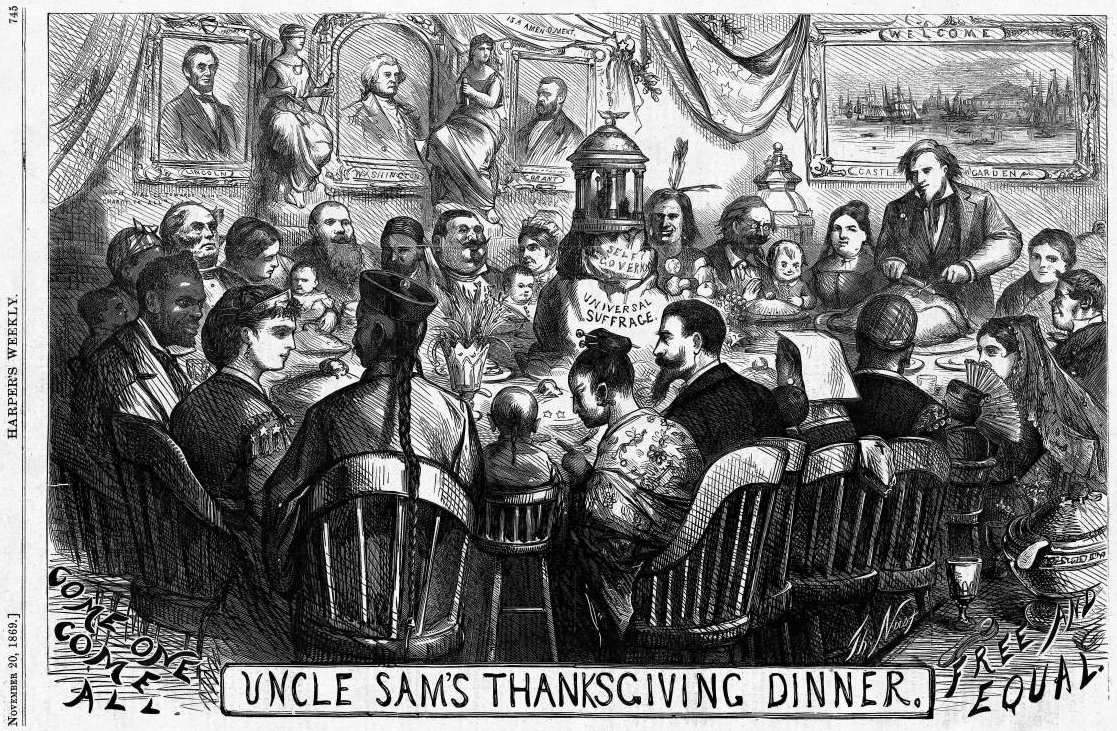
Columbia and an early rendition of Uncle Sam in an 1869 Thomas Nast cartoon having Thanksgiving dinner with a diverse group of immigrants

By the time of the Revolution, the name Columbia had lost the comic overtone of its Lilliputian origins and had become established as an alternative, or poetic, name for America. While the name America is necessarily scanned with four syllables, according to 18th-century rules of English versification Columbia was normally scanned with three, which is often more metrically convenient. For instance, the name appears in a collection of complimentary poems written by Harvard graduates in 1761 on the occasion of the marriage and coronation of King George III.

Behold, Britannia! in thy favour'd Isle;
At distance, thou, Columbia! view thy Prince,
For ancestors renowned, for virtues more;

The name Columbia rapidly came to be applied to a variety of items reflecting American identity. A ship built in Massachusetts in 1773 received the name Columbia Rediviva and it later became famous as an exploring ship and lent its name to new Columbias.

=== After independence ===
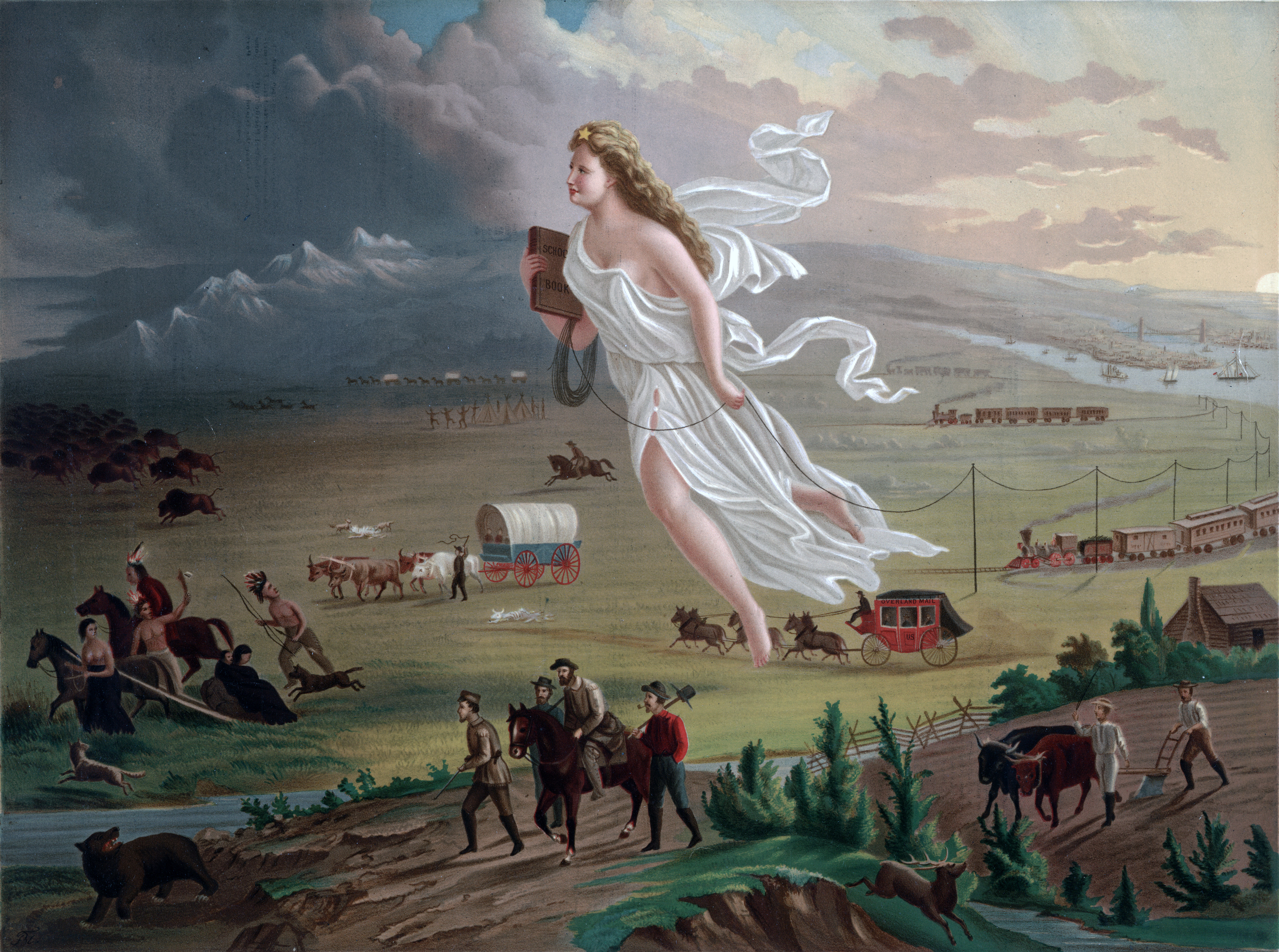
John Gast's 1872 painting American Progress depicts Columbia as the Spirit of the Frontier, carrying telegraph lines across the Western frontier to fulfill manifest destiny.

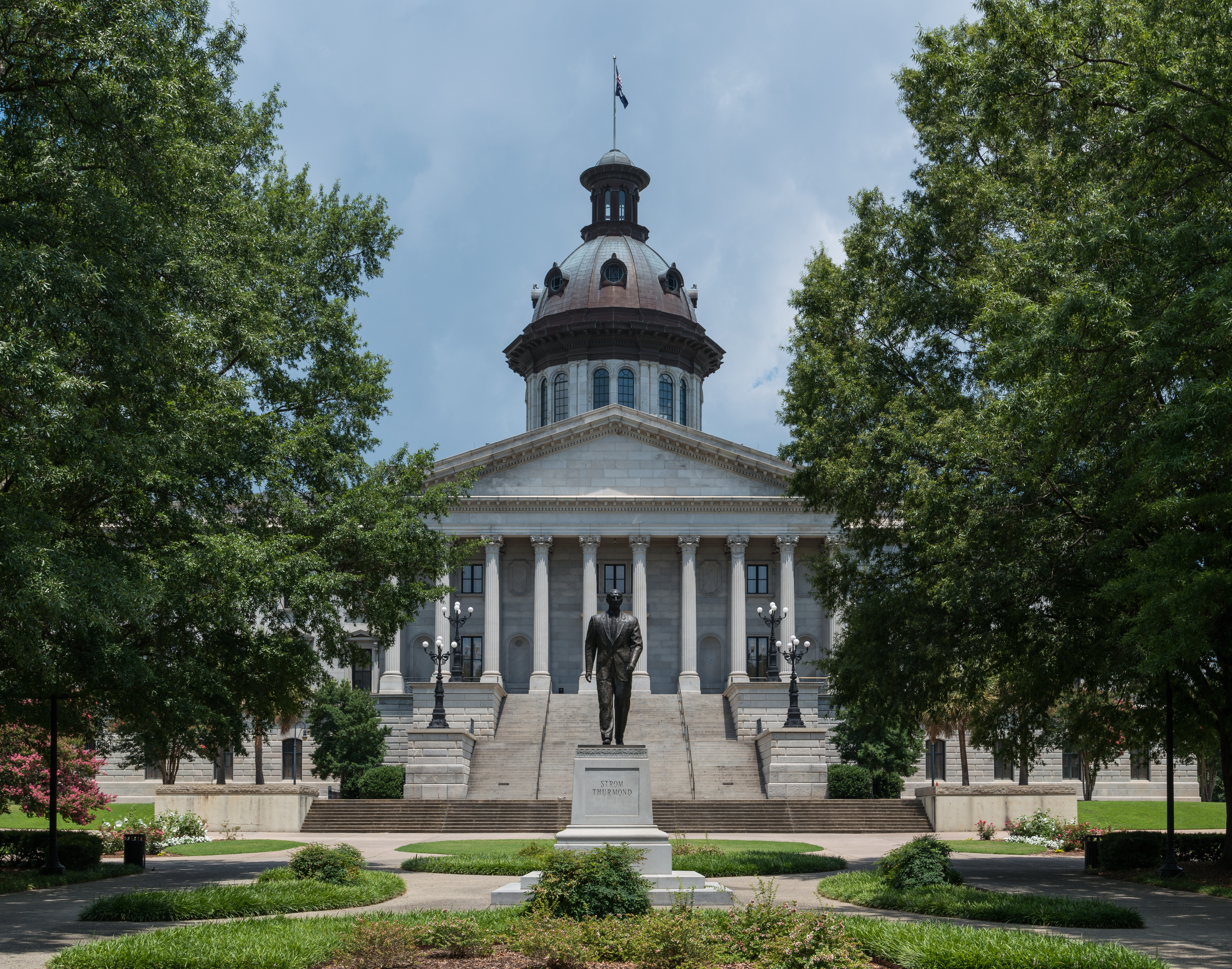
After the United States gained independence from Britain in the American Revolutionary War, the new capital city of South Carolina was Columbia.

With independence, the name became popular and was given to many counties, townships, and towns as well as other institutions.

- In 1784, the former King's College in New York City had its name changed to Columbia College, which became the nucleus of the present-day Ivy League Columbia University.
- In 1786, the name Columbia was given to the new capital city of South Carolina. Columbia is also the name of at least 19 other towns in the United States.
- Tammany Hall, also known as the Society of St. Tammany, the Sons of St. Tammany, or the Columbian Order, was a political organization founded in 1786 and incorporated on May 12, 1789, as the Tammany Society.
- In 1791, three commissioners appointed by President George Washington named the area destined for the seat of the United States government the territory of Columbia. In 1801, it was organized as the District of Columbia.
- In 1792, the Columbia Rediviva sailing ship gave its name to the Columbia River in the American Northwest (much later, the Rediviva gave its name to the Space Shuttle Columbia).
- In 1798, Joseph Hopkinson wrote lyrics for Philip Phile's 1789 inaugural president's march under the new title of "Hail, Columbia". Once used as de facto national anthem of the United States, it is now used as the entrance march of the Vice President of the United States.
- In 1819, a new country in the Americas was named Gran Colombia.
- In 1821, citizens of Boone County, Missouri, chose the name for their new city Columbia, Missouri,
- In 1865 Jules Verne's novel From the Earth to the Moon, the spacecraft to the Moon was fired from a giant Columbiad cannon.

In part, the more frequent usage of the name "Columbia" reflected a rising American neoclassicism, exemplified in the tendency to use Roman terms and symbols. The selection of the eagle as the national bird, the heraldric use of the eagle, the use of the term Senate to describe the upper house of Congress and the naming of Capitol Hill and the Capitol building were all conscious evocations of Roman precedents.

=== During Civil War ===
During the Civil War, the Union faced a coin shortage and issued Fractional currency depicting busts of George Washington and others, as well as allegorical figures such as Columbia and Liberty. The Confederacy also issued currency depicting allegorical figures such as Columbia and Liberty. However, Columbia depicted on these is very similar to the Progress of Civilization Pediment on the United States Capitol building.

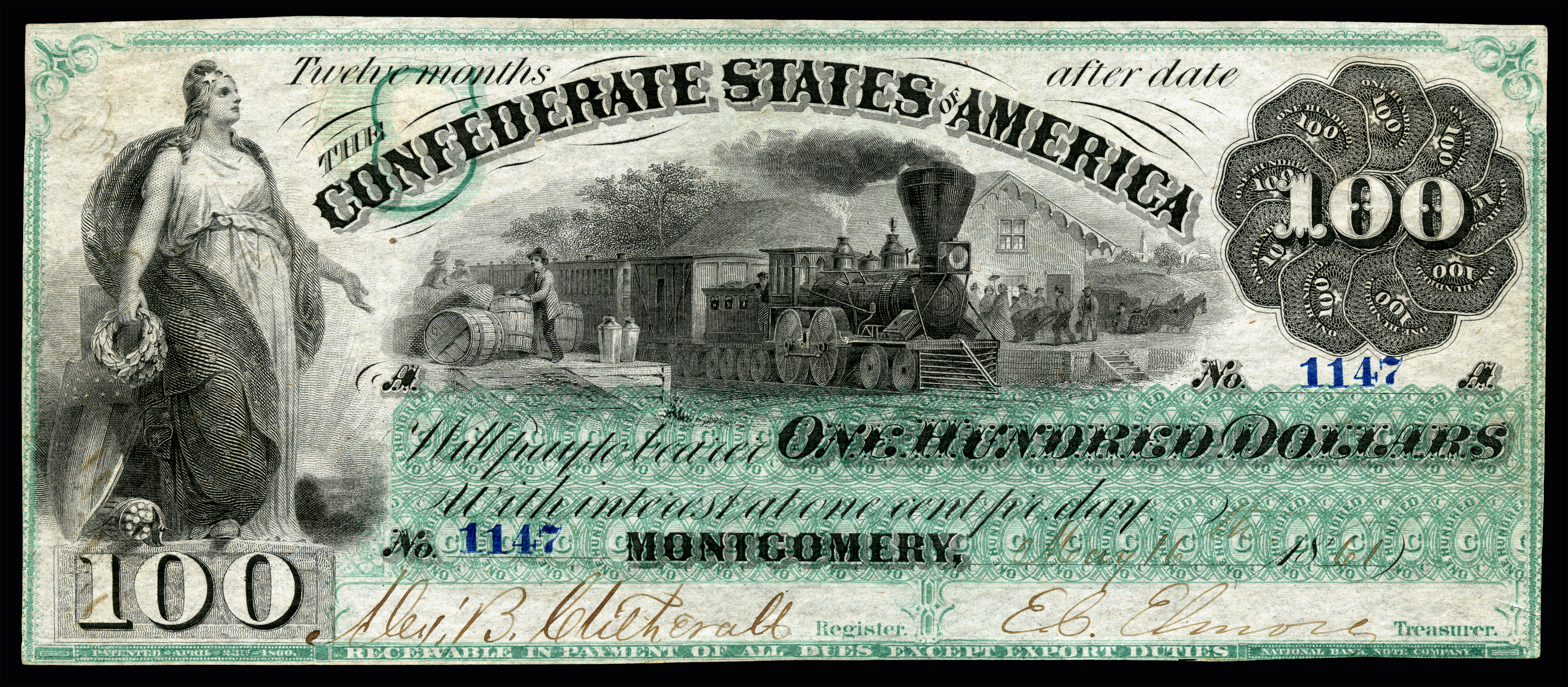
Confederate $100 from 1861, train pulling into a station at center. Columbia at left.

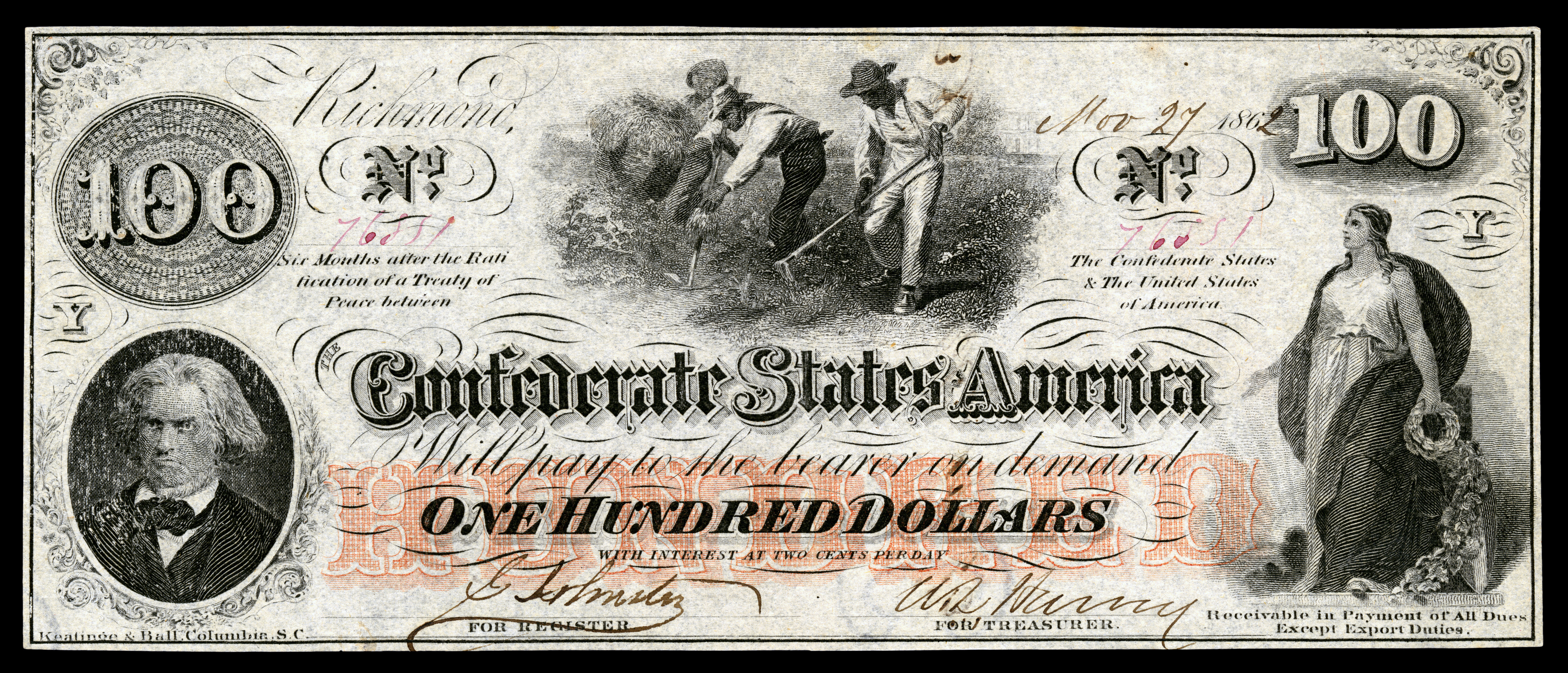
Confederate $100, slaves working a cotton field at center. John C. Calhoun at left, and Columbia at right.

Those on the Union side drew Columbia and the flag on envelopes to show their allegiance to the Union.

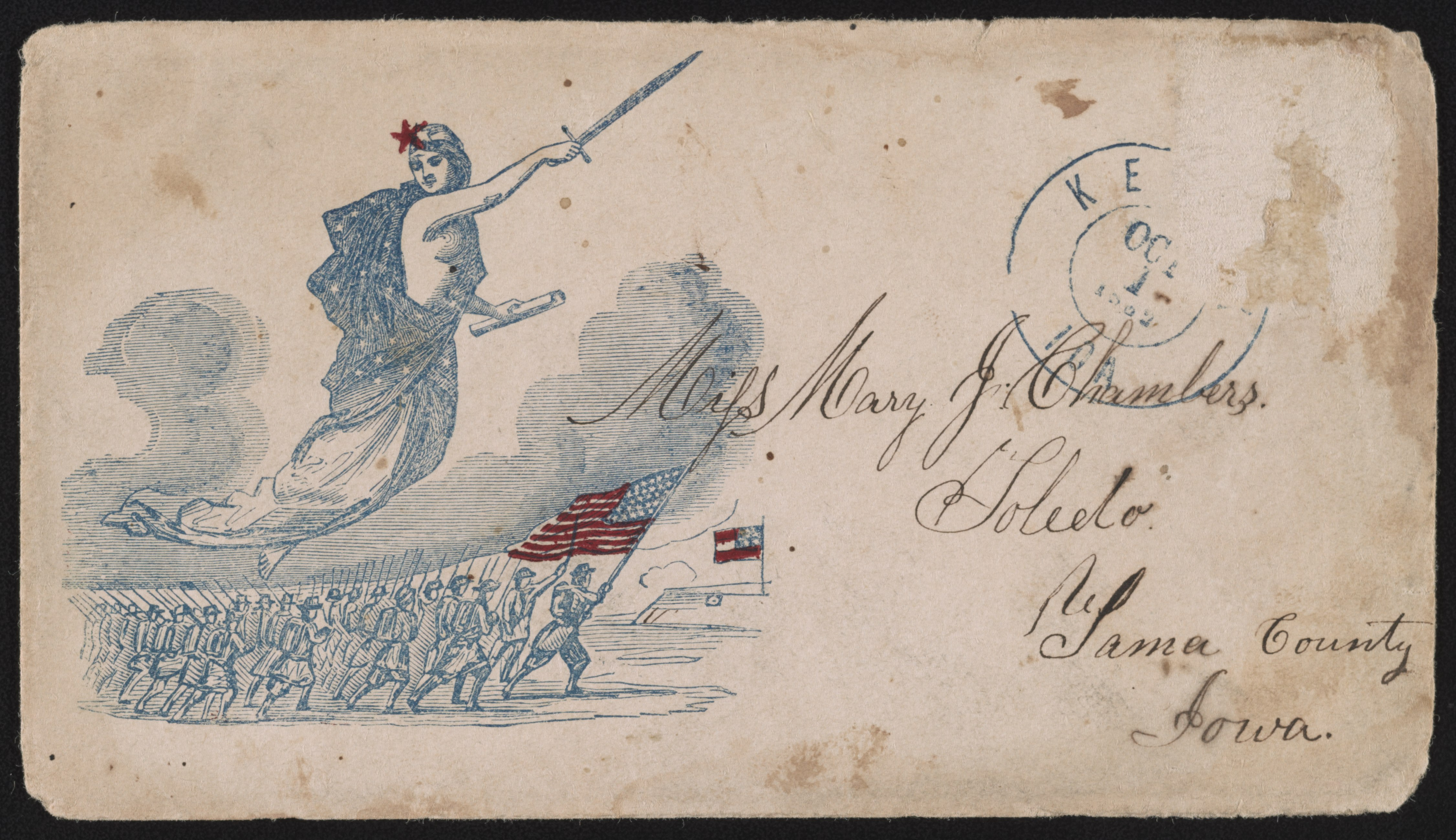
Civil War envelope showing Columbia with sword floating above marching soldiers.

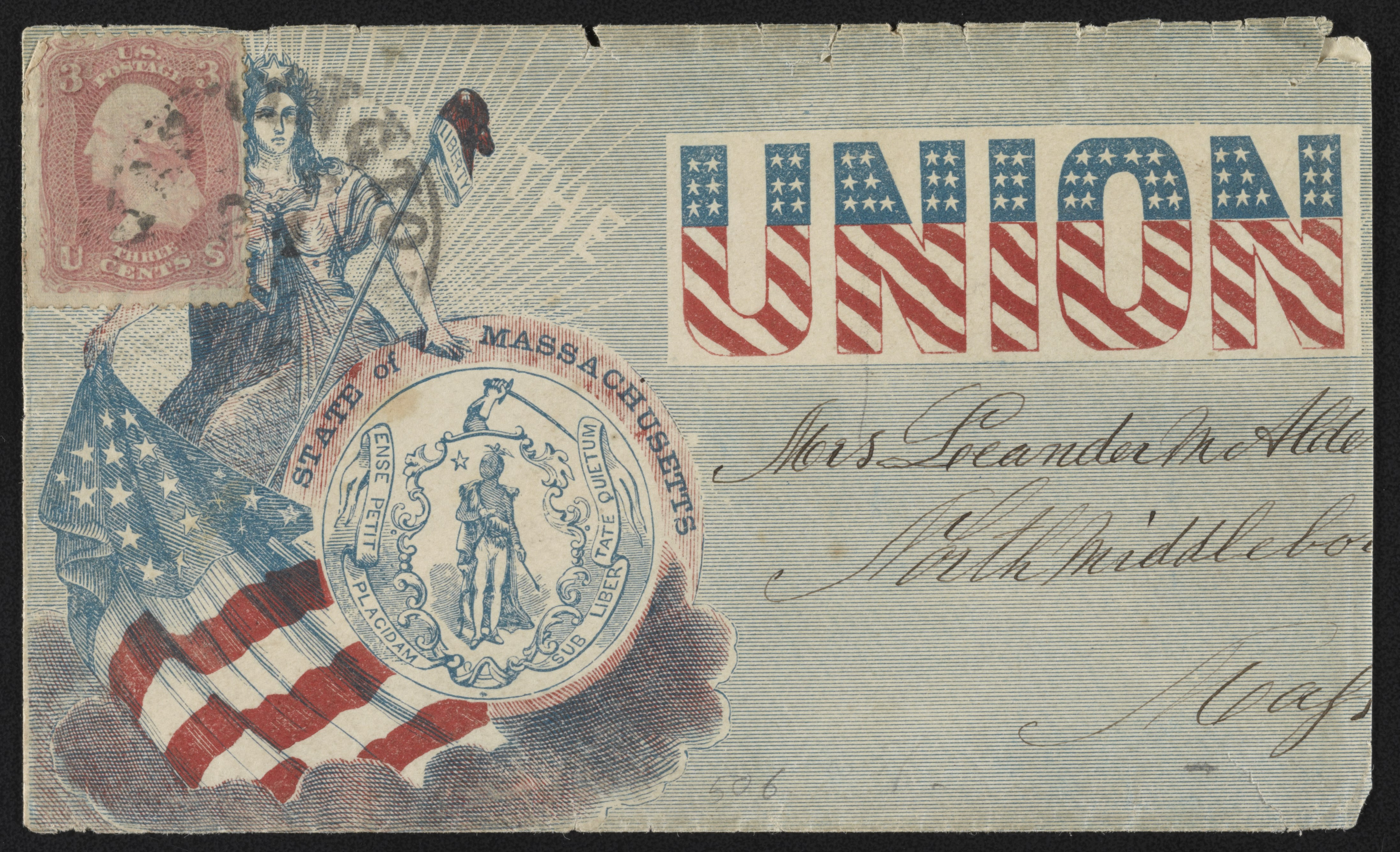
Civil War envelope showing Columbia with flag, Massachusetts state seal, and Phrygian cap bearing message "Loyal to the Union"

"Columbia, the Gem of the Ocean" became popular during the Civil War. The song has lyrics praising the Union in the third verse. (Today, this part is usually not sung.)

The Union, the Union forever,
Our glorious nation's sweet hymn,
May the wreaths it has won never wither,
Nor the stars of its glory grow dim,
May the service united ne'er sever,
But they to their colors prove true.
The Army and Navy forever,
When borne by the red, white, and blue.
𝄆 When borne by the red, white, and blue. 𝄇
The Army and Navy for ever,
Three cheers for the red, white and blue.

Her statue is used on many of the Civil War monuments. Some of them are listed in this page.

=== Early 20th century ===
In the early 20th century, women dressed up as Columbia in parades to appeal for women's suffrage.

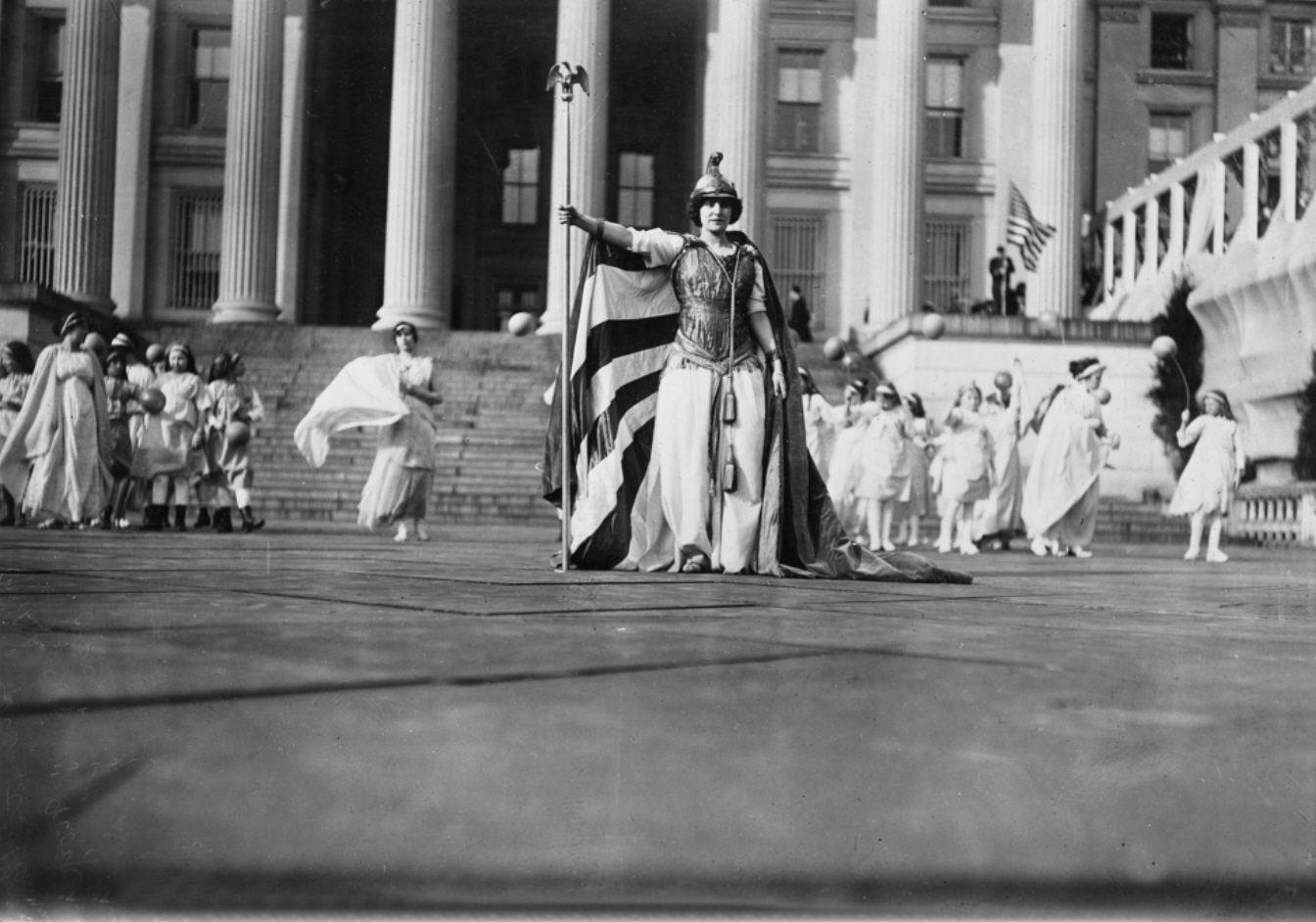
German actress Hedwiga Reicher, dressed as Columbia, stands in front of the Treasury Building with other participants of the suffrage pageant in the background.

Early in World War I (1914–1918), the image of Columbia standing over a kneeling "doughboy" was issued in lieu of the Purple Heart medal. She gave "to her son the accolade of the new chivalry of humanity" for injuries sustained in the World War.

In World War I, the name Liberty Bond for savings bonds was heavily publicized, often with images from the Statue of Liberty (Liberty Enlightening the World). The personification of Columbia fell out of use and was largely replaced by the Statue of Liberty as a feminine symbol of the United States.

After Columbia Pictures adopted Columbia as its logo in 1924, she has since appeared as bearing a torch similar to that of the Statue of Liberty, unlike 19th-century depictions of Columbia. The Columbia Pictures logo is the most famous and prominent display of Columbia to many current Americans.

=== 21st century ===
In 2023, on the commemorative medal issued by the U.S. Mint, Columbia does not wear a Phrygian cap and does not carry a weapon or shield as in the World War I poster. Instead, Columbia is holding an American flag and shaking hands with an American Indian. Between them sits a bust of Washington and the inscription "PEACE." Around them are elements symbolic of American life, both native and industrial. This medal is a reproduction of one issued in the 19th century. On a commemorative coin issued in 2024 depicting Liberty, the designers studied not only the liberty but also the portrayal of Columbia to depict liberty. The race of Liberty depicted on this coin is ambiguous. Like other national symbols such as Marianne, Britannia, and Liberty, Columbia's appearance and depiction has changed over time as a national symbol.

== Columbian ==
The adjective Columbian has been used to mean "of or from the United States of America" such as in the 1893 World's Columbian Exposition held in Chicago, Illinois. It has occasionally been proposed as an alternative word for American.

Columbian should not be confused with the adjective pre-Columbian, which refers to a time period before the arrival of Christopher Columbus in 1492.

== Personification ==
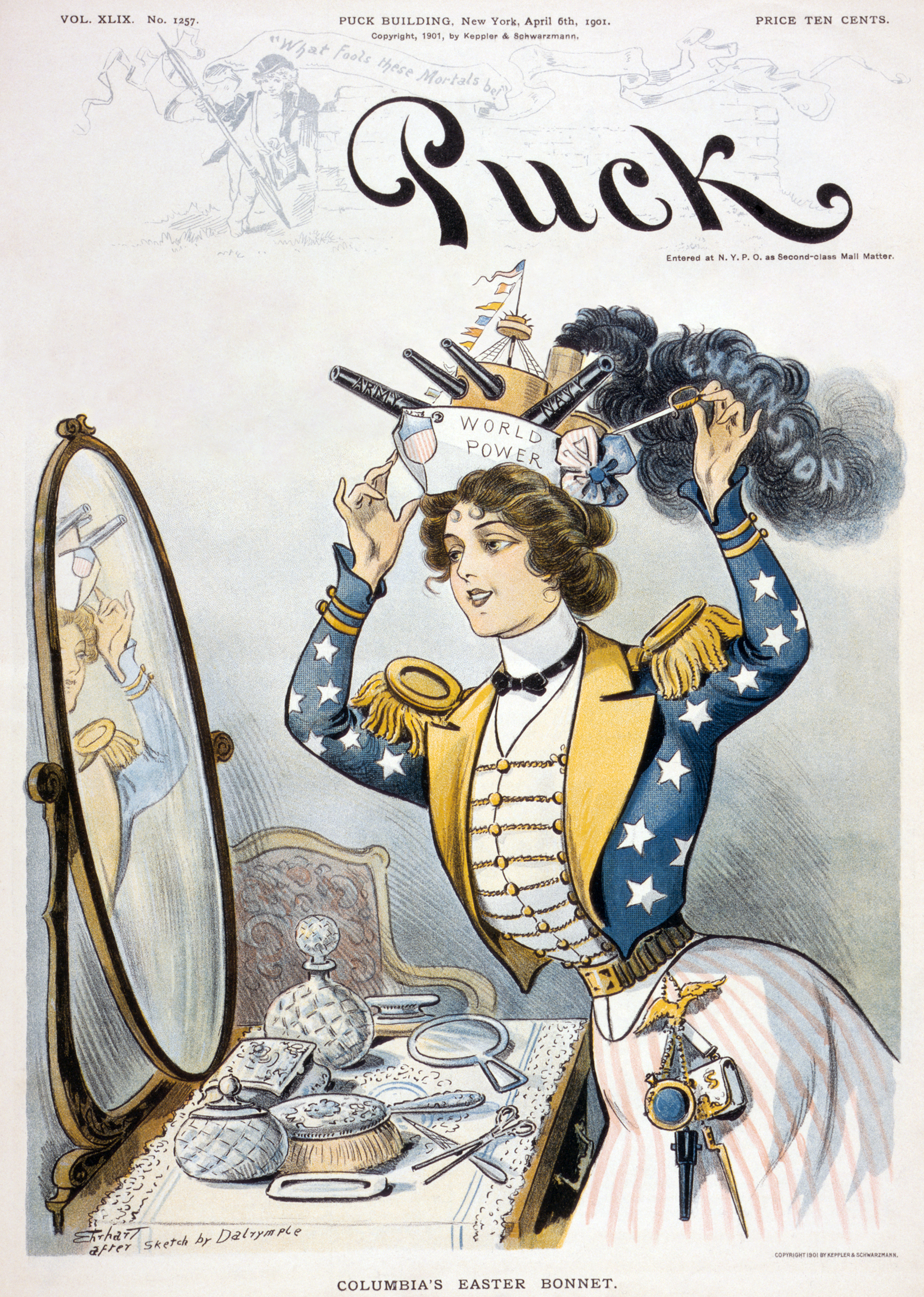
The April 6, 1901 cover of Puck depicts Columbia wearing a warship bearing the words "world power" as her Easter bonnet.

As a quasi-mythical figure, Columbia first appears in the poetry of the African-American Phillis Wheatley in October 1775, during the Revolutionary War:

One century scarce perform'd its destined round,
When Gallic powers Columbia's fury found;
And so may you, whoever dares disgrace
The land of freedom's heaven-defended race!
Fix'd are the eyes of nations on the scales,
For in their hopes Columbia's arm prevails.

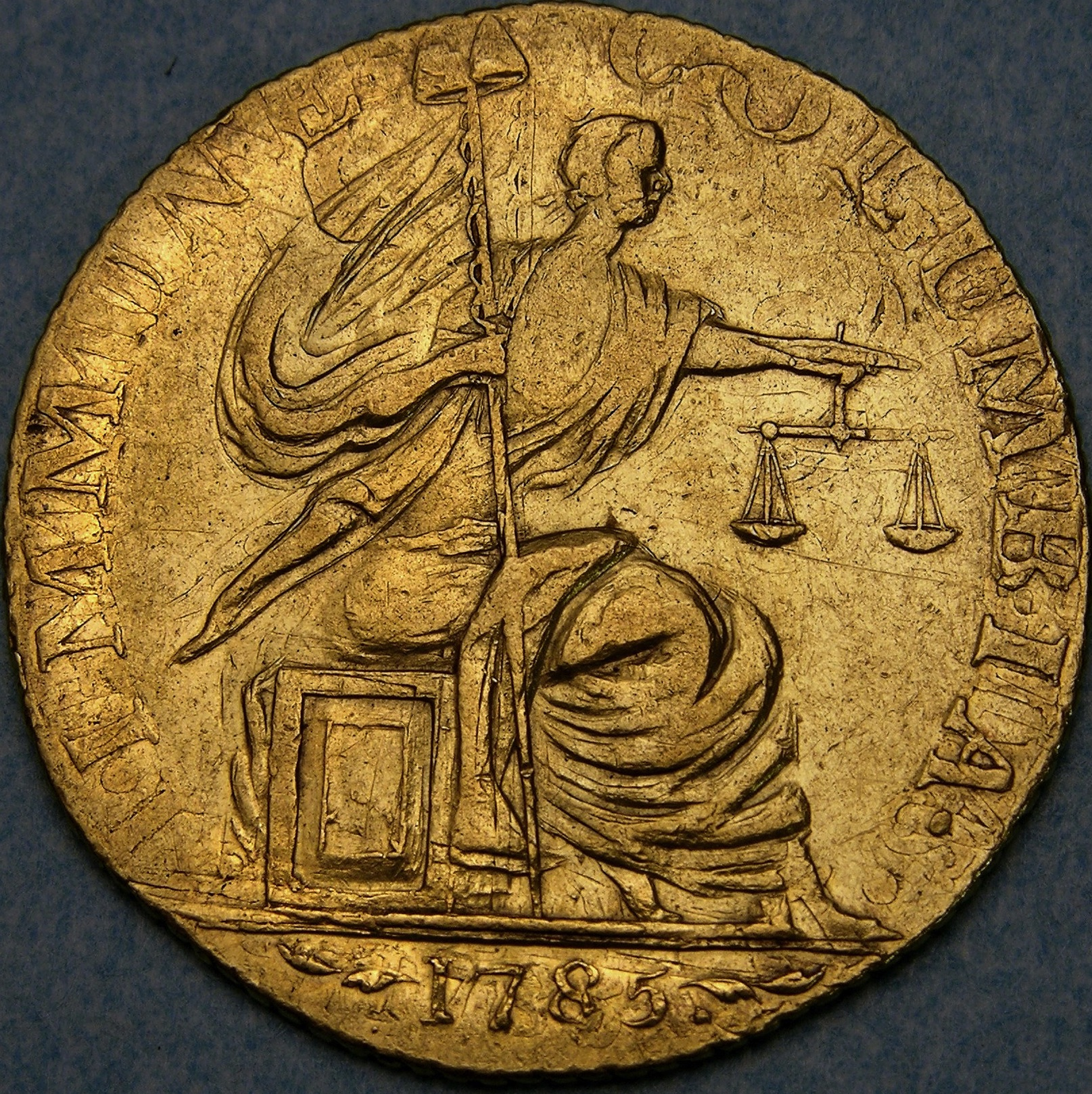
Immune Columbia (interpreted as America free from tribute) was produced at George Wyon's private mint, Birmingham, England in 1785. Seated figure of Columbia with scales of justice and a Liberty cap

=== Appearance ===
Especially in the 19th century, Columbia was visualized as a goddess-like female national personification of the United States and of liberty itself, comparable to the British Britannia, the Italian Italia Turrita and the French Marianne, often seen in political cartoons of the 19th and early 20th century. The personification was sometimes called Lady Columbia or Miss Columbia. Such an iconography usually personified America in the form of an Indian queen or Native American princess. The image of the personified Columbia was never fixed, but she was most often presented as a woman between youth and middle age, wearing classically draped garments decorated with stars and stripes. A popular version gave her a red-and-white-striped dress and a blue blouse, shawl, or sash, spangled with white stars. Her headdress varied and sometimes it included feathers reminiscent of a Native American headdress while other times it was a laurel wreath, but most often, it was a cap of liberty.

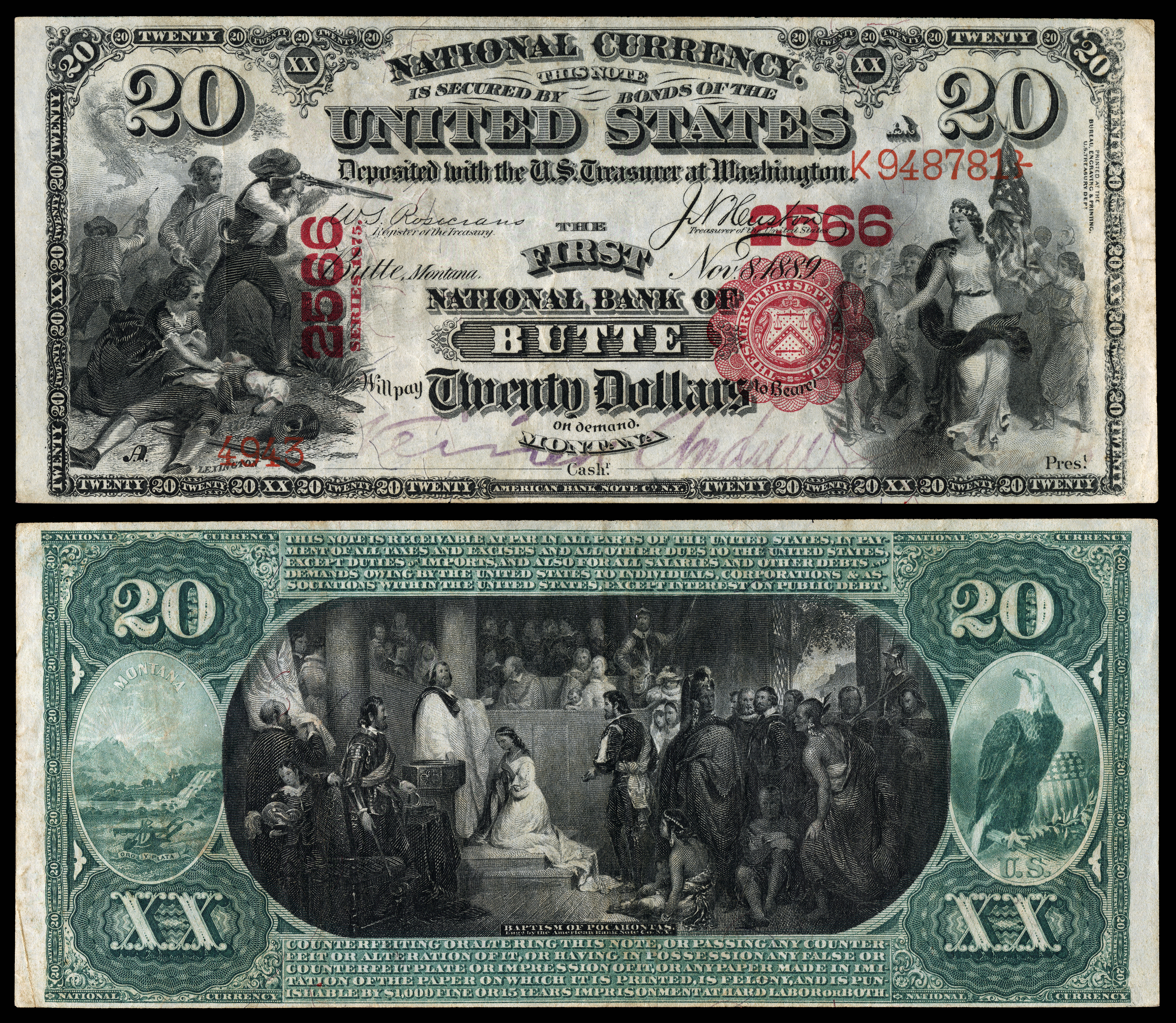
20 Dollar National Bank Notes.The Battle of Lexington at left. Columbia carrying a flag and leading a procession at right. And above her is written " LOYALTY ". These notes were issued between 1863 and 1935.

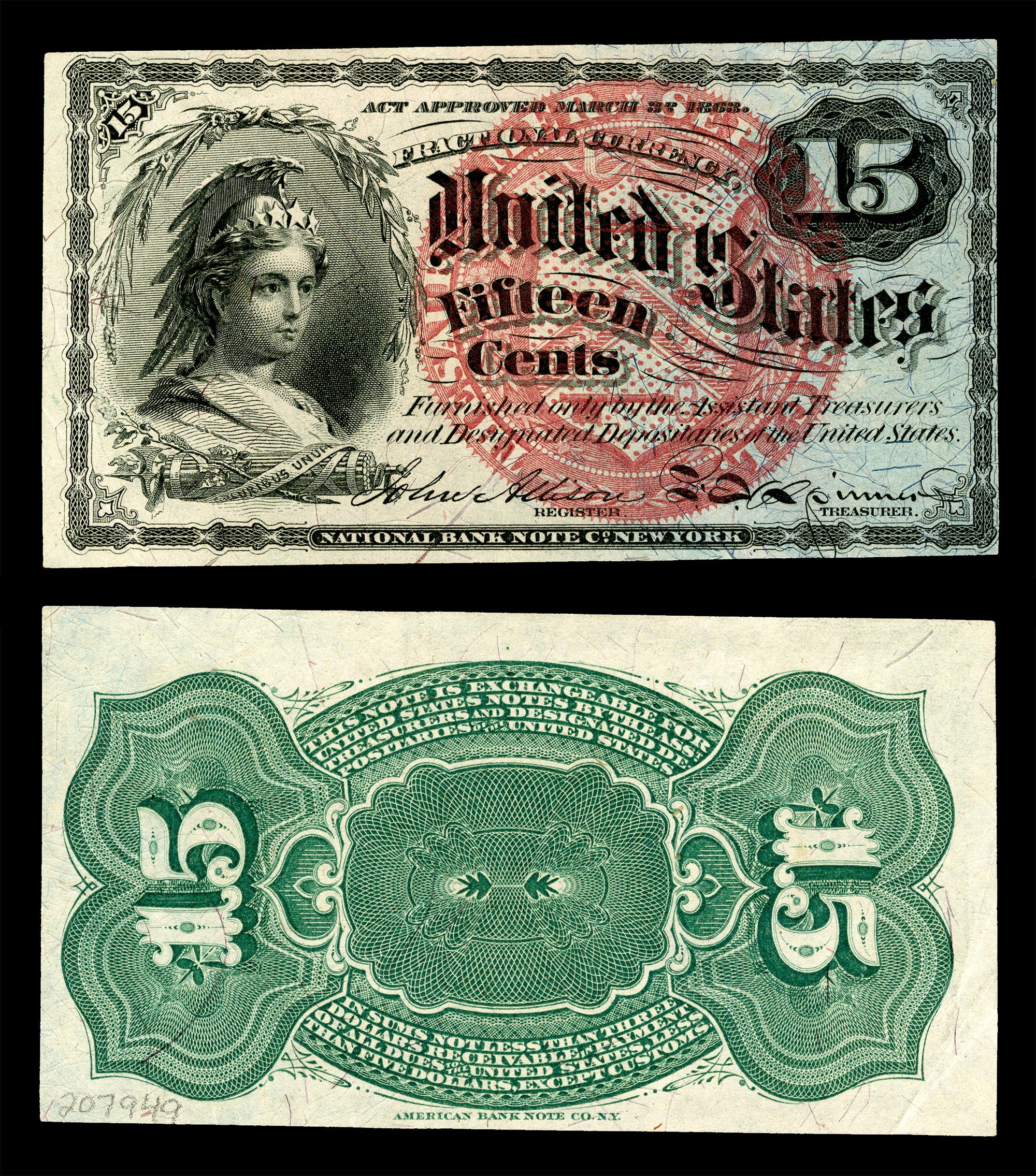
The Bust of Columbia depicted on a 15-cent bank note. These notes were in use between 21 August 1862 and 15 February 1876

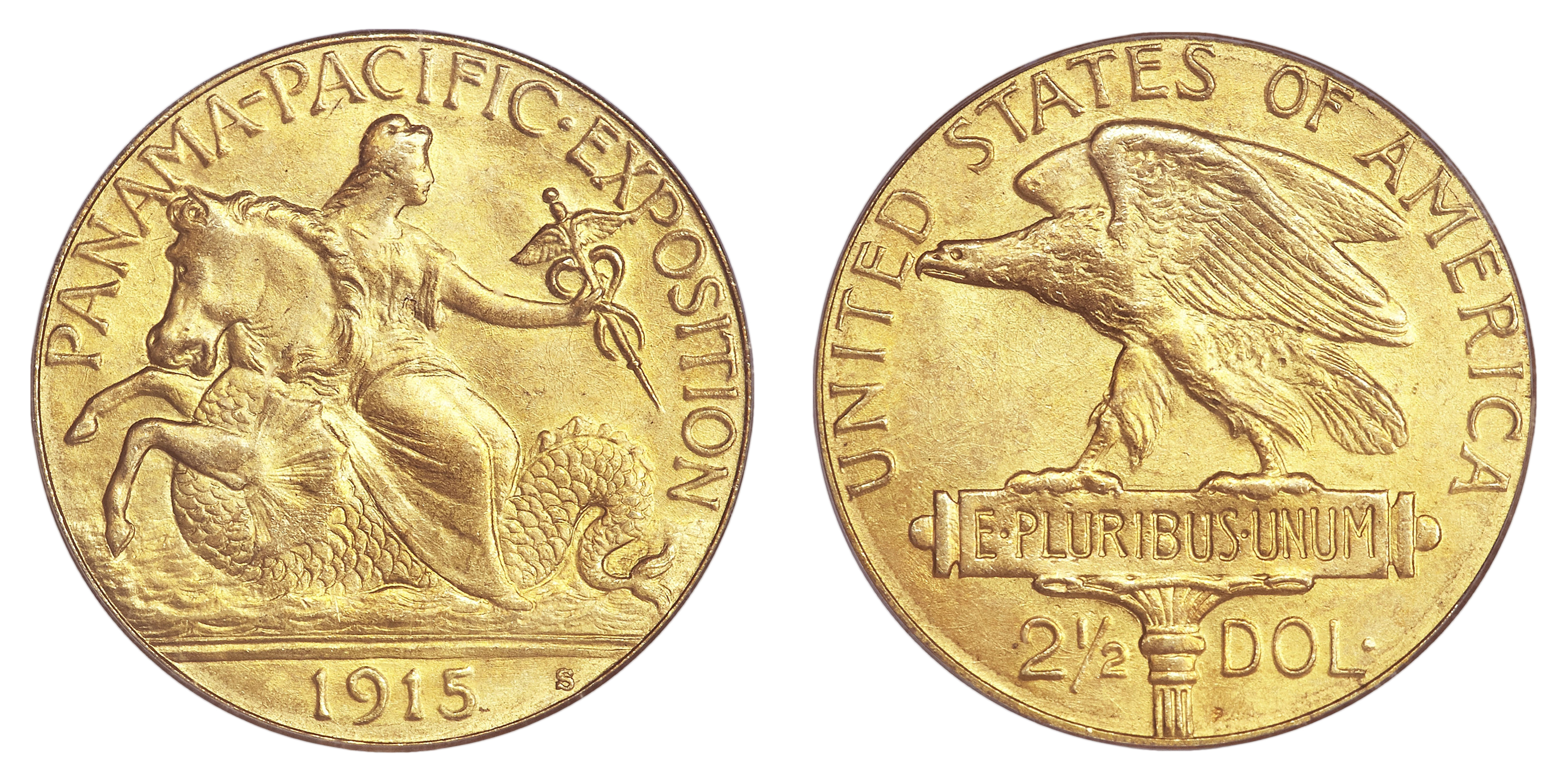
2 1/2 dollar coin, issued in 1915 to commemorate the Panama-Pacific International Exposition. Columbia is seated on a hippocampus, or mythological sea horse, and holding a caduceus

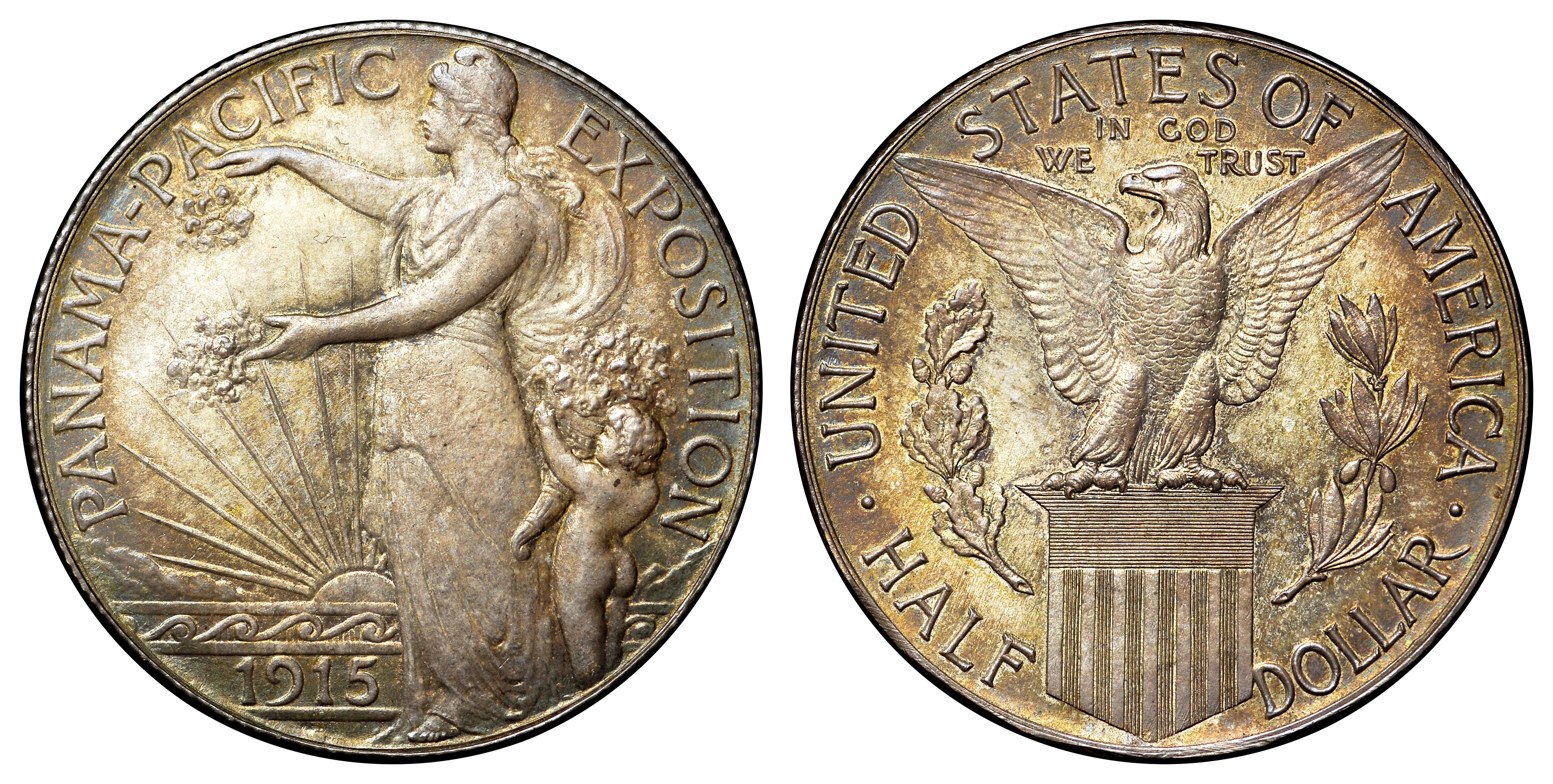
1/2 dollar coin, issued in 1915 to commemorate the Panama-Pacific International Exposition. Columbia is standing, sunset in background. This was the first commemorative coin to carry the motto In God We Trust.

=== Sculptures and Statues of Columbia ===
Statues of the personified Columbia may be found among others in the following places:

- The 1863 Statue of Freedom atop the United States Capitol building, though not actually called Columbia, shares many of her iconic characteristics.
- The replica Statue of the Republic (Golden Lady) in Chicago's Jackson Park is often understood to be Columbia. It is one of the remaining icons of the 1893 World's Columbian Exposition.
- The Progress of Civilization Pediment on the United States Capitol building.
- The Genius of America Pediment on the United States Capitol building.
- Above the main entrance on the north side of the Arts and Industries Building.(Smithsonian Museum) in Washington D.C.
- The pediment on the Andrew W. Mellon Auditorium, Washington D.C.
- Atop the USS Maine National Monument in Central Park, in Manhattan, New York City
- Atop Philadelphia's Memorial Hall, built 1876
- Atop the Salt Lake City and County Building
- The pediment on the Colorado State Capitol Building
- Above the Statue of Francis Scott Key in San Francisco, California. The Statue of Francis Scott Key was removed, but the Statue of Columbia remains in place.
- Above the Francis Scott Key Monument in Baltimore, Maryland
- In the Mount Olivet Cemetery in Frederick, Maryland.
- In the Bountiful Veteran's Park in Bountiful, Utah.

=== Civil War Monuments ===
- Atop the Soldiers' and Sailors' Arch in Brooklyn, New York.
- Atop the Soldiers and Sailors Monument in Troy, New York
- The Illinois monument in the Andersonville National Cemetery.
- The Civil War Monument at Central Park in Jacksonville, Illinois.
- Atop the Steuben County Soldiers' Monument in Angola, Indiana.
- Salisbury Soldiers' Monument. in Civil War Memorial Park, Salisbury, Connecticut.
- In the Columbia Triumphant Park in Monmouth County, New Jersey.

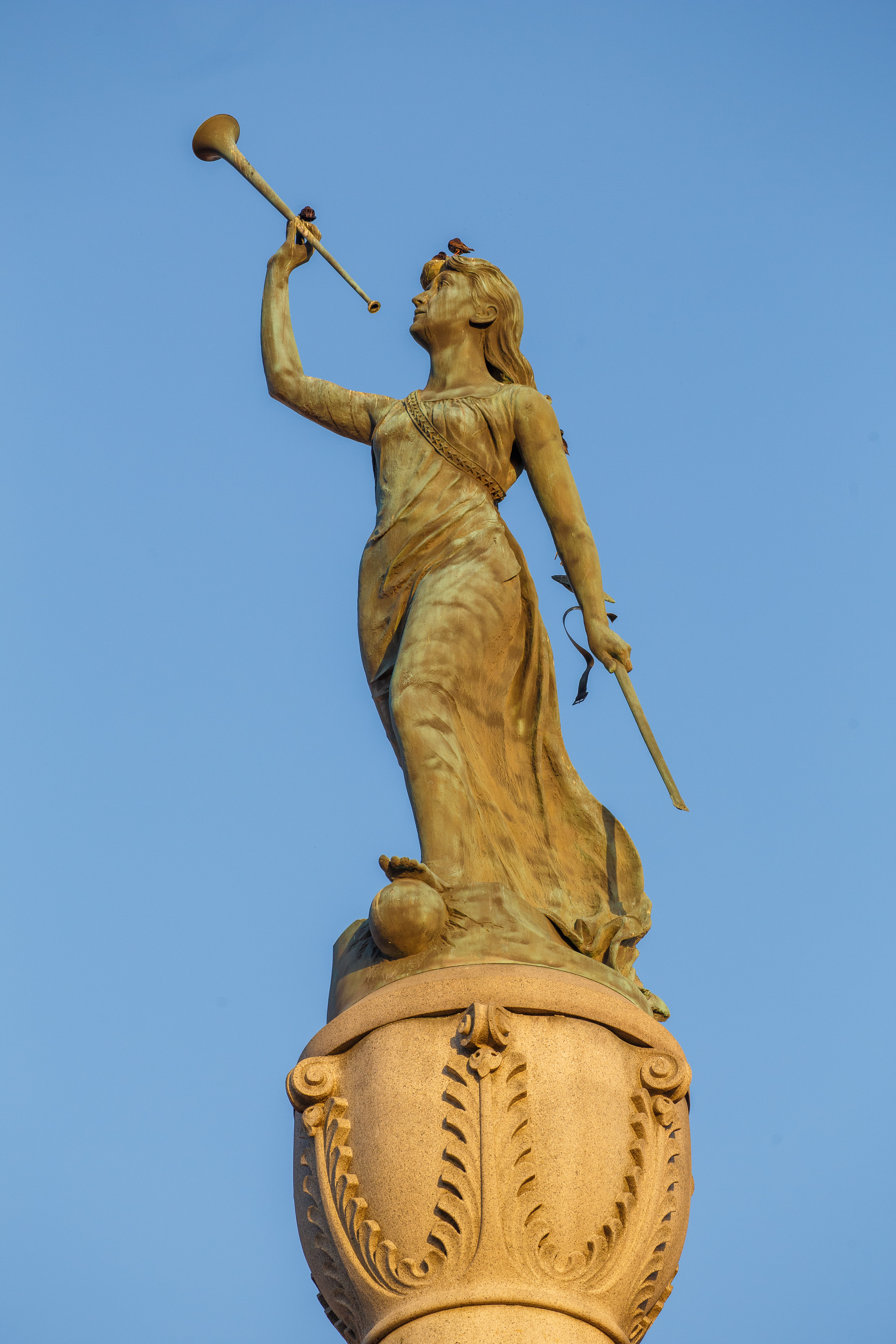
The Call to Arms in Troy, New York

=== WWI Monuments ===
- The Victory Monument (Chicago). It was built to honor the African-American unit that served with distinction in France during WWI.
- The Littlefield Fountain in Austin, Texas.
- Outside the Barack Obama Academy of International Studies in Pittsburgh, Pennsylvania. It was restored in 2024.
- The hospers Memorial Statues in Hospers, Iowa. This statue is colored and the model for Columbia is a local young woman.
- The Oak Park River Forest War Memorial in Oak Park, Illinois.
- The World War I memorial in Edgemont Park, Montclair, New Jersey.
- The Victory Monument in The Victory Park Historic District of Manchester, New Hampshire.

=== WWII Monuments ===
- In the National Memorial Cemetery of the Pacific in Hawaii
- The West Coast Memorial to the Missing of World War II in San Francisco, California.
- In the Normandy American Cemetery and Memorial standing next to a similar statue of Marianne

=== Outside the United States ===
- On the wall of the New York Palace building in Budapest, Hungary.
- On the wall of the Atlantic Chambers building in Liverpool, England.
- In the Normandy American Cemetery and Memorial in Colleville-sur-Mer, Normandy, France
- On the Château-Thierry American Monument in Aisne, France

== Modern appearances ==
Since 1800, the name Columbia has been used for a wide variety of items and places:

- The naming of the New World and of the newly independent country of Colombia after Christopher Columbus in the early 19th century is discussed at Colombia § Etymology.
- In the 1840s, British Columbia, which is now a province of Canada, was named by Queen Victoria. The details of the naming of the Columbia River and the Columbia provinces around it are discussed at British Columbia § Origin of the Name.
- The element niobium was first called columbium, a name which some people still use today. The name columbium, coined by the chemist Charles Hatchett upon his discovery of the metal in 1801, reflected that the type specimen of the ore came from America.
- Avenues and streets in various cities and towns throughout the United States named Columbia Avenue or Columbia Street, such as the Columbia Avenue Historic District in Davenport, Iowa, and various Columbia Avenues in Pennsylvania cities.
- Columbia County, Wisconsin
- Columbia County, Pennsylvania
- Columbia, Kentucky in Adair County
- Columbia, Pennsylvania in Lancaster County
- Columbia, Maryland in Howard County
- Columbia, Connecticut in Tolland County
- The South Carolina state capital of Columbia, located in Richland County
- Columbia, Missouri in Boone County
- Columbia, Tennessee in Maury County
- Columbia Square, Savannah
- The name Columbia has been used as the name of many ships. For example USS Columbia (SSN-771) is named for three cities: Columbia, Illinois, Columbia, Missouri and Columbia, South Carolina.

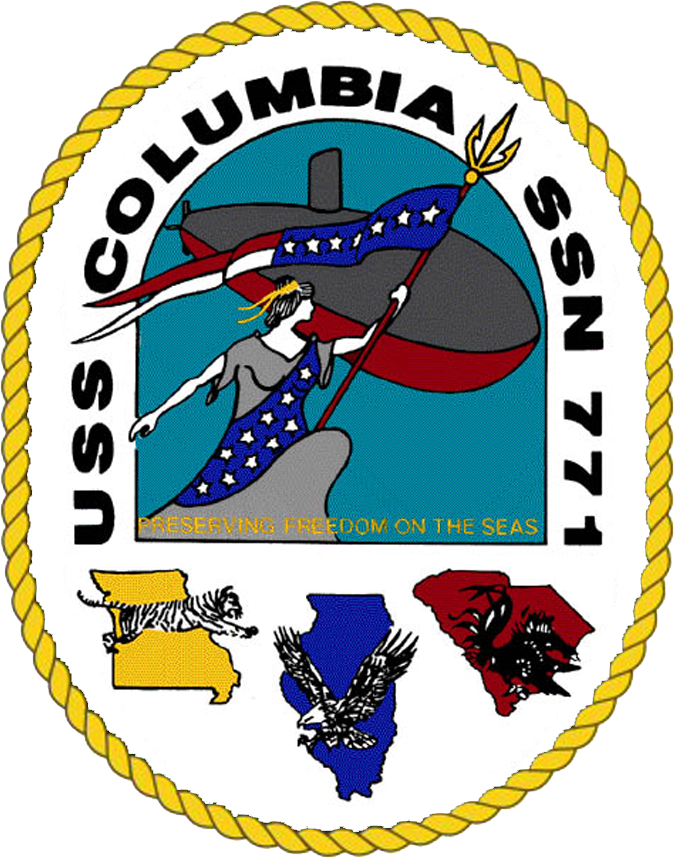
Badge of the USS Columbia (SSN-771), A woman holding a trident and cities named Columbia are depicted.

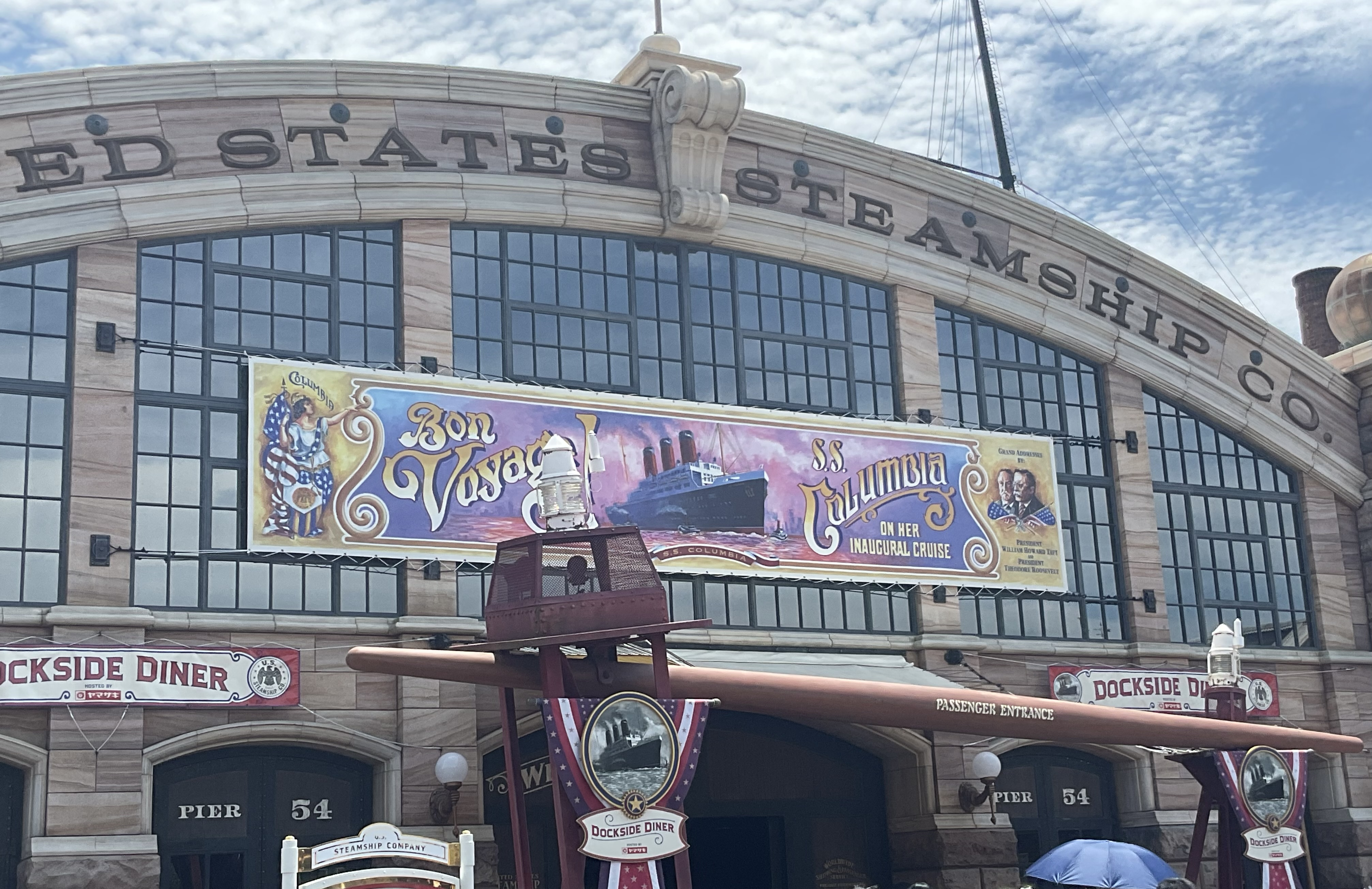
Banner commemorating the SS Columbia at American Waterfront, Tokyo DisneySea, Japan. Columbia is depicted at left.

- Columbia University, an Ivy League university in New York City that first adopted the name Columbia College in 1784 to replace King's College
- The song "Hail, Columbia," an American patriotic song. It was considered with several other songs one of the unofficial national anthems of the United States until 1931, when "The Star-Spangled Banner" was officially named the national anthem.
- The song "Columbia, Gem of the Ocean" (1843) commemorates the United States under the name Columbia.
- Columbia Records, founded in 1888, took its name from its headquarters in the District of Columbia.
- Columbia Pictures, named in 1924, uses a version of the personified Columbia as its logo after a great deal of experimentation.
- CBS's former legal name was the Columbia Broadcasting System, first used in 1928. The name derived from an investor, the Columbia Phonograph Manufacturing Company, which owned Columbia Records.
- The Command Module of the Apollo 11 spacecraft, the first crewed mission to land on the Moon, was named Columbia (1969).
- The Space Shuttle Columbia, built in 1975 to 1979, was named for the exploring ship Columbia.
- A personified Columbia appears in Uncle Sam, a graphic novel about American history (1997).
- The setting of the steampunk video game BioShock Infinite is the alternate reality city of Columbia, which makes frequent use of Columbia's image. Columbia herself is believed to be an archangel by the citizens.
- In the mobile game Arknights, Columbia is used as the name of an in-game country that is based on the United States.
- Columbia, played by Laura Bell Bundy, appears in season two of the Starz series American Gods, based on the 2001 novel of the same name by Neil Gaiman.
- The Columbia Typographical Union/CWA No. 101 is the oldest existing local union in the United States.

== Gallery ==
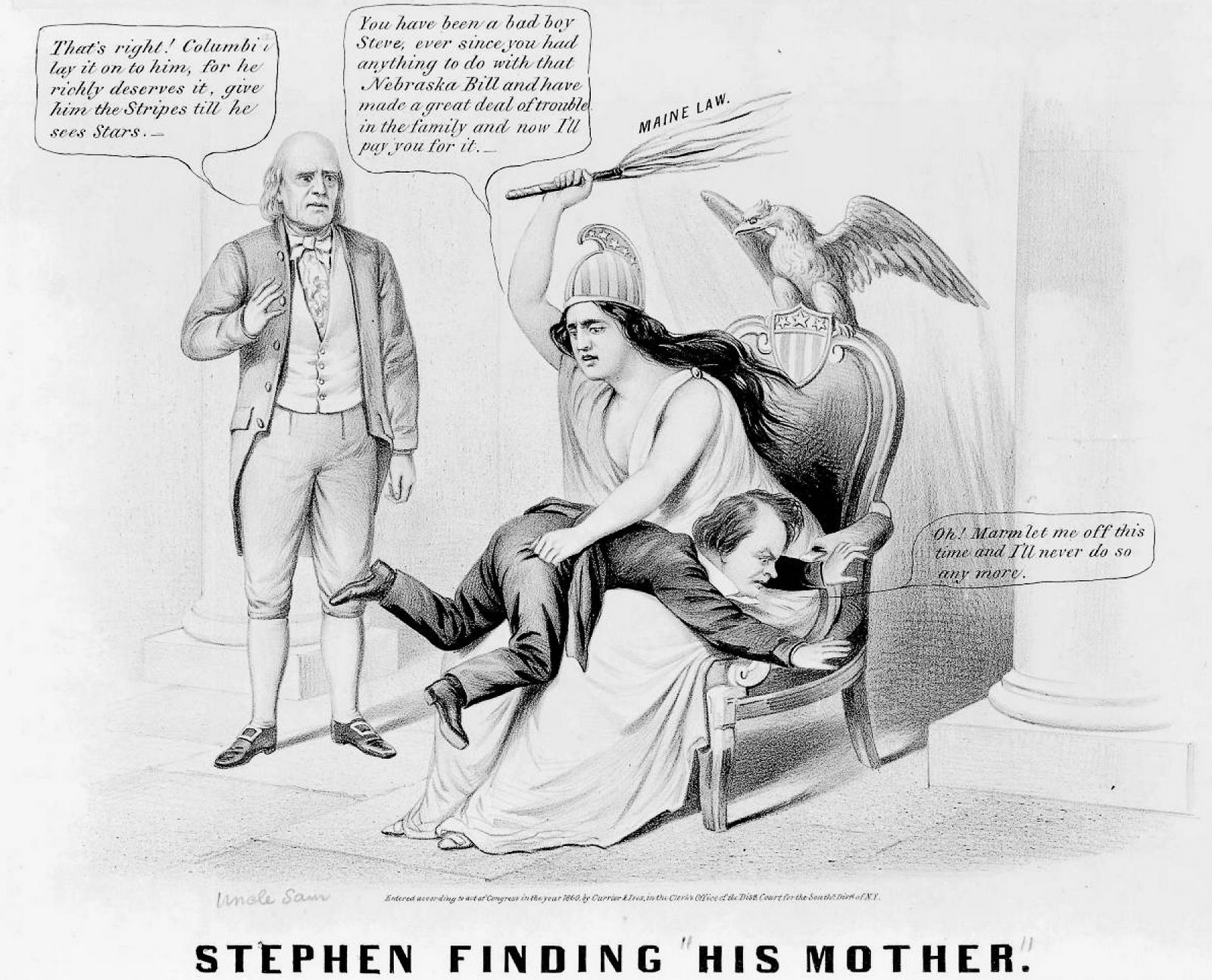
Political cartoon from 1860 depicting Stephen A. Douglas receiving a spanking from Columbia as Uncle Sam looks on approvingly

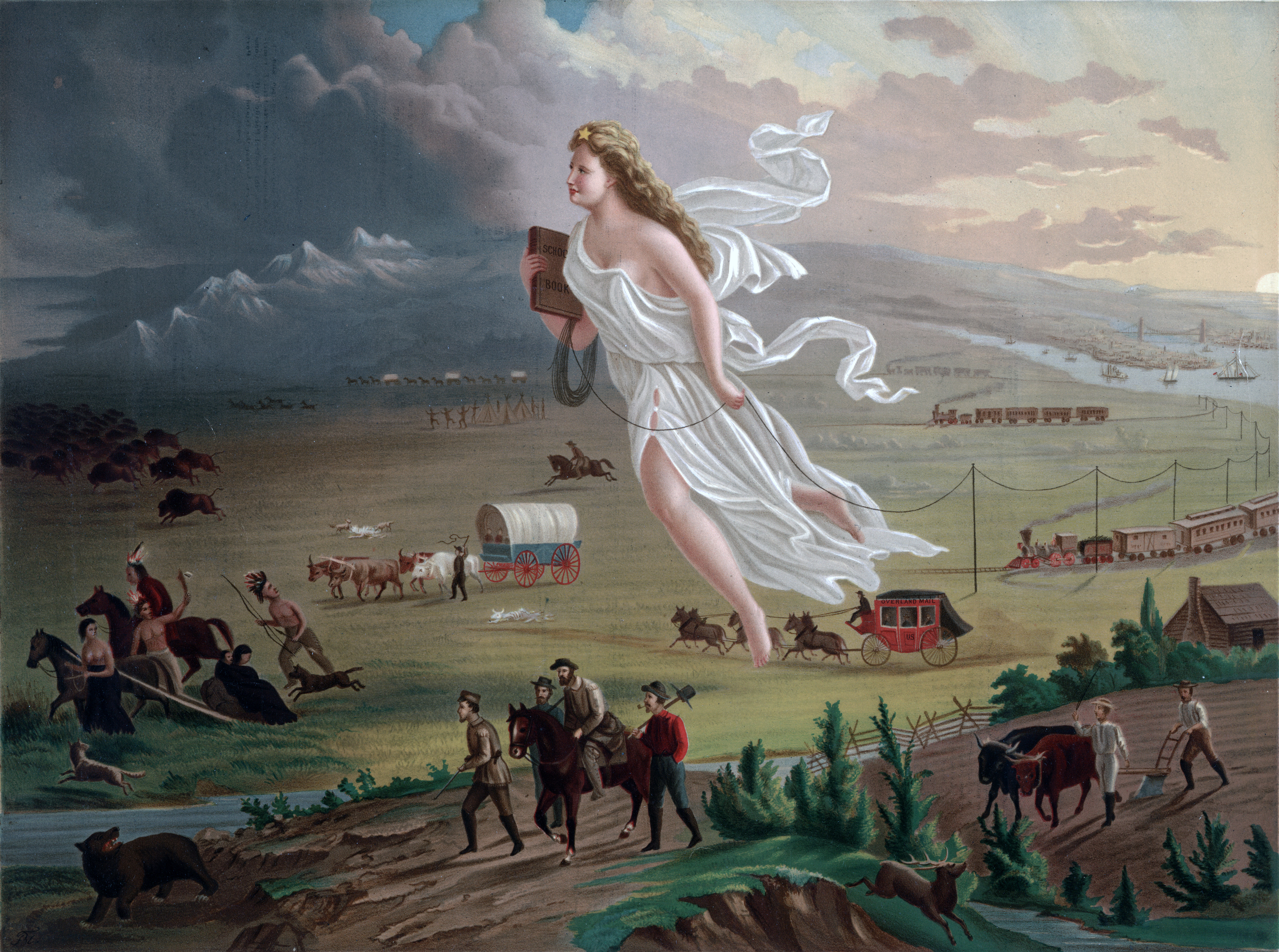
In John Gast's 1872 painting American Progress, Columbia symbolizes the Spirit of the Frontier, advancing telegraph lines to fulfill manifest destiny.

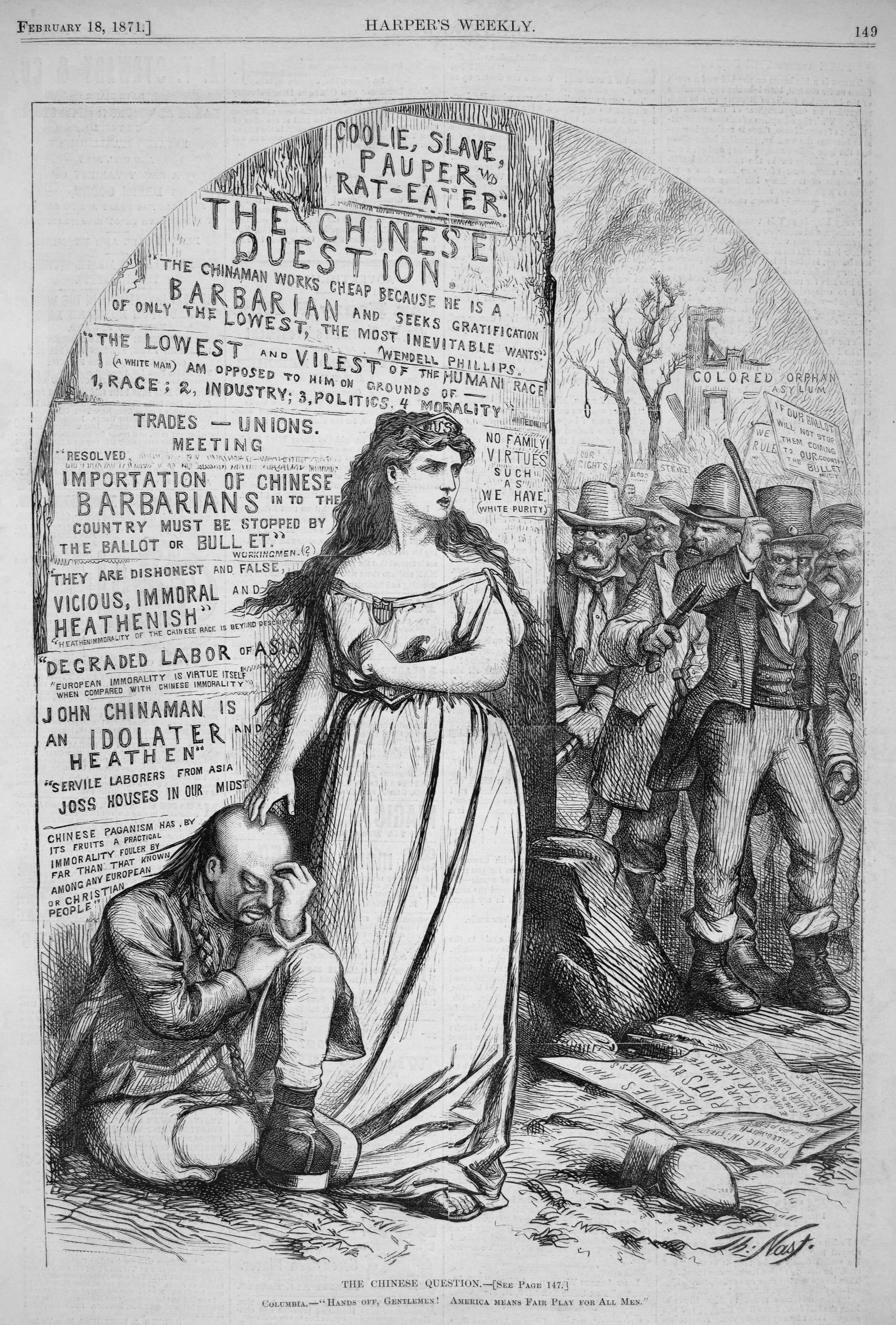
A defiant Columbia in an 1871 Thomas Nast cartoon shown protecting a defenseless Chinese man from an angry Irish lynch mob that has just burned down an orphanage

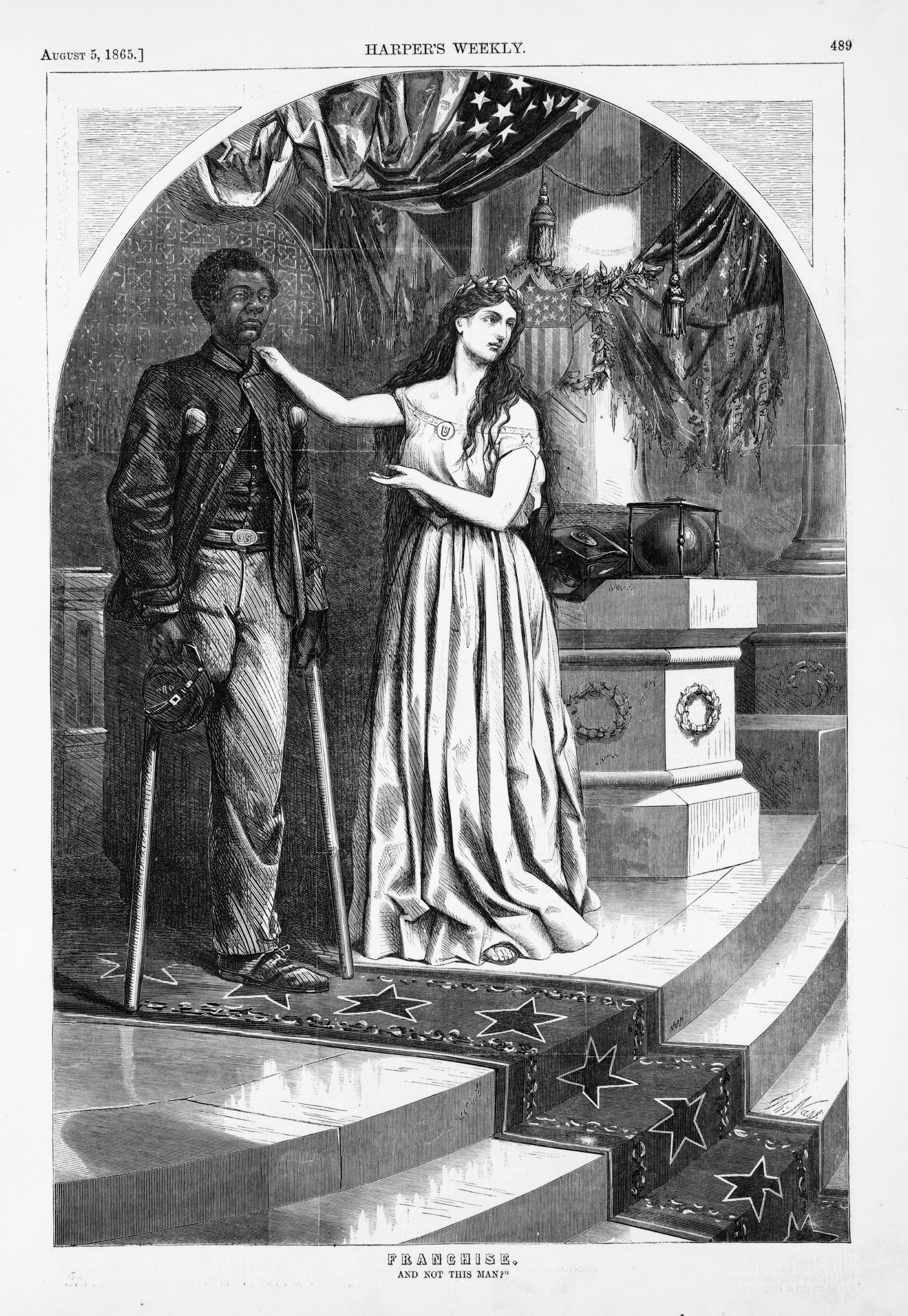
Columbia in an 1865 Thomas Nast cartoon asking the government to allow black soldiers to vote

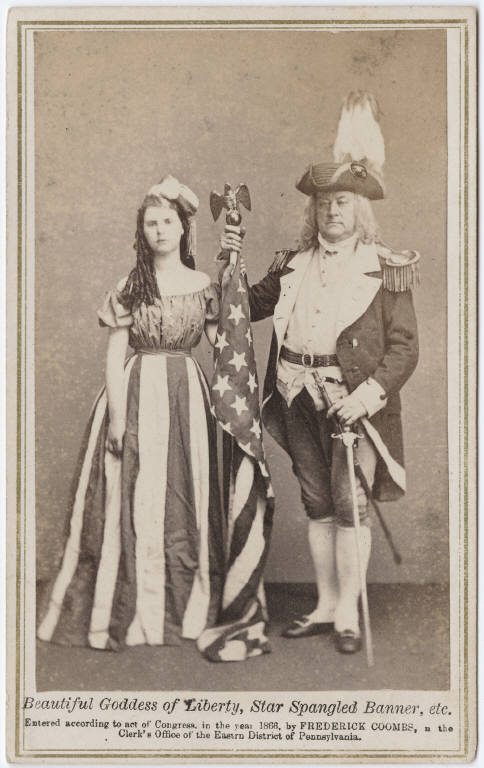
Carte de visite (c. 1866) featuring a woman dressed as Columbia and a man dressed as a Revolutionary War general

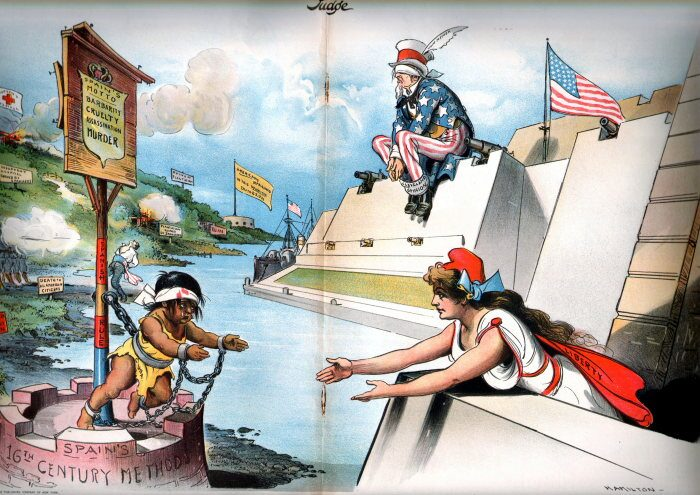
Columbia (representing the American people) reaches out to oppressed Cuba with blindfolded Uncle Sam in background (Judge, February 6, 1897; cartoon by Grant E. Hamilton).

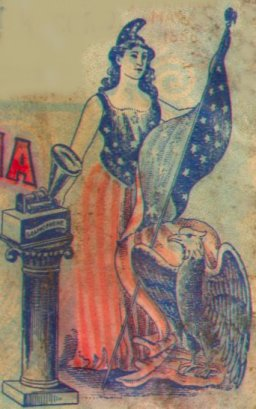
Columbia from a Columbia Records phonograph cylinder package

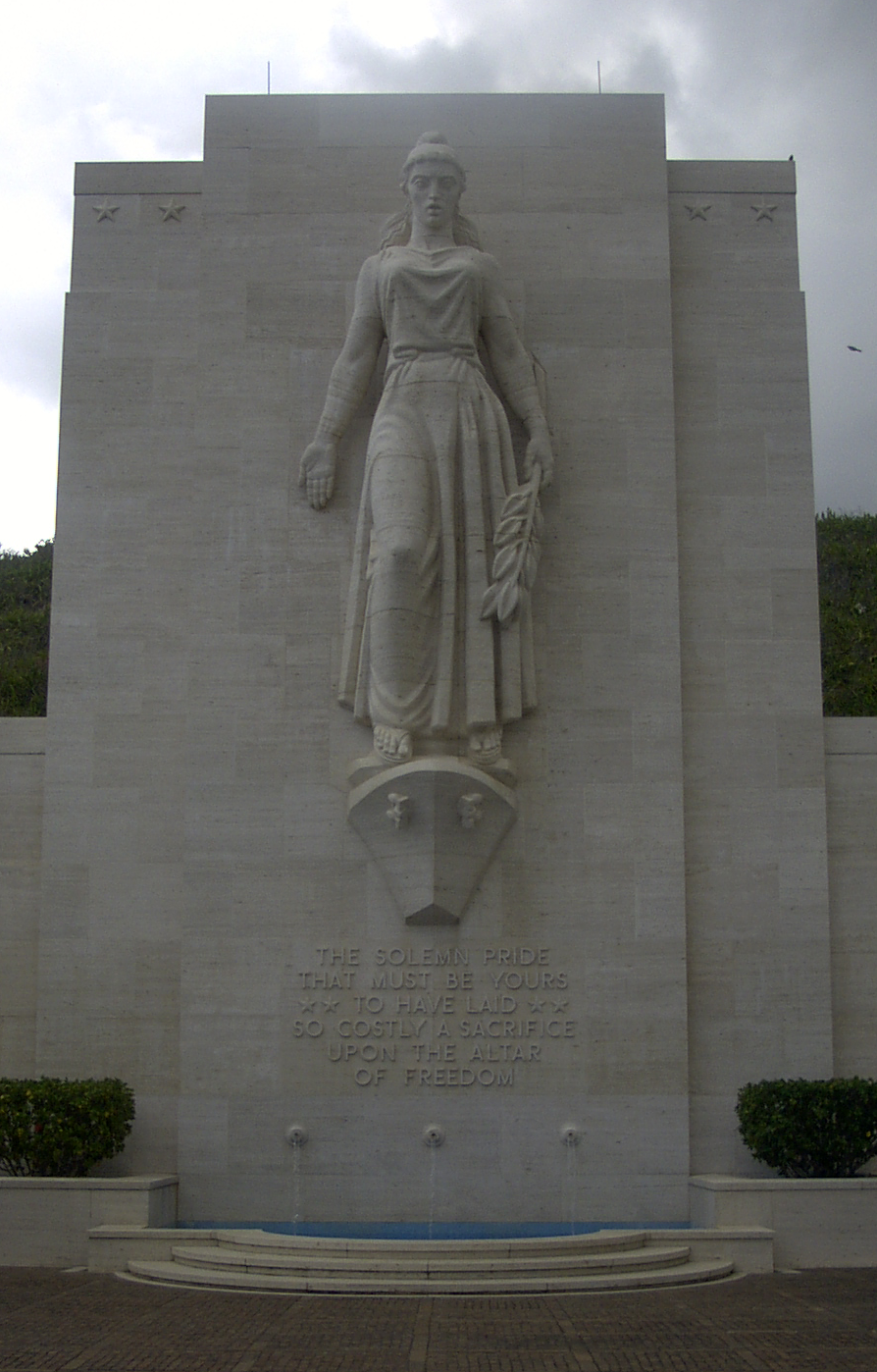
Columbia at the National Memorial Cemetery of the Pacific

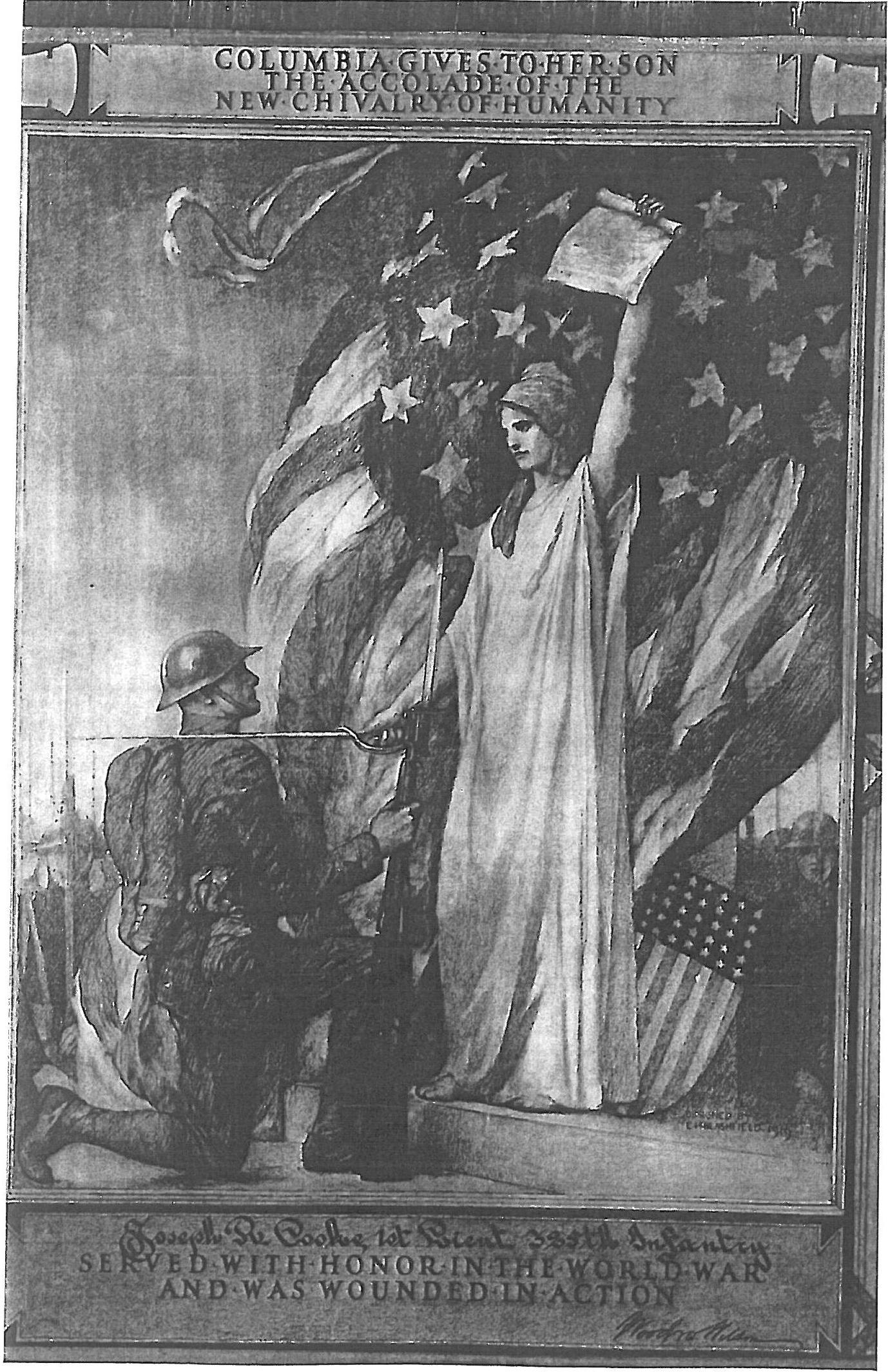
Lady Columbia recognized World War I Doughboy soldier as having suffered injury due to his willingness to serve humanity.

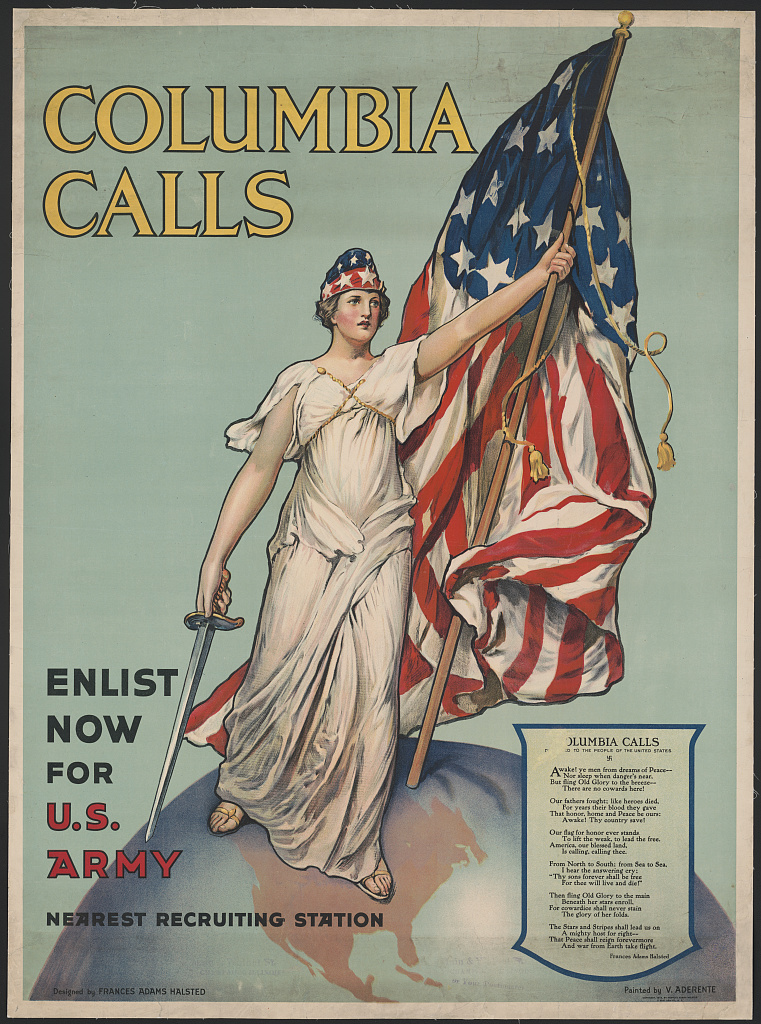
Columbia Calls – Enlist Now for U.S. Army, World War I recruitment poster by Vincent Aderente

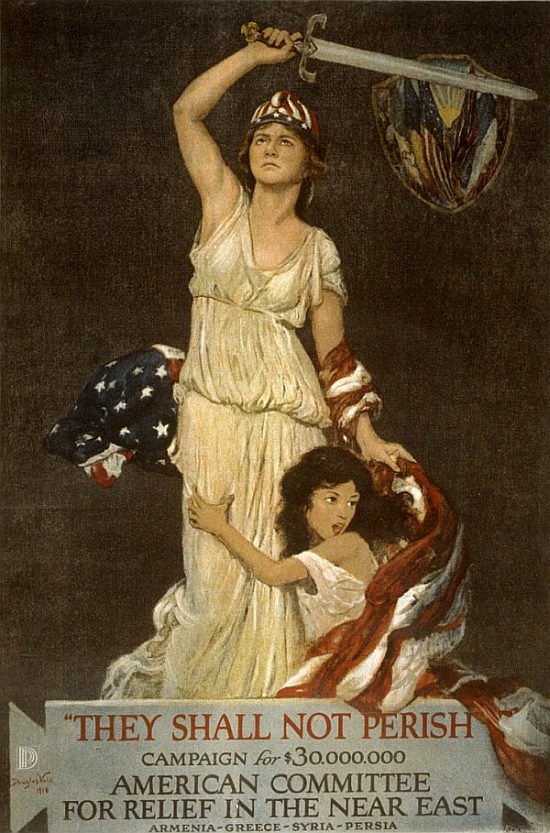
Columbia depicted in an American Committee for Relief in the Near East poster

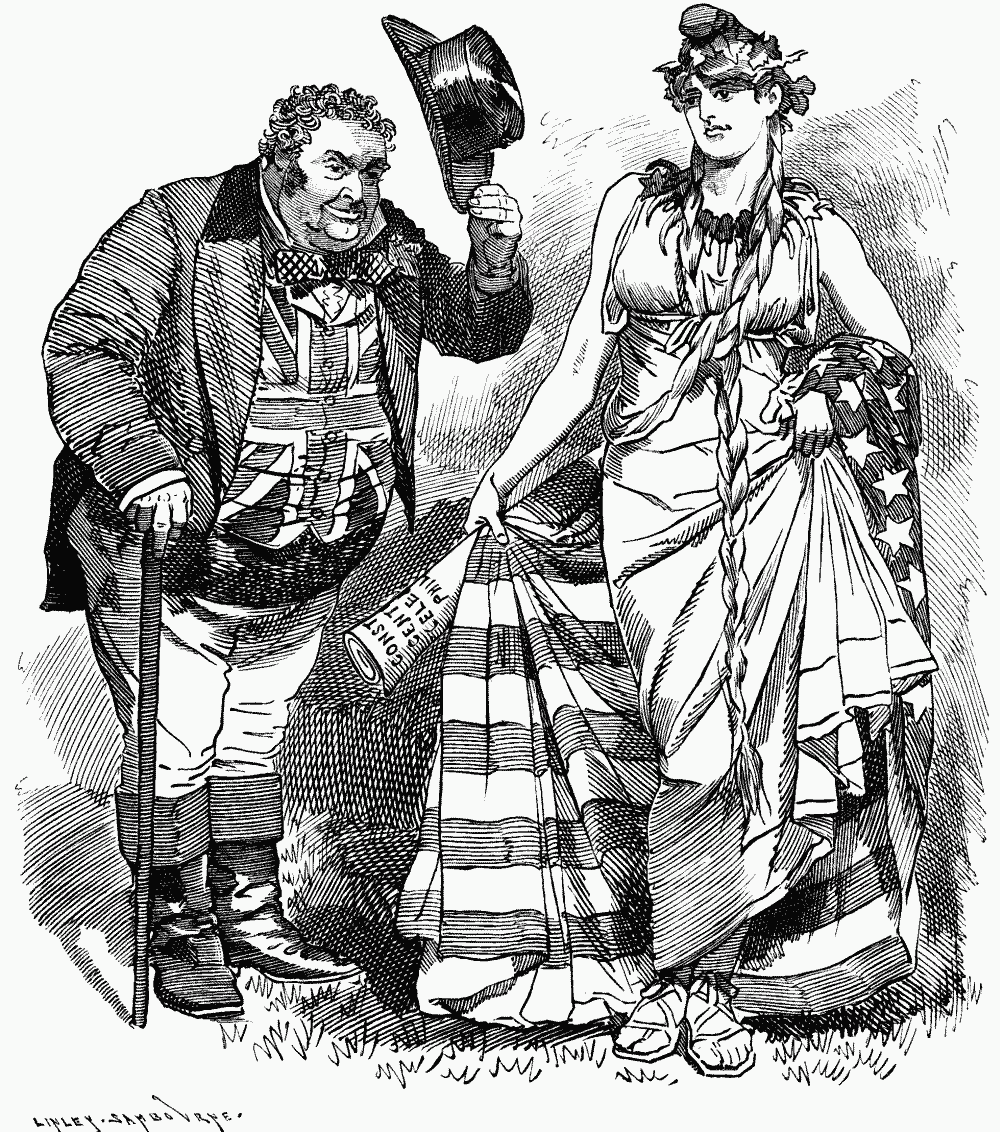
John Bull and Columbia in an 1887 Punch illustration.

== See also ==
- Statue of Liberty (Liberty Enlightening the World), the more common female personification of the United States beginning in the 20th century
- Uncle Sam – National personification of the United States
- List of national personifications
- Britannia, a similar symbol for Britain
- Marianne, a similar symbol for France
- Mother Russia, a medieval feminine personification of Russia
- Germania, a female personification of Germany
- Italia turrita, a similar symbol for Italy
- Our Lady of Guadalupe, a similar symbol for Mexico, albeit of religious nature
- Goddess of Democracy, a destroyed statue in Tiananmen Square
- Lady Justice, the personification of law and justice
- Liberty, a goddess personification of Liberty

== Sources ==
- Higham, John (1990). "Indian Princess and Roman Goddess: The First Female Symbols of America", Proceedings of the American Antiquarian Society. 100: 50–51, JSTOR or PDF
- Le Corbeiller, Clare (1961), "Miss America and Her Sisters: Personifications of the Four Parts of the World", The Metropolitan Museum of Art Bulletin, vol. 19, pp. 210–223, PDF
- George R. Stewart (1967). Names on the Land. Houghton Mifflin Company: Boston.
