= Columbia High School =

Columbia High School may refer to:

- Columbia High School (Huntsville, Alabama)
- Columbia High School (Georgia)
- Columbia High School (Florida)
- Columbia High School (Idaho)
- Columbia High School (Illinois)
- Columbia High School (Mississippi), a Mississippi Landmark
- Columbia High School (Columbia, Missouri)
- Columbia High School (New Jersey), Maplewood, New Jersey
- Columbia High School (New York), East Greenbush, New York
- Columbia High School (Ohio)
- Columbia High School (South Carolina)
- Columbia High School (Texas)
- Columbia High School (Burbank, Washington)
- Columbia High School (White Salmon, Washington)
- Reynolds High School (Oregon), formerly known as Columbia High School

== See also ==
- Columbia Borough School District, Columbia, Pennsylvania
- Columbia City High School, Columbia City, Indiana
- Columbia River High School, Vancouver, Washington
- Southern Columbia Area School District, Catawissa, Pennsylvania
