= Columbia City =

Columbia City is the name of several places in the United States:

- Columbia City, Indiana
- Columbia City, Oregon
- Columbia City, Seattle, a neighborhood of Seattle

== See also ==
- Columbia (disambiguation)
- Columbia, Missouri
- Columbia, South Carolina
