= District (disambiguation) =

District is a type of administrative division in some countries managed by a local government.

District may also refer to:

- District, an alternative term for neighbourhood
- Central business district (sometimes called the "financial district"), in large cities
- Electoral district, a territorial subdivision for holding elections
- Congressional district, an electoral district in the United States
- District (LDS Church), geographical division for The Church of Jesus Christ of Latter-day Saints
- District (EP), an EP by Sponge Cola
- RTL District, a Belgian-Walloon television channel
- School District
- Shopping district, an area with many stores, in small cities or other municipalities

== See also ==
- The District (disambiguation)
- Lake District
- District line, part of the London Underground
- Subdistrict
