= Columbia County =

Columbia County is the name of eight counties in the United States:

- Columbia County, Arkansas
- Columbia County, Florida
- Columbia County, Georgia
- Columbia County, New York
  - Columbia County Airport
- Columbia County, Oregon
- Columbia County, Pennsylvania
- Columbia County, Washington
- Columbia County, Wisconsin

== See also ==
- Columbia (disambiguation)
- County (disambiguation)
- Washington, D.C., U.S.
- Columbiana County, Ohio, U.S.
- Columbus County, North Carolina, U.S.
- Counties of British Columbia, Canada
- Columbia Country, British Columbia, Canada
