= Columbia Mall =

Columbia Mall may refer to a number of shopping centers in the United States:

- Avondale Mall, formerly Columbia Mall, the first enclosed shopping mall in Georgia
- Columbia Mall (Grand Forks), a shopping center in Grand Forks, North Dakota
- Columbia Mall (Missouri), a shopping mall in Columbia, Missouri
- Columbia Mall (Tennessee), a shopping mall in Columbia, Tennessee
- Columbia Colonnade, formerly Columbia Mall, a mall in Bloomsburg, Pennsylvania
- Columbia Place, formerly Columbia Mall, a mall in Columbia, South Carolina
- The Mall in Columbia, formerly Columbia Mall, a shopping center in Columbia, Maryland
