= Columbia Machine =

Columbia Machine Inc.
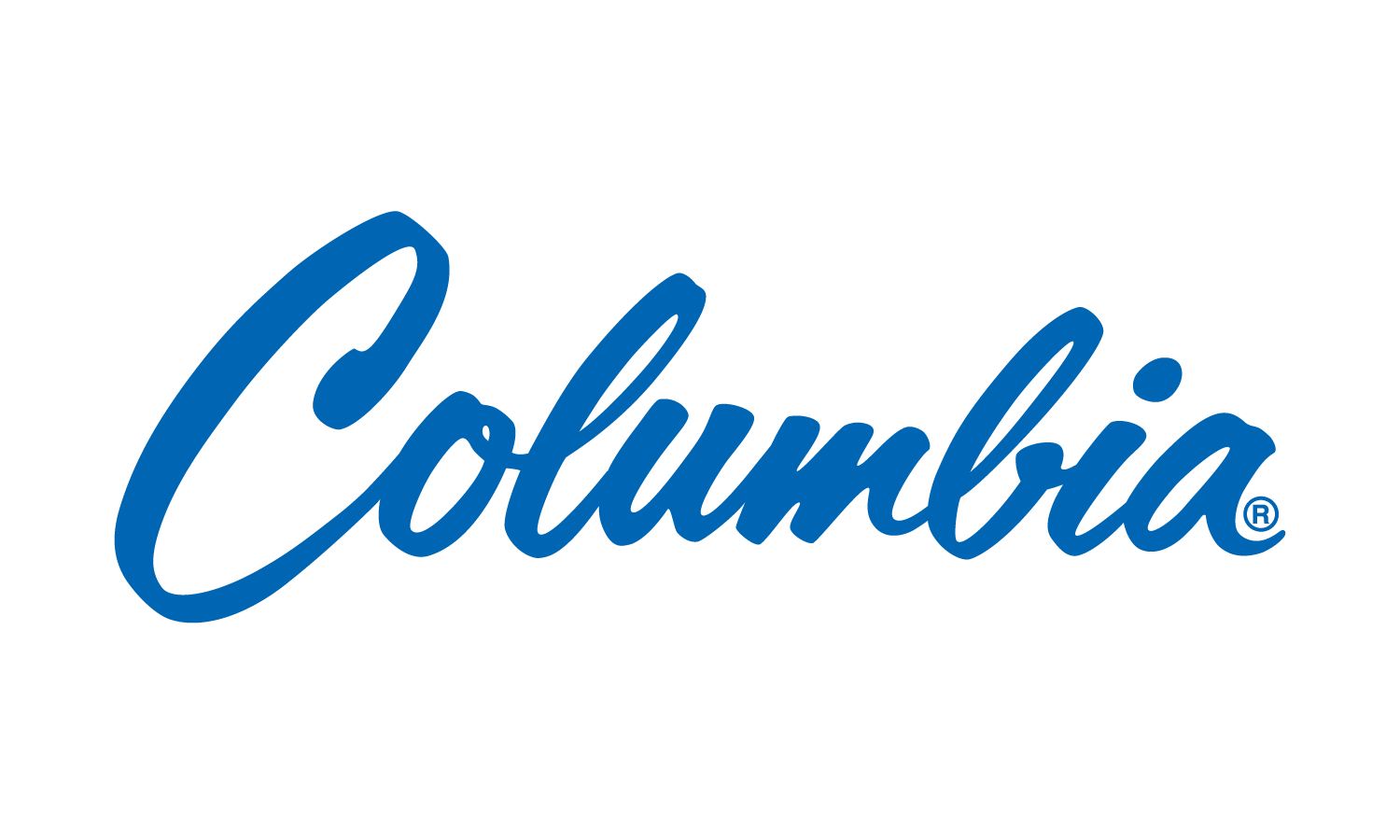
- Columbia Machine Inc. logo

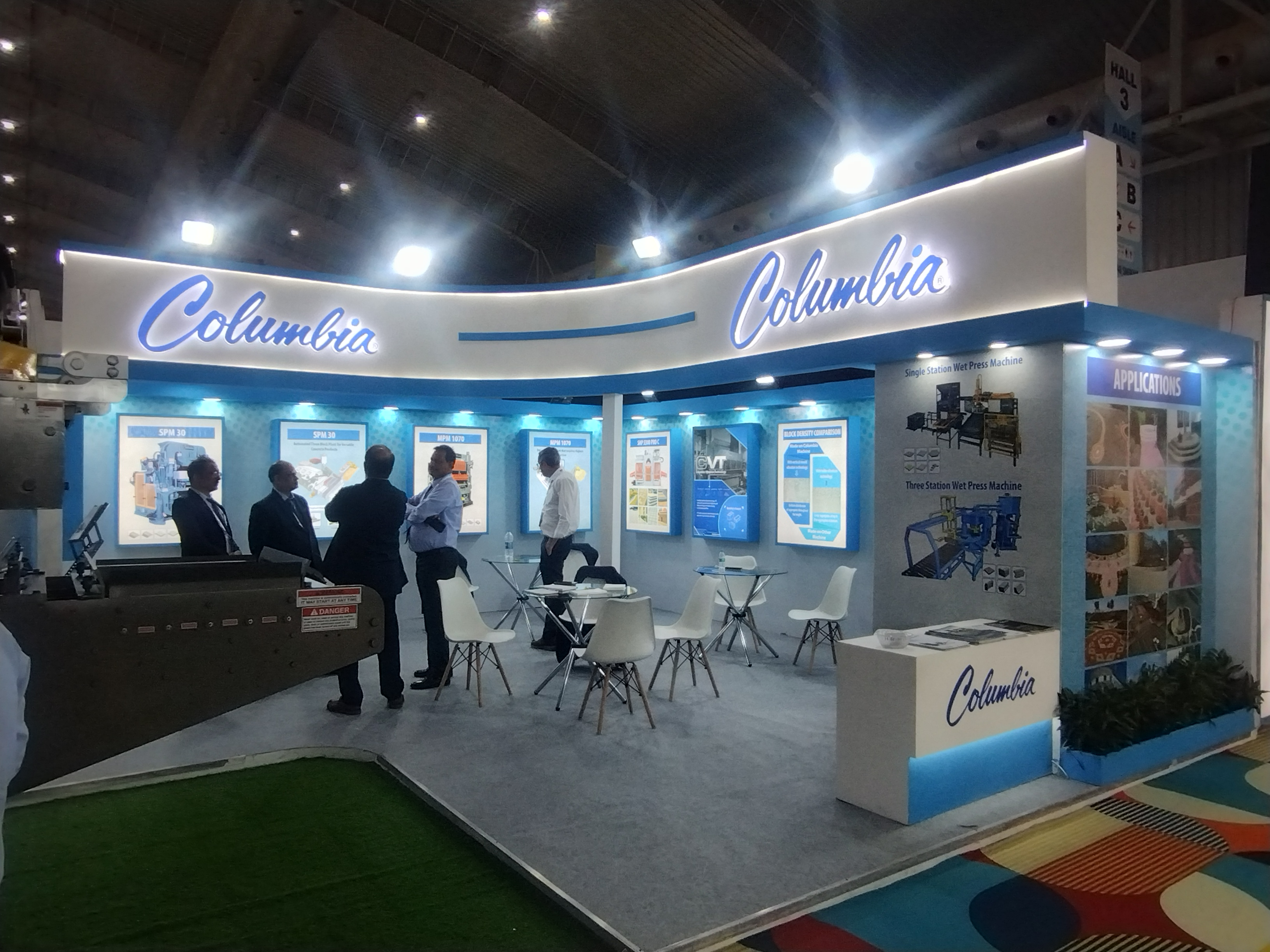
- Columbia Machine India at EXCON 2025, BIEC
- Formerly: Columbia Forge and Machine Works
- Company type: Public limited
- Genre: Cement
- Incorporated: Vancouver, Washington
- Founded: 1937 in Vancouver, Washington, US
- Founder: Fred Neth, Sr.
- Headquarters: Grand Boulevard, Vancouver, Washington, US
- Area served: 6 continents, 100 countries
- Key people: Rick Goode (CEO); Ted Yeigh (Director of marketing)
- Subsidiaries: many incl. Techmatik
- Website: columbiamachine.com; colmac.com

Columbia Machine Inc. is an American worldwide concrete products equipment manufacturer company, based in Vancouver, Washington.

Columbia Machine is functional in 100 countries across 6 different continents.

== History ==
In 1937, Fred Neth, Sr. opened a small shop called ′Columbia Forge and Machine Works′ in Vancouver, Washington, which later was developed as Columbia Machine.

== Techmatik ==
Techmatik is one of the subsidiaries of Columbia Machine, which is functional in 52 countries.
