= Columbia, Arizona =

Ghost town in Yavapai County

- Ghost town
- Location within the state of Arizona Columbia, Arizona (the United States)
- Coordinates: 34°02′01″N 112°18′38″W
- Country: United States
- State: Arizona
- County: Yavapai
- Elevation: 2,200 ft (670 m)
- Time zone: UTC-7 (Mountain (MST))
  - Summer (DST): UTC-7 (MST)
- Area code: 928
- FIPS code: 04-14975
- GNIS feature ID: 24376

Columbia is a ghost town in Yavapai County, Arizona, United States. It has an estimated elevation of 2,198 feet (670 m) above sea level.
