= Columbia Center (disambiguation) =

Columbia Center is the tallest skyscraper in Seattle.

Columbia Center may also refer to:

- Columbia Center (Troy), twin towers in Troy, Michigan
- Columbia Center, a shopping mall in Kennewick, Washington
- Columbia Center, Ohio, an unincorporated community
- Columbia Center, New York, a hamlet in Herkimer County, New York

== See also ==
- Columbia Building (disambiguation)
