= Columbia Union School District =

School district in California, United States

Address
- 22540 Parrotts Ferry Road Columbia, California, 95310; United States

District information
- Type: Public
- Grades: K–8
- NCES District ID: 0609480

Students and staff
- Students: 433 (2020–2021)
- Teachers: 23.99 (FTE)
- Staff: 19.67 (FTE)
- Student–teacher ratio: 18.05:1

Other information
- Website: www.cusd49.com

Columbia Union School District is a public school district based in Tuolumne County, California, which serves 500 students in grades K–8.
