= The District (disambiguation) =

The District may refer to:

- The District, an American television police drama, aired on CBS from 2000 to 2004
- The District!, a 2004 Hungarian animated film
- The District (production company), founded by film director Ruben Fleischer and David Bernard
- The District of Columbia, commonly referred to as Washington, the District or simply D.C.
- District 9, a science-fiction film

== See also ==
- District
- The District Sleeps Alone Tonight, 2003 song by The Postal Service
