= Columbia High School (Burbank, Washington) =

Public secondary school in Burbank, Washington (USA)

Coordinates: 46°12′00″N 119°00′26″W

Location
- 787 Maple Street; Burbank, (Walla Walla County), Washington 99323; United States

Information
- Type: Public high school
- Principal: Kyle Miller
- Teaching staff: 13.67 (FTE)
- Enrollment: 223 (2023-2024)
- Student to teacher ratio: 16.31
- Colors: Purple and gold
- Nickname: Coyotes

Columbia High School, located in Burbank, Washington, is a public high school serving 230 students in grades nine through 12. The current principal is Kyle Miller.

The student body is 77% White, 20% Hispanic, and 1% each American Indian, Asian, and black.
