= Camp Columbia (Hanford) =

Washington, a prison camp during and after World War II

Coordinates: 46°22′10″N 119°26′32″W

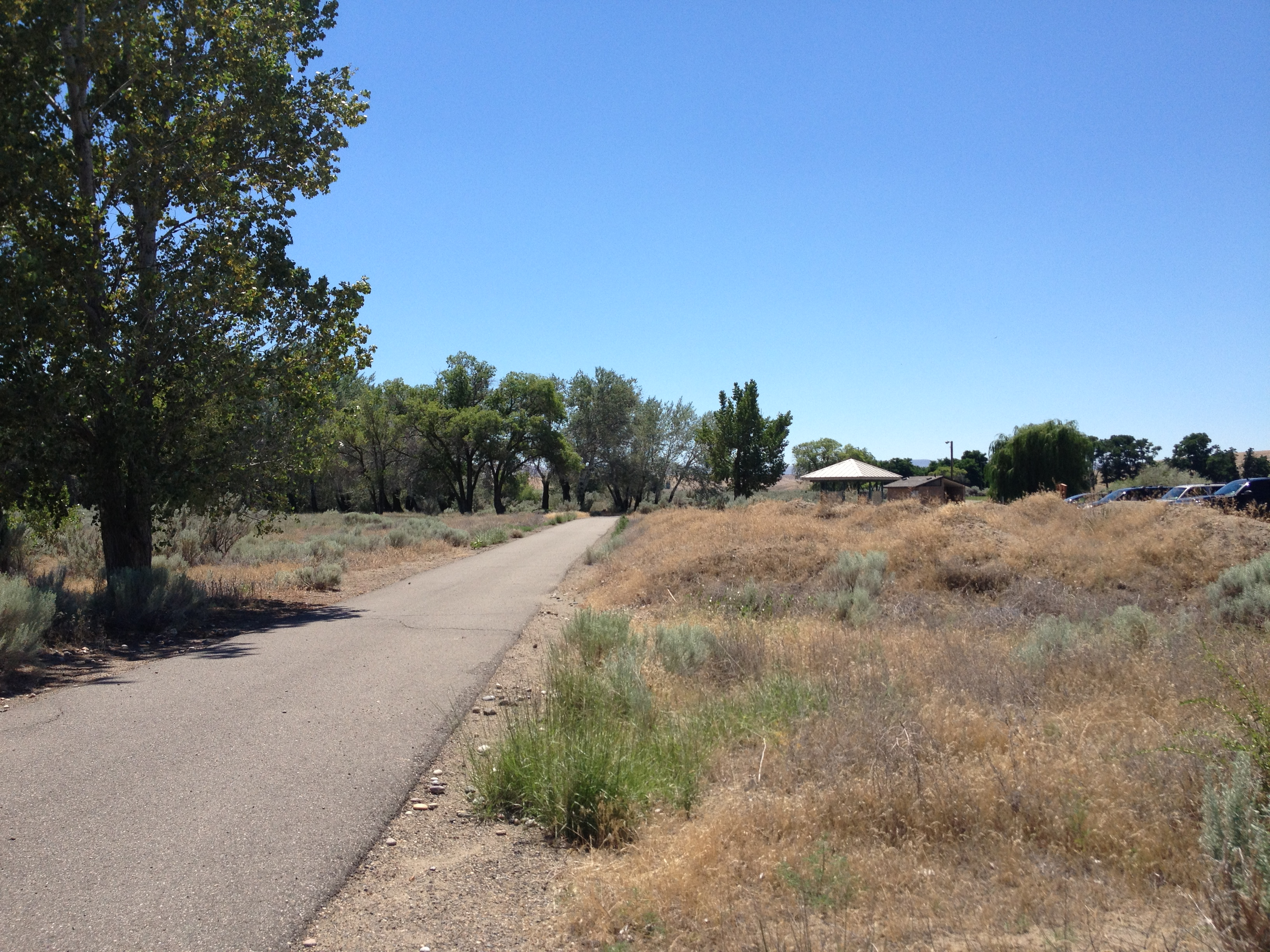
Camp Columbia on the Yakima River in Washington State. Information kiosk commemorating the prison camp is visible in center of picture.

Camp Columbia or Columbia Camp was a prison labor camp established on the north shore of the Yakima River opening on February 1, 1944, near Horn Rapids. The camp was operated between February 1944 and October 1947 by Federal Bureau of Prisons to provide labor supporting the Hanford Site. The camp was used to house "minimum-custody-type improvable male offenders," who had no more than one year to serve. These were violators of national defense, wartime and military laws. Included were conscientious objectors, violators of rationing and price support laws, those convicted of espionage, sabotage and sedition and those convicted by military courts martial. Aliens who failed to register were also in this category but none of them were sent here because the camp was located on the southern edge of the 670 square miles (1,740 km^{2}) Hanford Site.

== Facilities ==
The 25-acre labor camp had a number of Quonset prefab buildings, and barracks to house both prisoners and staff. The camp was built by contractors under contract to the Manhattan District of the Corps of Engineers. Former Civilian Conservation Corps buildings moved from Winifred, Montana, were used. Facilities at the camp included five barracks buildings, an office building, a mess hall, a hospital, a recreation hall, storage facilities and a utilities building. Heating was provided by a central steam system. There were no fences around the camp, as the geography itself was a deterrent to escape.

== Operation as a federal prison labor camp ==
Over the period Camp Columbia was open, it housed a total of 1,300 prisoners. The prisoners were brought in from the prison at McNeil Island Federal Penitentiary, and worked in fruit orchards on land which had been condemned by the Federal government in order to provide buffer space for the nuclear production facility known as the Hanford Site. Over 5,600 tons of fruit were processed and canned for military use. Because of its close proximity to the top secret Hanford project, only prisoners who were American citizens were sent there. As many as 290 prisoners were housed there at any given time.

The staff included up to 40 guards under the direction of a warden, Harold E. Taylor, who relocated from McNeil Island. The prisoners were known to occasionally stray down to the river to fish, but only 12 were known to have escaped from the area.

Work was not limited to agricultural activities. One of the 1945 actions undertaken by prisoners was demolition of the wartime construction camp near the old Hanford townsite, where nearly 50,000 workers had lived while constructing the reactors and reprocessing facilities at the Hanford site.

== Post-prison operation ==
After the camp was officially shut down on October 10, 1947, the facility was used to house workers for the Hanford project railroad and other site workers until 1949. The camp was then used by the US Army Corps of Engineers to house those working on various levee projects completed in conjunction with construction of the McNary Dam.

Camp Columbia was finally abandoned in 1950, and the facilities were dismantled and removed. Some of the original Quonset huts were moved to Richland, and could be seen there until the early 1990s.

== Current use ==
In 1966 the federal government turned the area over to Benton County for use as a park. Today the site of Camp Columbia is occupied by Horn Rapids County Park, a day-use park with a camp ground, a boat launch, a nature trail and equestrian facilities above the Horn Rapids dam. The park includes a kiosk commemorating Camp Columbia.

== See also ==
- Other places named Camp Columbia
