= Mount Columbia =

Mount Columbia may refer to:

- Mount Columbia (Canada), on the border of Alberta and British Columbia
- Mount Columbia (Colorado), United States
- Mount Columbia (Manquin, Virginia), United States, a historic house
