= County (disambiguation) =

A county is a geographical region of a country used for administrative or other purposes.

County may also refer to:

- County (United States), a level of local government below a U.S. state or federal territory
- Counties of China, third level political subdivisions in the People's Republic of China
- County (Taiwan), an administrative division in the Republic of China (Taiwan)
- Gaelic Athletic Association county, a division of the Gaelic Athletic Association
- County (ward), an electoral division of Liverpool, England
- Slang for County jail
- The County, a 2019 Icelandic film

Counties, in addition to being the plural for "county", may refer to:

- Counties Manukau Rugby Union, the governing body for rugby union in the Franklin District of New Zealand
