= Columbia Elementary School District =

School district in California

Address
- 10140 Old Oregon Trail Redding, California, 96003; United States

District information
- Type: Public
- Grades: K–12
- NCES District ID: 0609450

Students and staff
- Students: 668 (2020–2021)
- Teachers: 39.0 (FTE)
- Staff: 57.88 (FTE)
- Student–teacher ratio: 17.13:1

Other information
- Website: columbiasd.com

Columbia Elementary School District, located in Redding, California, is a school district on Redding's far east side. It is home to one elementary school and one middle school.
