= Juneau Mountain Rescue =

Alaskan organization

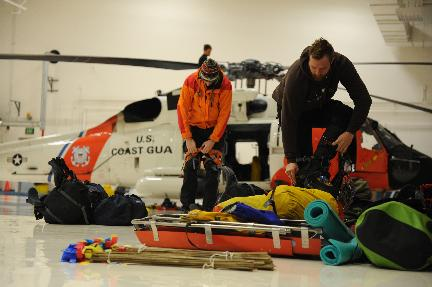
- Members of Juneau Mountain Rescue prepare gear for a rescue mission, facilitated by the US Coast Guard, in 2011
- Founded: 1982
- Type: Public Safety, Search and Rescue
- Location: Juneau, Alaska
- Region served: Southeast Alaska, United States
- Method: Mountain Rescue, Rope Rescue, Avalanche Rescue
- Website: juneaumountainrescue.org

Juneau Mountain Rescue (JMR) is a mountain search and rescue agency, located in Juneau, Alaska, United States. JMR is a member of the Alaska Search and Rescue Association, and facilitates rescues involving wilderness terrain, rope rescues on rock faces, ice and snow fields, glaciers, and during avalanches, medical evacuations, missing persons cases, aircraft crashes and other disasters. An all-volunteer organization, JMR coordinates with Capital City Fire/Rescue, the Juneau Police Department, the Alaska State Troopers, the United States Coast Guard, and other emergency response agencies during search and rescue operations.

== Operational history ==
Juneau Mountain Rescue was founded in 1982 after Steve Lewis taught a series of high-angle rescue classes in the Spring, Summer and Fall of 1982. Founding members: Steve Lewis, Bob Poe and Cathy Poe, and Jeff Badger. In 1989, Lewis, Cynda Stanek, and William (Bill) Wildes incorporated JMR. Lewis served as JMR's director until 2009 – having completed more than 212 search, rescue and recovery operations. Since 2004, JMR has been a fully accredited member of the international Mountain Rescue Association (MRA), having passed a rigorous test of JMR's rescue abilities at Juneau's Eaglecrest Ski Area. At the time of its accreditation, JMR was one of 56 mountain rescue agencies accredited by the MRA.

Juneau Mountain Rescue operates under the FCC call sign WPZP295 for radio communications. The call sign is currently licensed until February 11, 2034.

== Notable incidents ==
The Coast Guard and Juneau Mountain Rescue recover body of pilot Fariah Peterson from crash site

Coast Guard honors JMR team for 1999 Mendenlhall Glacier Temsco helicopter rescue. Eyewitness Accounts.

Fall 2005, Steve Lewis, founding member and director of Juneau Mountain Rescue, Bowler said, “puts the ‘rescue’ into the search-and-rescue business.

In September1999, 6 rescued after helicopter crashes on glacier.

In December 2000, a Bellanca Scout airplane carrying former Routt County, Colorado Sheriff Ed Burch, at the time working as a flight instructor, and another man went missing during a training flight near Juneau. Juneau Mountain Rescue, working with other agencies, including the local Civil Air Patrol and the Army National Guard, found pieces of the Scout between Douglas and Admiralty Island. The plane's fuselage and passengers were never found.

In January 2011, JMR volunteers, working with the Alaska State Troopers and the Coast Guard, rescued an injured hiker on Ripikski Mountain, near Haines. A Coast Guard crew on a MH-60 Jayhawk helicopter, dispatched from Sitka, transported the hiker to Bartlett Regional Hospital in Juneau.

In March 2014, two teenage boys, one a local resident and the other a visitor from Switzerland, got lost hiking on Mount Juneau. The teens were able to call for help on a cell phone, and told emergency dispatchers that they were "cold and disoriented". JMR volunteers, working with a commercial helicopter company, located the teenagers and returned them to town.

In May 2014, a woman named Sharon Buis was reported missing in the area of Juneau's Mount Roberts. A search was coordinated by JMR on both Mount Juneau and Mount Roberts, with parts of the effort being facilitated by use of the Mount Roberts Tramway. JMR coordinated with the Alaska State Troopers, and the US Coast Guard during the lengthy search. Despite an exhaustive search, Buis was never found. After several days of searching, the case was transferred to the Juneau Police Department, and is an active missing persons case.

On February 15, 2015, four hikers were rescued by members of JMR, after becoming stranded in mountainous wilderness in the Thane area of Juneau. The hikers suffered injuries related to cold weather conditions, and were taken to Bartlett Regional Hospital.

Coast Guard and Juneau Mountain Rescue have recovered the body of pilot Fariah Peterson from the crash site, according to an Alaska State Troopers dispatch.

Mountain search and rescue groups honor team members lost during rescue operations.

Below is a general list of early JMR search and rescue operations with outcomes if known.

- Below are search and rescue Operation where Juneau Mountain Rescue played a significant role in the operation.
- Search and technical rescue or tourist, Angel, on the side of Mt. Juneau. July 2002.
- Search and recovery of 10-year-old girl who fell into Ebner Falls. June 2002.
- Multitude of lost hunters on Admiralty, Douglas Islands and the mainland. JMR has been on too many such missions to list separately.
- JMR searches for elderly tourist who wondered off on Mt. Roberts near the Tram. September 11, 12 and 13, 2001 JMR searches, again, for body in May of 2002. Never found
- Search and rescue of overdue boating party near Point Bridget. May 2002.
- Search and technical rescue of man at 1200-foot level below the tram. August 2001.
- Piper Cherokee Six operated by LAB hits mountain near Glacier Bay. JMR, National Guard, NTSB, and the FAA recover 6 fatalities on the steep terrain. 2001
- Search and Rescue operation of 4 stranded people when raft over turned on Herbert River. JMR, Seadogs, CCFR, and USCG were involved in this SAR. 2001.
- Two climbers assisted off of Chop Gully after ice climbing. February 2000.
- Search and Recovery operation of 17 year old on the cliffs of Mt. Juneau on Chop Gully. Signs were posted by JMR (provided free by SignPro) warning of dangers of Mt. Juneau. 2001
- Search for aircraft that left Haines for Gustavus. Oil slick in water found after a week of search last reported point. Suspected two fatalities. Aircraft never recovered May 1998.
- Plane leaves Juneau with two on board. Parts of aircraft found in water. Beaches searched by JMR and the Forest Service.
- Technical recovery of hiker who fell off cliffs while trying to retrieve pack that fell. 1998.
- Teenage girl rescue (technical) alive by JMR on 300’ rocks near glaciers moraine. August 1997.
- Herbert Glacier Rescue. Ten victims from three different helicopter incidents 9/99. No fatalities. 9-person mountain rescue team from JMR and CCFR.
- Herbert Glacier helicopter crash and recovery. 7 Fatalities. June 99
- Two women on Mt McGinnis. One broken ankle; one hypothermic. One quit breathing but both women rescued alive. 1997
- Search and later recovery of cc skier near Troy Pass who was swept away by avalanche. 1995.
- Five-day search for person that made wrong turn – was out of search area. He walked out. June 97.
- Two people rescued alive from Mt. Juneau by helicopter. JMR guided in helicopter.
- Search for Elizabeth Nye. March 2000. Found under outside steps on last day of search.
- Search for lost hunter in Hoonah. Was found following. Spring 1999.
- Search and Rescue of father and daughter on Heinzelman Ridge. July 1996
- Recovery of Tom Smalley after he fell 1120 feet down mineshaft. Kensington Mine. November 1995.
- Search and Recovery of Ben Blackgoat off Perseverance Trail. Nov 1995
- Army Guard C-12 crashes. November 1992. Two-day recovery of 8 Fatalities. 2850 feet, steep, avalanche prone terrain.
- Two goat hunters search for and rescued on Lions Head Mountain. September 1993.
- Tom H., search of Mendenhall Glacier, West Glacier Trail. June 1993. Found body in glacier three years later.
- Alex Iliev, avalanche fatality. Troy Pass/Eaglecrest. February 1995.
- Aircraft accident, two fatalities, North of Petersburg. Sept. 1995.
- Dallas Hauk, Search of Douglas Island. Hypothermia Fatality. Nov 1993.
- Matt Dobson, Annahootz Mountain. Search and Technical Rescue. October 1998.
- Four teenagers on Thunder Mountain. Rescued May 1999
- Two teenagers rescued from steep cliffs above Granite Creek Basin. 1994.
- Brooke Young stuck on a ledge over Ebner Falls. July 1993
- Jeff Scharff Search. Fell into Ebner Falls. September 1995
- Search and rescue of 76-year-old man on Heinzelman Ridge. September 1995
- Mt. Orville, Yakutat, avalanche --3 fatalities February 23, 1995
- Rescue of aircraft accident investigator after he fell while conducting investigation on slippery slope. July 1993
- Anne Gibson and Rhonda Reid. Overnight search and rescue on Mount McGinnis. Provided shelter, comfort and later resuscitation to hypothermic victim. Both rescued alive.
- Rescue of climbing teenager on rocks near Mendenhall Glacier. July 1997.
- Rescue of 12 year old in crevasse after sledding accident on glacier. Feb 1995
- Recovery of hiker who fell on cliffs near Mount Bollard. July 1997
- Jeff Scharff, Gold Creek/Ebner Falls. July 1995. High angle searching of waterfalls.
- One aircraft accident fatality, Yakutat. 270-foot drop from Coast Guard helicopter to very steep terrain in order to complete the technical recovery. July 1994.
- 17-year-old from Connecticut stuck on the rocks on Nugget Falls at Mendenhall Glacier. All night rescue requiring three teams climbing and repelling to victim. Victim later asked us what took so long. 1995.
- Five sailors technically rescued from USS Roark on cliffs of Mount Juneau. One with broken back. July 1992
- LAB plane emergency landing on upper Herbert Glacier with 5 tourists on board. All rescued okay. August 1995.
- Dee Lacey search, Juneau. 8-Day search effort. 5000+ person hours. Feb. 1992. Turned out she was committing fraud and was hiding out. New “Dee Lacey” law passed.
- Haines Airways crash. Recovery Operation. 6 fatalities. Steep Terrain. August 1991
