= Capital City Fire/Rescue =

Fire department in Juneau, Alaska, US

Capital City Fire/Rescue (CCFR)

Operational area
- Country: United States
- State: Alaska
- City: Juneau

Agency overview
- Fire chief: Thomas Hatley
- Motto: "Readiness, dedication, service"

Website
- www.juneau.org/ccfr/

Capital City Fire/Rescue (CCFR) provides fire suppression and emergency medical services to the city of Juneau, Alaska, United States.

With service to Juneau, CCFR provides emergency services to the second most populous city in Alaska after Anchorage, and the fourth largest metropolitan area behind Anchorage, the Fairbanks North Star Borough, and the Matanuska-Susitna Borough.

Areas served by CCFR include Douglas Island, Lemon Creek, the Mendenhall Valley, Juneau International Airport, Thane, University of Alaska Southeast and local areas of the Tongass National Forest.

== History ==
Medic 1, an ambulance and paramedic unit operated by Capital City Fire/Rescue, in downtown Juneau on April 18, 2015

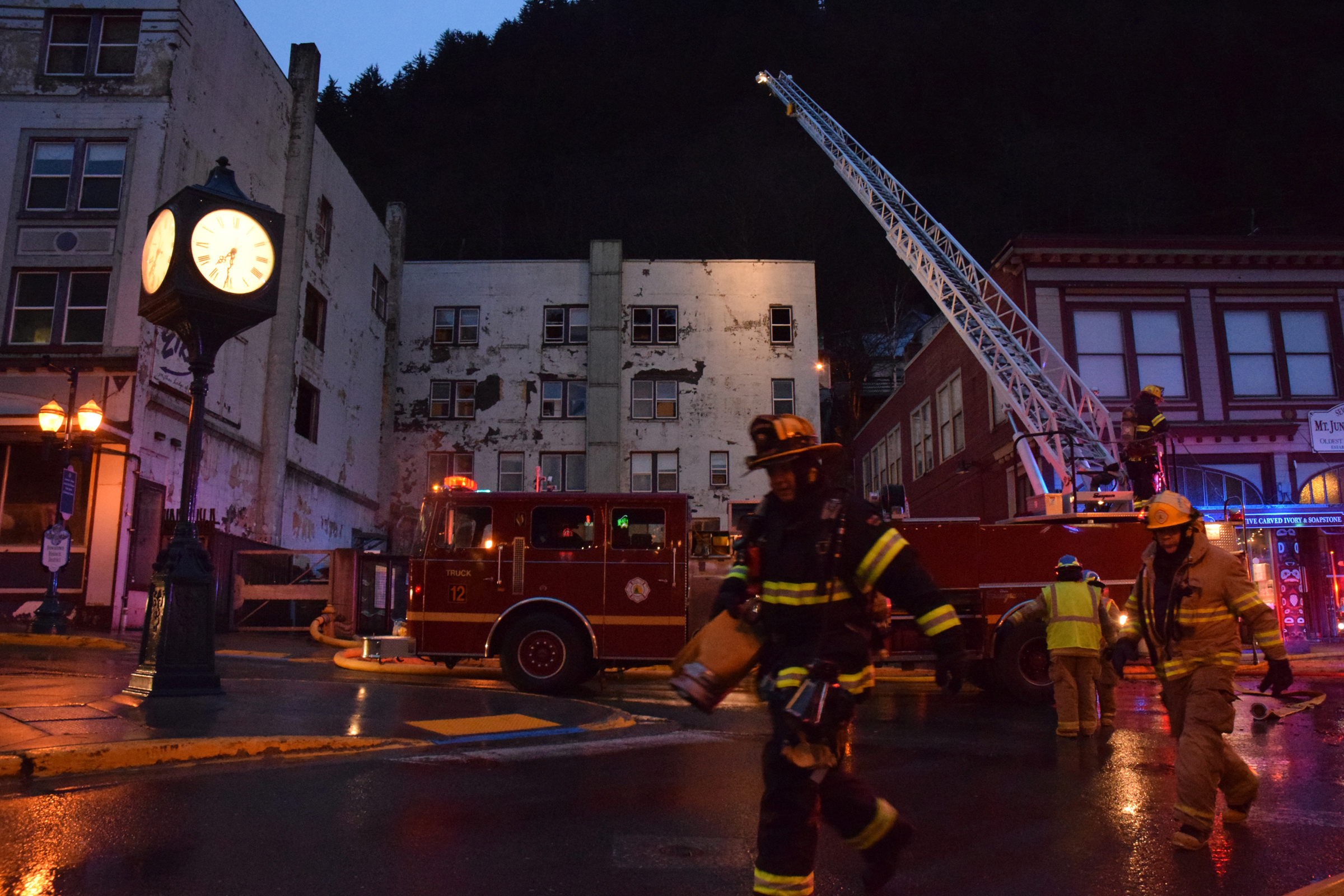
CCFR fights a fire in the abandoned Gastineau Apartments (left) on March 21, 2015

The first fire agency in the Juneau area was founded in 1899 as the Juneau Volunteer Fire Department, consisting of a single, hand-powered hose cart. Gradually, as the local population increased and spread further out, other fire companies formed and sprouted up in the area. These included the Douglas Fire Department in 1898, the private fire company at the Treadwell Mine, and the Auke Bay VFD in 1952. In 1992, to better manage emergency services in the community, all of the fire companies in the Juneau area, including Glacier Fire District, Auke Bay Vol. Fire Department, Douglas Vol. Fire Department, and the Juneau Fire Department merged into Capital City Fire/Rescue. This was a full merger, which is why units and personnel, regardless of district, wear the same uniform under the same "chain of command."

The first alarm system consisted of a bell installed on the boardwalk, adjacent to the downtown ship docks. Upgrades to the alarm system began in 1915, and the methods of notifying fire fighters who are off duty that they are needed became more high tech over the years. As of 2016, all CCFR members are issued both a pager and a dispatching application for smartphones.

In 2006, the City and Borough of Juneau purchased a mobile dispatch center, with a grant from the Department of Homeland Security. The mobile command center is equipped to provide multiple agencies access to dispatch, while providing office space for emergency personnel who are in command at the site of a major incident.

== Current day ==
As of 2022, Capital City Fire and Rescue is made up of 56 paid and 65 volunteer firefighters and Emergency Medical Technicians, as well as 9 administrative support staff, who serve over 31,000 residents in the city and borough of Juneau. The Fire Chief Richard Etheridge has led the department since 2010. He is President of the Alaska Fire Chiefs Association and a board member for the Western Fire Chiefs Association. Paid, professional firefighter/paramedics work out of the Downtown and Glacier/Juneau International Airport stations offering fire/rescue, Advanced Life Support-staffed ambulance service, mobile integrative health, sobering center and aircraft crash rescue and firefighting services. Some ALS firefighters are also trained to be able to fly medevac missions via local contract helicopter companies, however, most are handled by outside agencies. Volunteer members, including those enrolled in the department's "live-in" program, respond to calls out of the Douglas Island, Auke Bay and Lynn Canal stations. Due to the complexity of the environment Juneau lies in, the department also offers "Special Teams" which include rope and technical rescue and water/ice rescue teams. Annually, Capital City Fire Rescue offers an "in-house" Alaska State Firefighter I & II academy as well as a state approved EMT class to help train volunteer recruits, held at the agency's Regional Training Center.

911 and emergency dispatching services are handled by the City of Juneau, who also dispatch Juneau Police, U.S. Forest Service and NOAA law enforcement as well as the Alaska State Troopers.

Adding to the challenges faced by the emergency system in the land-locked city of Juneau are the influx of upwards of 30,000 additional people a day from cruise ship and tourist traffic during the summer months. May through October, CCFR hires four additional firefighter/EMT's to staff a Basic Life Support ambulance downtown in a seasonal hire program to facilitate medical transports from the cruise ships, Bartlett Regional Hospital and air ambulance services. During this six-month period the extra ambulance will handle approximately 500 calls for service. This program frees up the Advanced Life Support ambulances to continue to respond to emergencies that require the higher level of care. This has reduced the number of times that all in-service ambulances were unavailable due to the call load and reduced response times across the city and borough. CCFR runs a community outreach program and sobering center for public inebriates. CCFR also runs a mobile integrative health program, providing advance care in the home or street to reduce demand on emergency services and emergency room decompression.

At the close of 2021, CCF/R announced that it had responded to 5100 calls for service, which broke down to 100 fire calls, 3,600 medical emergencies, 215 fire alarms, CCFR personnel responded to an average of 14.3 calls per day throughout the year, with numbers as high as 35 in the peak summertime months. CCFR is a department growing in volume steadily every year by 4%.

== Volunteer, cadet and live-in programs ==
At any given time, CCFR has a volunteer force of approximately 70 members, allowing a reserve force to back up the full-time staffed fire stations. Volunteer firefighters are assigned to the Auke Bay, Lynn Canal and Douglas Island fire stations, but can also backfill the fire stations Downtown and at the airport. Volunteer training is varied depending on the member. Some members volunteer as "Scene Support," which includes rehab operations, tool and equipment running and other basic "non-entry firefighter" operations, while others will move through a full fire academy, becoming Alaska State Firefighter I and II. EMS-only members will usually dual-function as Scene Support.

CCFR also offers a high school career-exploration "Cadet" program, in which teenagers ages 14–18 can experience the fire and emergency services hands-on. Following the application process, Cadets begin their time with a four-month long academy, in which they learn basic fire service history and operations. Upon graduation, Cadets are utilized as Scene Support members, and can ride-a-long with volunteer and career members on emergency calls, gaining an immersive, first-hand experience in the fire service.

Capital City Fire Rescue offers a "live-in" program, where some volunteer firefighters, after a selective application and interview process, are allowed to live in firehouses as residents. This program allows CCFR to "staff" apparatus in areas that otherwise would see relatively longer response times, such as Lynn Canal or Douglas Island. Most "live-ins" hold both Firefighter I and EMT certification at bare minimum and staff the firehouses from approx. 7:00 p.m. to 7:00 a.m. the following day. While this program reduces the average response time of personnel arriving on scene of a call in the city and borough of Juneau, it does not always guarantee 100% coverage for that area, as many "live-ins" also maintain full-time jobs outside of the fire department.

== Notable incidents ==
In January 1898, a fire caused by an exploding lamp in the Marshall's office burned down the city jail and courthouse. The fire resulted in the release of 14 inmates, most of whom escaped. Both buildings were a total loss and only a few of the prisoners were recaptured, however most court records, locked in a fire-resistant safe, survived. The "Evening News" out of San Jose, California, reported that "the illumination was seen for forty miles up Lynn Canal, and it lighted up beautifully the surrounding mountains of snow." The fire is largely regarded as the "final straw" in the need for implementing a town fire department.

In March 1911, a fire started by an inattentive cook at the Douglas Grill nearly burned down the town of Douglas. While there was a quick response by the Douglas Fire Department, the firefighters were met with frozen fire hydrants and the fire quickly grew out of control, spreading to the Douglas Hotel, Island Hotel and Lyric theater. Mutual aid was struck and personnel from the Juneau Fire Department, who responded with two engines and over 600 feet of hose, were brought over by the ferry steamer Georgia. Approx. 100 firefighting personnel from the Douglas-Treadwell Mine Fire Department also responded. The firefighters were able to stop the fire from spreading to the rest of the town by using the metal corrugated wall in the Reine Saloon as a check point, and pushing the fire towards two empty lots. Despite gloomy outlooks by citizens at the scene, the firefighters were able to make the stop and are largely credited with saving the town.

On May 24, 1946, during overhaul operations following a series of stubborn fires at the Perelle Apartments in downtown Juneau, volunteer firefighter Bill Rudolph fell approx. 20 feet off a ladder, landing on his head and shoulders, knocking him briefly unconscious. Rudolph died 7 days later from injuries resulting from the fall, becoming the Juneau area's only firefighter line of duty death. Rudolph was stationed in Juneau as a Chief Boatswain's Mate in the U.S. Coast Guard.

On August 15, 2004, Capital City Fire/Rescue responded to a fire in the Skinner Building, on Front Street in downtown Juneau. The 108-year-old structure contained 18 businesses. During the fire, the heat and smoke caused the evacuation of over 1,000 people in the local downtown area, and closed most business down. As the fire intensified, it spread to another building next door. The Skinner Building was completely destroyed, and total damages were in excess of one million dollars.

On November 5, 2012, the 4-story Gastineau Apartments on Franklin Street in downtown Juneau caught fire. Every available member of Capital City Fire/Rescue responded to the blaze, which burned throughout the night. The apartments and other local buildings were evacuated by CCFR and members of the Juneau Police Department. The building was a total loss. During the fire fighting effort, power was shut off to downtown Juneau, and members of the Alaska Army National Guard were deployed to keep people out of the evacuated area. Extra firefighters were brought in from Sitka on a Coast Guard helicopter, and even a member of the Anchorage Fire Department, who was visiting Juneau at the time, was also pressed into service. Despite the size of the fire, no injuries were reported.

== See also ==
- Anchorage Fire Department
- Juneau Mountain Rescue
