= Auke (disambiguation) =

The Auke are an Alaskan Native people. Auke may also refer to:

- Auke Mountain, named after the Auke people
- Auke Bay, Alaska, a bay in Juneau
- Auke Lake in Auke Bay
- Auke (name), a Dutch masculine given name
