= Auka =

Auka may refer to:

- Auka (company), a Norwegian financial technology firm
- Waorani language, commonly known as Sabela, also pejoratively as Auka or Auca
- Auka, a character in The Wheel on the School
- Auka, a dialect of the Nakanai language

== See also ==
- Auke (disambiguation)
