= Mount Juneau =

Mountain in Southeast Alaska

- Yadaa.at Kalé
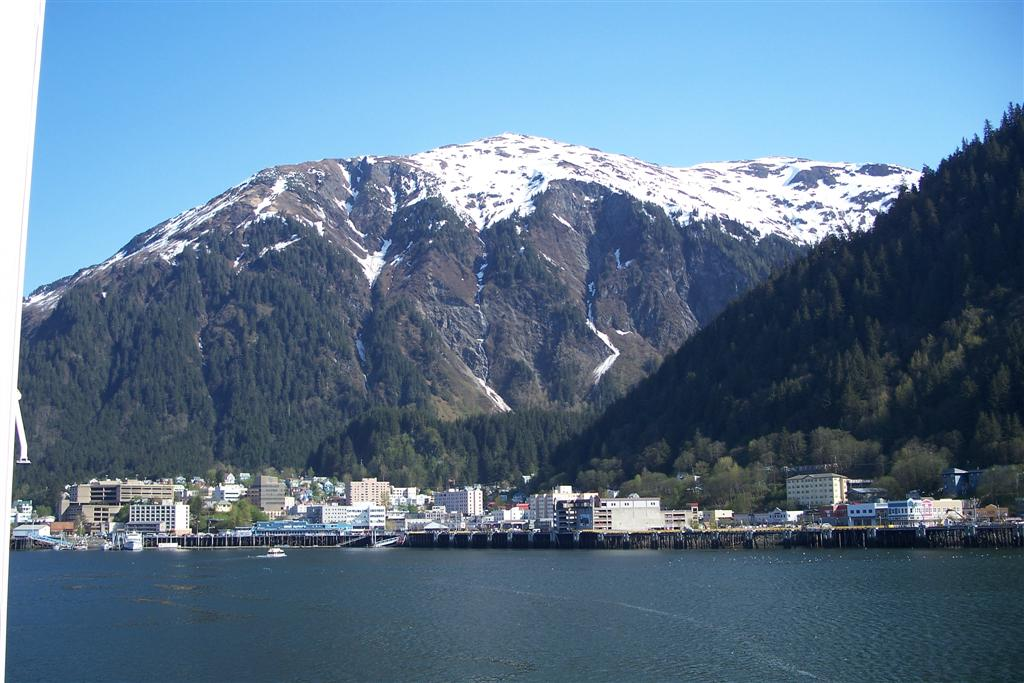
- Downtown Juneau and Mount Juneau

Highest point
- Elevation: 3,576 ft (1,090 m)
- Prominence: 295 ft (90 m)
- Coordinates: 58°19′10″N 134°24′22″W

Geography
- Location within Alaska
- Interactive map of Mount Juneau
- Location: Juneau City and Borough, Alaska, U.S.
- Parent range: Boundary Ranges
- Topo map: USGS Juneau B-2

Climbing
- First ascent: Unknown
- Easiest route: Scramble

Mount Juneau (Tlingit: Yadaa.at Kalé) is a 3,576-foot (1,090 m) massif in Southeast Alaska just one and a half miles (2.4 km) east of downtown Juneau, Alaska, in the Boundary Ranges.

== History ==
Mount Juneau is steeped in mining history. Originally named Gold Mountain in 1881 by miners, it was also named Bald Mountain in roughly 1896. The name "Juneau Mountain" was first used in the mining records by Pierre "French Pete" Erussard when he located mining claims on the mountain in 1888.

In 1976, it was proposed by Chuck Keen of Alaska Trams (later to become Mount Juneau Enterprises) that a jigback aerial tramway be built to the top of the mountain. The venture never reached fruition although Goldbelt Inc. did end up building Mount Roberts Tramway to the neighboring Mount Roberts.

== Weather ==
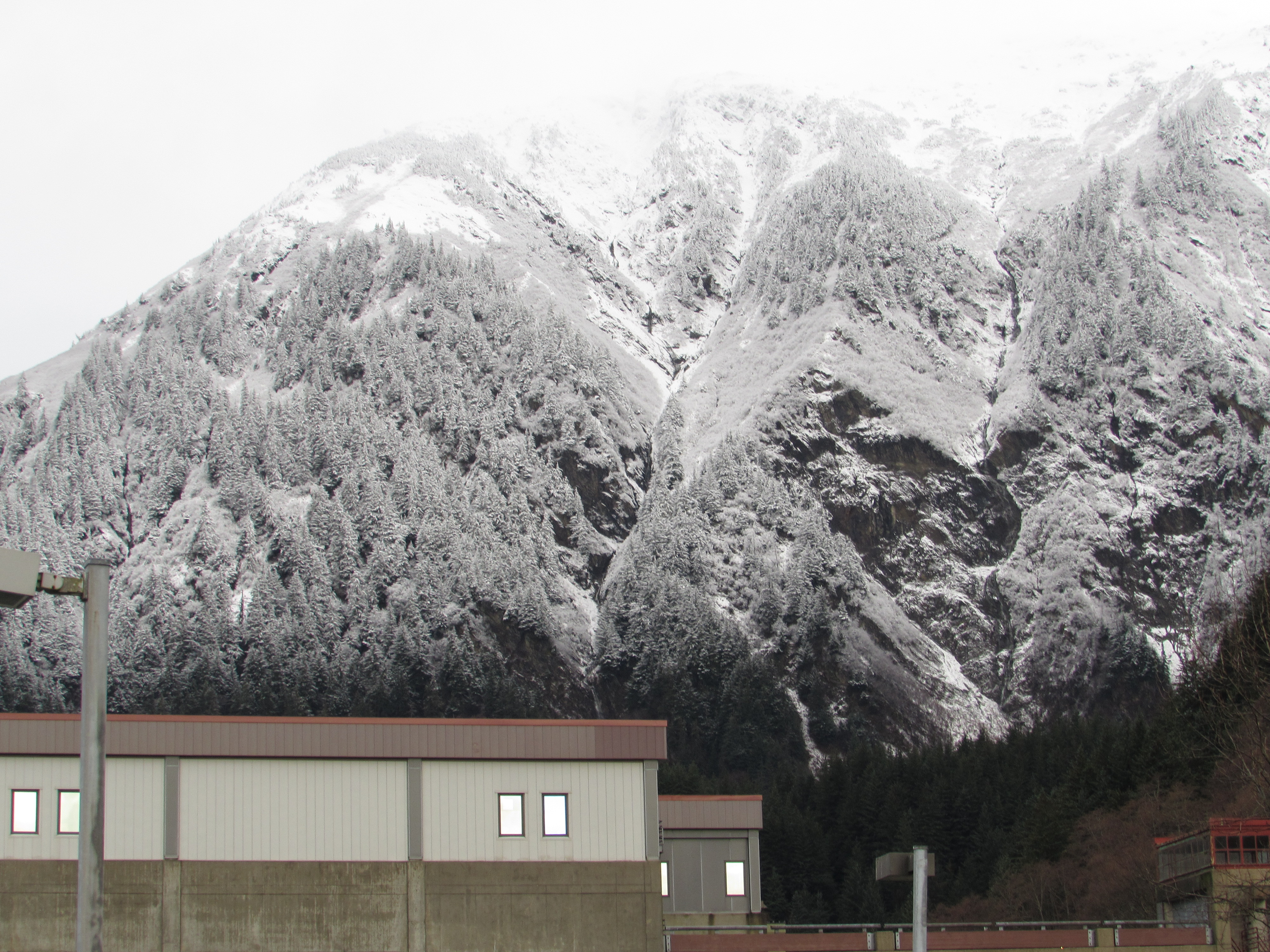
Mount Juneau, with fresh winter snow, on November 11, 2015

Mount Juneau receives an estimated 300% more rain than downtown Juneau (which receives 91 inches or 230 centimetres per year on average).

During winter, Mount Juneau is one of the preeminent avalanche threats to a major population center.

== Access ==
The trail to Mount Juneau's summit can be accessed via the Perseverance Trail about one mile (1.6 km) in from the trailhead. The trail features an assortment of alpine views as well although it traverses many steep slopes and caution is prudent in wet or snowy weather.

== 1962 avalanche ==
In March 1962 an avalanche slid down the south side of Mount Juneau. It started with a lot of snowfall coming from the north-east. Some of the snow at about 220 meters came loose causing the avalanche.

=== Damage ===
The avalanche caused damage to 34 houses. 7 were severely damaged, 9 were moderately damaged, and 18 had minor damage

To this day there is still a visible path that the avalanche took down the mountain.

=== Future prevention ===
After the avalanche the local government brought in a Swiss avalanche expert to assess the damage and propose possible prevention methods for when another avalanche occurred. They assessed that the avalanche could have been worse as it stopped right before hitting the neighborhood. They also said that building mounds that could divert the avalanche away is the best option. Future avalanche experts rebuked the idea since while this avalanche was powerful, more powerful ones are likely to occur in the same area. They stated that the best course of action is to move the neighborhood. Locals on the other hand were not fully convinced on moving, so the local government decided to mitigate further damages by banning the construction of add-ons in avalanche zones and by buying lots that could go to building homes in avalanche zones.
