= Auke Mountain =

Mountain in Alaska, United States

- Location within Alaska

Highest point
- Elevation: 1,795 ft (547 m)
- Coordinates: 58°23′33″N 134°42′46″W

Geography
- Location: Juneau, Alaska, U.S.
- Parent range: Boundary Ranges
- Topo map: USGS Juneau B-3

Auke Mountain is a mountain in the city and borough of Juneau, Alaska, United States. It is a part of the Boundary Ranges of the Coast Mountains in western North America. It is 1 mile (1.6 km) north of Fairhaven, Alaska, and 12 miles (19 km) northwest of the city of Juneau.

The mountain is named after the local Auke people; the name was first published by the United States Geological Survey (USGS) in 1912.

== See also ==
- Tolch Rock
