= USCGC Liberty =

U.S. Coast Guard vessel

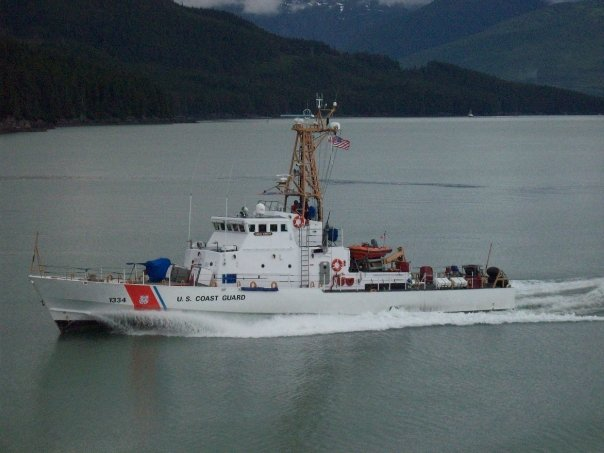
- USCGC Liberty, off the coast of Alaska, 2008.

History

United States
- Name: USCGC Liberty
- Commissioned: December 19, 1989
- Decommissioned: April 29, 2025
- Identification: MMSI number: 367949000; Callsign: NJHT
- Status: Active

General characteristics
- Class & type: Island-class patrol boat
- Displacement: 155 tons
- Length: 110 feet (34 m)
- Beam: 21 feet (6.4 m)
- Draft: 7 feet (2.1 m)
- Propulsion: 2 diesel engines
- Speed: 29.6 knots
- Complement: 2 officers, 16 enlisted
- Armament: Mk 38 25 mm chain gun; 2 × M2 .50-cal MG

USCGC Liberty (WPB-1334) was an Island-class cutter of the United States Coast Guard. Commissioned on December 19, 1989, she spent her first thirty-three years of service homeported in Juneau, Alaska, where she patrolled territorial waters, including the Inside Passage. In 2016, she won the Hopley Yeaton Cutter Excellence Award for outstanding operational and humanitarian achievements. From 2022 to 2025, she was reassigned to Valdez, Alaska. Liberty was decommissioned in Valdez on April 29, 2025.

== Design and characteristics ==
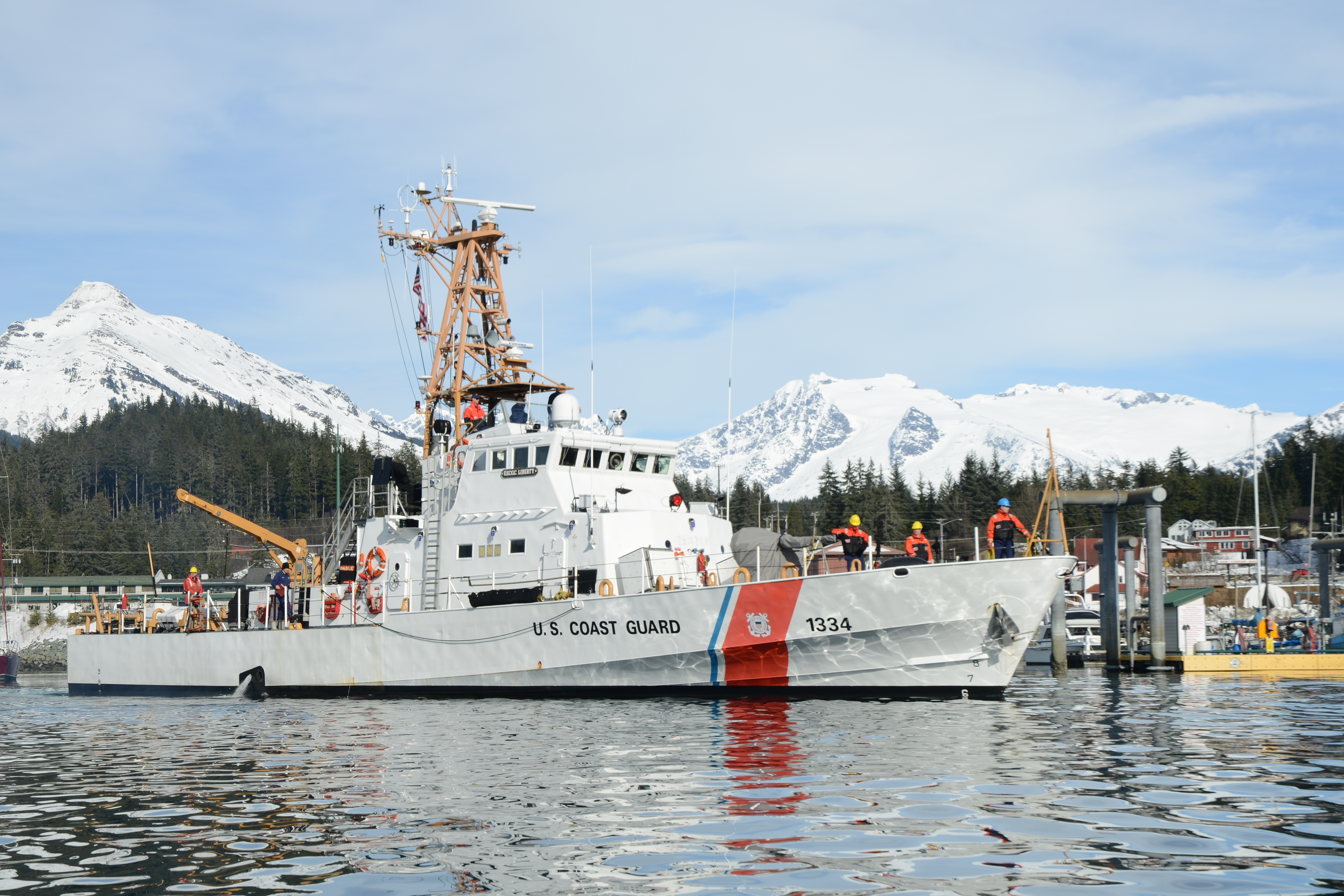
USCGC Liberty mooring at Auke Bay, Alaska

The Island-class patrol boats, including Liberty, were constructed in Bollinger Shipyards, Lockport, Louisiana. Their design was based on the British Vosper Thornycroft 33 metres (108 ft) patrol boats and have similar dimensions. Liberty had an overall length of 110 feet (34 m), a beam of 21 feet (6.4 m), and a draft of 7 feet (2.1 m) at full load. The patrol boat had a displacement of 155 tons at full load and 138 tons at half load.

The Coast Guard purchased 49 Island-class cutters, and over the course of their construction made several modifications. The ships were grouped into A, B, and C classes depending on their design. Liberty was a B-class ship and thus had heavier bow plating to prevent hull cracking in heavy seas, among other enhancements.

Liberty was powered by two Paxman Valenta 16 CM Diesel engines which drove two 5-blade propellers. She had two 99 kilowatts (135 PS; 133 shp) Caterpillar 3304T diesel generators for electrical power. Her hull was constructed from high-strength steel, and her superstructure and main deck were constructed from aluminium. Stern flaps were retrofitted to reduce hull friction and increase speed and fuel efficiency. Liberty had active fin stabilizers to improve her seakeeping characteristics.

The Island-class patrol boats had maximum sustained speeds of 29.6 knots (54.8 km/h; 34.1 mph). They were fitted with one 25mm machine gun and two Browning .50 Caliber Machine Gun. They were equipped with satellite navigation systems, collision avoidance systems, and surface radar. They had a range of 3,380 miles (2,940 nmi; 5,440 km) at 8 knots, and an at-sea endurance of five days.

Liberty carried one 18-foot rigid hull inflatable boat with seating for eight crew.

Liberty's complement was 2 officers and 16 enlisted crew.

Liberty's namesake was Liberty Island in New York Harbor, site of the Statue of Liberty.

== Operational history ==
Liberty was the 34th of the Island-class cutters. Her original cost was reported as $6.5 million. After commissioning, she was assigned to Juneau, where she moored at Auke Bay. She replaced USCGC Cape Carter at this station.

Her primary missions were law enforcement, fisheries management, search and rescue, and oil spill response. She is credited, along with Alaska State Troopers, with the largest hash oil seizure in Alaska history. On October 30, 2007 crew from Liberty boarded the fishing vessel 819 in the Ketchikan area. They found five half-pint jars of the drug with a street value between $40,000 and $50,000.

The United States and Canada disagree on the location of the maritime border in Dixon Entrance. This led to a series of seizures of Canadian fishing boats by Liberty in the disputed waters. Diane S. was fishing 400 yards into U.S. waters when she was seized on July 20, 1991. Eliza Joye was seized on July 29, 1991.. Serene was seized 875 yards north of the border claimed by the U.S. on July 20, 1992. A 1990 agreement between the two countries reduced fishing conflicts and Liberty's seizures of Canadian boats when it became effective in 1992. After the conflict with Canada faded, Liberty continued to board U.S.-flagged fishing boats to enforce fishing and safety regulations. In the summer of 2018, for instance, Liberty's boardings found five vessels in violation of various regulations.

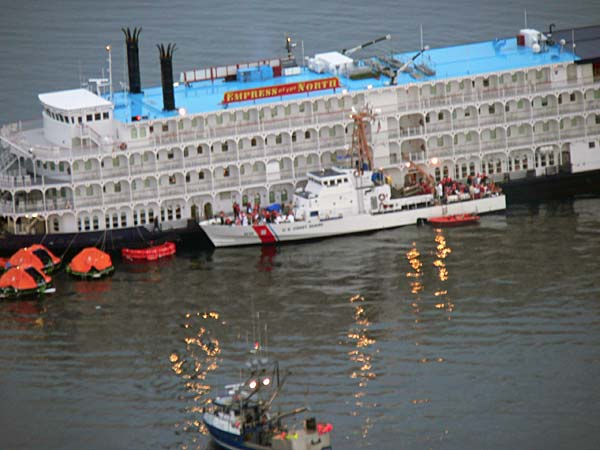
USCGC Liberty evacuating passengers from grounded Empress of the North, May 15, 2007

Liberty was involved in many search and rescue missions. Often, they consisted of assisting fishing vessels with mechanical problems. For example, in September 2001, Liberty rescued five crewmen from the fishing vessel Baranof Queen, which had been disabled off Cape Spencer. In other instances, the distressed vessel was wrecked. After the 38-foot (11.6 m) salmon-fishing vessel Belle-Tech was wrecked on the Gilanta Rocks (54°51′00″N 130°56′30″W) in Dixon Entrance on July 19, 1999, Liberty rescued her crew of two, which had abandoned ship in a small boat. Liberty took eight people off the beached charter yacht Alaskan Song in 2001. Sometimes, her searches were for a single person in a canoe. On a few occasions, however, Liberty was dispatched on rescue missions involving dozens or hundreds of people. At approximately 12:35 AM on May 15, 2007, the sternwheel cruise ship Empress of the North went aground on Hanus Reef at the eastern entrance of Icy Strait. She had 281 passengers and crew aboard. While her outer hull was pierced by a rock, the inner hull was intact and pumps were able to keep up with the flooding. Liberty, the ferry Columbia, and a number of nearby fishing boats responded. Liberty took off about 130 passengers and transferred them to Columbia. Private vessels evacuated the remaining passengers, and most were transferred to the ferry. All the passengers were off the stricken vessel by about 5:30 AM. Columbia arrived in Juneau at 11 AM with the passengers, while Liberty remained with Empress of the North. The grounded ship was able to refloat and make its way to Auke Bay under its own power, escorted by Liberty.

In July 2008, Liberty responded to another grounded cruise ship, Spirit of Glacier Bay. She ran onto a sandbar at the head of Tarr Inlet in Glacier Bay National Park. Her passengers were evacuated by park vessels before Liberty arrived. When the high tide refloated the cruise liner, Liberty escorted her to port in case further assistance was required. Liberty had assisted another disabled cruise liner, Spirit of Columbia, owned by the same company, Cruise West, as Spirit of Glacier Bay, just two months before.

After her decommissioning on April 29, 2025, Liberty sailed from Ketchikan, Alaska on May 14, 2025, in company with two other decommissioned Island-class patrol boats, Mustang and Naushon. At that time, Liberty and her two sister ships were earmarked to be transferred to the Columbian Navy via the Excess Defense Articles program.

Liberty was awarded the meritorious unit commendation several times in her career. In 2016, she won the Hopley Yeaton Cutter Excellence Award for outstanding operational and humanitarian achievements.

== Replacement plans ==
As early as the mid-2000s, the mechanical reliability of the aging Island-class ships became an issue. The Coast Guard began retiring Island-class cutters in 2012, replacing them with Sentinel-class fast-response cutters. In 2018, Juneau city officials believed that Liberty would be decommissioned in 2023, and they advocated with the Coast Guard that Liberty should be replaced by a fast response cutter home-ported at Auke Bay. In reply to an inquiry from a U.S. Senator in April 2018, the commandant of the Coast Guard indicated that the service planned to replace Liberty with a coastal patrol boat rather than a fast response cutter. Indeed, that is exactly what happened in 2022 when USCGC Reef Shark, a Marine Protector-class patrol boat, was assigned to Juneau. Liberty was reassigned to Valdez, Alaska.
