= USCGC Reef Shark =

U. S. Coast Guard patrol boat

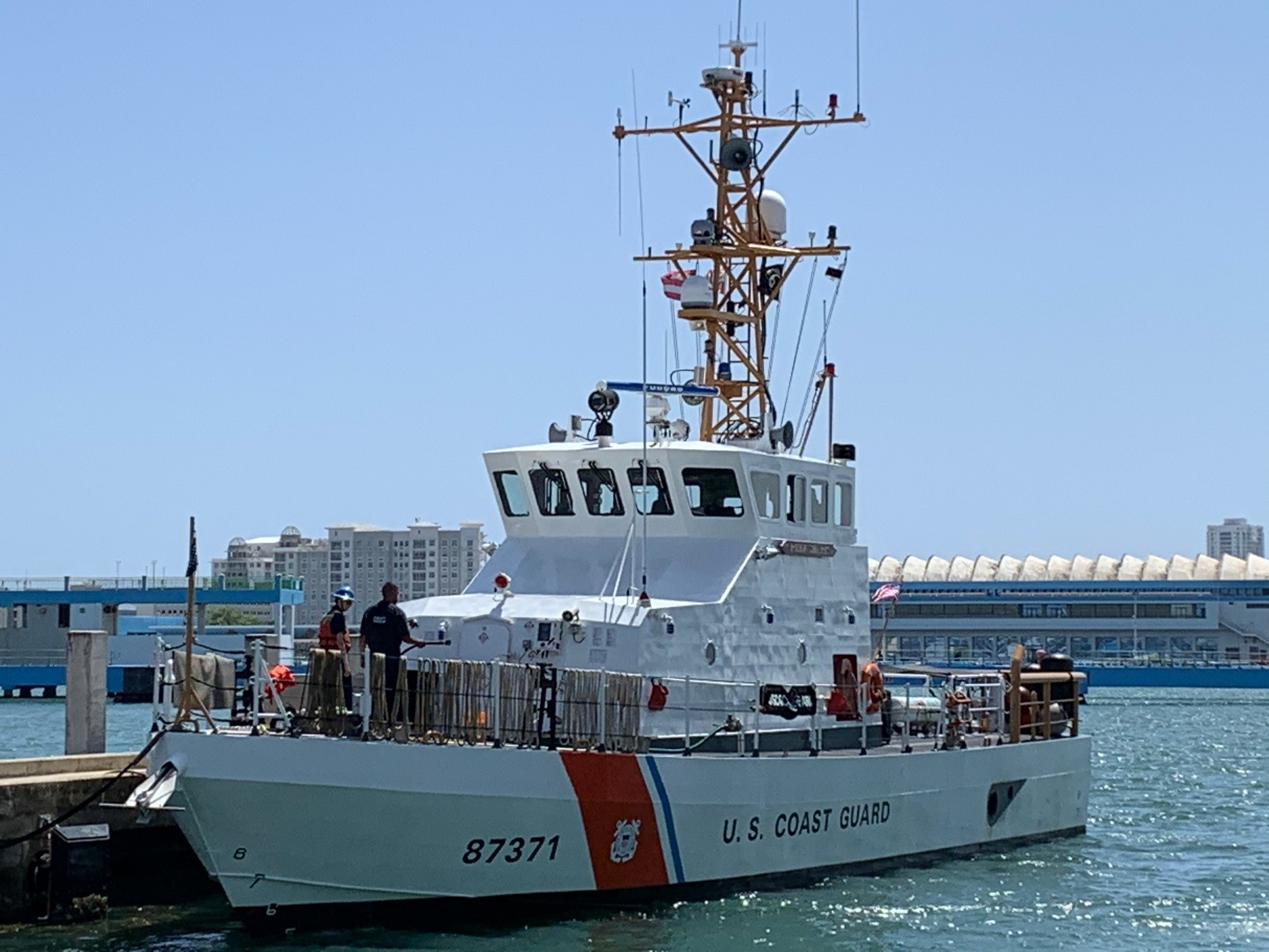
- USCGC Reef Shark

History

United States
- Name: Reef Shark
- Builder: Bollinger Shipyards, Lockport, Louisiana
- Commissioned: 23 March 2009
- Home port: Juneau, Alaska
- Identification: MMSI number: 369493460; Callsign: NTBD
- Status: in active service
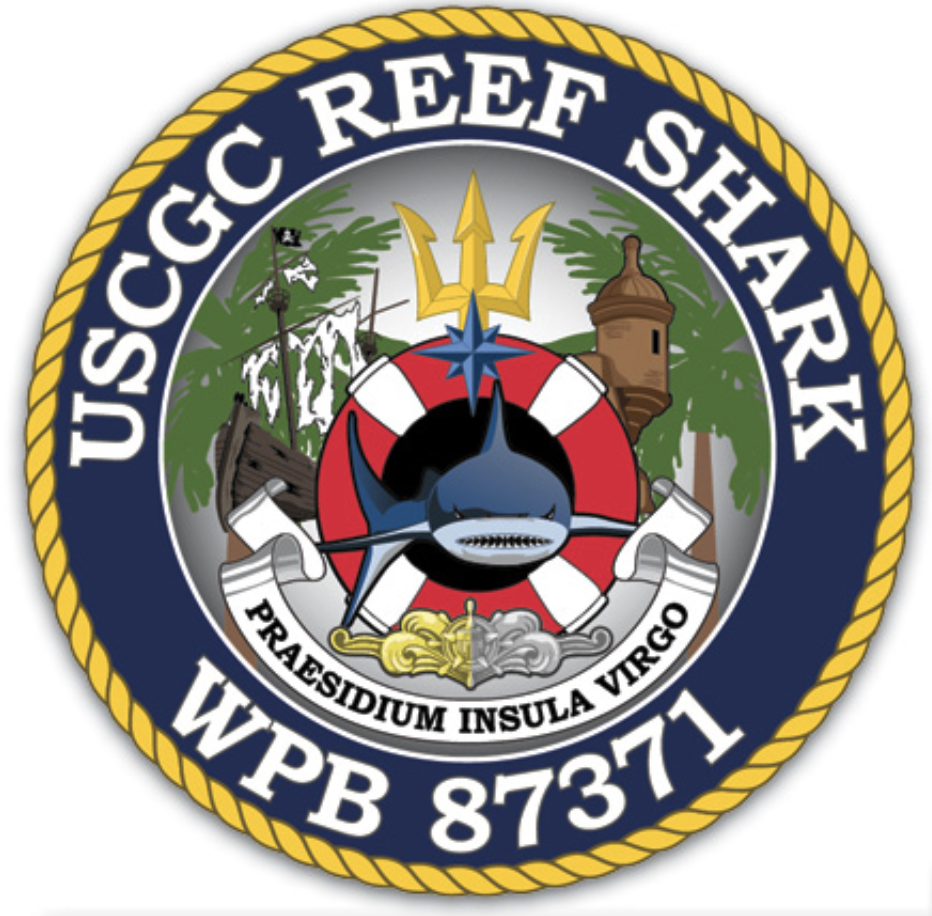
- Badge

General characteristics
- Class & type: Marine Protector-class coastal patrol boat
- Displacement: 91 long tons (92 t)
- Length: 87 ft 0 in (26.5 m)
- Beam: 19 ft 5 in (5.9 m)
- Draft: 5 ft 7 in (1.7 m)
- Propulsion: 2 x MTU diesels
- Speed: 25 knots (46 km/h; 29 mph)
- Range: 900 nmi (1,700 km; 1,000 mi)
- Endurance: 3 days
- Complement: 10
- Armament: 2 × .50-caliber M2 Browning machine guns

USCGC Reef Shark (WPB-87371) is the 69th Marine Protector-class coastal patrol boat to be built. Her home port is Juneau, Alaska, where she is moored in Auke Bay.

== Construction and characteristics ==
Reef Shark is 87 feet (27 m) long, with a beam of 19.4 feet (5.9 m), and a displacement of 91 tons at full load. Her stern encloses a ramp which allows her to launch her cutter boat in more difficult sea conditions and with fewer people than conventional deck crane systems. Her ship's boat is a Zodiac Hurricane 558 10J rigid inflatable which is 17.7 feet (5.4 m) long. The RIB is propelled by a Diesel engine, which allows her to be refueled from Reef Shark's tanks.

Reef Shark is powered by two eight-cylinder MTU diesel engines, each of which delivers 1,429 horsepower (1,066 kW). These, in turn, drive two five-bladed fixed-pitch propellers. Her maximum speed is better than 25 knots (46 km/h; 29 mph). Her unrefueled range is 900 miles and her at-sea endurance is three days.

She can carry a crew of eleven, and her staterooms accommodate any gender mix of sailors.

Reef Shark was commissioned at a ceremony at San Juan, Puerto Rico on 23 March 2009. Delegate to Congress, Donna M. Christensen, sponsored the vessel and gave the keynote speech at the ceremony.

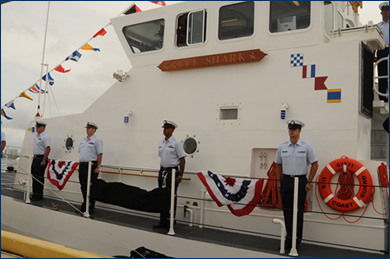
Reef Shark on her commissioning day, 23 March 2009

== Service history ==
Reef Shark was initially assigned to Coast Guard Base San Juan, Puerto Rico. One of Reef Shark's primary missions in San Juan was drug interdiction in the Caribbean. In April 2009, on one of her first missions after her commissioning, she intercepted a sailboat off the Virgin Islands which had 550 pounds (250 kg) of cocaine on board in a hidden compartment. On 12 October 2012 she participated in the seizure of 1,400 lb (640 kg) of cocaine off Puerto Rico. In March 2014 she seized 533 lb (242 kg) of cocaine worth $5.7 million. She also took part in numerous search and rescue missions in the waters around Puerto Rico and the U.S. Virgin Islands. The ship was also responsible for repatriating migrants seeking to reach the United States by sea.

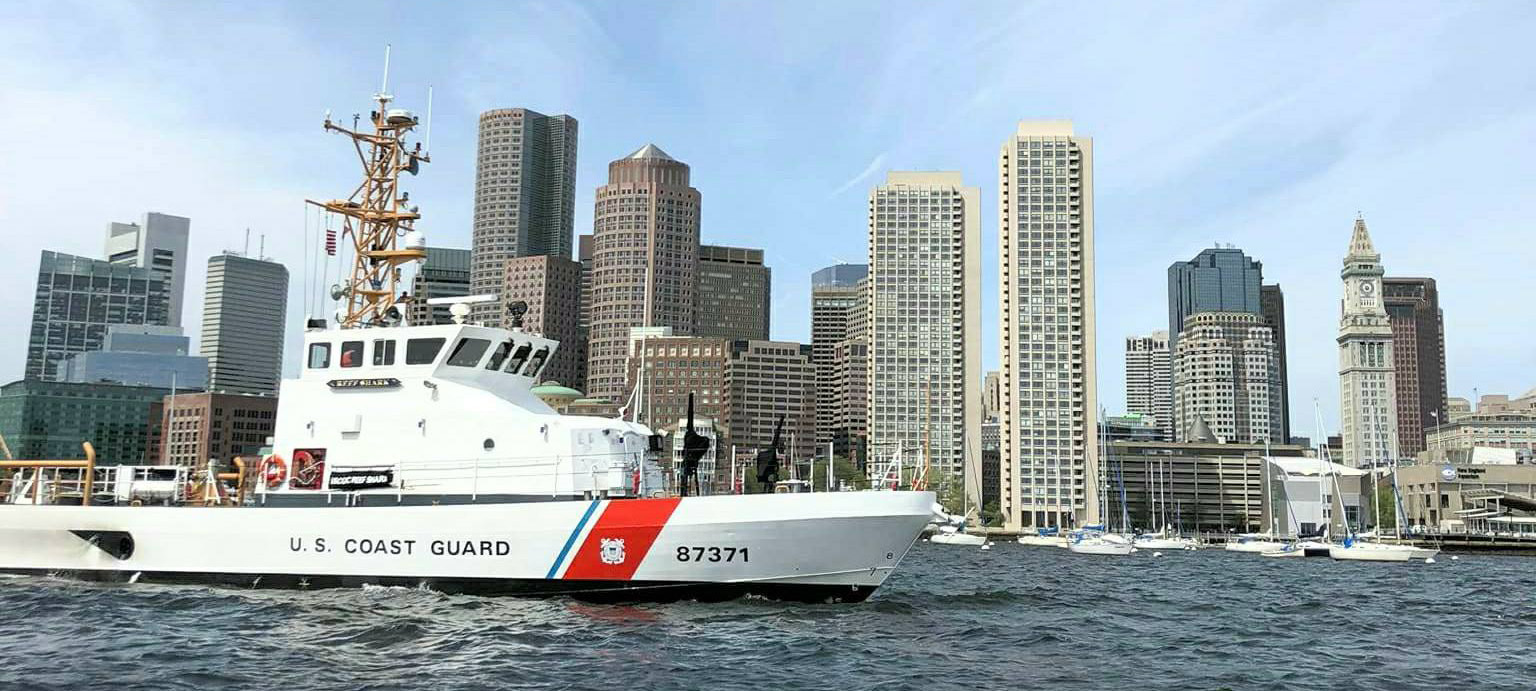
Reef Shark patrolling Boston Harbor in 2018

She was reassigned to Boston. On 21 February 2018, Reef Shark took the tug Captain Mackintire under tow near Portsmouth, New Hampshire. The 74-year old vessel had collided with the tug that had been towing it and was in sinking condition. By early the nest morning the crew cut the tow line and Captain Mackintire sank.

In March 2021, based once again in San Juan, Reef Shark participated in the seizure of $6.6 million of cocaine on a small boat transiting Mona Passage.

Reef Shark also aided in the management of sea-going migrants in the Caribbean. In June 2020, she took 13 migrants off a makeshift boat near Puerto Rico.

On 8 April 2022 Reef Shark's home port was officially changed from San Juan to Juneau. She replaced USCGC Liberty there. She transited the Panama Canal on her way to Alaska on 5 May 2022 and reached her new moorage in Auke Bay on 4 June 2022.

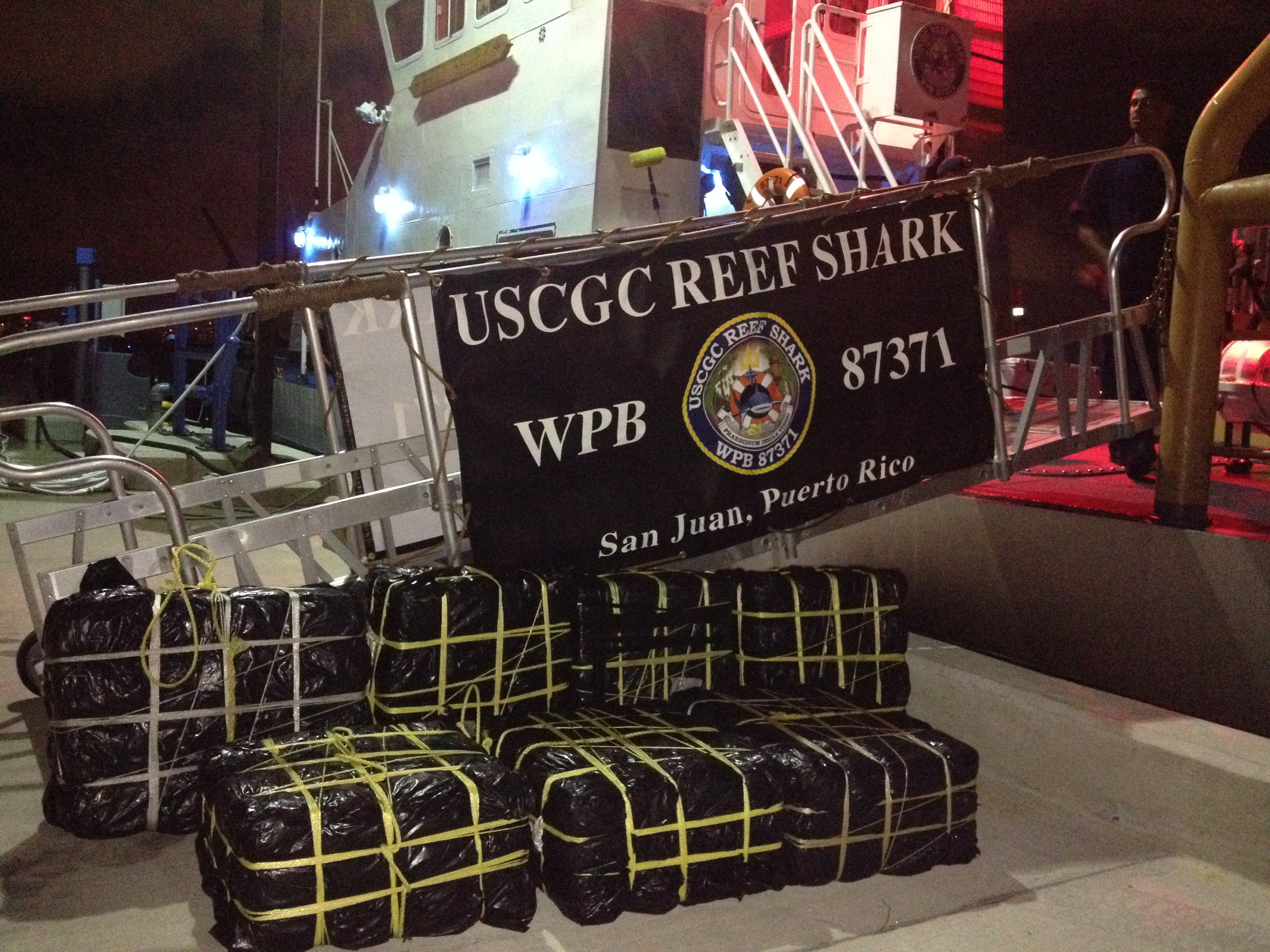
533 pounds of cocaine seized by Reef Shark off Vieques in March 2014
