= Anchorage Fire Department =

Fire department in Alaska, US

- AFD Logo

- AFD Patch

Operational area
- Country: United States
- State: Alaska
- City: Anchorage
- Coordinates: 61°13′06″N 149°52′56″W

Agency overview
- Established: 1915
- Annual calls: 36,270 (2017)
- Employees: 392 (2022)
- Annual budget: $104,173,605 2022)
- Staffing: Career
- Fire chief: Douglas Schrage
- IAFF: 1264

Facilities and equipment
- Battalions: 3
- Stations: 13
- Engines: 14
- Trucks: 2
- Tillers: 1
- Platforms: 2
- Rescues: 3
- Ambulances: 13
- Tenders: 5
- HAZMAT: 1
- USAR: 1
- Wildland: 1
- Rescue boats: 2

Website
- Official website
- IAFF website

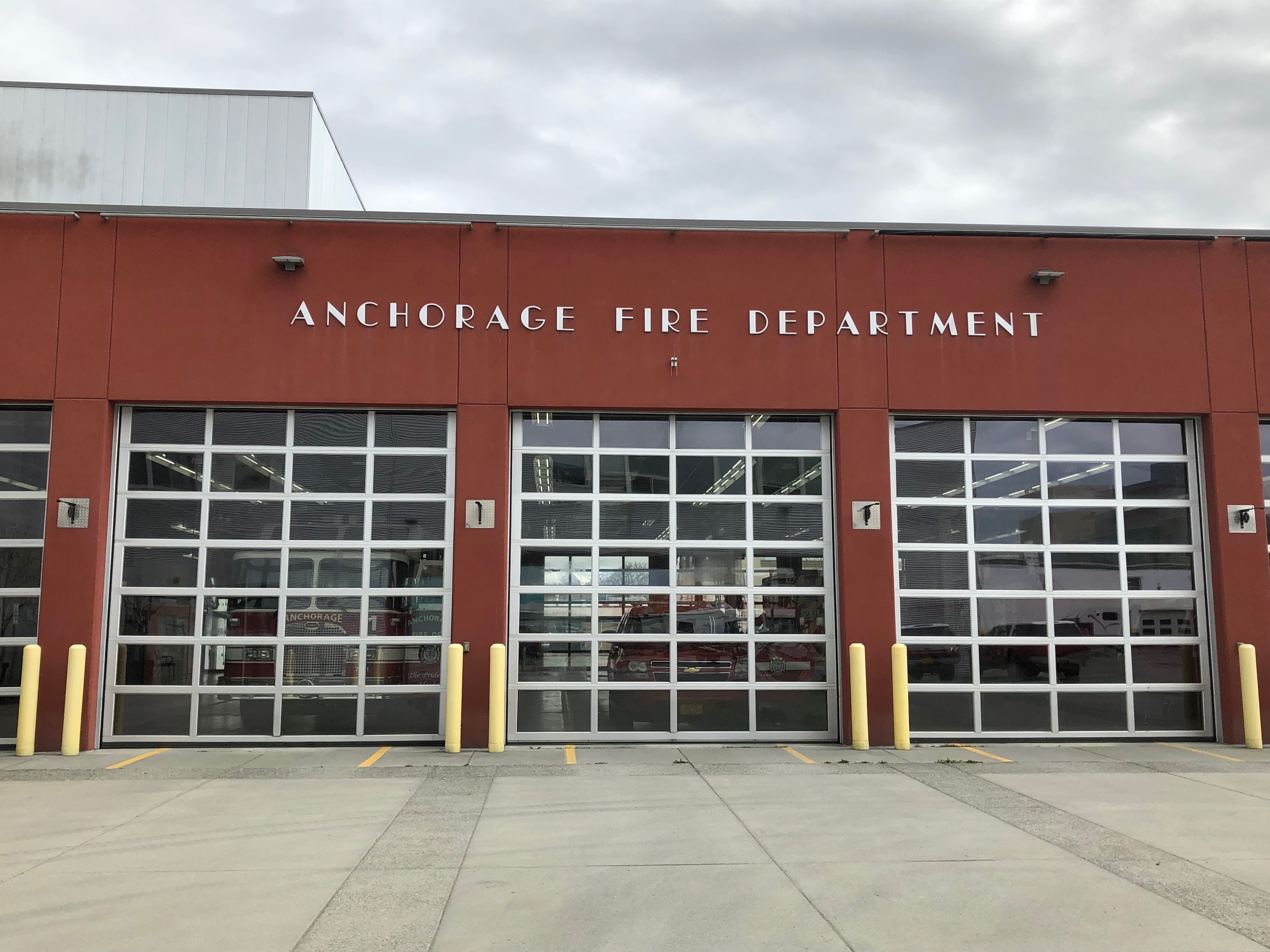
Anchorage Fire Department garage entrance

The Anchorage Fire Department (AFD) provides fire protection and emergency medical services to the city of Anchorage, Alaska. Areas that are served by department include the incorporated areas of downtown Anchorage, Bird, Bootleggers Cove, Eagle River, Fairview, Indian, Mountain View, Muldoon, and Spenard, among others. AFD is assisted by two volunteer fire departments operating in the outlying areas of the Anchorage Municipality.

== History ==
The Anchorage Fire Department was founded in 1915. By 1951, AFD had grown to 50 fire fighters, and saw the beginning of Anchorage's first ambulance service. In 1967, the various fire companies unified as the Greater Anchorage Area Borough Fire Department. In 1975, the City of Anchorage and the Greater Anchorage Borough unified, becoming the Municipality of Anchorage.

As of 2015, the AFD has a goal of maintaining 315 fire fighters and paramedics on active duty.

In 2024, AFD is led by Chief Doug Schrage with Deputy Chief Eric Scheunenmann and Assistant Chiefs Brian Partch and Ben Lewis. Brian Dean is the Fire Marshal.

Anchorage has a history of inclusive female Leadership: Chief Jodie Hettrick served as Chief of the Anchorage Fire Department, Virginia McMichael served as Chief of Chugiak Volunteer Fire and Rescue and Judie Coletta and Michelle Weston have served as chiefs of Girdwood Fire Rescue. Bridget Bushue and Michelle Weston previously served as AFD Deputy Chiefs. Cleo Hill and Bridget Bushue both filled command roles as Fire Marshals.

== Stations and apparatus ==
| Fire Station Number | Neighborhood | Engine Company | Truck Company | EMS Medic Unit | Special Unit | Battalion Chief Units |
|---|---|---|---|---|---|---|
| 1 | Downtown | Engine 1 Engine 2 | Truck 1 | Medic 1 Medic 81 (BLS) Medic 82 (BLS) | HazMat 1, ALS 1 (fly car) | Battalion Chief 1 |
| 3 | Mountain View | Engine 3 | Truck 3 | Medic 3 | Rescue 3 (USAR) | |
| 4 | Tudor | Engine 4 | | Medic 4 Medic 84 (BLS) | Rescue 4 (Heavy Rescue), Dive 4 (Water Rescue), ALS 4 (fly car) | |
| 5 | Spenard | Engine 5 | Truck 5 | Medic 5 | | |
| 6 | Muldoon | Engine 6 | | Medic 6 | | |
| 7 | Jewel Lake | Engine 7 | | Medic 7 | | |
| 8 | O'Malley | Engine 8 | | | Tender 8 | |
| 9 | Dearmoun | Engine 9 | | Medic 9 | Tender 9, Rescue 9 (Frontcountry Rescue) | |
| 10 | Rabbit Creek | Engine 10 | | | Tender 10 | |
| 11 | Eagle River | Engine 11 | | Medic 11 | Squad 11, Tender 11, Rescue 11 (Swiftwater Rescue) | |
| 12 | Dimond | Engine 12 | Truck 12 | Medic 12 | Safety 1 | Battalion Chief 2 |
| 14 | Tudor Baxter | Engine 14 | | Medic 814 (BLS) | Tender 14, Rehab 14 | Battalion Chief 3 |
| 15 | Southport | Engine 15 | | | | |

== Chugiak and Girdwood Fire Service Areas ==
Chugiak and Girdwood fire departments provide fire, rescue and EMS services to the north and south of the Anchorage Fire Service Area. In the north, Chugiak Volunteer Fire & Rescue Company, Inc. operates five stations and serves an area from the North Eagle River overpass on the Glenn Highway to the Municipal boundary at the Knik River under the leadership of Chief Clifton Dalton and two assistant chiefs. In the south, Girdwood Fire Rescue operates one station and serves the Girdwood community and Turnagain Arm. Girdwood responds to vehicle accidents in the Seward Highway Safety Corridor from Indian to Mile 60 in the Kenai Peninsula Borough under the leadership of Chief Michelle Weston and Deputy Chief Manch Garhart. Both departments provide 24/7/365 advanced life support coverage along with vehicle extrication, water rescue, mud rescue, wildland initial attack and backcountry rescue. Girdwood is 45–60 miles from the closest hospital, and Girdwood Fire is the only medical provider in the community from 6pm-9am weekdays and for 24hr/day on weekends. Girdwood can be isolated from Anchorage and travel south to the Kenai Peninsula by severe weather (white out conditions), avalanches and rockfall and is in an earthquake and tsunami zone. Both departments do a significant amount of fundraising for specialized rescue equipment and training.

| Fire Station Number | Neighborhood | Engine Companies | Medic Units | Special Units |
|---|---|---|---|---|
| 31 | Chugiak | Engine 31 | Medic 31 | Tender 31, Brush 31, Utility 31, ALS 31 (24-hour ALS fly car), Captain 1, 2, 3, or 4 (24-hour duty officer) |
| 32 | Birchwood | Tender 32 | | Brush 34, Utility 33, Utility 32 (Flatbed) |
| 33 | Peters Creek | Engine 33 | Medic 33 | Rescue 33, Tender 33 |
| 34 | Birchwood Airport | | | off-season storage for snowmachines (summer) , Boat 31 (winter) |
| 35 | North Eagle River | Engine 35 | Medic 35 | Tender 35, Brush 35, Boat 31 (summer) or snowmachines (winter), Chief 31, Chief 32, Chief 33 Utility 34, ATV 31 |
| 41 | Girdwood | Engine 41 | Medic 41, Medic 42 | Rescue 41, Rescue 42, Brush 41, Tender 41, Tender 42, Tender 43, Utility 41, Chief 41, Chief 42, Boat 41, UAS, snowmachines (x2), Side-by-side (x2) Unimog |

== Gallery ==
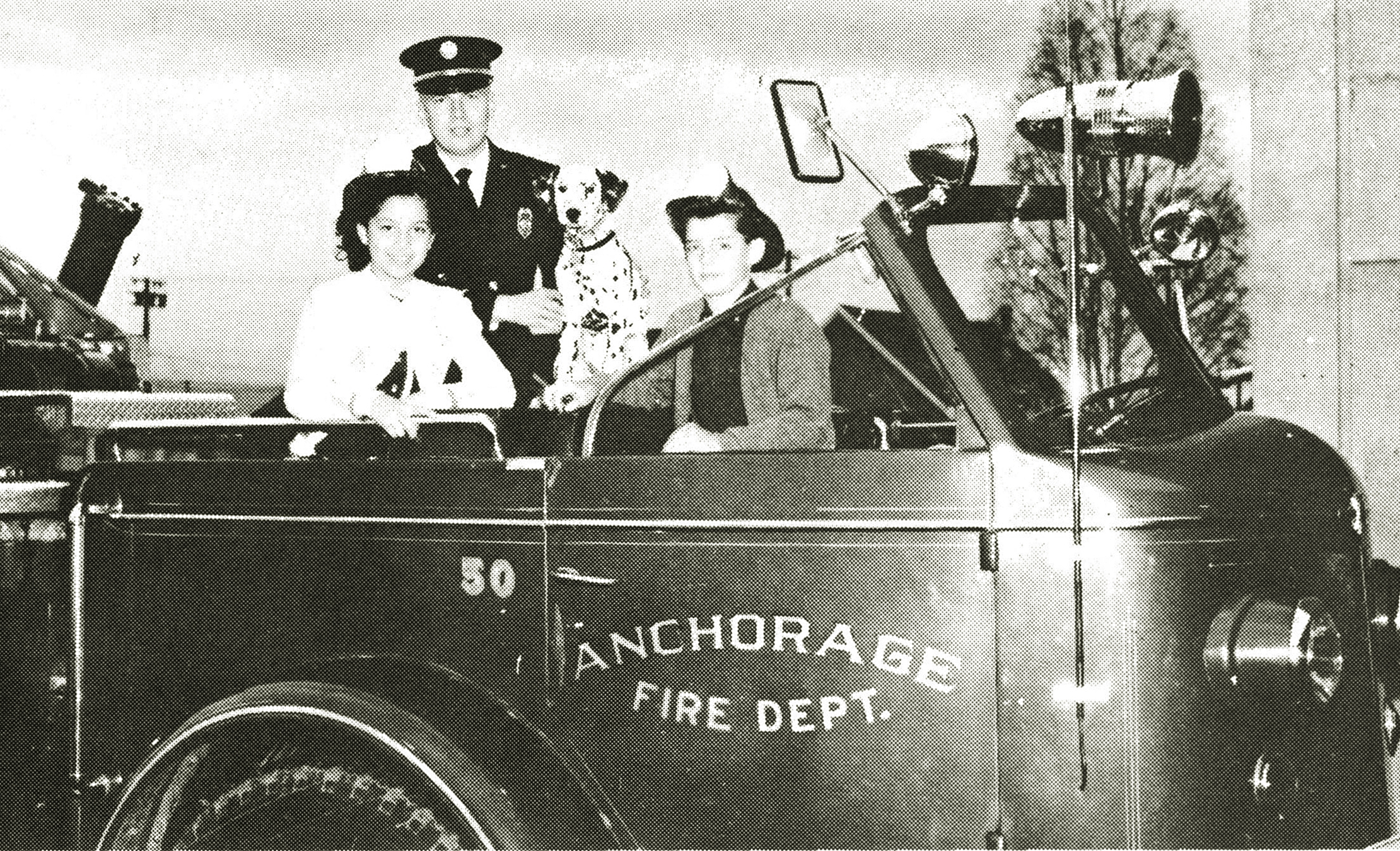
Lt. Livingston of AFD poses with mascot Sparky, a dalmatian, and "Fire Prevention King and Queen" schoolchildren, 1963

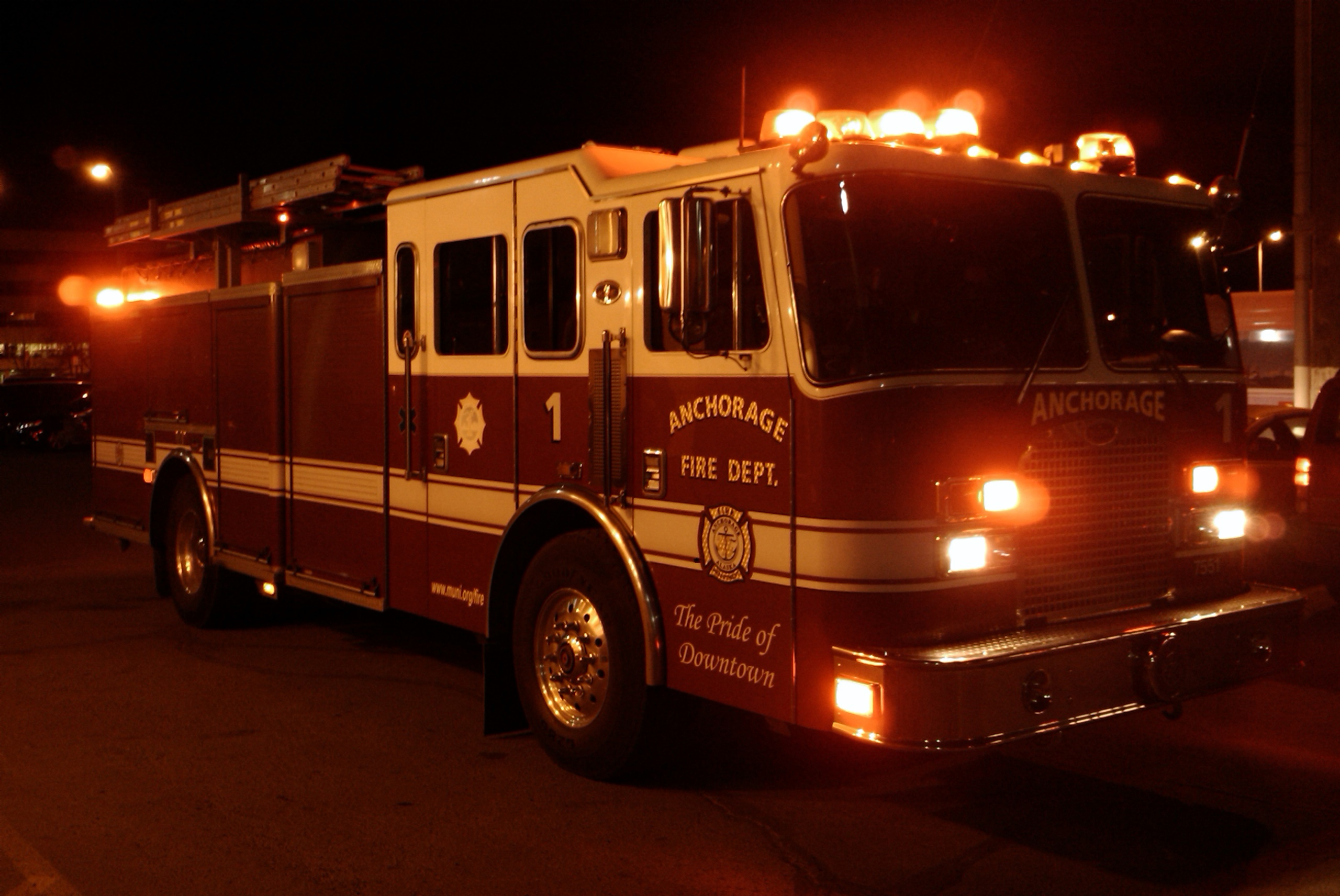
Anchorage Fire Department Engine 1 at its downtown station
