= Settle Group =

Settle Group (formerly known as Auka) is a Norwegian, VC-backed financial technology company. Its PSD2 compliant technology platform enables banks to issue white label mobile payments products to their private and merchant customers.

Based in Oslo, in 2017 the company employed 26 people under CEO Daniel Döderlein.

== History ==
Founded in 2010, Settle Group was originally called mCASH and was the first mobile payments platform to launch in Norway. Since then, Norway and the Nordics have seen some of the highest rates of mobile payment adoption according to data from Visa. It received $6.87m in Series A funding round led by Northzone Ventures - which has also invested in Spotify, Klarna and iZettle - and including Entree Capital, an investor in Deliveroo.

In 2016, under the corporate name Auka, the company was named as the fastest-growing fintech company by Deloitte Fast 500 EMEA and was cited as one of the 16 hottest Nordic fintech startups by Business Insider. It was named European Mobile Payments Platform of the Year 2017 by CFI magazine, and was included in the European Fintech Awards Top 100 for 2017.

In February 2014, the company launched its mobile payment platform in the Norwegian market also under the name mCASH. In October 2015, Sparebank1 bought the Norwegian mCASH service, retaining the name, while the company originally known as mCASH rebranded as Auka. In early 2017, the mCASH mobile payment service was integrated into Vipps, a payment platform developed by DNB ASA.

After rebranding, Auka expanded its focus to include PSD2-compliant solutions, such as API-hosting, for banks in addition to mobile payment services, as well as launching its services in the wider European market.

The company was subsequently rebranded once more, changing its name from Auka to Settle Group.

== Technology ==
Auka's white-label products are designed to support banks' customer acquisition and revenue generation efforts, and delivered using the Software-as-a-Service (SaaS) model. Auka was the first licensed financial services company to run entirely in the Google Cloud Platform

Auka's FSA-compliant core platform provides an API catalogue for banks needing to meet PSD2 regulations. These regulations, which went into full effect on 14 September 2019, require financial institutions operating in these markets to expose compliant, open APIs.

Auka’s mobile payments platform has been integrated by 17 Scandinavian banks. Auka specialises in mobile payment services that allow users to pay with their smartphone using their preferred source of funding in any payment scenario, agnostic to either the mobile network operator or operating system. Its Peer-to-Peer (P2P) mobile payments platform can be configured to allow individuals to make fast, personal payments using a number of different identifiers including mobile phone numbers, bank account numbers, card numbers or social media profiles. Auka’s Peer-to-Merchant (P2M) mobile payments platform enables retailers and SMEs to offer customers the option to pay for goods using their mobile phone.
