= Tolch Rock =

Highest point
- Elevation: 194 ft (59 m)
- Coordinates: 58°24′54″N 134°36′10″W

Geography
- Location: Juneau, Alaska, United States
- Parent range: Juneau Icefield / Boundary Ranges
- Topo map: USGS Juneau B-2

Tolch Rock is in the City and Borough of Juneau, Alaska, United States. It is located 0.5 miles (0.8 km) west of Mendenhall Lake and 10 miles (16 km) northwest of the city of Juneau.

Originally known as "Big Rock" it was named for W. T. Tolch in 1923, who brought the Boy Scouts of America to Juneau. Today the rock is at the end of a trail of the same name; the trail is managed by the United States Forest Service. A rededication occurred in 2000, and the rock is also the site of a commemorative plaque.

Tolch Rock is a large boulder, composed of granite and described as rectangular and "erratic", with young trees growing on its surface. An active nest of northern goshawk was noted on the rock in 1999, and adults at the site were radiotagged; no activity was noted in 2000 or 2001.
