= Auke Lake =

Lake in the state of Alaska, United States

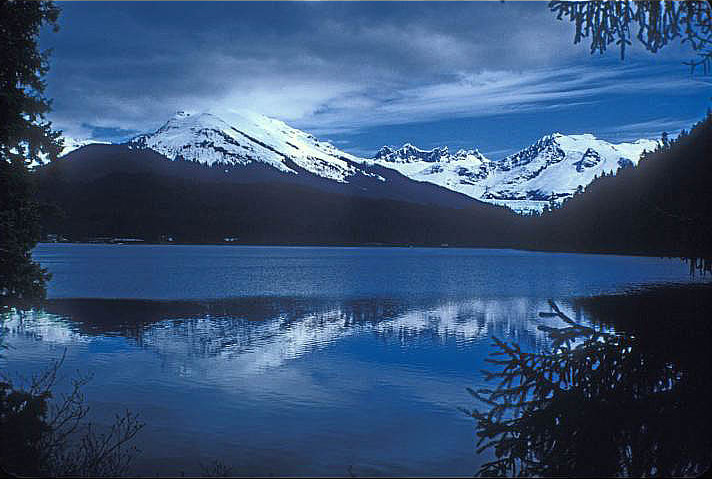
- Auke Lake

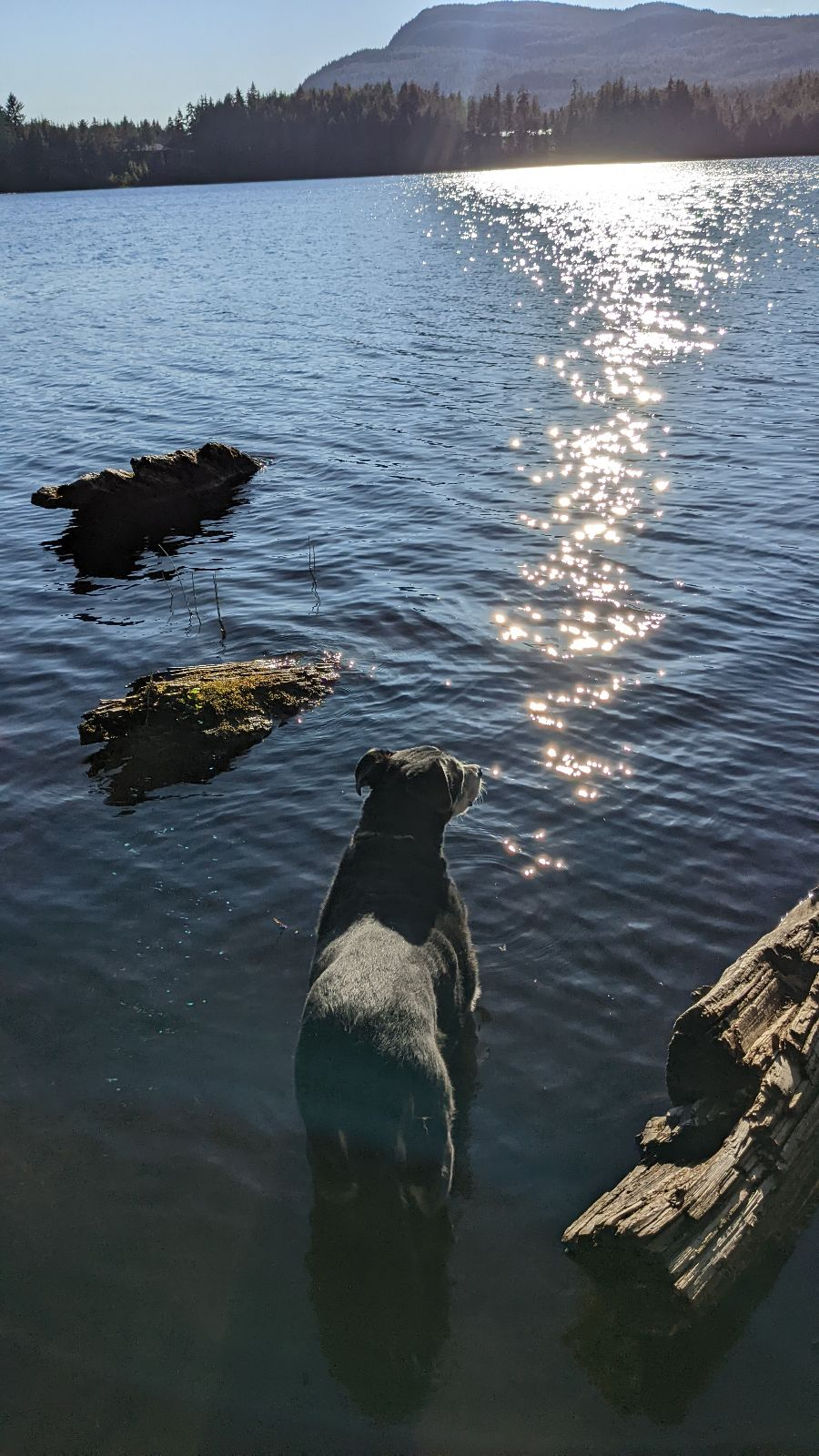
- Darwin clearing woody debris from Darwin's beach
- Location: Juneau, Alaska
- Coordinates: 58°23′15″N 134°37′51″W
- Surface area: 160 acres (0.65 km^{2})

Auke Lake (Áak'w or Yax̱te in Tlingit, literally 'lake lake') is a 160-acre (0.65 km^{2}) lake located in Auke Bay in Juneau, Alaska.

Auke Lake (surface area ≈ 0.67 km²; max depth ≈ 35 m) is fed primarily by two named inlet streams—Lake Creek, which drains a 648 ha watershed and deposits clear, gravel‑bed flow along the north shore alluvial fan, and Little Lake Creek (sometimes called Lake Two Creek), which enters on the west side—along with several smaller wetland tributaries. The lake sits at an elevation of roughly 19 m and drains through a single outlet, Auke Creek, which drops approximately 19 m over its 0.5 km course before entering saltwater at Auke Bay. A permanent weir installed about 400 m downstream of the lake monitors the timing and magnitude of fish migrations, while a network of gauge stations and thermographs records water levels and temperature year‑round. Ice‑out typically occurs in mid‑April, after which fry migrate downstream from May through June and adult salmonids ascend from July into October.

Auke Lake supports a rich assemblage of anadromous and resident salmonids. Sockeye salmon account for the vast majority of the lake’s spawning run: roughly 87 % of adults spawn in Lake Creek, about 9 % in Little Lake Creek, with the remainder utilizing minor tributaries or shoreline gravels. Pink salmon exhibit both even‑ and odd‑year cycles and spawn primarily in the lower reaches of Auke Creek and its intertidal flats, while coho and chum also ascend the outlet and occasionally use inlet habitat for spawning. Sea‑run cutthroat trout and Dolly Varden Char migrate into both inlet creeks and the lake itself for spawning and rearing, and steelhead trout make annual returns to Auke Creek where they are counted and PIT‑tagged for movement studies. This hydrologic and biological connectivity—anchored by comprehensive weir counts and habitat protection in the tributary corridors—has made the Auke Lake basin a valuable long‑term monitoring site for understanding the responses of salmonid populations to climatic and land‑use changes.

There has always been a spartan trail that wrapped around the eastern side of the lake that wound through some of the largest Sitka spruces in Juneau. In 2009, the Auke Lake Trail underwent a comprehensive redesign led by the University of Alaska Southeast in partnership with the City and Borough of Juneau Parks & Recreation and Trail Mix, Inc. This collaborative fundraising campaign transformed the original lakeshore path into a durable, all-weather trail complete with interpretive stations, reinforced surfacing, and a rebuilt pedestrian footbridge across the Auke Creek lagoon connecting directly to the UAS campus.

A distinctive feature of the route is Darwin’s Beach, a small cove located between the two floating platforms on the eastern shore. Here, a series of stone steps descend to the water’s edge. According to local accounts, this spot was beloved by Darwin, a legendary local husky/lab mix. Darwin was struck by a car at the original trailhead during 2009 construction and, despite an initial prognosis that he would not walk again, continued to roam the Auke Lake Trail for nearly seventeen years, frequently spending sunny afternoons clearing wood debris from the water and greeting passerbys.

The views of Mt. McGinnis and the Towers from the Glacier Hwy side of Auke Lake are one of the most photographed in Juneau and Alaska. Other claims to fame include the flamingo house and the Auke Lake Curling Club.
