= University of Alaska Southeast =

Public university in Juneau, Alaska

- Former names: University of Alaska Juneau (1972-1987); Ketchikan Community College (1962-1987); Islands Community College (1954-1987)
- Motto: Ad summum (Latin)
- Motto in English: "To the top"
- Type: Public university
- Established: 1972; 54 years ago
- Parent institution: University of Alaska
- Accreditation: NWCCU
- Academic affiliations: Space-grant
- Endowment: $375 million (system-wide) (2021)
- Chancellor: Aparna D. Palmer
- Students: 2,279 (Fall 2024)
- Location: Juneau, Alaska, United States; 58°23′06″N 134°38′19″W
- Campus: 198 acres (0.80 km^{2}); Remote Town
- Other campuses: Ketchikan; Sitka
- Newspaper: Whalesong
- Colors: Blue; White
- Nickname: Humpback Whales
- Mascot: Spike
- Website: uas.alaska.edu
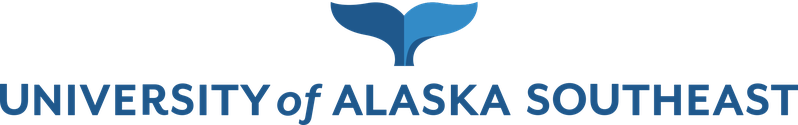

Academic rankings

Regional
- U.S. News & World Report: 105-115

The University of Alaska Southeast (UA Southeast, Alaska Southeast, or UAS) is a public university with its main campus in Juneau, Alaska, United States, and extended campuses in Sitka and Ketchikan.

Part of the University of Alaska System, it was established on July 1, 1987, with the restructuring and consolidation of the former University of Alaska Juneau, Ketchikan Community College, and Islands Community College (Sitka). The university is accredited by the Northwest Commission on Colleges and Universities.

== Campuses ==
University of Alaska Southeast (Alaska)
Location of University of Alaska Southeast campuses. Red dots represent community colleges.

=== Juneau ===
The University of Alaska Southeast's main campus is located in Juneau. The majority of the campus lies between Auke Bay and Auke Lake. The campus consists of classrooms, studios, teaching and research labs, the Anderson Science building (North Pacific Marine Lab), the Áakʼw Tá Hít environmental science building, the William A. Egan Library, housing, the Student Recreation Center (Charles Gamble Jr.-Donald Sperl Joint Use Facility), and office and administrative spaces. UAS also has a Technical Education Center, located in downtown Juneau, which consists of technical, construction and mechanical labs, a mine simulator, and classroom and office space. The Juneau campus offers Occupational Endorsements, Certificates, Associate, Baccalaureate, and Graduate degrees.

=== Sitka ===
The Sitka campus was founded as Sitka Community College in 1962. The campus awards Occupational Endorsements in administrative office support, network support technician, web development, network administration, healthcare information technology, residential and light construction, law enforcement, and welding; Certificates in computer information and office systems, accounting technician, healthcare privacy and security, small business management, fisheries technology, pre-nursing and pre-radiologic technician qualifications, and health information management coding specialist; and associate degrees in health information management, general education, nursing (in partnership with the University of Alaska Anchorage), fisheries technology, apprenticeship technology, and health sciences.

=== Ketchikan ===
The Ketchikan campus is the oldest campus in Southeast Alaska, and was originally established as Ketchikan Community College in 1954. Now a branch campus of the University of Alaska Southeast (UAS), the Ketchikan campus has online degree offerings including the only interdisciplinary Bachelor of Liberal Arts and Bachelor of Arts, Social Science. Students can achieve degrees in education, business, public administration, health care including nursing, career education, social sciences, and liberal arts through local and online programs.

The Ketchikan campus also houses the Ketchikan Regional Maritime and Career Center, which is the only regional provider of U.S. Coast Guard-approved maritime industry training courses and programs. UAS Ketchikan is the only campus in the State of Alaska to offer an Associate of Applied Science in Marine Transportation. In addition to training mariners, the campus offers a U.S. Coast Guard-approved marine oiler (Qualified Member of the Engine Department) program, welding course work and a State of Alaska approved Certified Nurse Aide program.

UAS Ketchikan works closely with the Vigor Alaska Shipyard in Ketchikan and offers training opportunities for both shipyard incumbent workers and residents who want to work for Vigor Alaska. The campus also works closely with the Alaska Marine Highway System, Southeast Alaska Pilots' Association and other maritime and maritime-related business and organization to meet the training needs of Southeast Alaska's employers.

== Academics ==
Undergraduate demographics as of Fall 2023
Race and ethnicity	Total
White	54%
Two or more races	14%
American Indian/Alaska Native	11%
Hispanic	9%
Asian	6%
Unknown	3%
Black	1%
International student	1%
Economic diversity
Low-income (Note: The percentage of students who received an income-based federal Pell grant intended for low-income students.)	26%
Affluent (Note: The percentage of students who are a part of the American middle class at the bare minimum.)	74%

=== Schools ===
UAS has three academic schools:

- the School of Arts and Sciences
- the School of Career Education
- the School of Education

== Research partnerships ==
UAS supports a wide array of collaborative research activities, including partnerships with the:

- Alaska Coastal Rainforest Center
- Alaska Experimental Program to Stimulate Competitive Research (EPSCoR)
- Alaska Climate Science Center
- Pacific Northwest Cooperative Ecosystem Studies Unit
- Alaska Cooperative Ecosystem Studies Unit
- UAS Spatial Ecosystem Analysis Lab (SEALAB)
- University of Alaska Fairbanks School of Fisheries and Ocean Sciences
- University of the Arctic

== Libraries ==
Juneau

- William A. Egan Library
- The William A. Egan Library develops physical and electronic collections in support of the programs and services provided by the University of Alaska Southeast to its diverse student body, the UAS community, and the residents of Juneau. The library has an extensive collection of Pacific Northwest Coastal Art.

Sitka

- Sitka students, faculty and staff receive library services from the UAS Egan Library in Juneau. Computer labs on campus facilitate access to online resources and reference assistance.

Ketchikan

- The Ketchikan Campus Library is located on the second floor of the A.H. Ziegler Building at the upper campus on Seventh Avenue. The library contains approximately 36,000 volumes, 120 periodicals in print, and a collection of federal government documents. The library is a member of the First City Libraries Consortium .

== Recreation center ==
The Student Recreation Center (Charles Gamble Jr.-Donald Sperl Joint Use Facility) is a shared facility with the Alaska Army National Guard (AANG). This facility includes basketball and volleyball courts, a suspended running/walking track, a thirty-foot climbing wall, a weight training room, and a dance and cardio studio. The Student Recreation Center opened in September 2005 and replaced the older Student Activities Center.

== Athletics ==
UAS has an array of intramural sports, activities, physical education courses and an Outdoor Studies Program. The Outdoor Studies Program provides students with training and leadership in a variety of popular outdoor activities including backcountry skiing, ice and rock climbing, sea kayaking and mountaineering. UAS did have an intercollegiate sports program that was shut down along with Sheldon Jackson College and Alaska Pacific University in 1990.

In the 1980s, Clair Markey created an NAIA basketball program at the University of Alaska Southeast. He turned the men's team into one of the nation's highest scoring teams. In only the third year of the Whales basketball program, the team made it to the first round of post-season play-off action.

== Publications ==
The student news publication of UAS is Whalesong. Whalesong was founded in 1981 and has a circulation of 1,000. In 2023, Whalesong announced its switch from physical newspapers to a news podcast. The student edited literary and arts journal is Tidal Echoes. An academic journal titled Summit is published annually through the student Writing Center.
