= Bartlett Regional Hospital =

Coordinates: 58°19′45″N 134°27′54″W

- City and Borough of Juneau
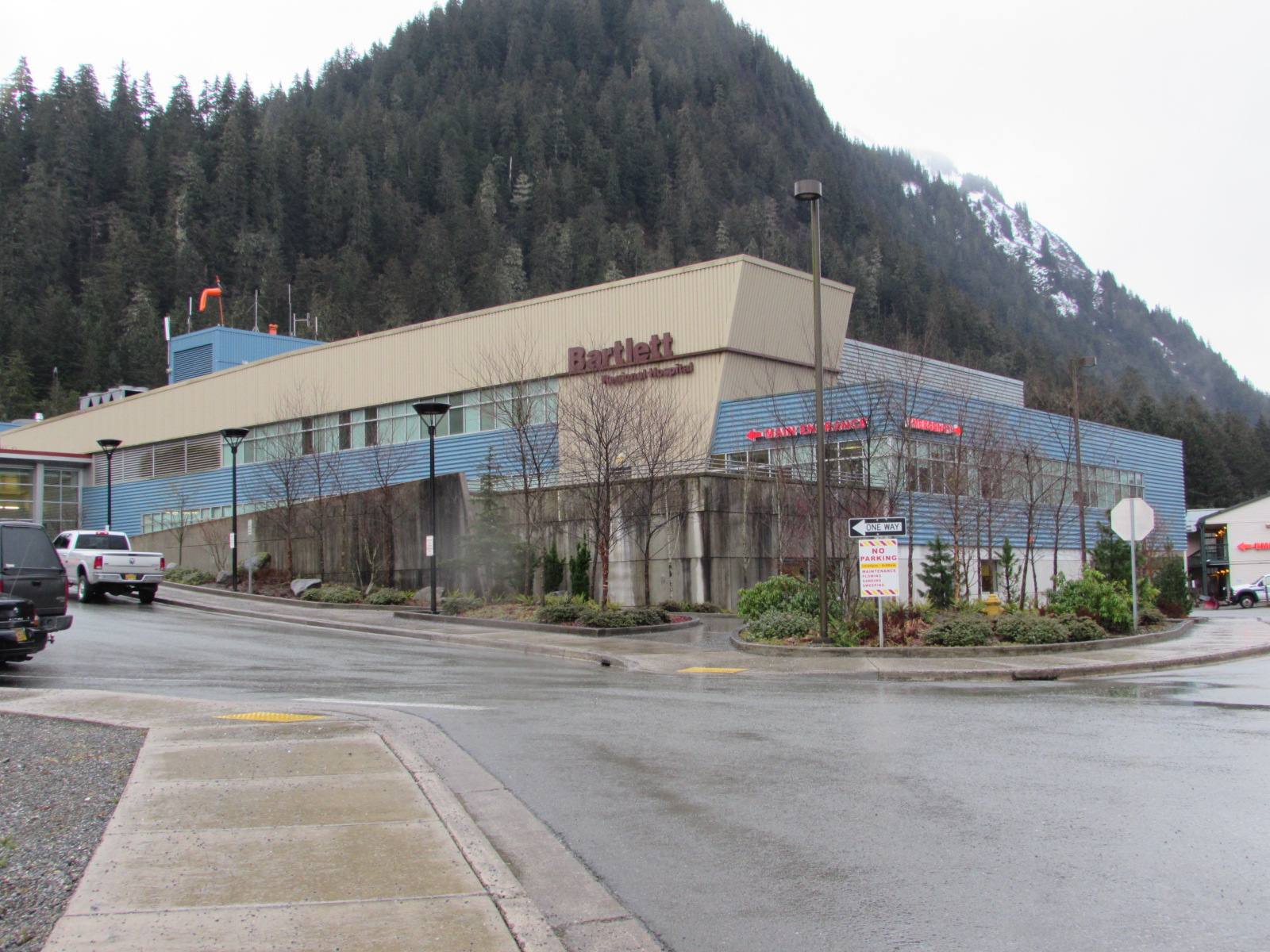
- Bartlett Regional Hospital, January 2016

Geography
- Location: Juneau, Alaska, United States

Services
- Emergency department: Yes, Level IV Trauma Center
- Beds: 45

History
- Founded: 1886

Links
- Website: www.bartletthospital.org

Bartlett Regional Hospital (BRH) is a hospital serving Juneau, Alaska, the capital city of Alaska and the largest city in Southeast Alaska. The hospital is owned by the City and Borough of Juneau. BRH is the only hospital in Juneau, and provides the only emergency department in the city.

Bartlett Regional Hospital has 57 inpatient beds and 61 residential beds in Wildflower Court, the adjacent long-term care facility the hospital acquired in July 2023. The hospital is located at 3260 Hospital Drive, in the Twin Lakes area of Juneau, adjacent to Egan Drive.

== History ==
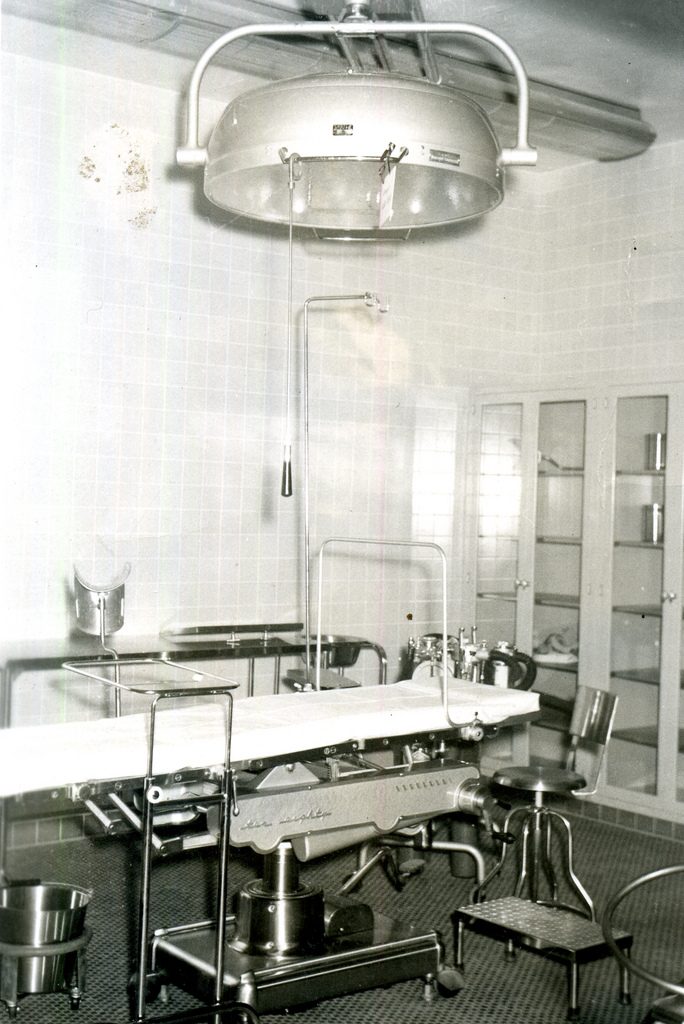
Operating room in St. Ann's Hospital, circa 1953-1954

Bartlett Regional Hospital was originally known as St. Ann's Hospital, and opened in 1886 in downtown Juneau. The hospital was run by the Sisters of Saint Ann until the 1960s. In 1965, control of the hospital was turned over to the City and Borough of Juneau, which built a new hospital on its current location in the Twin Lakes area.

The current hospital was named for Edward Lewis "Bob" Bartlett, an Alaskan politician who served as Alaska's first United States Senator.

== Hospital rating data ==
The HealthGrades website contains the clinical quality data for Bartlett Regional Hospital, as of 2017. For this rating section three different types of data from HealthGrades are presented: clinical quality ratings for nine inpatient conditions and procedures, nine patient safety indicators and the percentage of patients giving the hospital as a 9 or 10 (the two highest possible ratings).

For inpatient conditions and procedures, there are three possible ratings: worse than expected, as expected, better than expected. For this hospital the data for this category is:

- Worse than expected – 5
- As expected – 4
- Better than expected – 0

For patient safety indicators, there are the same three possible ratings. For this hospital safety indicators were rated as:

- Worse than expected – 1
- As expected – 8
- Better than expected – 0

Percentage of patients rating this hospital as a 9 or 10 – 68% Percentage of patients who on average rank hospitals as a 9 or 10 – 69%
