= Auke Bay, Juneau =

Neighborhood of Juneau, Alaska

Auke Bay Áakʼw Tá
- Neighborhood
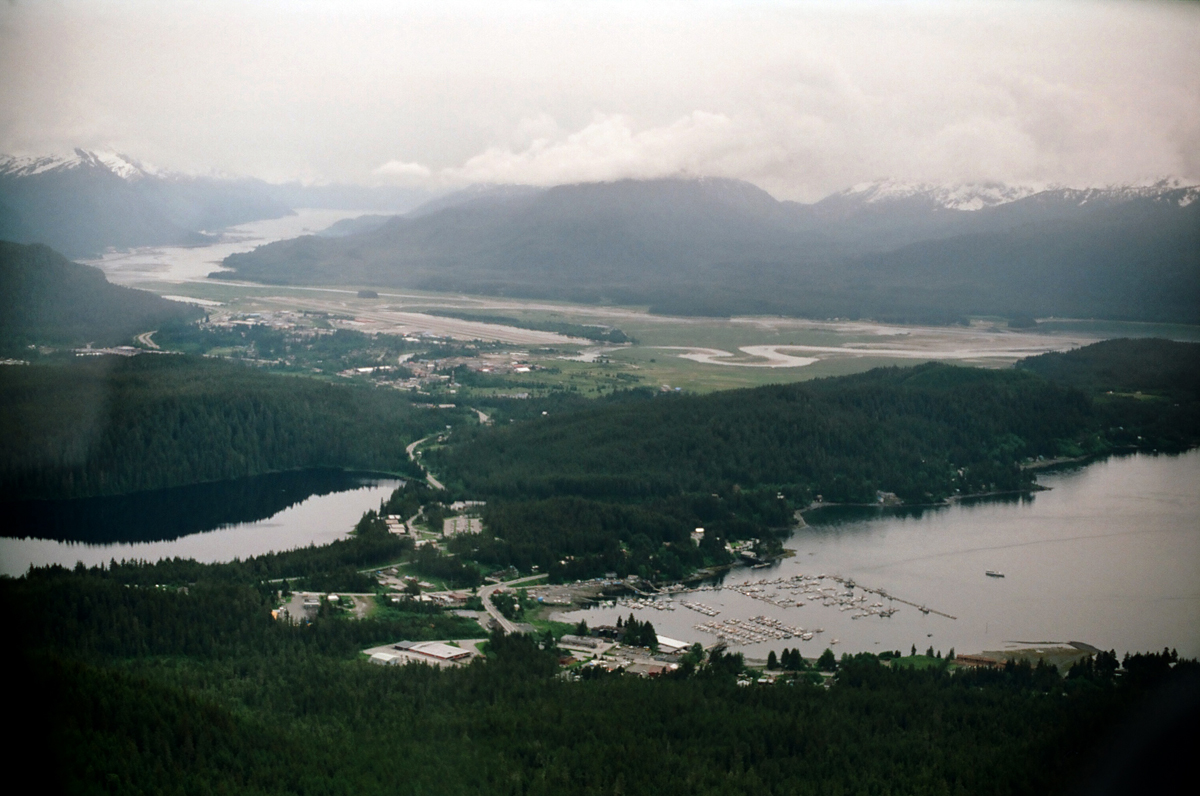
- Aerial view shows Auke Bay (including the harbor and Auke Lake) in the foreground. The Mendenhall Peninsula extends to the right behind the community. The lower Mendenhall Valley, Juneau International Airport and Douglas Island are in the background.

- Location in Alaska
- Coordinates: 58°23′00″N 134°39′35″W
- Country: United States
- State: Alaska
- Borough: City and Borough of Juneau
- Elevation: 9.8 ft (3 m)
- Time zone: UTC-9 (Alaska (AKST))
  - Summer (DST): UTC-8 (AKDT)
- ZIP code: 99801
- Area code: 907
- FIPS code: 02-04760
- GNIS feature ID: 1398469

Auke Bay (Tlingit: Áakʼw Tá) is a neighborhood located in the city and borough of Juneau, Alaska, that contains Auke Bay Harbor, Auke Lake, the University of Alaska Southeast, an elementary school, a church, a post office, a bar, a coffee shop, a waffle house, a thrift shop, a Thai restaurant, and one convenience store.

The view of the Mendenhall Glacier behind Auke Bay and Mount McGinnis towering over Auke Lake are some of the most popular photo opportunities in Juneau. The ferry terminal of the Alaska Marine Highway system is also located further out the road in Auke Bay at about 14 miles.

The flamingo house on Auke Lake is a local attraction, known for its topical or weather-related formations of pink lawn flamingos. Whale watchings targeting curious humpbacks are available. Humpbacks in these areas are known to demonstrate special feeding methods, so-called "bubble-net feeding", and come very close to shores.

The Coast Guard cutter Liberty was homeported at the Auke Bay Harbor for 33 years, before being reassigned to Valdez, Alaska in 2022.

Auke Bay takes its name from the native Auke people, a part of the Tlingit tribe.

== Climate ==
Auke Bay has a warm-summer humid continental climate (Köppen Dfb)

Climate data for Auke Bay, Alaska (1991–2020 normals, extremes 1963–present)
Month	Jan	Feb	Mar	Apr	May	Jun	Jul	Aug	Sep	Oct	Nov	Dec	Year
Record high °F (°C)	58 (14)	58 (14)	60 (16)	71 (22)	79 (26)	85 (29)	89 (32)	83 (28)	73 (23)	63 (17)	56 (13)	55 (13)	89 (32)
Mean maximum °F (°C)	45.2 (7.3)	45.0 (7.2)	49.6 (9.8)	61.5 (16.4)	71.4 (21.9)	77.3 (25.2)	76.9 (24.9)	75.7 (24.3)	65.8 (18.8)	56.6 (13.7)	46.7 (8.2)	44.2 (6.8)	79.9 (26.6)
Mean daily maximum °F (°C)	31.3 (−0.4)	34.7 (1.5)	38.9 (3.8)	48.5 (9.2)	57.4 (14.1)	62.7 (17.1)	63.6 (17.6)	62.5 (16.9)	55.4 (13.0)	46.2 (7.9)	36.8 (2.7)	32.8 (0.4)	47.6 (8.7)
Daily mean °F (°C)	28.2 (−2.1)	30.4 (−0.9)	33.3 (0.7)	41.4 (5.2)	49.8 (9.9)	55.6 (13.1)	57.5 (14.2)	56.6 (13.7)	50.6 (10.3)	42.5 (5.8)	33.8 (1.0)	30.1 (−1.1)	42.5 (5.8)
Mean daily minimum °F (°C)	25.1 (−3.8)	26.1 (−3.3)	27.8 (−2.3)	34.3 (1.3)	42.2 (5.7)	48.4 (9.1)	51.4 (10.8)	50.8 (10.4)	45.8 (7.7)	38.8 (3.8)	30.9 (−0.6)	27.3 (−2.6)	37.4 (3.0)
Mean minimum °F (°C)	7.6 (−13.6)	11.7 (−11.3)	13.6 (−10.2)	25.4 (−3.7)	33.6 (0.9)	41.5 (5.3)	46.4 (8.0)	44.7 (7.1)	37.2 (2.9)	28.9 (−1.7)	18.4 (−7.6)	12.3 (−10.9)	1.5 (−16.9)
Record low °F (°C)	−12 (−24)	−15 (−26)	−8 (−22)	12 (−11)	27 (−3)	32 (0)	38 (3)	37 (3)	27 (−3)	13 (−11)	−4 (−20)	−14 (−26)	−15 (−26)
Average precipitation inches (mm)	5.23 (133)	3.58 (91)	3.10 (79)	3.07 (78)	3.60 (91)	4.34 (110)	5.87 (149)	7.10 (180)	9.91 (252)	7.91 (201)	5.85 (149)	5.51 (140)	65.07 (1,653)
Average snowfall inches (cm)	24.0 (61)	14.8 (38)	10.1 (26)	1.2 (3.0)	0.0 (0.0)	0.0 (0.0)	0.0 (0.0)	0.0 (0.0)	0.0 (0.0)	0.8 (2.0)	11.5 (29)	18.3 (46)	80.7 (205)
Average precipitation days (≥ 0.01 in)	21.0	17.2	17.1	17.4	16.0	17.1	19.0	20.0	23.4	24.6	22.2	21.4	236.4
Average snowy days (≥ 0.1 in)	10.3	7.5	6.2	1.0	0.0	0.0	0.0	0.0	0.0	0.5	5.5	9.3	40.3
Source: NOAA

== Public Safety ==
Fire and EMS coverage is provided by Capital City Fire Rescue. Originally, the Auke Bay Volunteer Fire Department provided services beginning in 1952 under the guiding principal of "neighbors helping neighbors." In 1992, Auke Bay VFD merged along with five other fire departments to become Capital City Fire & Rescue, which serves the majority of the Juneau area. The Auke Bay Fire Station is covered by volunteer firefighters. At night, the station is staffed by "Live-In" Resident Volunteer Firefighters, who are allowed to reside in the station rent-free in exchange for staffing emergency vehicles a required amount of time per month.

Law enforcement is provided primarily by Juneau Police Department, who are supported by the Alaska State Troopers and U.S. Forest Service law enforcement.

The United States Coast Guard Cutter Reef Shark, a Marine-Protector Class Patrol Boat, is homeported out of Auke Bay / Statter Harbor. The cutter's primary mission set includes law enforcement, search and rescue, military operations, and environmental protection. During the summer months, USCG Small Boat Station Juneau maintains a 45' Motor Lifeboat at Reef Shark's moorings, providing a faster search and rescue asset as well as law enforcement capability to the immediate harbor area.

== Demographics ==
Historical population
Census	Pop.	Note	%±
1880	640		—
1890	324		−49.4%
1900	261		−19.4%
1910	218		−16.5%
1950	295		—
1970	490		—
U.S. Decennial Census

Auke Bay first appeared on the 1880 U.S. Census as three separate and unnamed "Auk Villages" with a combined total of 640 Auke Tlingit. These settlements extended beyond the present-day area near Juneau to include Admiralty Island and Douglas Island. In 1890, these were consolidated by the census and reported as "Auk Settlements." It returned simply as "Auke" in 1900 and 1910. It did not report again separately until 1950, by which time it was a suburb of Juneau. It did not appear in 1960, but returned in 1970, just before all locales within Juneau Borough were consolidated into the city of Juneau.

== Alaska Clipper Stop ==
For several months in 1940, Auke Bay was a stop for Pan American Airways "Alaska Clipper". The Alaska Clipper was a Sikorsky S-42B four-engine flying boat. The aircraft was originally named "Bermuda Clipper" and served the Baltimore - Bermuda route. In 1940 it was renamed Alaska Clipper and flew from Matthews Beach on Lake Washington in Seattle to Auke Bay stopping in Ketchikan. The first flight landed in Auke Bay on June 14, 1940 and the last took place on November 6, 1940. After its Alaska service, the plane was renamed again, this time "Hong Kong Clipper II", and began service on the Hong Kong - Manila route. The aircraft was destroyed by Japanese bombing in Hong Kong Harbor on December 8, 1941.

== Auke Bay Marine Station ==
For forty-seven years, Auke Bay was the home of Auke Bay Laboratories, the primary US Government facility researching commercially important fisheries in Alaska. Its studies included estimates of abundance of salmon, sablefish, crabs, and other commercial stocks, and the impact of fishing, development, and industry on those stocks and the habitat on which they rely.

The original Auke Bay Marine Station was funded by Congress in 1958–1959 and opened in 1960. The 4-acre facility was declared surplus by the US Government in 2016, after the Auke Bay Laboratories’ headquarters was moved to the new Ted Stevens Marine Research Institute in 2007. In 2017, an agreement was reached whereby the Federal Government would give part of the property to the University of Alaska – Southeast to support its marine biology program, and part of it to the Juneau Docks and Harbors Division to allow for the expansion of its Statter Harbor facilities in Auke Bay.
