= Mount Roberts (Juneau, Alaska) =

Mountain in Alaska, United States

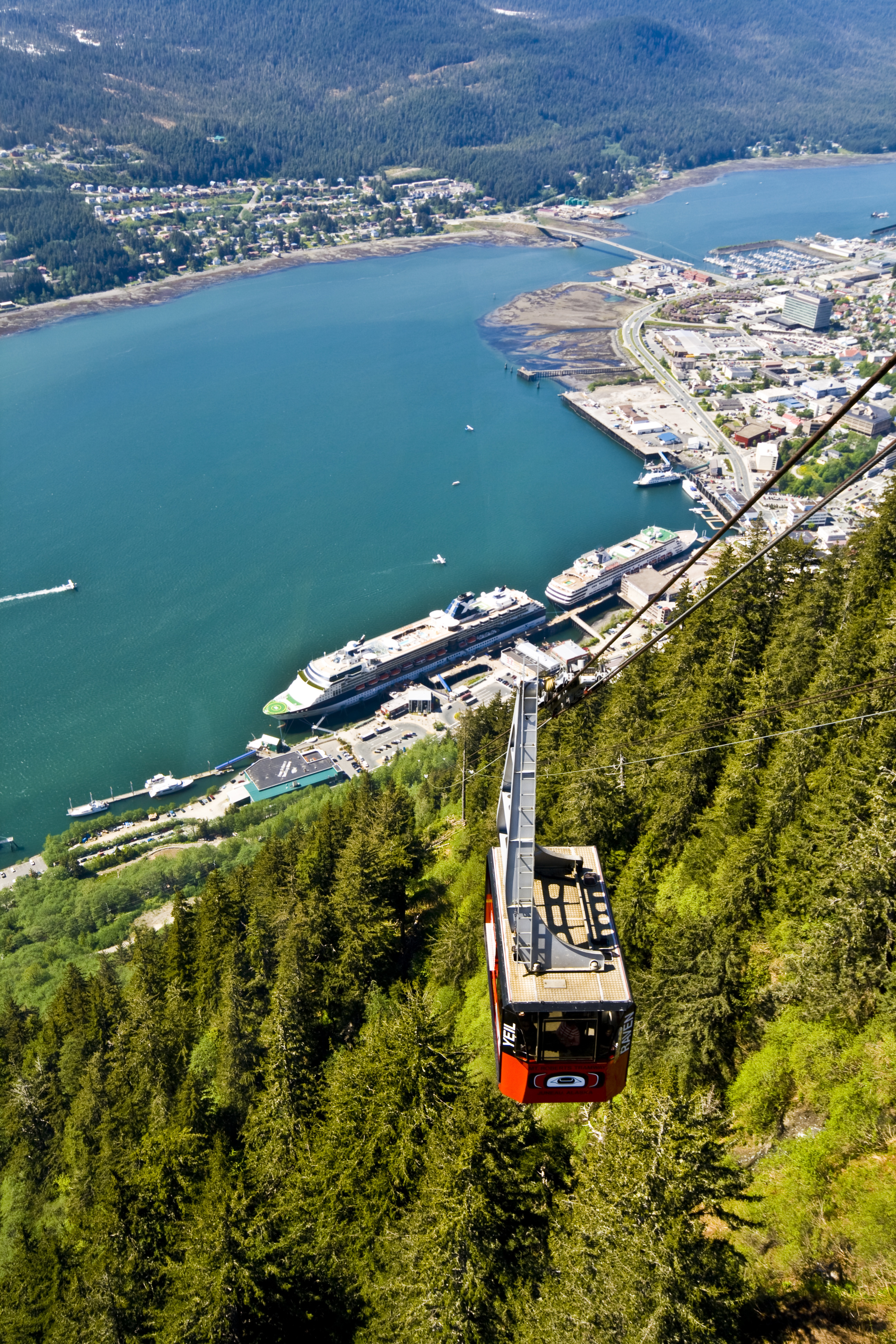
- The Goldbelt Tram in Juneau, Alaska

Highest point
- Elevation: 3,819 ft (1,164 m)
- Prominence: 300 ft (91 m)– roughly
- Coordinates: 58°17′10″N 134°19′34″W

Naming
- Native name: Wooshkeenax̱ Deiyí (Tlingit)

Geography
- Location: Boundary Ranges, Alaska
- Topo map: USGS Juneau

Climbing
- First ascent: Unknown
- Easiest route: Scramble

Mount Roberts or Roberts Peak (Tlingit: Wooshkeenax̱ Deiyí) is a 3,819 foot (1,164 m) mountain just east of downtown Juneau, Alaska. It is noted for its accessibility from downtown Juneau and for the Goldbelt Tram which carries passengers and tourists from sea level to 1,800 feet (550 m) up the mountain.

A trail head behind downtown leads to the top of the tram (with nearly 2 miles of steep switchbacks) and from that point to the summit where the views to the west overlook the harbor, West Juneau and Douglas Island.

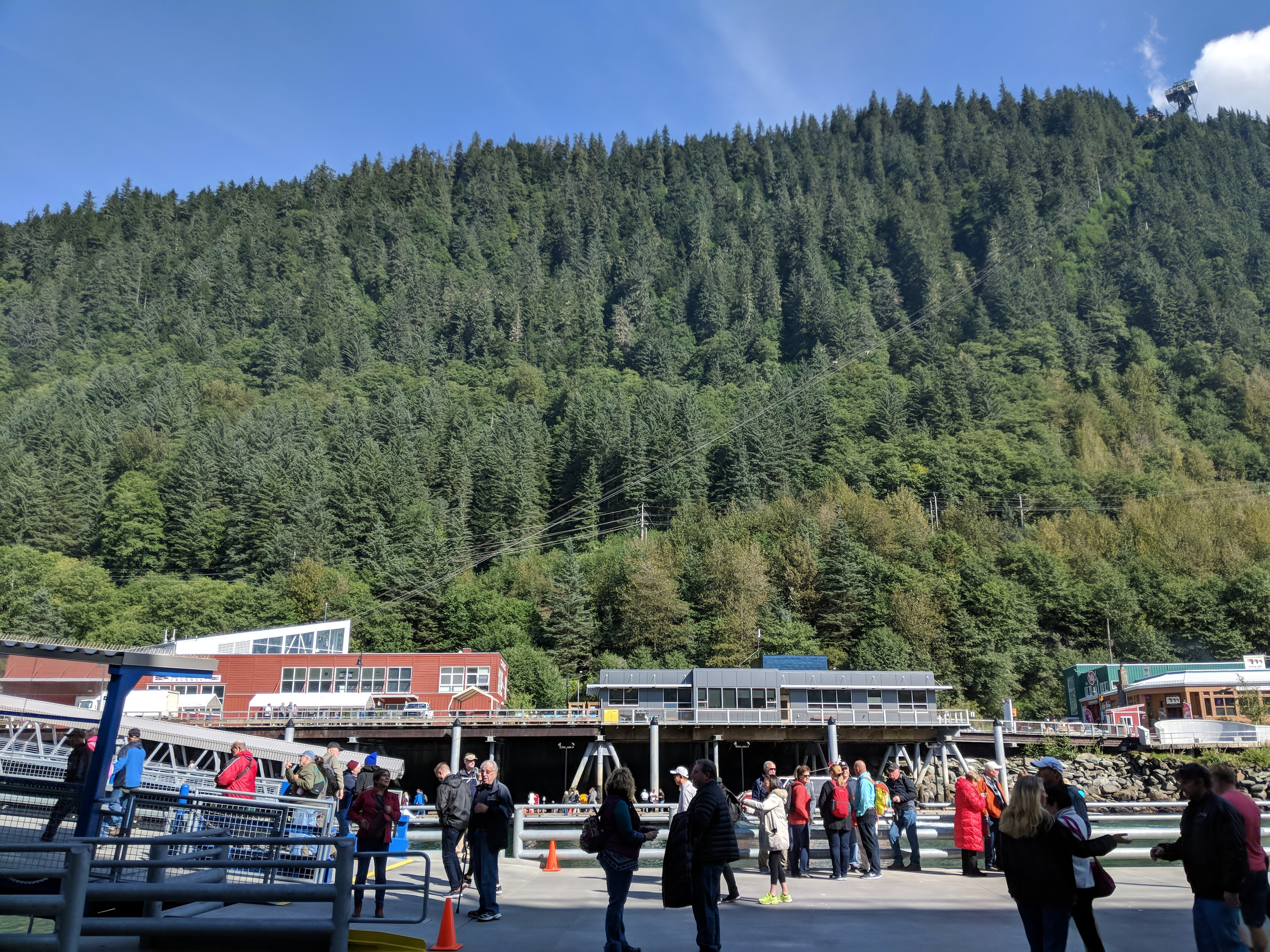
A view of the Goldbelt Tram from the cruise ship docks

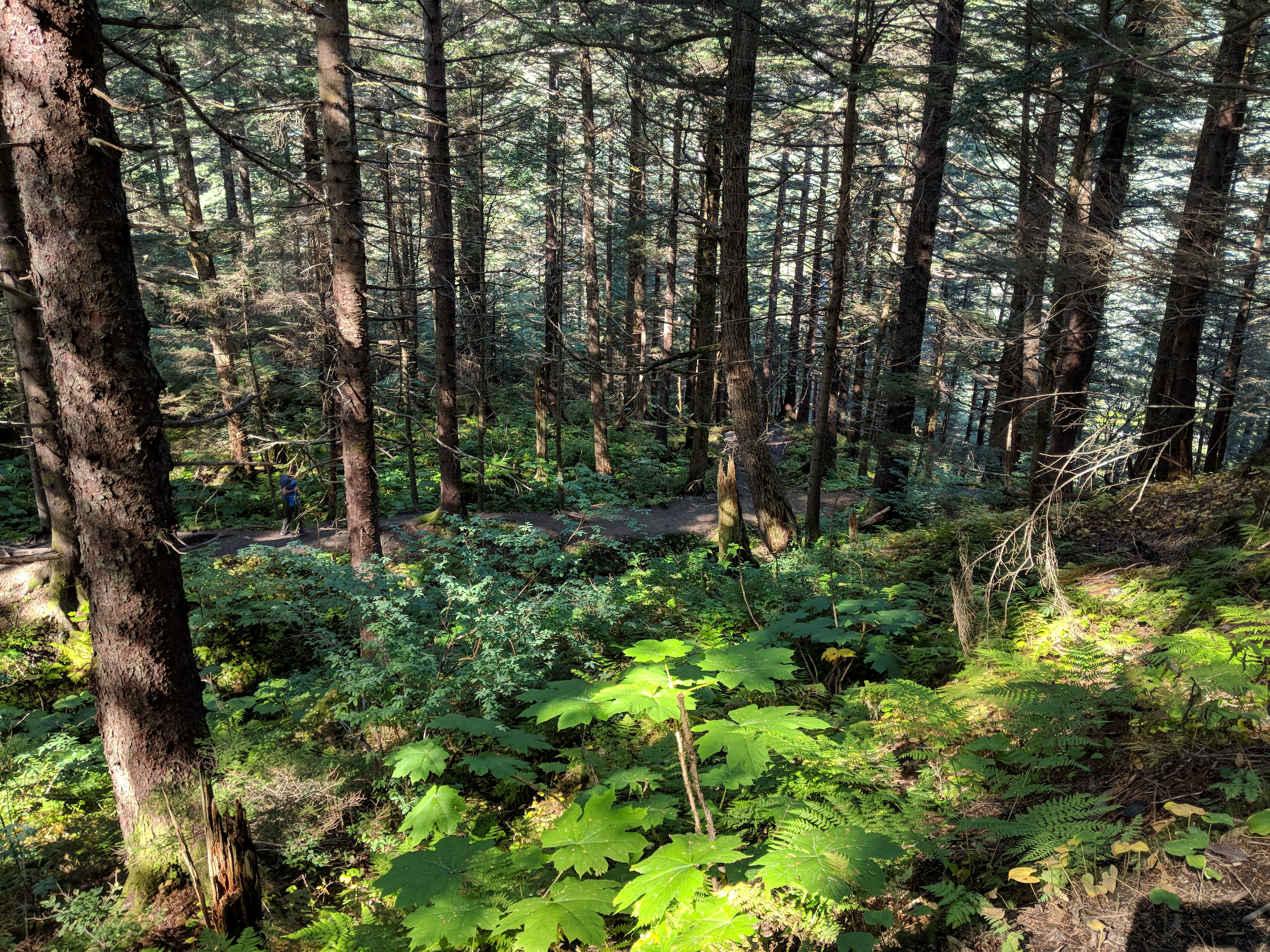
A portion of the trail up the north side of Mount Roberts
