= Goldbelt Tram =

Aerial tramway in Juneau, Alaska

Coordinates: 58.2966°N 134.3873°W

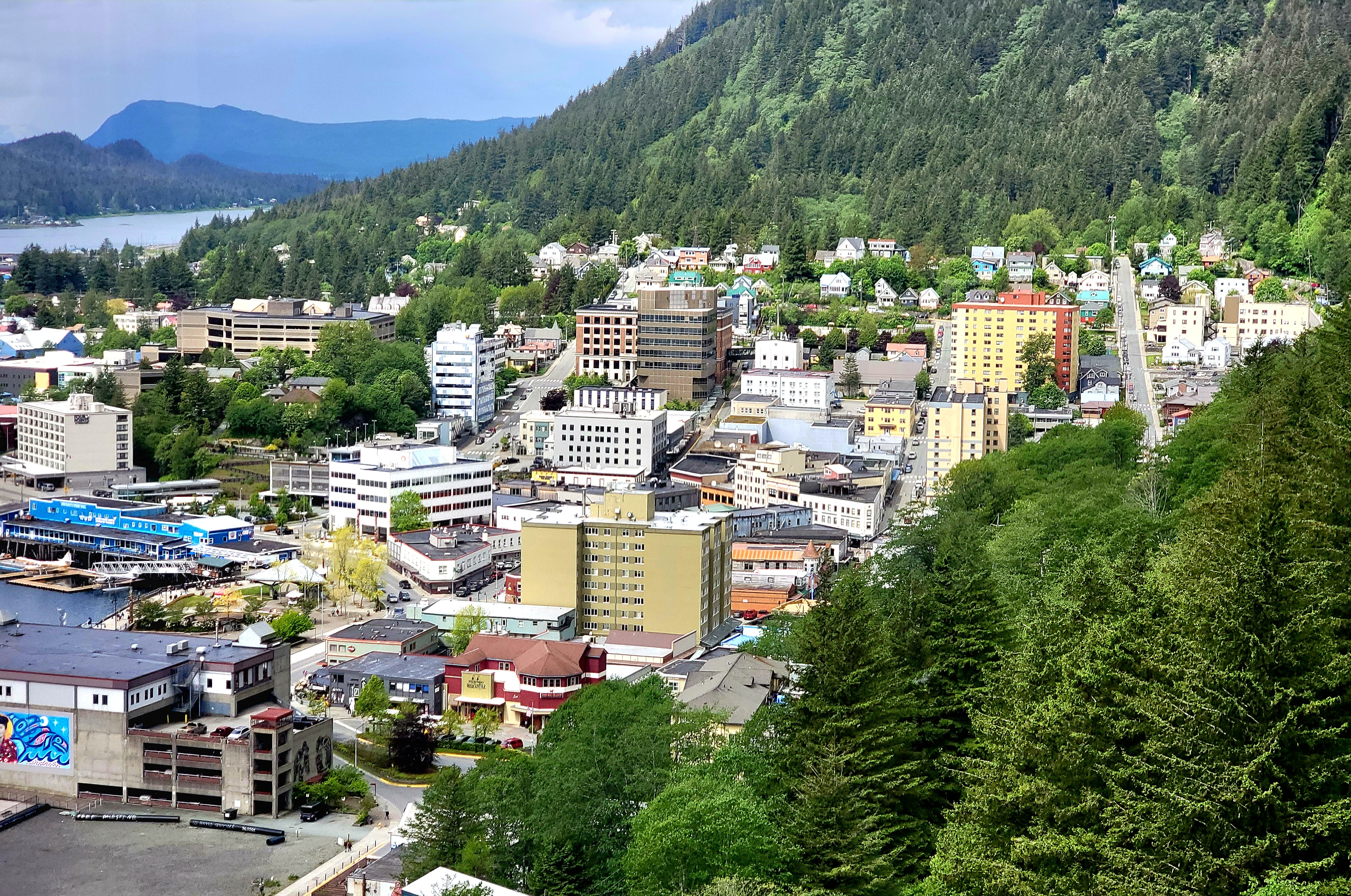
Downtown Juneau, Alaska from the Goldbelt Tram

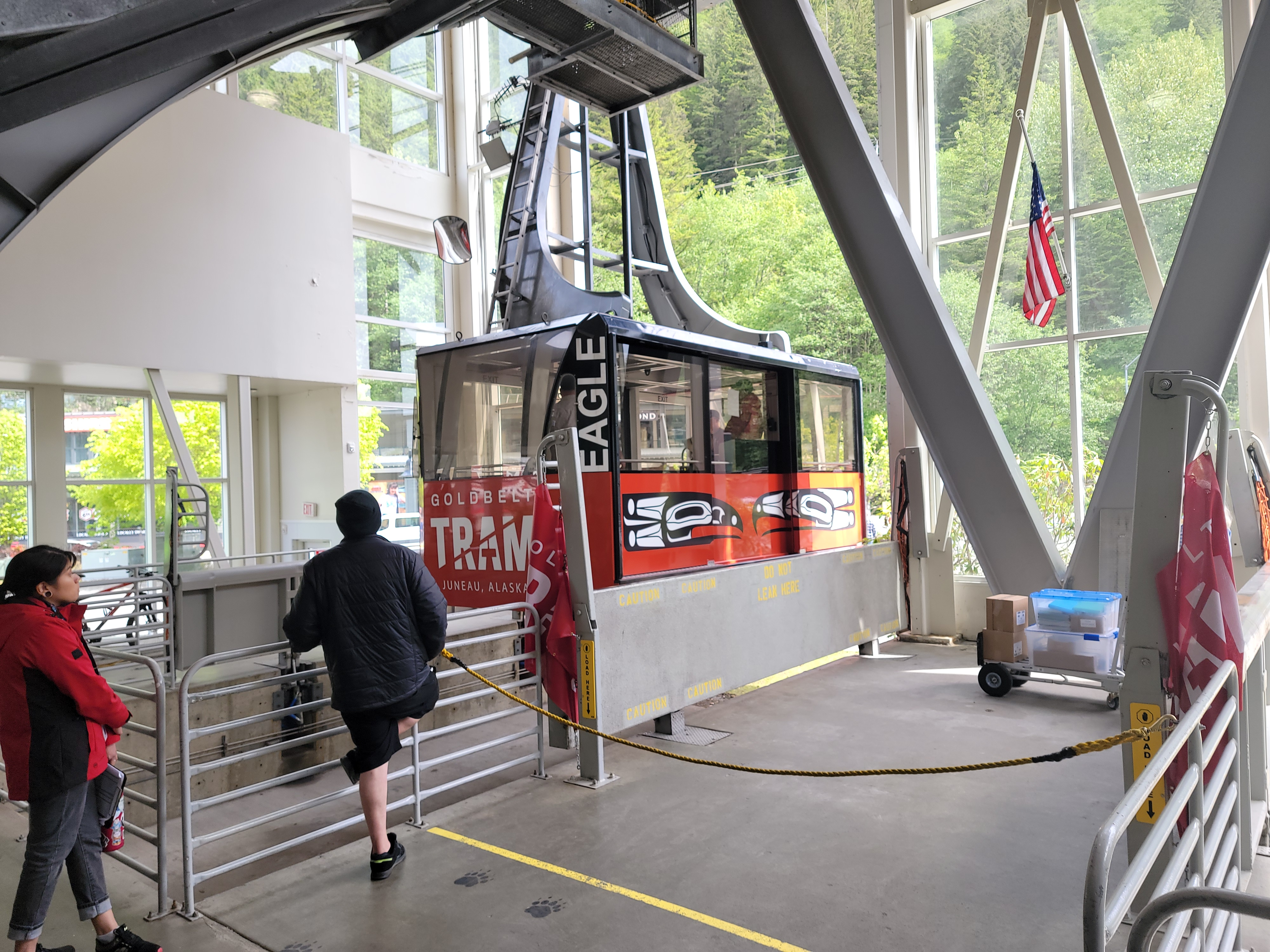
Goldbelt Tram cabin 2024

The Goldbelt Tram (formerly Mount Roberts Tramway) is an aerial tramway located directly south of downtown Juneau in the U.S. state of Alaska. In operation since 1996, the tram makes a six-minute ascent of 3,819-foot (1,164 m) up Mount Roberts from the cruise ship docks (just feet above sea level) to a height of about 1,800 feet (550 m).

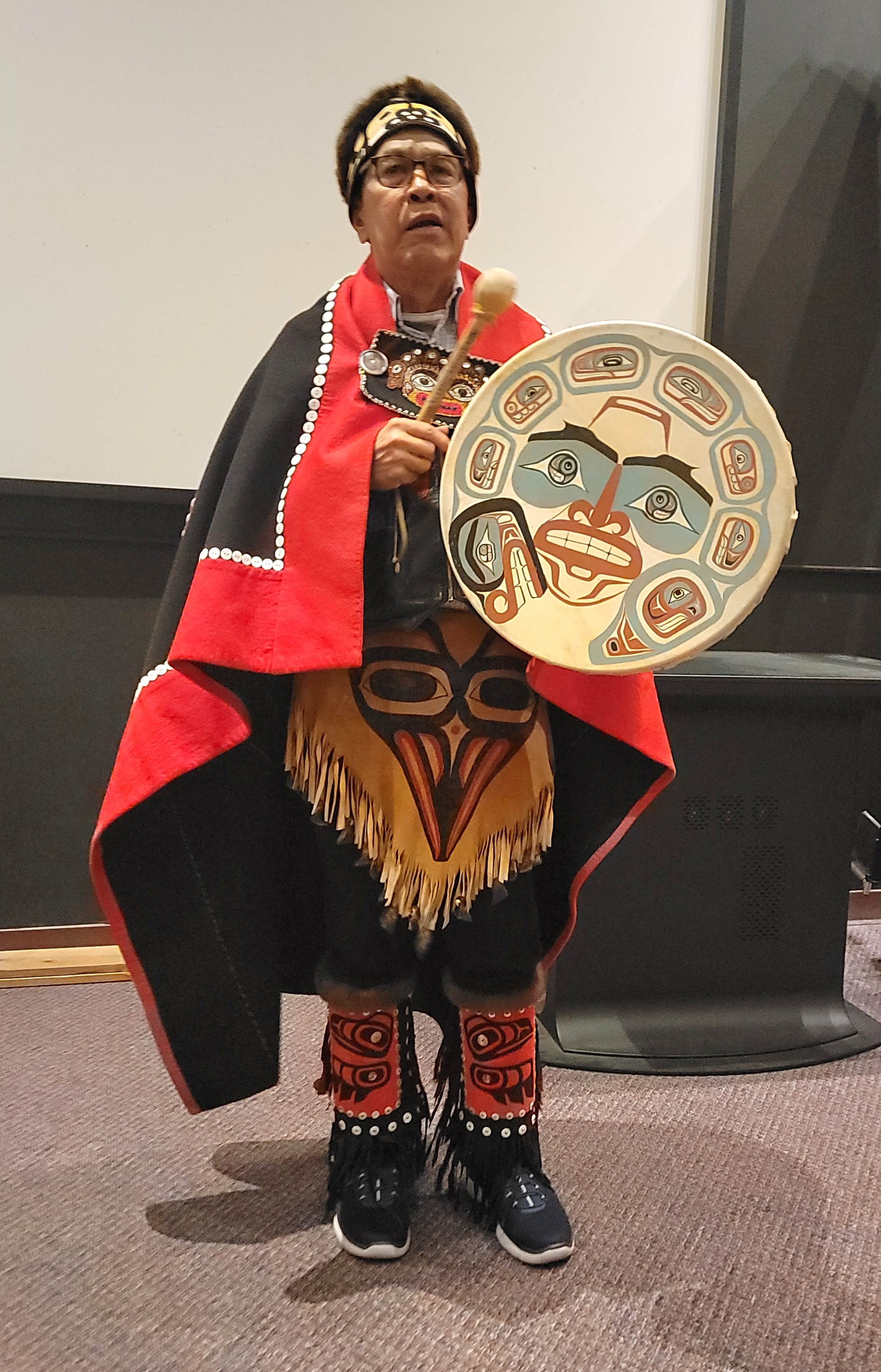
Tlingit performer in the theater at the top of the Goldbelt Tram

A restaurant, theater, retail shop, and nature center are located at the top of the tramway, as well as connections to trails leading both up and down the mountain. A trail up the mountain leads to a large cross erected by Roman Catholic Father Brown in the early 1900s.

== History ==
The tramway was conceived by John Heiser in 1994. Heiser, together with Bruce Booher, Marc Bond, Kevin Branson and Ron Greisen, formed Mount Roberts Development Corporation (MRDC). MRDC designed the facility, acquired the necessary land and rights-of-way, and obtained permits. Following the preliminary stages, MRDC partnered with Goldbelt, Incorporated, the ANCSA corporation for Alaska Natives in and from Juneau, to finance, construct and operate the venture. MRDC managed the partnership and oversaw construction of the tramway. The tram opened for limited operation in September 1996 and the grand opening was held in May 1997. MRDC sold its partnership interest to Goldbelt the following year. Anne Hunter, the tram's operation manager, was contracted to stay on another year as part of the sale agreement. The tram ferried nearly 160,000 people to the alpine region above downtown Juneau the summer of 1997, its first full season. It was built in 1996 at a cost of nearly $16 million (or $33 million today) and took in $3 million in revenue in its first year of operation ($6 million today).

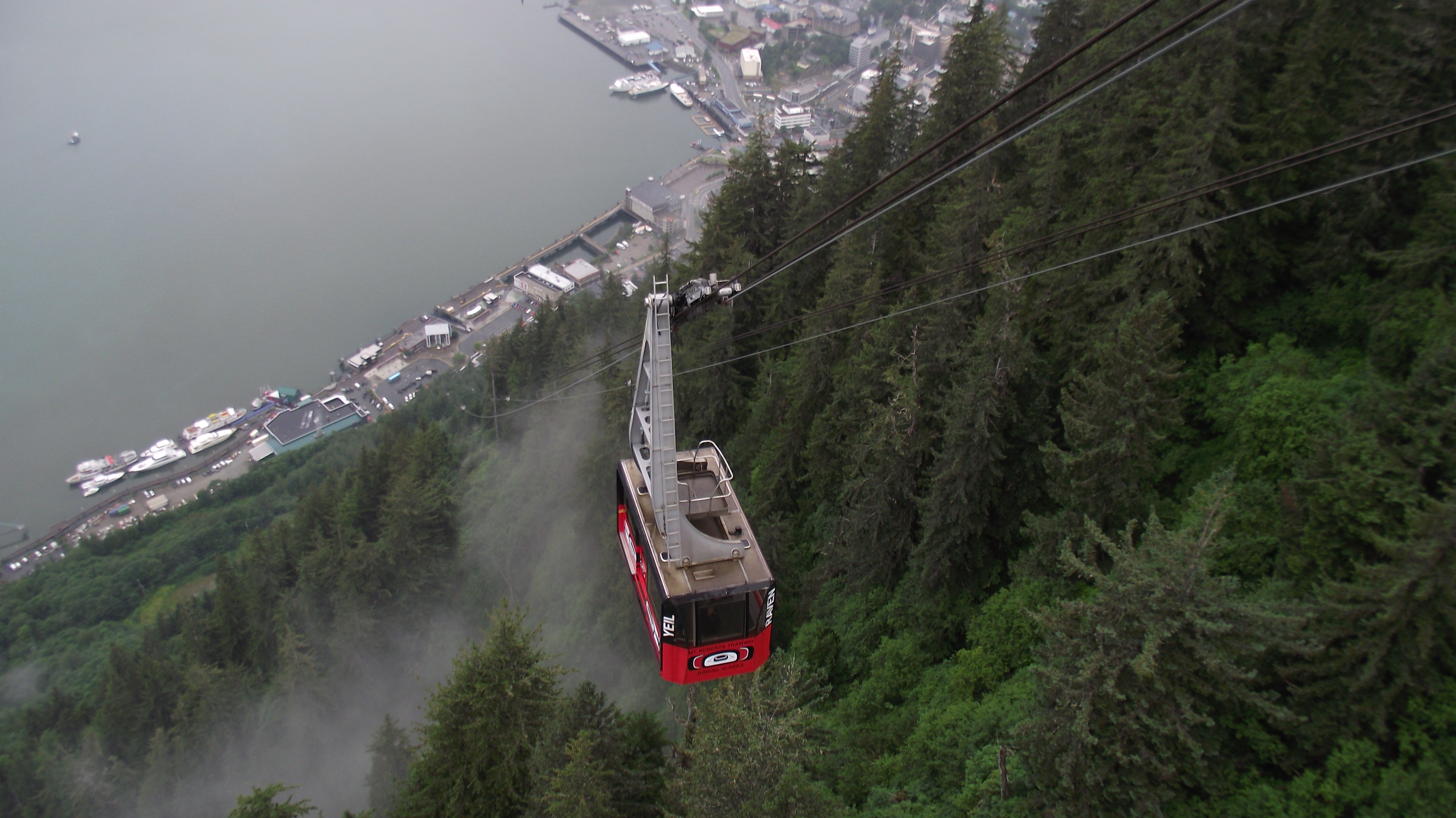
Tram ascending to the Skybridge

The Goldbelt Tram is one of Southeast Alaska's most popular tourist attractions, with around 200,000 visitors each summer.

On April 30, 2026, the tram failed to slow down as it approached the bottom of the tramway, sending two people (employees) to the hospital.. As of June 17, 2026, the tram remains closed.

== Technical information and operation ==
The Goldbelt Tram uses a cable transportation system known as an aerial tramway, first used in the European Alps in the late 1800s. Tramways have been traditionally associated with ski areas, but today these systems are also used in other visitor attractions, material hauling and urban transportation. Leitner-Poma of America, the Goldbelt Tram builder, is a subsidiary of Pomagalski, S. A., the world's largest supplier of ropeway transportation systems.

The tram has two 60-passenger cabins, capable of a maximum uphill capacity of 1050 people per hour. Maximum speed is 2,000 ft/min (10 m/s; 23 mph). This type of tram is known as a double-reversible or "jig-back". Both cabins are coupled to a common haul rope and they move in unison, one up and one down.

The main drive system is a 600 hp 500V DC GE electric motor. The full-time back up system has two 360 hp Cummins diesel engines with a hydro static drive. Both systems are coupled to a common gearbox.

The haul rope is 7,875 ft (2,400 m) of 1.4 in (35 mm) solid core cable. The cable has a breaking strength of 172,230 lb (78,120 kg). The haul cable operates at 30,050 lb (13,630 kg) tension per side. The cabins ride on two each 2.0 in (50 mm) double locking coil track ropes. Each cable is 3,526 ft (1,075 m) long with a breaking strength of 616,700 lb (279,700 kg). All cables were manufactured by Fatzer of Switzerland.

== Base facilities ==
The base terminal of the tram is located on the cruise ship docks on South Franklin Street. The terminal building features a large main hall, ticket windows, loading platforms with waiting areas, offices, and maintenance facilities for the tram.

== Summit facilities ==
The top terminal of the tram is located on a tower and has views of the City of Juneau and the Gastineau Channel, Douglas Island and the community of Douglas to the west, the Chilkat Mountain Range to the north, and Kupreanof Island to the South.

The terminal platform is joined to the ridge of Mount Roberts by the Skybridge which leads to the summit facilities. The main building includes the Timberline Bar & Grill, the Chilkat Theater showing an informative film of the local Alaska Natives, and Raven Eagle Gifts. Located at the main building is the Stephen Jackson totem pole, a modern rendition of traditional Native themes.

Several hiking trails with varying degrees of difficulty (including wheel-chair accessible paths) have been laid out leading from the summit facilities. Many of these feature extensive views from the Mount Roberts ridgeline, and some wind through the forest trees and meadows with wild flowers and animals. The forest paths feature trees with totemic carvings depicting Native legends. Interpretive markers describing many of the flowers, plants, trees, birds and animals are placed along the loop trail for self-guided walks.
