= Nugget Towers =

Mountain ridge in Alaska, United States

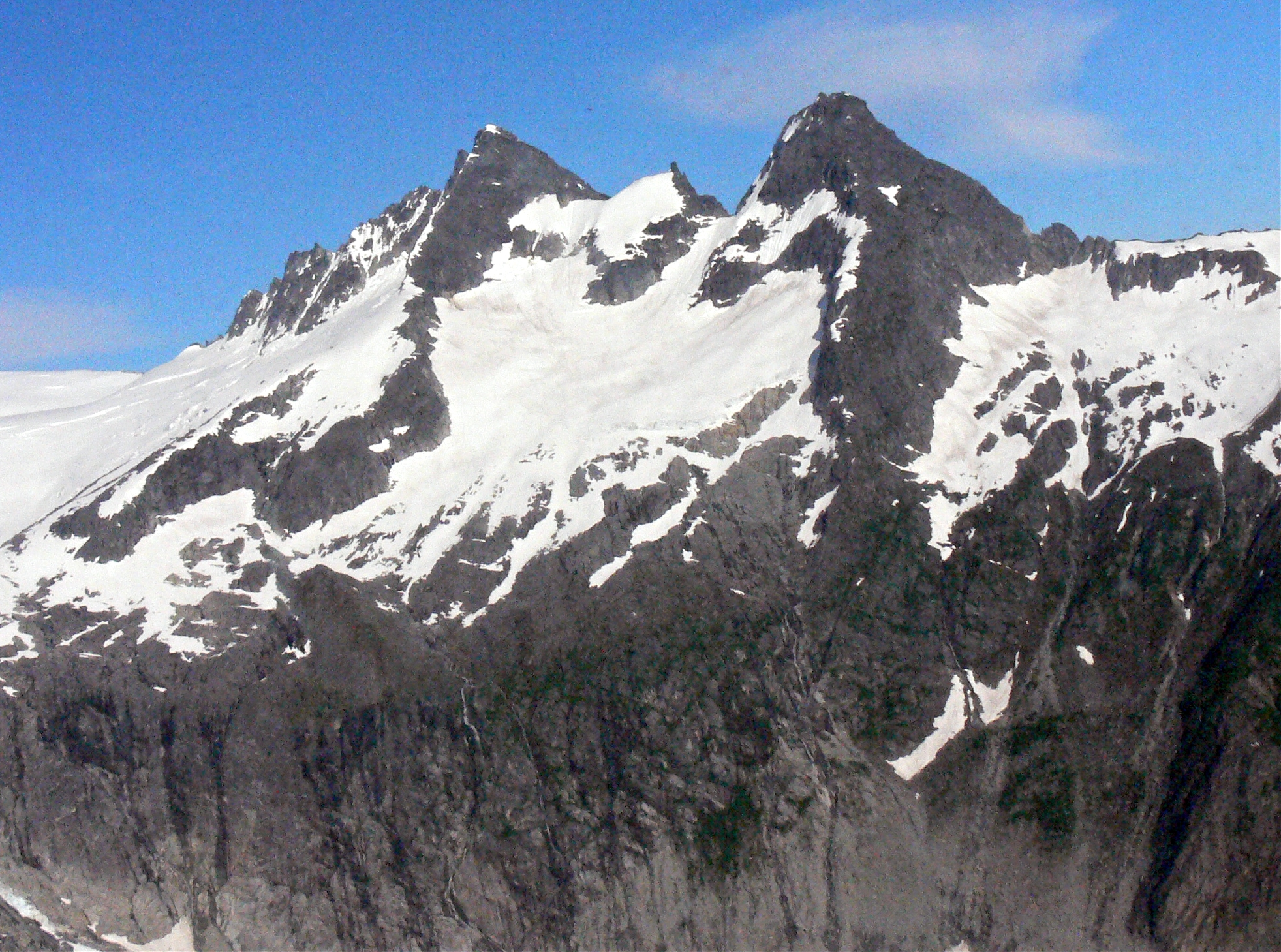
- Nugget Towers, northwest aspect

Highest point
- Elevation: 5,378 ft (1,639 m)
- Prominence: 778 ft (237 m)
- Parent peak: Mount Wrather
- Isolation: 1.73 mi (2.78 km)
- Coordinates: 58°27′04″N 134°27′41″W

Geography
- Location within Alaska
- Interactive map of Nugget Towers
- Location: Tongass National Forest; Juneau Borough; Alaska, United States
- Parent range: Coast Mountains; Boundary Ranges; Juneau Icefield
- Topo map: USGS Juneau B-2

Climbing
- Easiest route: class 5.4

Nugget Towers is a mountain ridge with a series of peaks, two primarily, the highest of which is 5,378-ft (1,639 m) elevation, and located on the southern periphery of the Juneau Icefield, in the Boundary Ranges of southeast Alaska. These peaks are situated east of Mendenhall Glacier, 10 mi (16 km) north of Juneau, and 1.9 mi (3 km) northeast of Bullard Mountain, on land managed by Tongass National Forest. Stroller White Mountain lies 4.5 mi (7 km) west-northwest on the opposite side of the glacier, and Heintzleman Ridge lies 3 mi (5 km) to the south. Although modest in elevation, relief is significant since the mountain rises 3,500 feet (1,067 m) above Nugget Creek's upper basin in less than one mile. Precipitation runoff from the mountain drains into Mendenhall Lake via Nugget Creek and Nugget Falls. This geographic feature's local name was reported in 1965 by U.S. Geological Survey.

== Climate ==
Based on the Köppen climate classification, Nugget Towers is located in a subarctic climate zone with cold, snowy winters, and mild summers. Weather systems coming off the Gulf of Alaska are forced upwards by the Coast Mountains (orographic lift), causing heavy precipitation in the form of rainfall and snowfall. Temperatures can drop below −20 °C with wind chill factors below −30 °C. This climate supports the Mendenhall Glacier to the mountain's west, and Juneau Icefield to its north. The month of July offers the most favorable weather for viewing and climbing Nugget Towers.

== Gallery ==
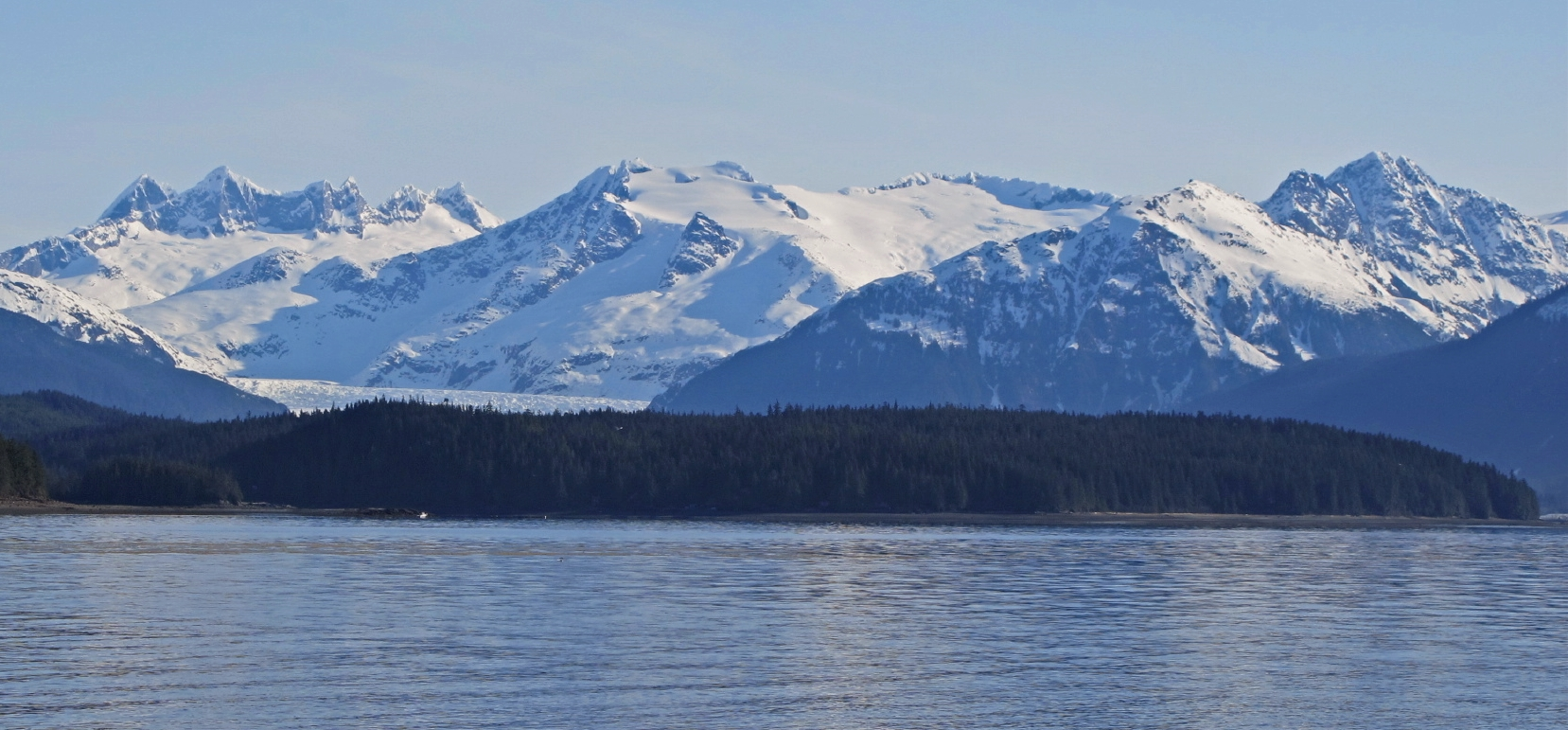
Left to rightː Mendenhall Towers, Mt. Wrather, Bullard Mountain, Nugget Towers seen from Douglas Island

== See also ==
- List of mountain peaks of Alaska
- Geography of Alaska
- Nugget Mountain
