= Bullard Mountain =

Mountain in Alaska, United States

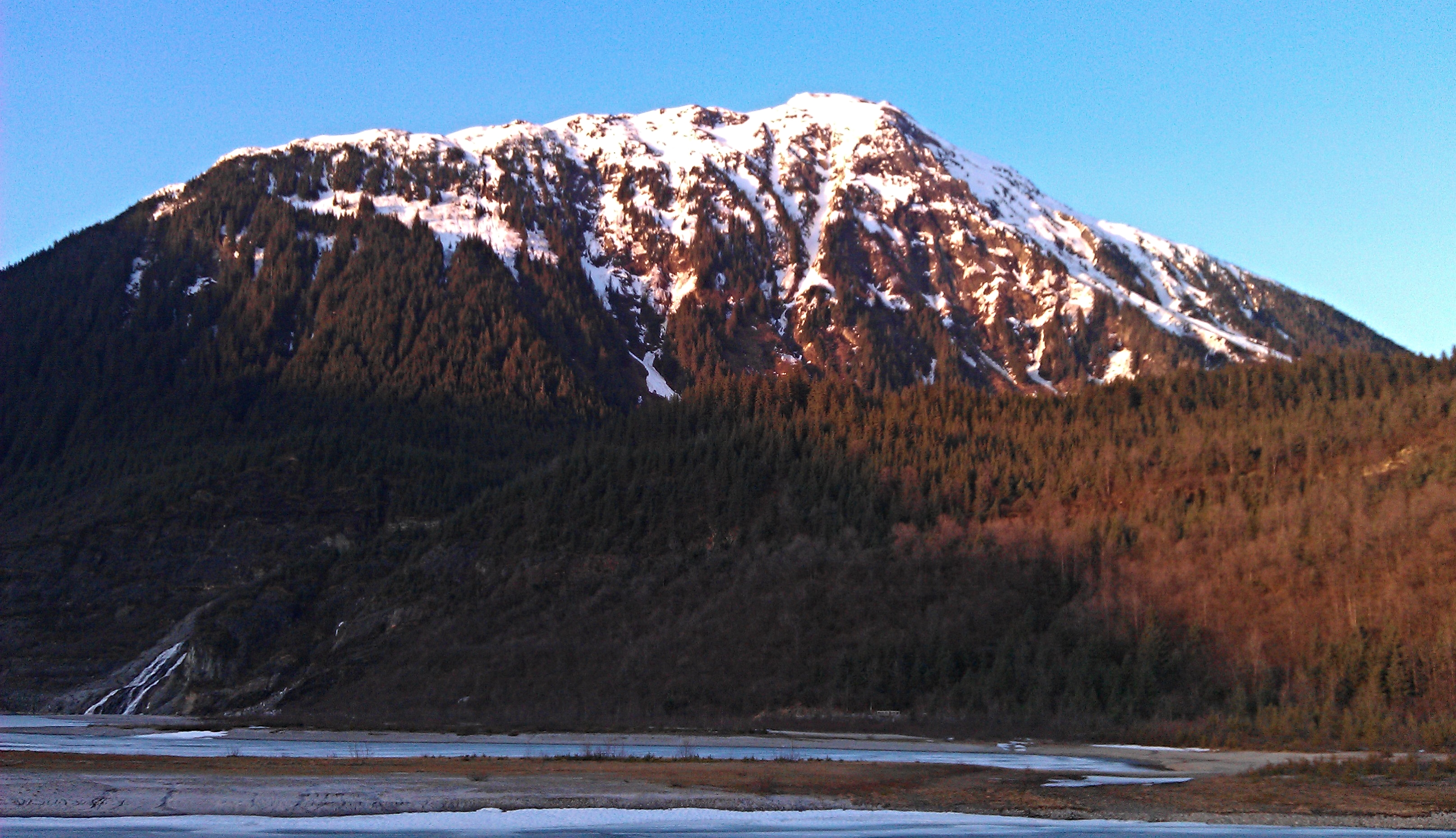
- Bullard Mountain, southwest aspect (Nugget Falls in lower left)

Highest point
- Elevation: 4,225 ft (1,288 m)
- Prominence: 782 ft (238 m)
- Parent peak: Nugget Towers
- Coordinates: 58°26′03″N 134°30′09″W

Geography
- Location within Alaska
- Interactive map of Bullard Mountain
- Location: Tongass National Forest; Juneau Borough; Alaska, United States
- Parent range: Coast Mountains; Boundary Ranges; Juneau Icefield
- Topo map: USGS Juneau B-2

Climbing
- Easiest route: Scrambling class 4

Bullard Mountain is a 4,225-foot (1,288 m) mountain summit located in the Boundary Ranges, in the U.S. state of Alaska. The peak is situated immediately east of the terminus of Mendenhall Glacier, within Tongass National Forest, 9 mi (14 km) north-northwest of Juneau, and 6 mi (10 km) northeast of Juneau International Airport. McGinnis Mountain lies 3.7 mi (6 km) on the opposite side of the glacier, and Heintzleman Ridge lies 2.75 mi (4 km) to the south. Bullard Mountain is often seen and photographed with Mount Wrather, a 5,968-foot (1,819 m) summit 3.9 mi (6 km) to the north because they are together in the background behind Mendenhall Lake, a popular tourist and recreation area. Although modest in elevation, relief is significant since the mountain rises from this nearly sea-level lake in less than two miles. Precipitation runoff from the mountain drains into the lake via Nugget Creek and Nugget Falls. Bullard Mountain is named for Benjamin Bullard (1848-1933), a mining engineer who, in 1907, began mining on Nugget Creek where he later built a hydroelectric power plant.

== Climate ==
Based on the Köppen climate classification, Bullard Mountain is located in a subarctic climate zone with cold, snowy winters, and mild summers. Temperatures can drop below −20 °C with wind chill factors below −30 °C. This climate supports the Mendenhall Glacier to the mountain's west. The month of July offers the most favorable weather for viewing and climbing this peak.

== Gallery ==
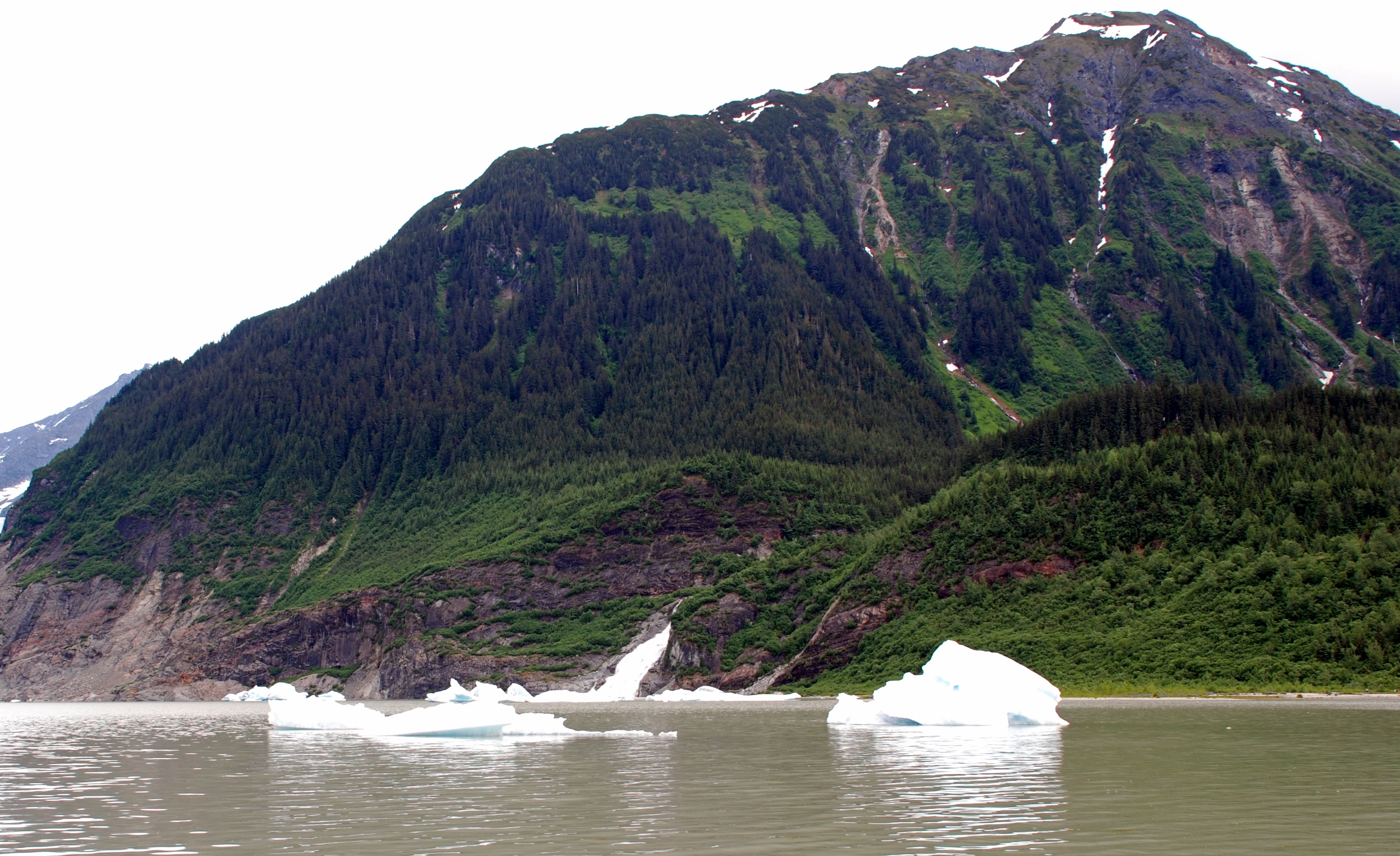
Bullard Mountain and Nugget Falls

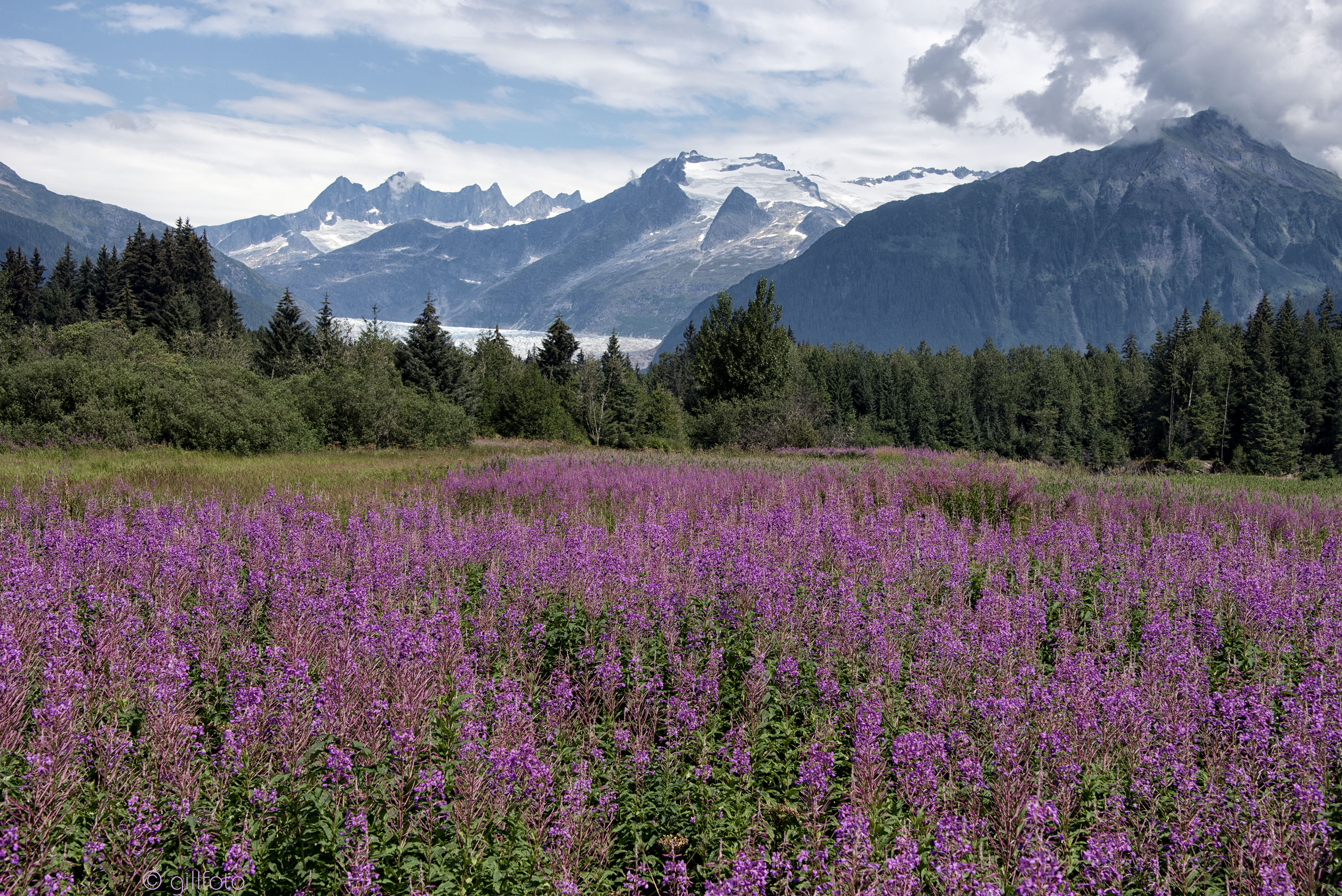
Mt. Wrather (center), Bullard Mountain (right)

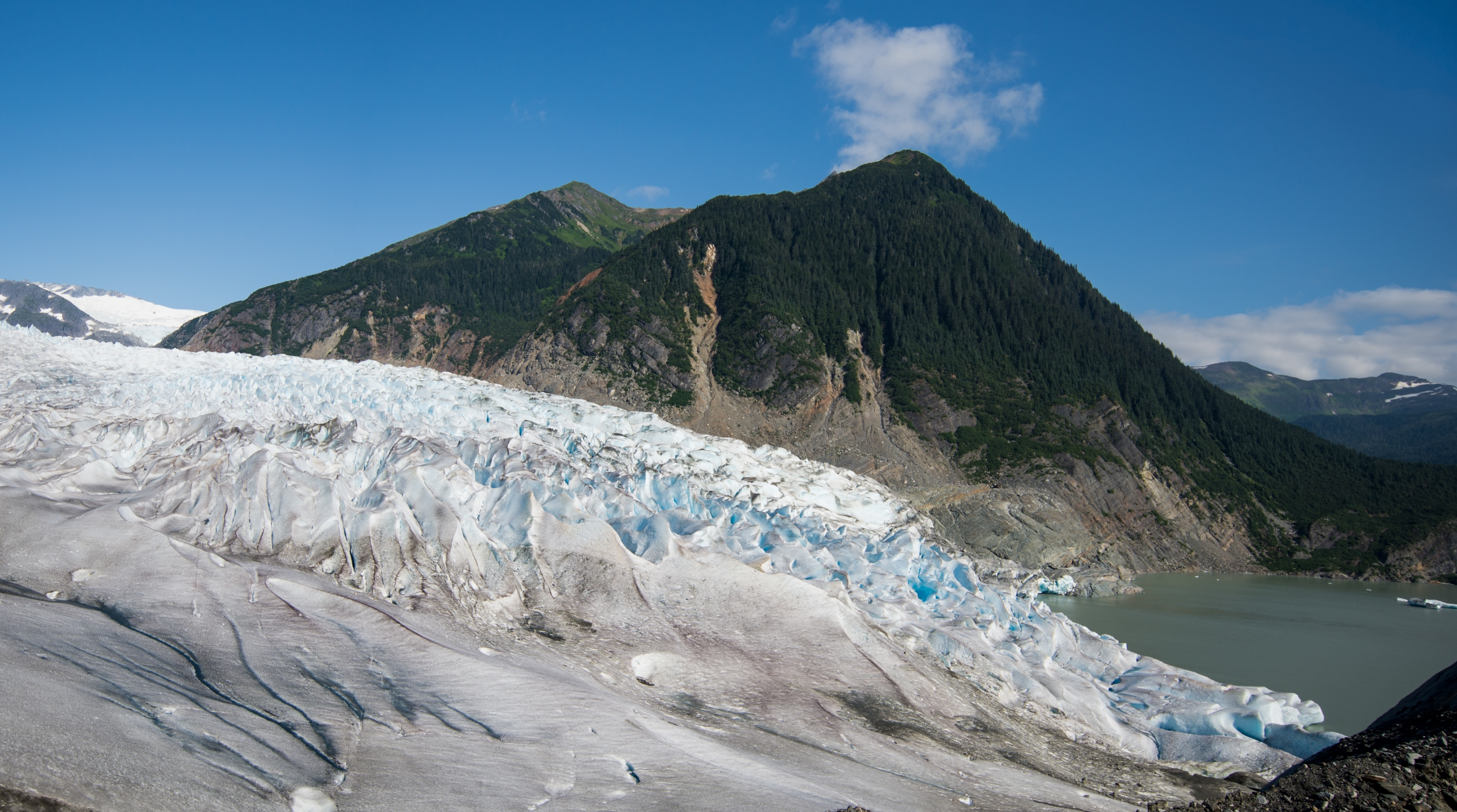
Bullard Mountain from the west

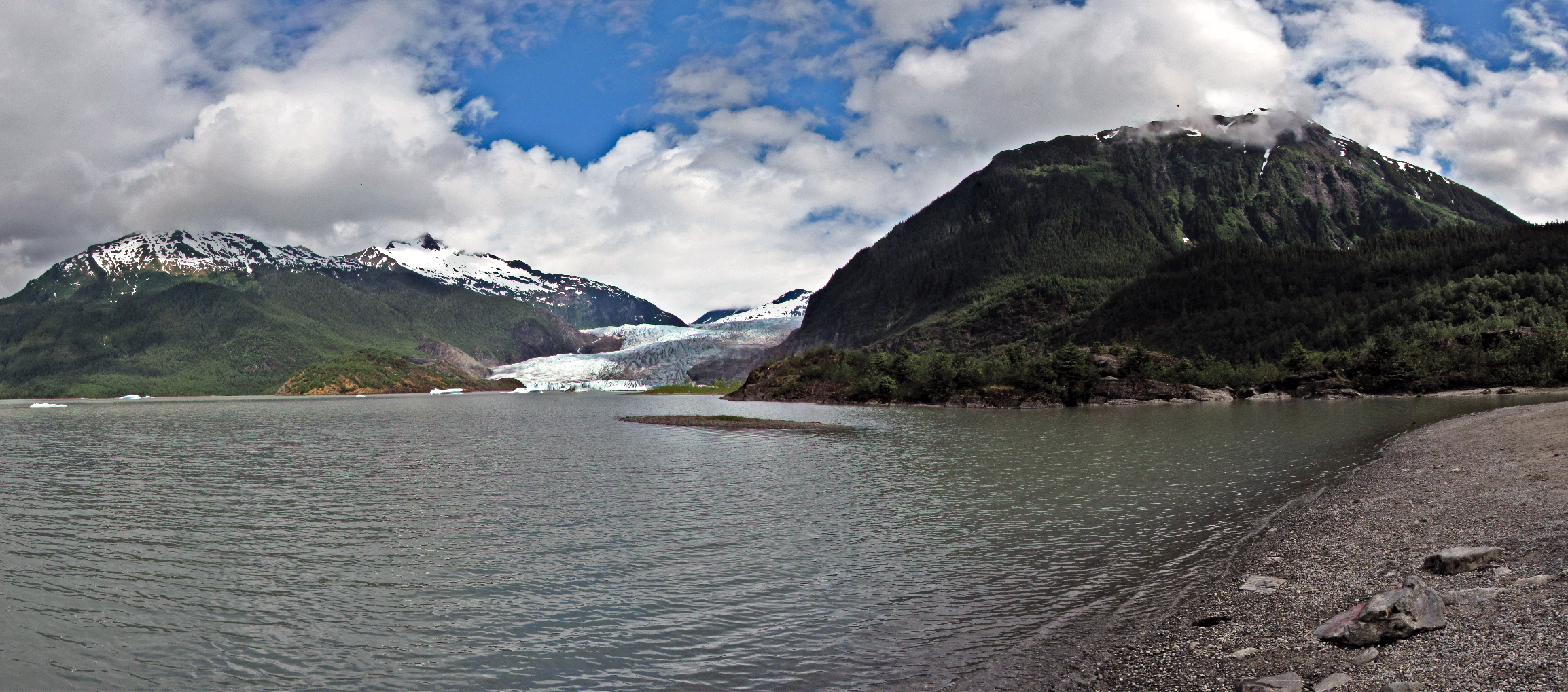
Left to right: McGinnis Mountain, Stroller White Mountain, Mendenhall Glacier, and Bullard

== See also ==
- List of mountain peaks of Alaska
- Geography of Alaska
