= McGinnis Mountain =

Mountain in Alaska, United States

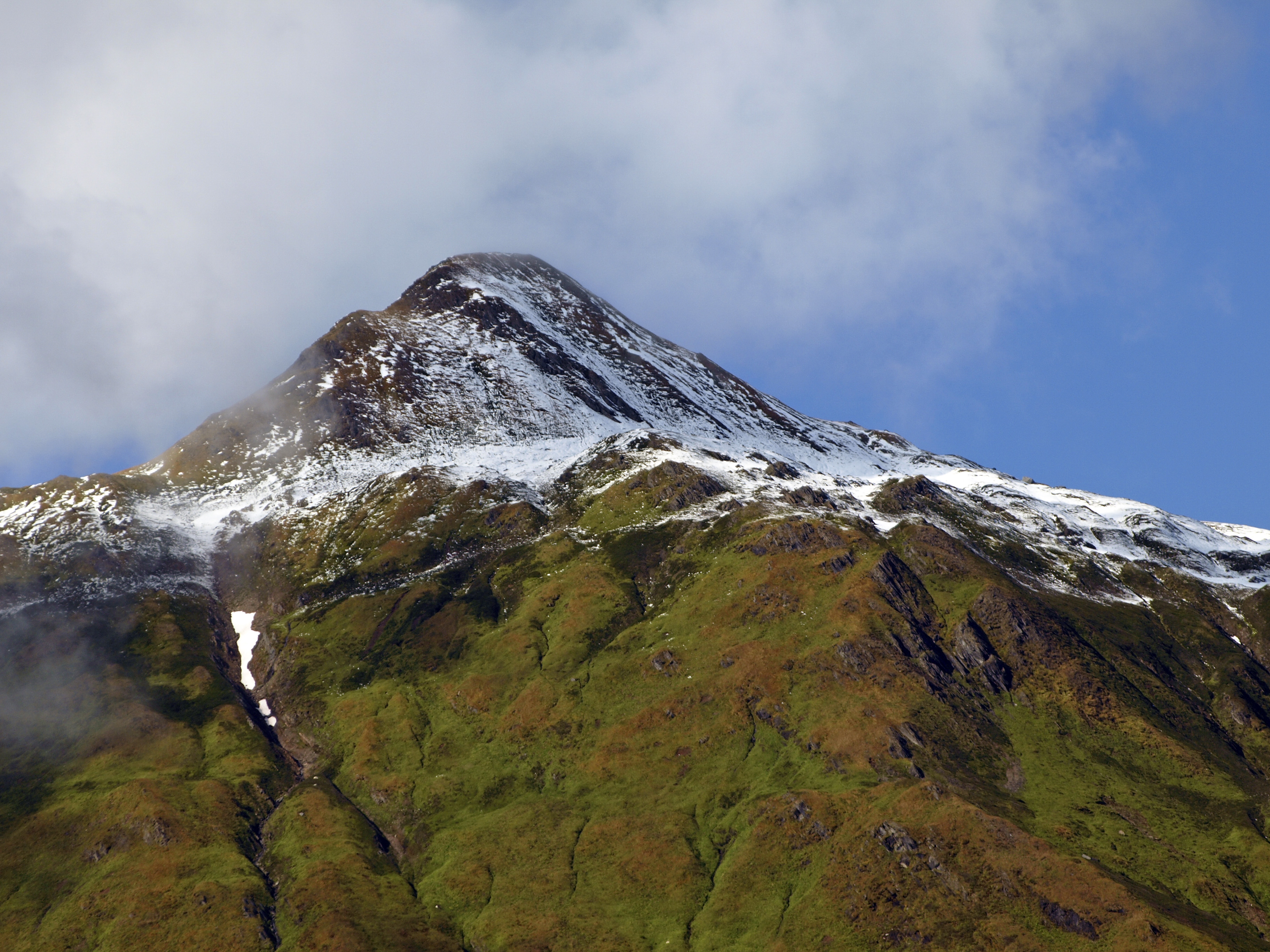
- McGinnis Mountain summit

Highest point
- Elevation: 4,232 ft (1,290 m)
- Prominence: 656 ft (200 m)
- Parent peak: Stroller White Mountain
- Coordinates: 58°27′07″N 134°35′54″W

Geography
- Location within Alaska
- Interactive map of McGinnis Mountain
- Location: Tongass National Forest; Juneau Borough; Alaska, United States
- Parent range: Coast Mountains; Boundary Ranges; Juneau Icefield
- Topo map: USGS Juneau B-2

McGinnis Mountain, also known as Mount McGinnis, is a 4,232-foot (1,290 m) mountain summit located in the Boundary Ranges, in the U.S. state of Alaska. The peak is situated near the toe of the Mendenhall Glacier, within Tongass National Forest, 11 mi (18 km) north-northwest of Juneau, Alaska, and 6 mi (10 km) north of Juneau International Airport. Although modest in elevation, relief is significant since the mountain rises up from sea level at Auke Bay in less than five miles. McGinnis Mountain is often seen and photographed with Stroller White Mountain, a 5,118-foot (1,560 m) summit 1.6 mi (3 km) to the north because they are together in the background behind Mendenhall Lake, a popular tourist and recreation area.

== History ==
The mountain's name was officially adopted in 1930 by the United States Geological Survey McGinnis Mountain takes its name from McGinnis Creek, which drains its northern slopes. McGinnis Creek in turn was originally named McInnis River in 1891 by John McInnis and Edward Brennan who had staked claims in the area. In 1903, the name was reported as McGinnis Creek by the USGS.

== Climate ==
Based on the Köppen climate classification, McGinnis Mountain is located in a subarctic climate zone with cold, snowy winters, and mild summers. Temperatures can drop below −20 °C with wind chill factors below −30 °C. This climate supports the Mendenhall Glacier and Juneau Icefield to the mountain's east. May and June are the best months for climbing in terms of catching favorable weather.

== Gallery ==
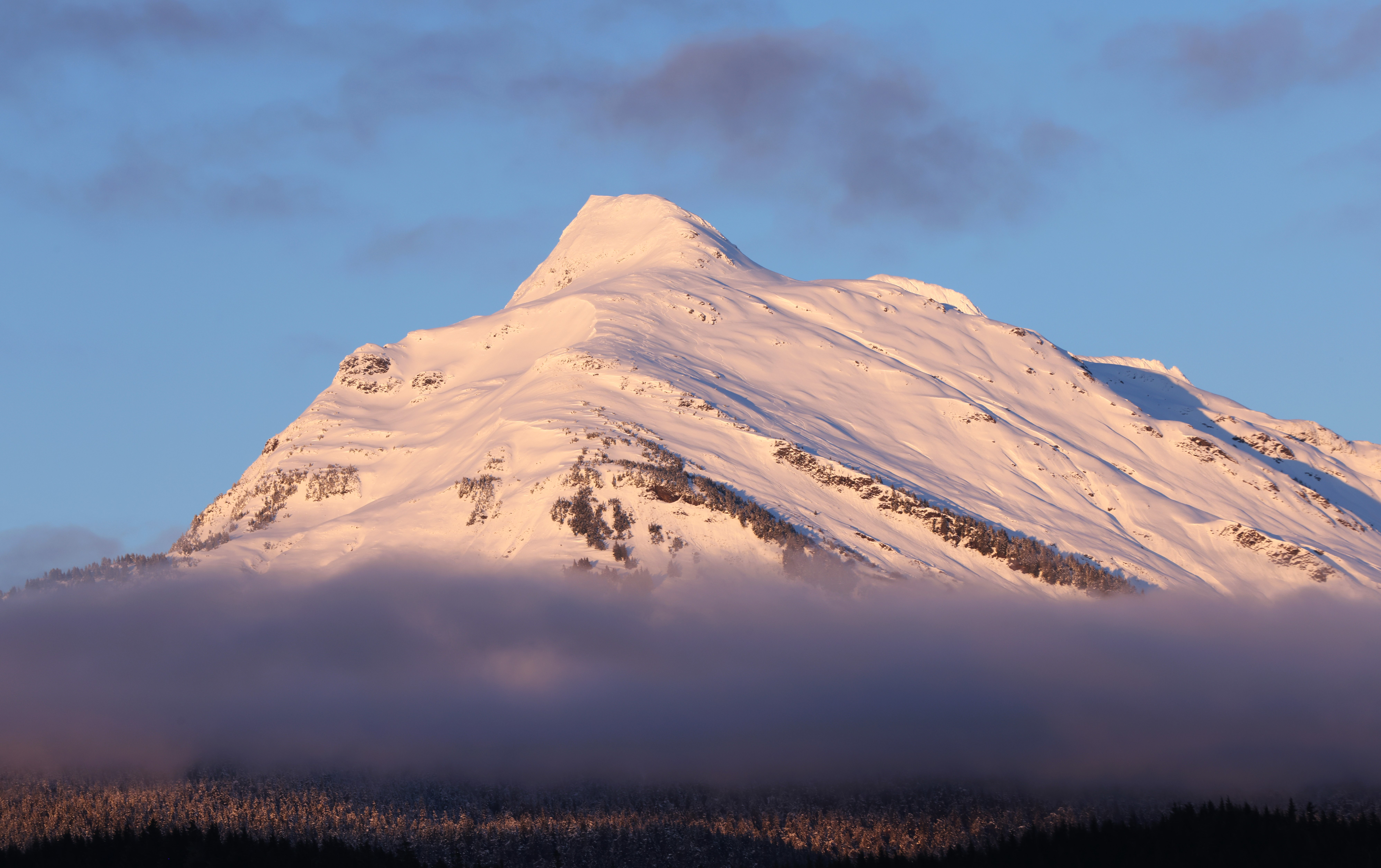
McGinnis in winter

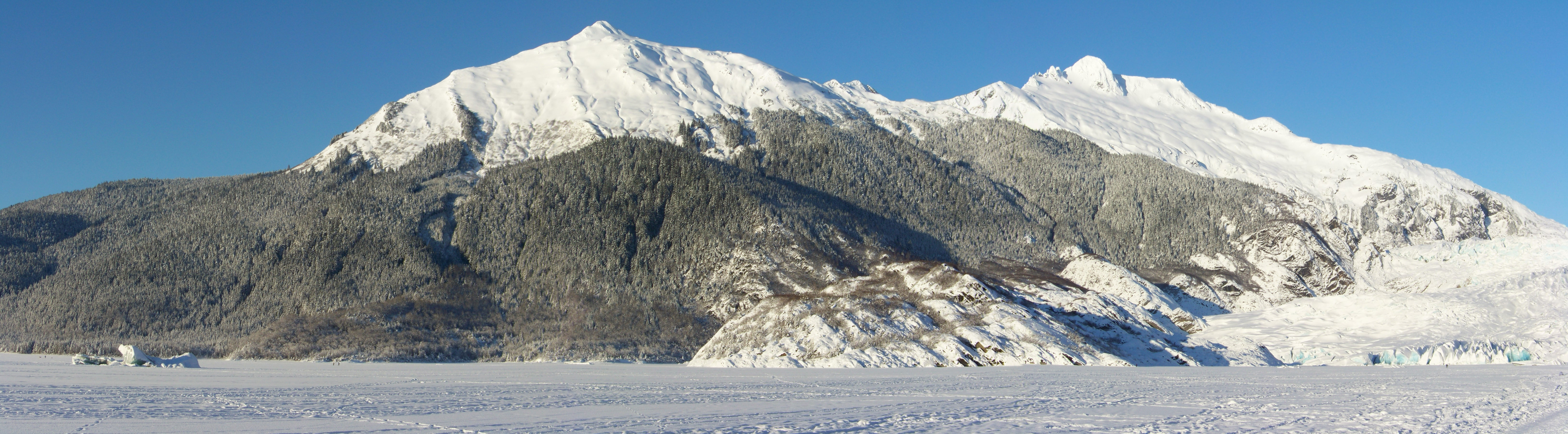
McGinnis Mountain and Stroller White Mountain (right) in winter

McGinnis centered, seen with Stroller White, Mendenhall Glacier, and Nugget Falls from the Mendenhall Glacier Visitor Center

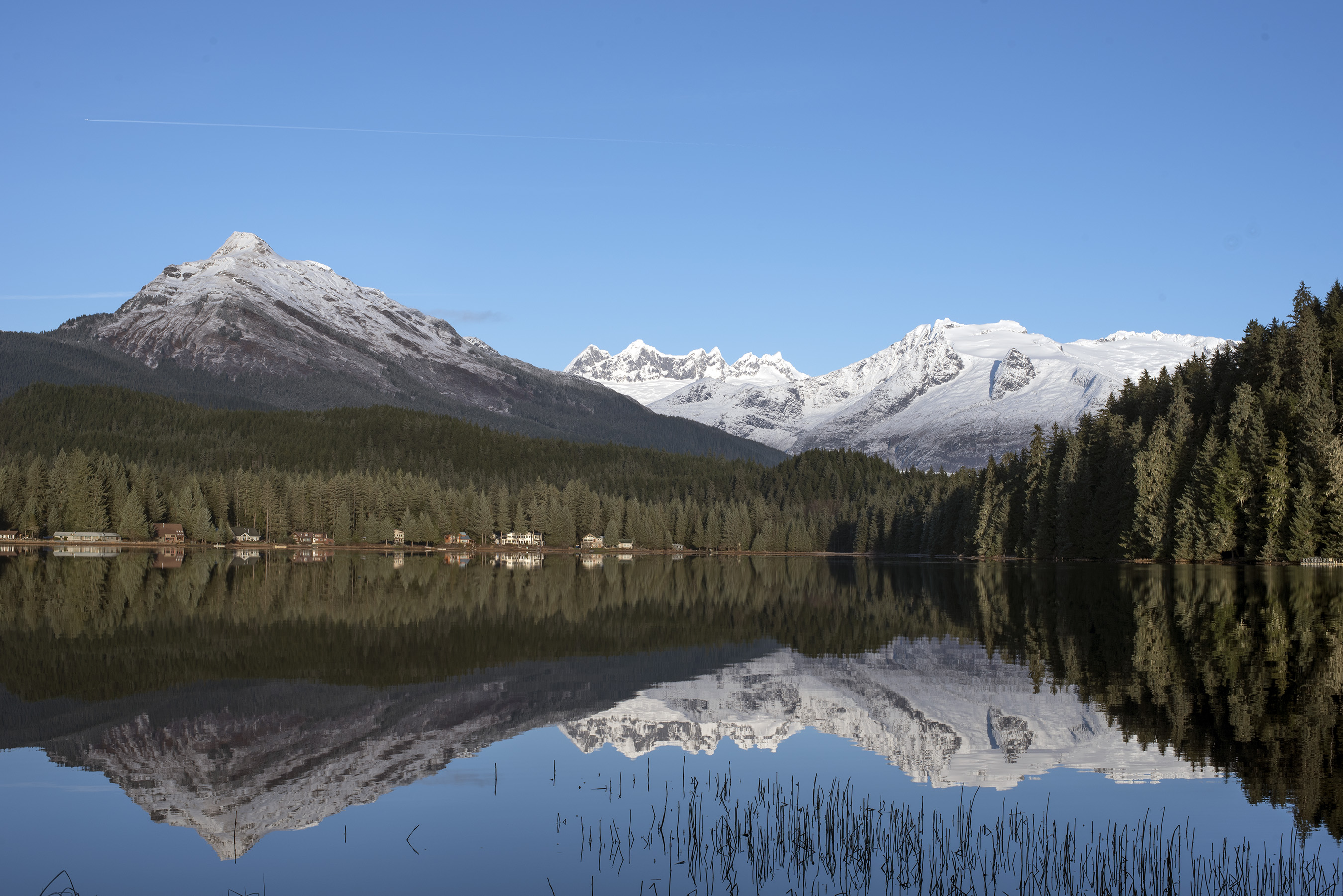
McGinnis (left), Mendenhall Towers, and Mt. Wrather reflected in Auke Lake

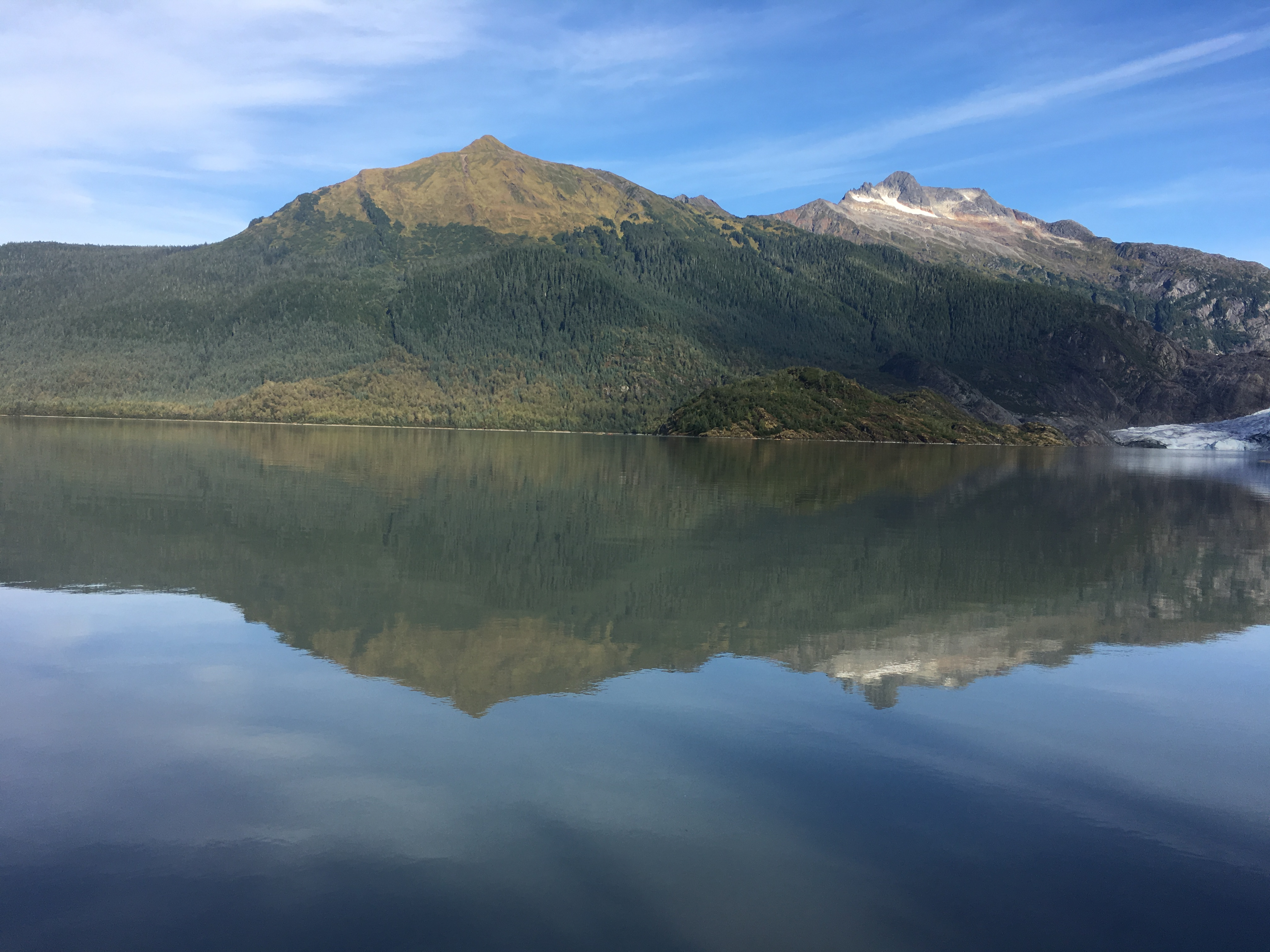
McGinnis and Stroller White reflected in Mendenhall Lake

== See also ==
- List of mountain peaks of Alaska
- Geography of Alaska
- Bullard Mountain
