= Nugget Creek =

Coordinates: 58°25′53″N 134°28′30″W

Nugget Creek is fed by the Nugget Glacier, a tributary glacier on the mountainside east of Auke Bay in the borough of Juneau, Alaska, US. The creek feeds Nugget Falls. The valley of Nugget Creek joins that of Mendenhall River about 1.5 miles (2.4 km) above the foot of the glacier. Its basin, about 3 miles (4.8 km) in length, trends east and west, and there are several tributary gulches which head against the Lemon Creek divide. The rocks of the valley belong to the group of schists which lies next to the main diorite, except at the headwaters, where the edge of the intrusive rock appears.
