= Mount Wrather (Alaska) =

Mountain in Alaska, U.S.

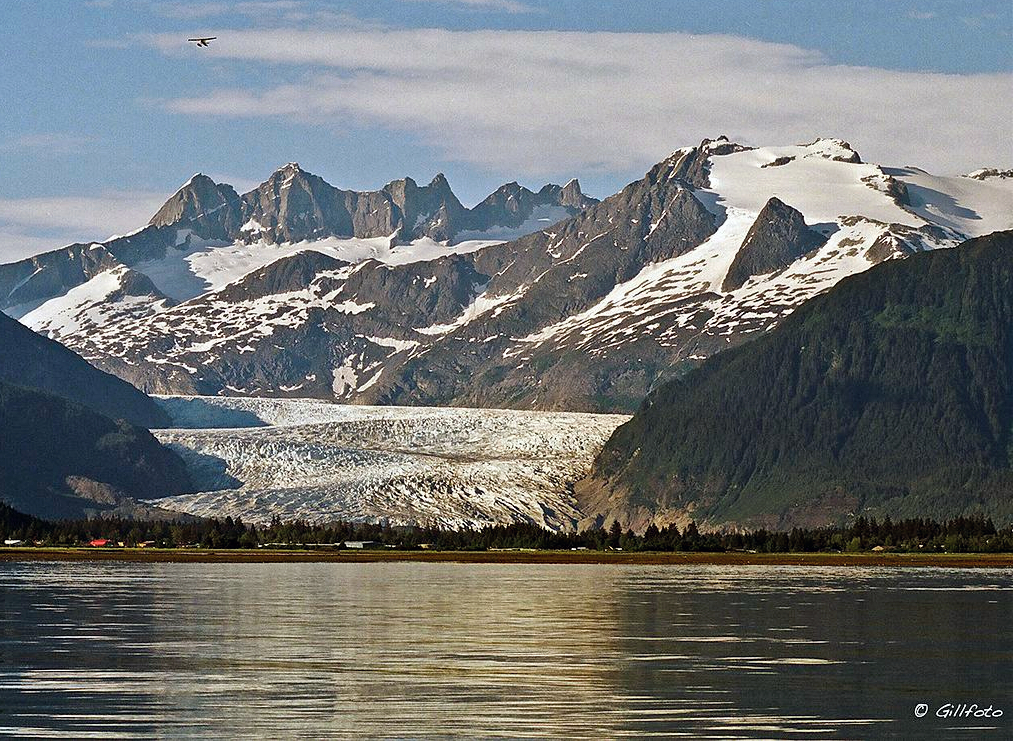
- Mount Wrather (right) seen with Mendenhall Glacier and Mendenhall Towers

Highest point
- Elevation: 5,968 ft (1,819 m)
- Prominence: 1,268 ft (386 m)
- Parent peak: Mendenhall Towers
- Coordinates: 58°29′23″N 134°29′02″W

Geography
- Location within Alaska
- Interactive map of Mount Wrather
- Location: Tongass National Forest; Juneau Borough; Alaska, United States
- Parent range: Coast Mountains; Boundary Ranges; Juneau Icefield
- Topo map: USGS Juneau B-2

Climbing
- Easiest route: Mountaineering

Mount Wrather is a 5,968-foot (1,819 m) mountain summit located in the Boundary Ranges, in the U.S. state of Alaska. The peak is situated within Tongass National Forest, immediately east of the Mendenhall Glacier, 12 mi (19 km) north of Juneau, Alaska, and 9 mi (14 km) north of Juneau International Airport. Although modest in elevation, relief is significant since the mountain rises up from sea-level at Auke Bay in less than nine miles. The mountain's name was officially adopted in 1968 by the USGS to honor William Embry Wrather (1883–1963), the 6th Director of the United States Geological Survey from 1943 to 1956.

== Climate ==
Based on the Köppen climate classification, Mount Wrather is located in a subarctic climate zone with cold, snowy winters, and mild summers. Temperatures can drop below −20 °C with wind chill factors below −30 °C. This climate supports the Mendenhall Glacier on its west aspect, and Juneau Icefield to the mountain's northeast. June and July are the best months for climbing in terms of catching favorable weather.

== Gallery ==
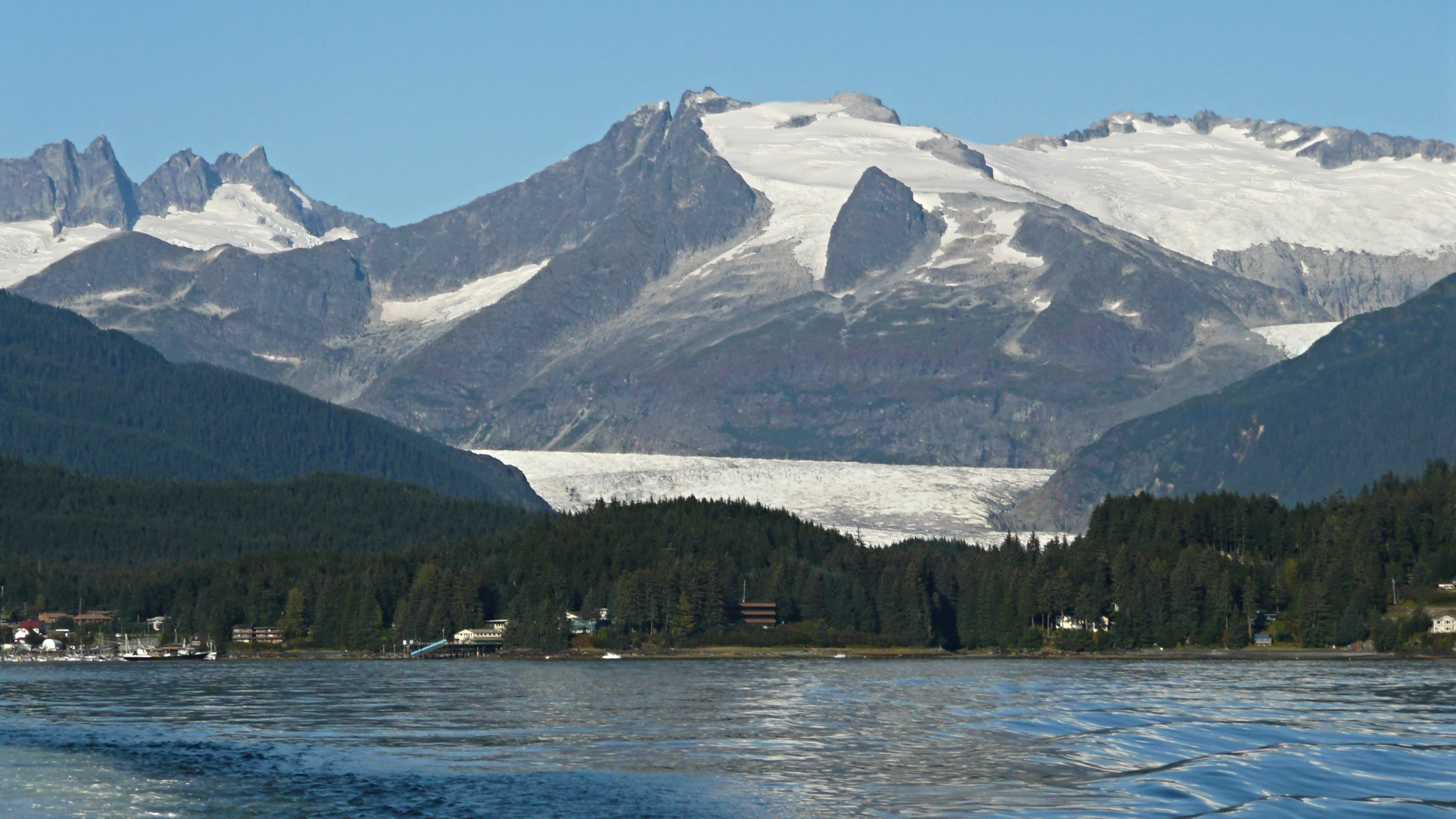
Mount Wrather

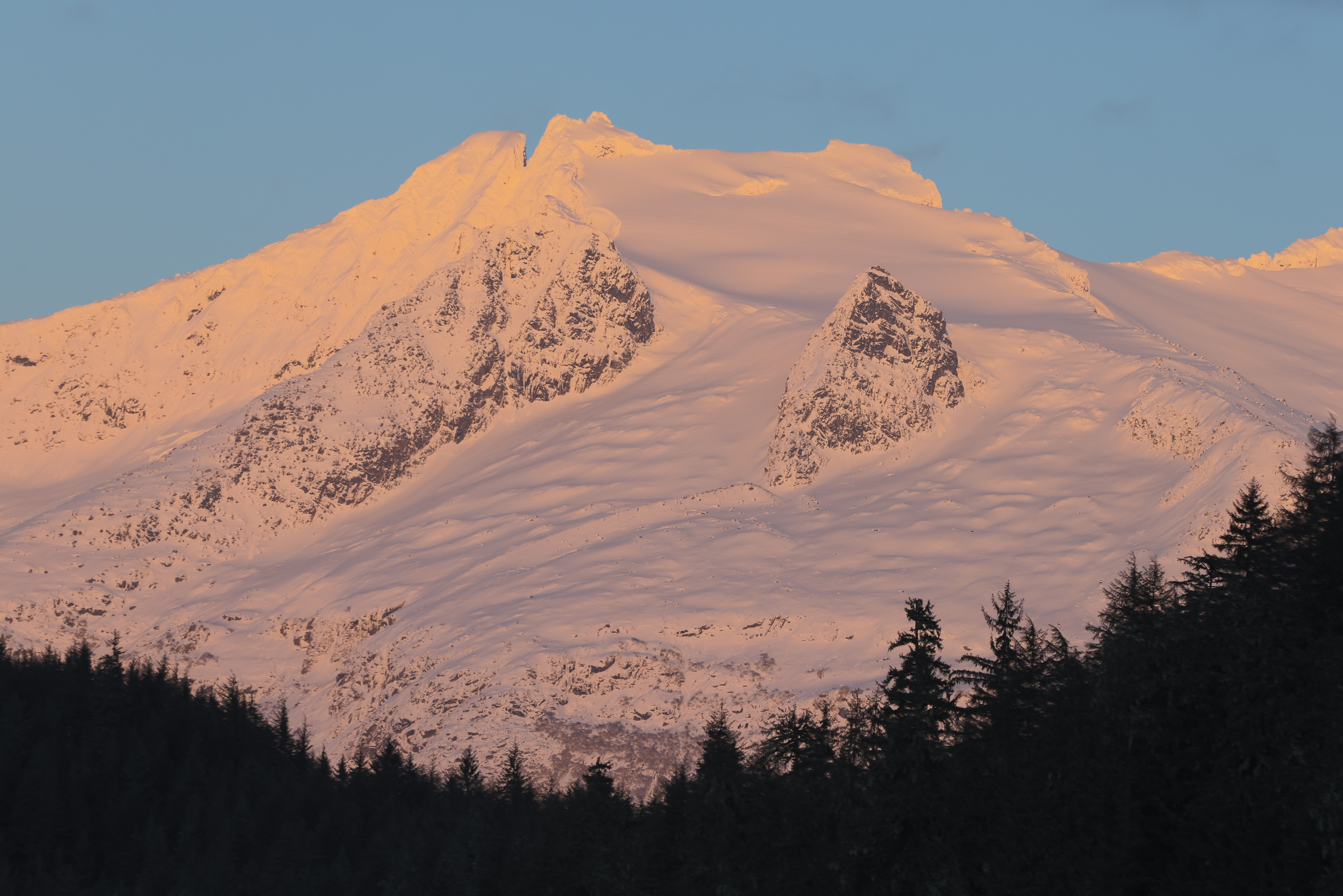
Mount Wrather

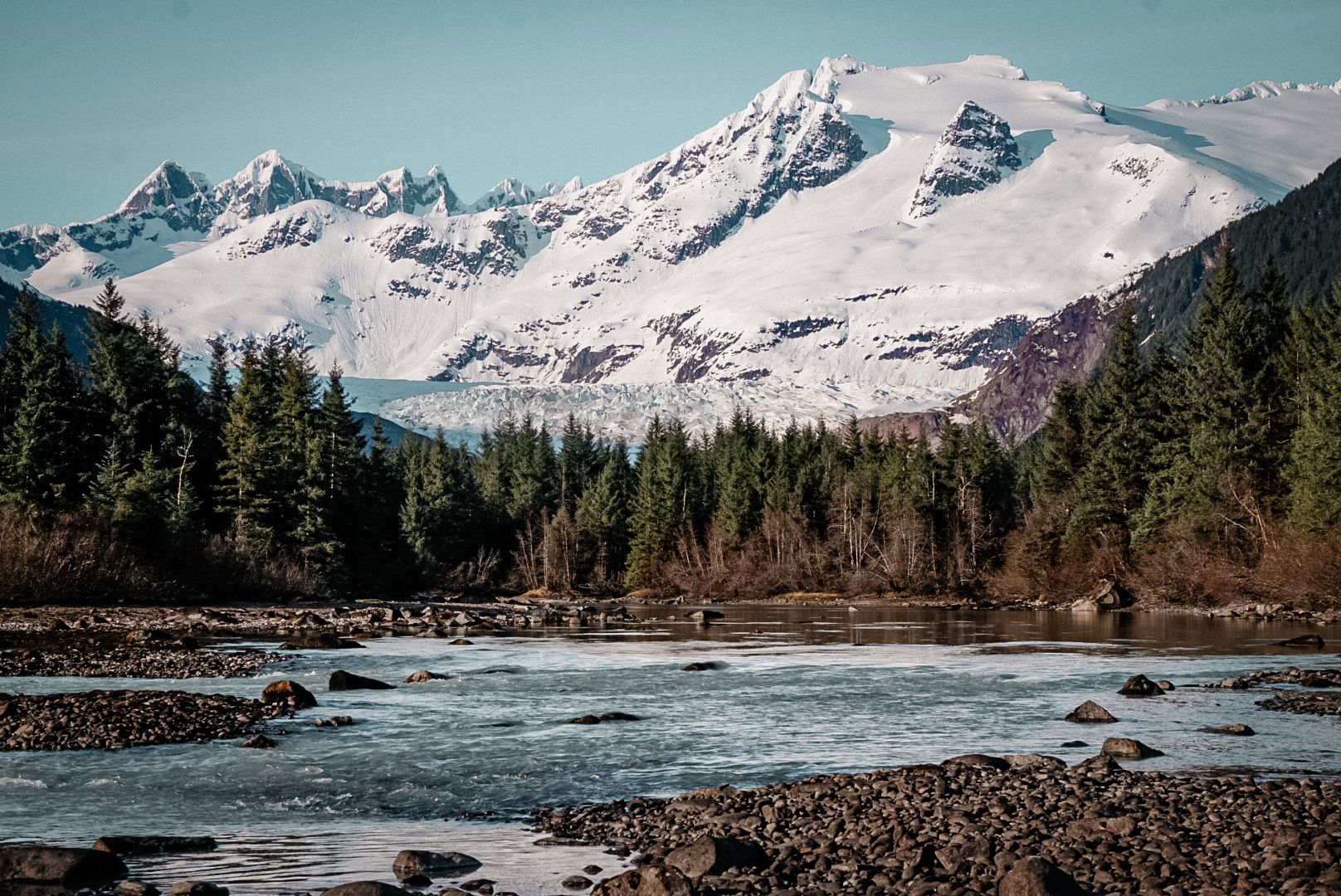
Mount Wrather

== See also ==
- List of mountain peaks of Alaska
- Geography of Alaska
- Bullard Mountain
