= Nugget Falls =

Alaskan waterfall

- Nugget Falls in the summer
- Interactive map of Nugget Falls
- Location: East of Mendenhall Glacier, Auke Bay, Alaska
- Coordinates: 58.4272°N 134.5367°W
- Type: Cascade and Fan
- Total height: 377 feet (115 m)
- Number of drops: 2
- Longest drop: 278 feet (85 m)
- Total width: 100 feet (30 m)
- Watercourse: Nugget Creek
- Average flow rate: Perennial

Nugget Falls, also known as Nugget Creek Falls or Mendenhall Glacier Falls, is a waterfall downstream of the Nugget Glacier, at the base of Bullard Mountain, in the U.S. state of Alaska. Formed by the creek from the Nugget Glacier, the waterfall drops 377 feet (115 m) in two tiers of 99 feet (30 m) and 278 feet (85 m) onto a sandbar in Mendenhall Lake, which is the freshwater pool at the face of the Mendenhall Glacier. The lake then drains via Mendenhall River into the Inside Passage. The waterfall is fed by Nugget Creek, which is in turn fed by the Nugget Glacier, a tributary glacier on the mountainside east of Auke Bay. The creek cascades down towards Mendenhall Lake, forming a hanging valley, then plunges over the falls to the lake. Prior to the recession of Mendenhall Glacier, it was said that the falls would drop "directly on the glacier", or that the "glacier covered the waterfall".

== See also ==
- List of waterfalls
- List of waterfalls in Alaska
