= Stroller White Mountain =

Mountain in Alaska, United States

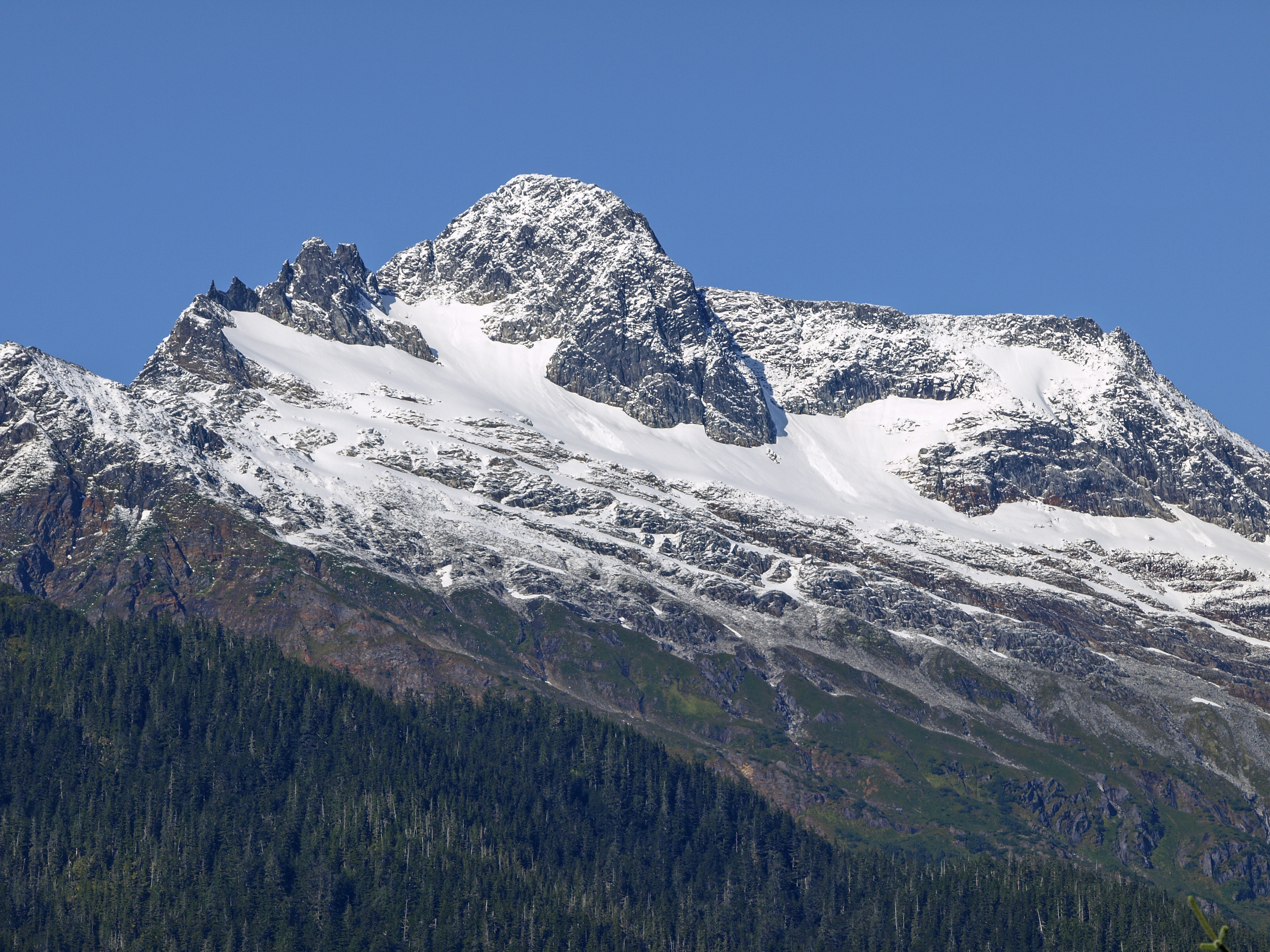
- Stroller White Mountain

Highest point
- Elevation: 5,118 ft (1,560 m)
- Prominence: 1,443 ft (440 m)
- Coordinates: 58°28′23″N 134°34′49″W

Geography
- Location within Alaska
- Interactive map of Stroller White Mountain
- Location: Tongass National Forest; Juneau Borough; Alaska, United States
- Parent range: Coast Mountains; Boundary Ranges; Juneau Icefield
- Topo map: USGS Juneau B-2

Stroller White Mountain, also known as Mount Stroller White, is a 5,118-foot (1,560 m) mountain summit located in the Boundary Ranges, in the U.S. state of Alaska. The peak is situated near the toe of the Mendenhall Glacier, within Tongass National Forest, 12 mi (19 km) north-northwest of Juneau, Alaska, and 8 mi (13 km) north of Juneau International Airport. Although modest in elevation, relief is significant since the mountain rises up from sea-level in less than seven miles. Stroller White Mountain is often seen and photographed with McGinnis Mountain, a 4,199-foot (1,280 m) summit 1.6 mi (3 km) south, because they are together in the background behind Mendenhall Lake, a popular tourist and recreation area.

== E. J. "Stroller" White ==
The mountain's name was officially adopted in 1931 by the United States Geological Survey to honor Elmer John "Stroller" White (1859-1930), one of the most famous editors and publishers of the Territory of Alaska. He was living in Washington state when news broke of the gold strikes in the Klondike in 1898. He followed the rush north, where he worked for the Skagway News and wrote accounts about Soapy Smith's gang including the Shootout on Juneau Wharf. The powerful lure of the goldfields drew him to Dawson, Yukon, where he wrote a column called "The Stroller by E.J. White" which earned him the nickname "Stroller". From 1904 until 1916, Stroller White was editor of the Whitehorse Star. In 1917 he moved to the Juneau area where he published the Strollers Weekly. In 1918 he was appointed Chief of the Territorial Bureau of Publicity, and later served as Speaker of the Territorial House of Representatives.

== Climate ==
Based on the Köppen climate classification, Stroller White Mountain is located in a subarctic climate zone with cold, wet winters, and cold summers. Weather systems coming off the Gulf of Alaska are forced upwards by the Coast Mountains (orographic lift), causing heavy precipitation in the form of rainfall and snowfall. Temperatures can drop below −10 °C with wind chill factors below −46 °C. This climate supports the Mendenhall Glacier and Juneau Icefield to the mountain's east. The months May through July offer the most favorable weather for viewing and climbing.

== Gallery ==
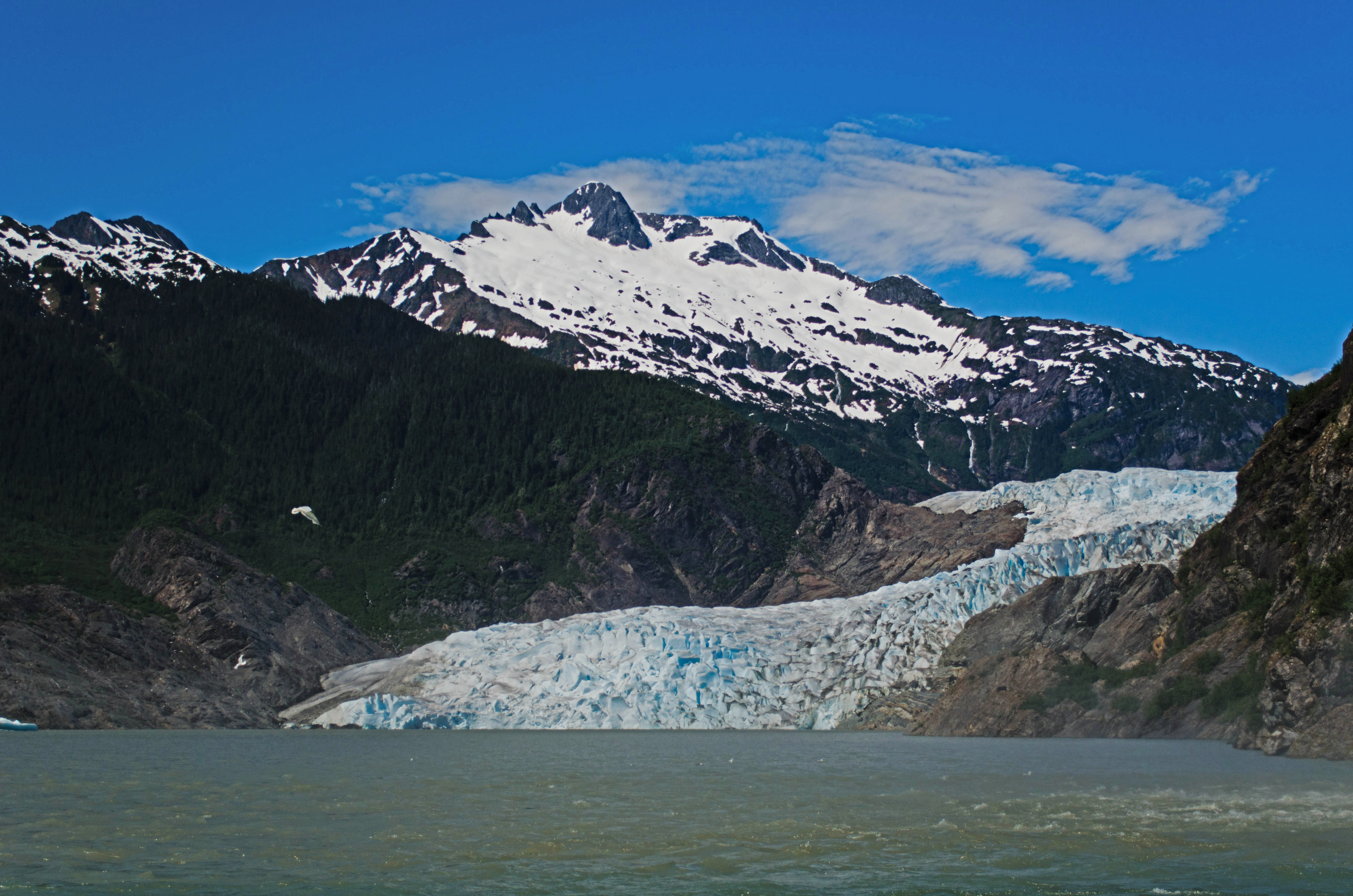
Stroller White Mountain

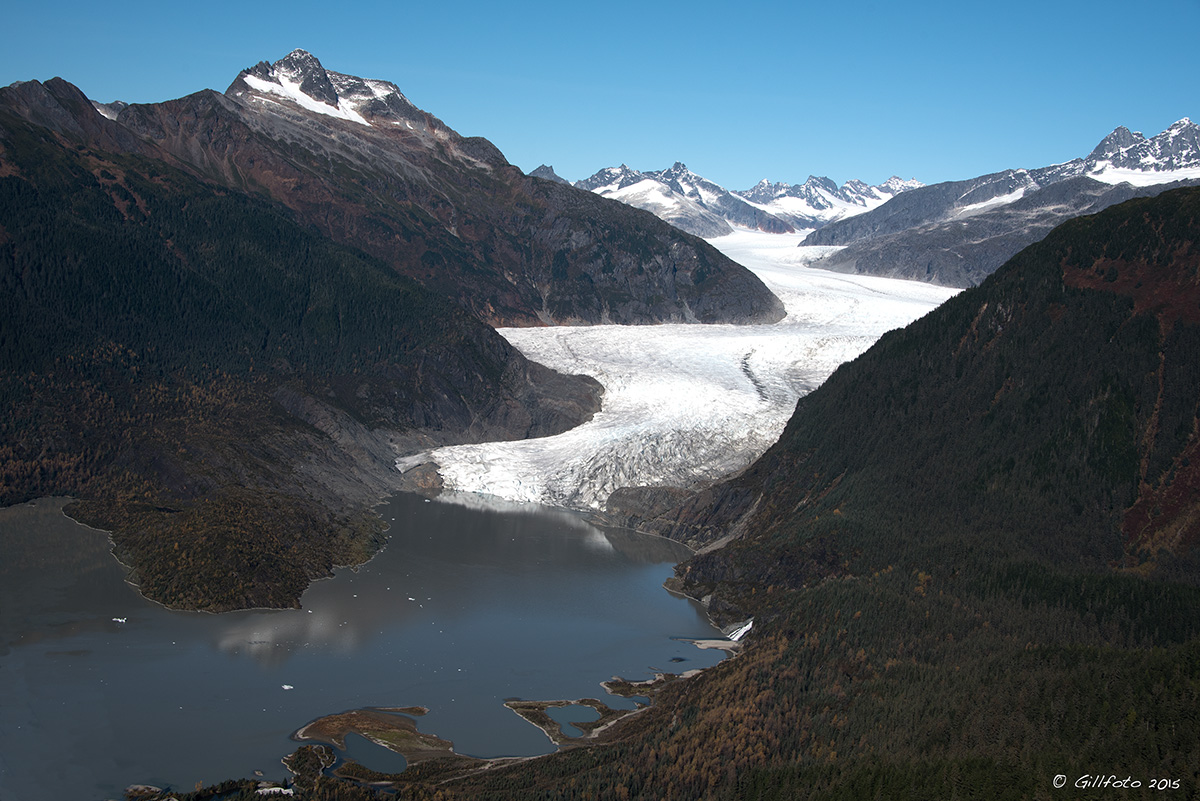
Aerial of Stroller White (left) with Mendenhall Glacier

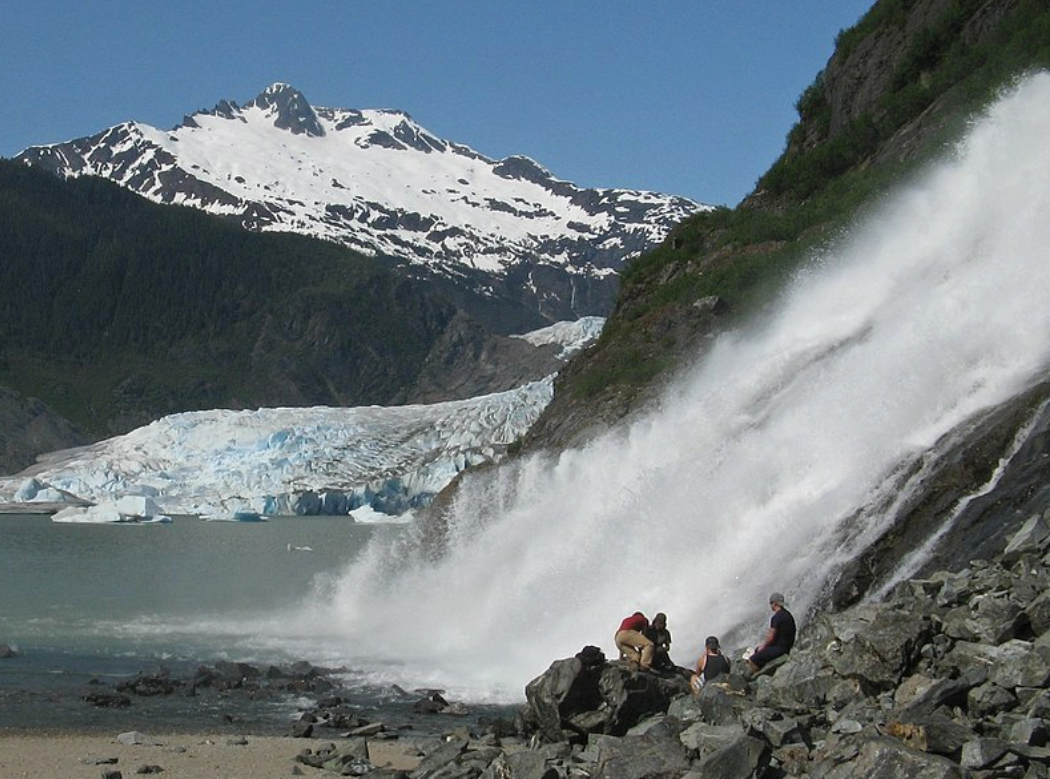
Stroller White with Nugget Falls

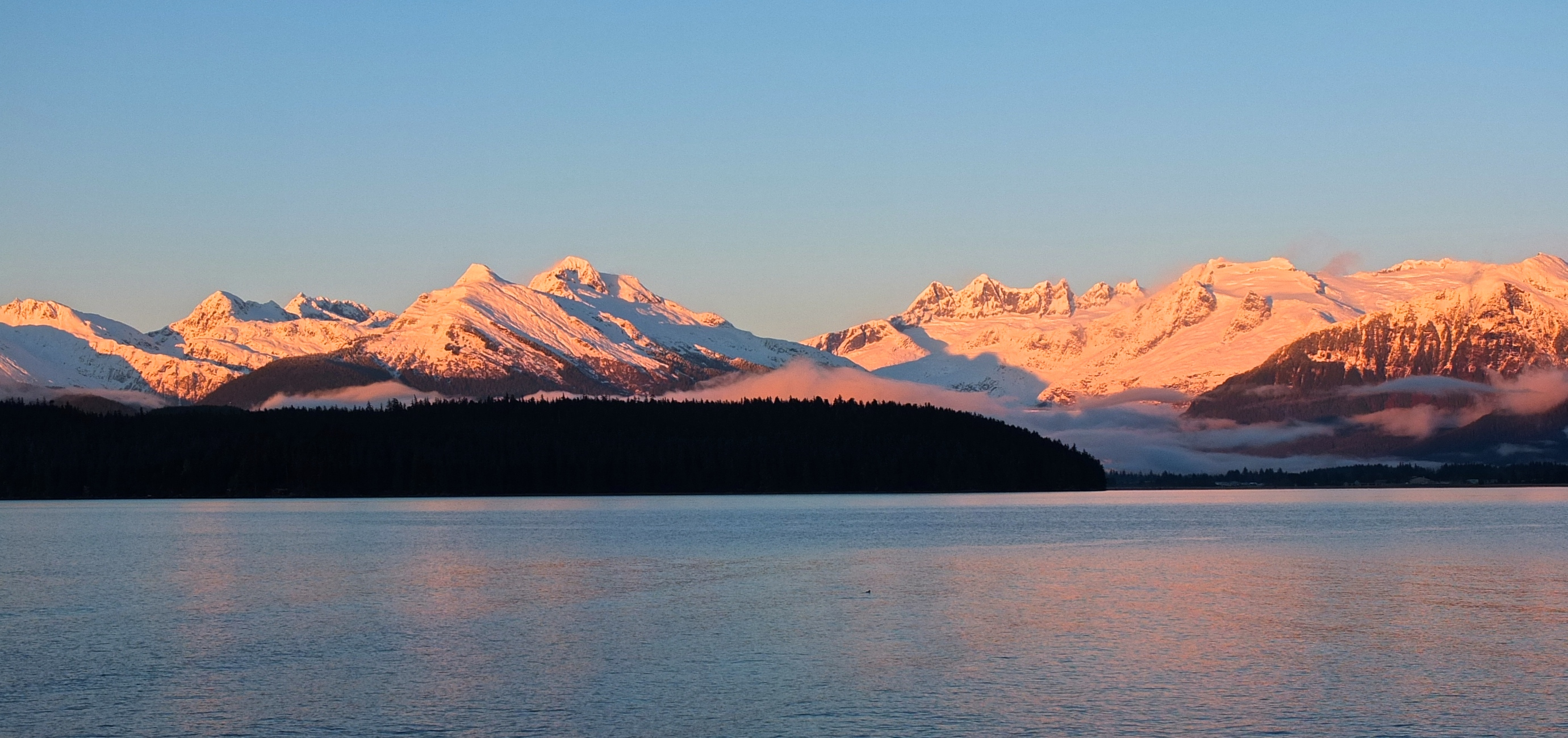
Mt. Stroller White is first peak to left of center

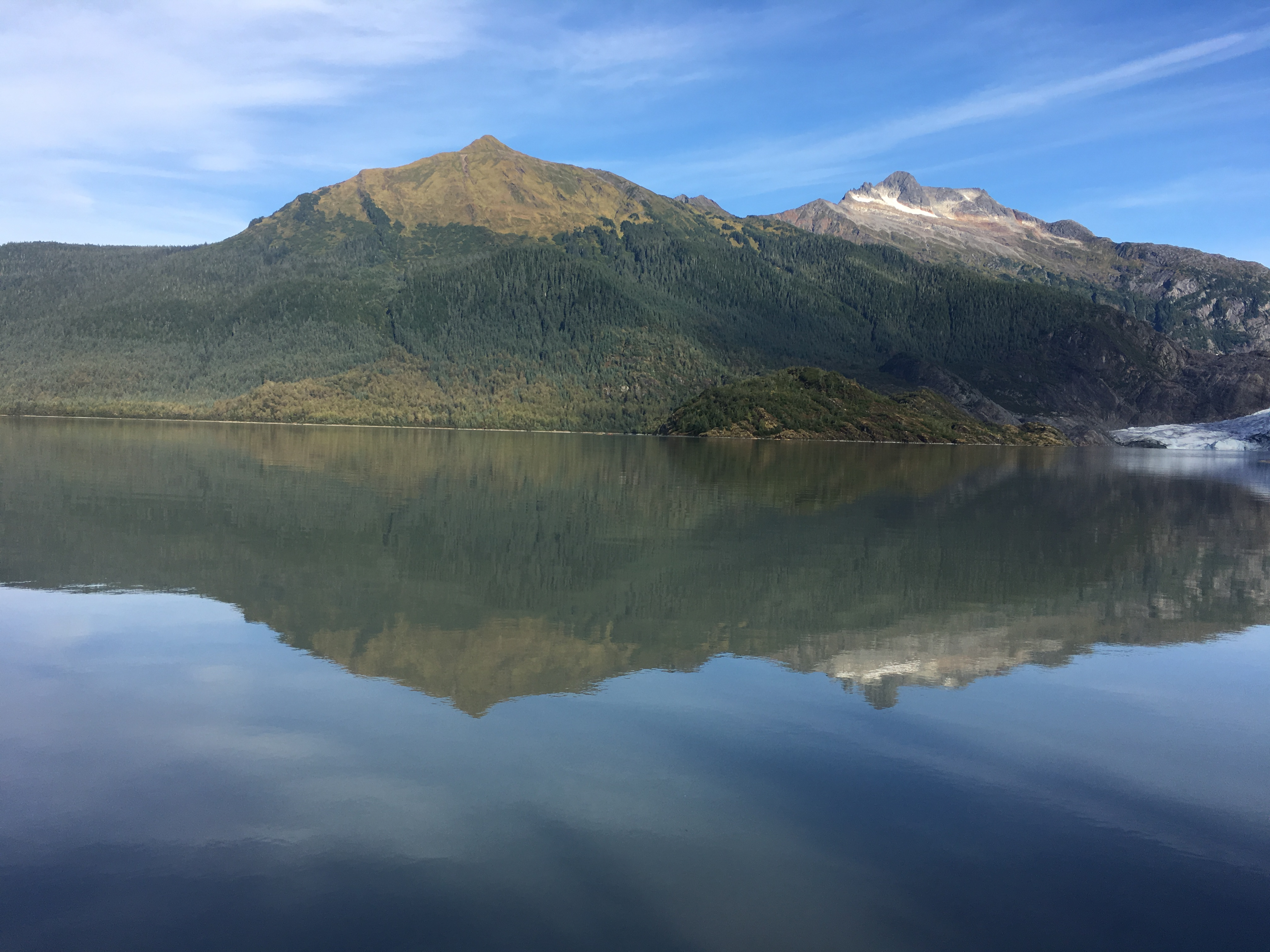
McGinnis Mountain and Stroller White (right)

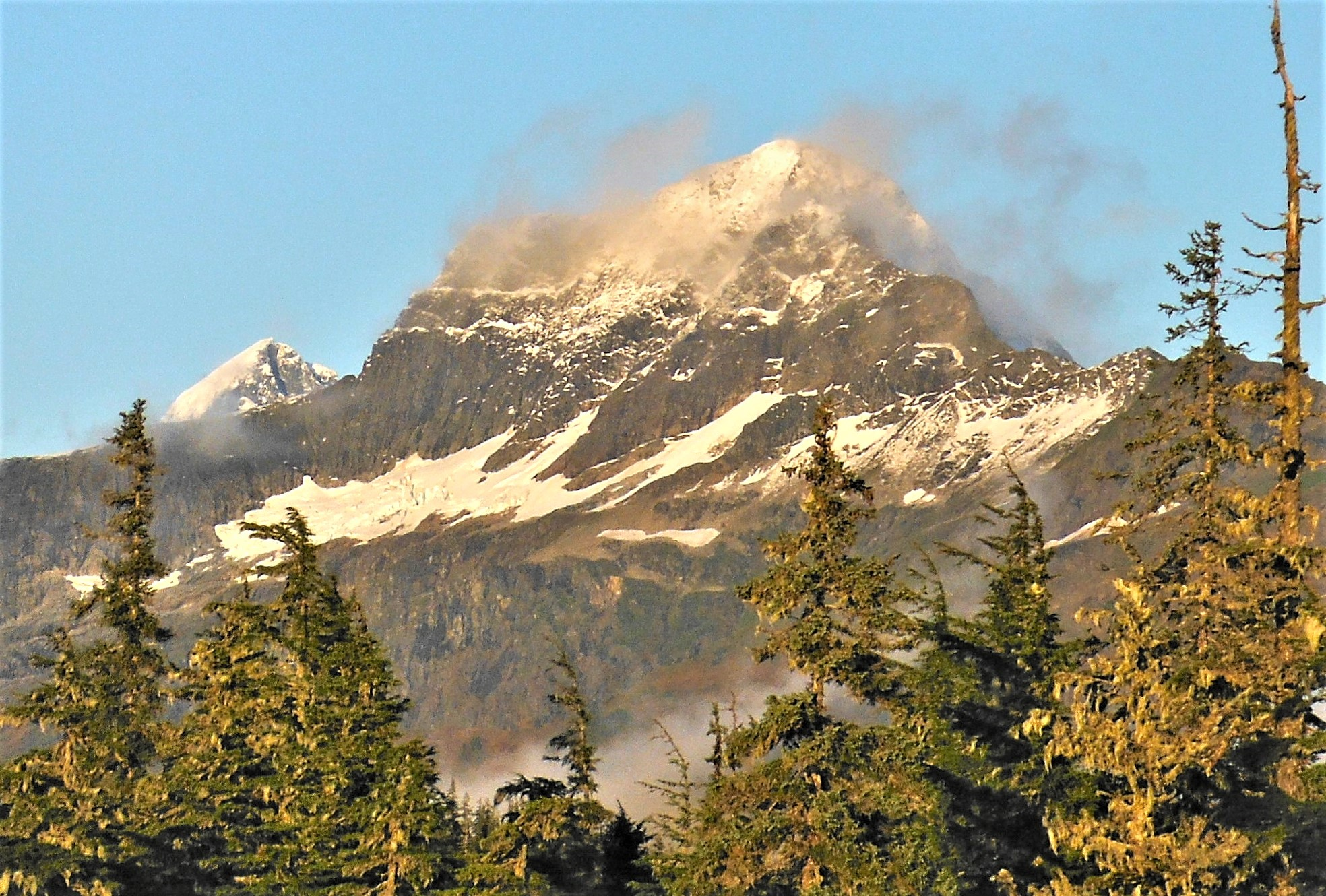
Southwest aspect

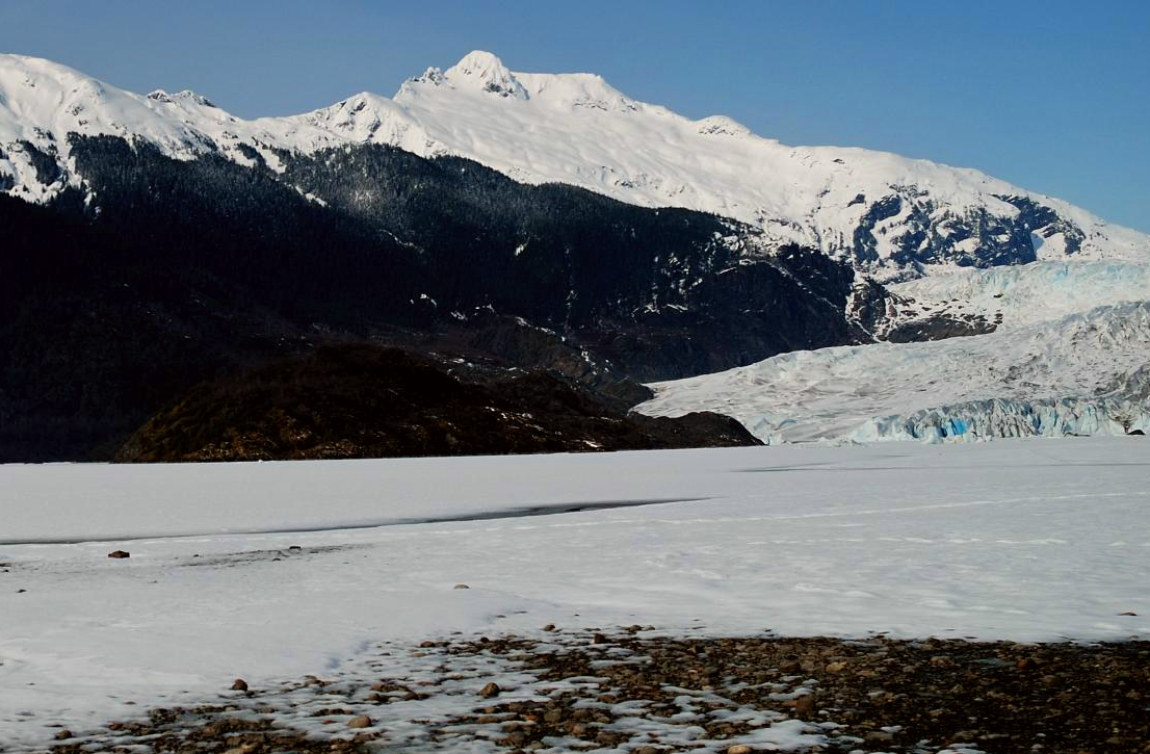

== See also ==
- List of mountain peaks of Alaska
- Geography of Alaska
