= Heintzleman Ridge =

Mountain ridge in Alaska, United States

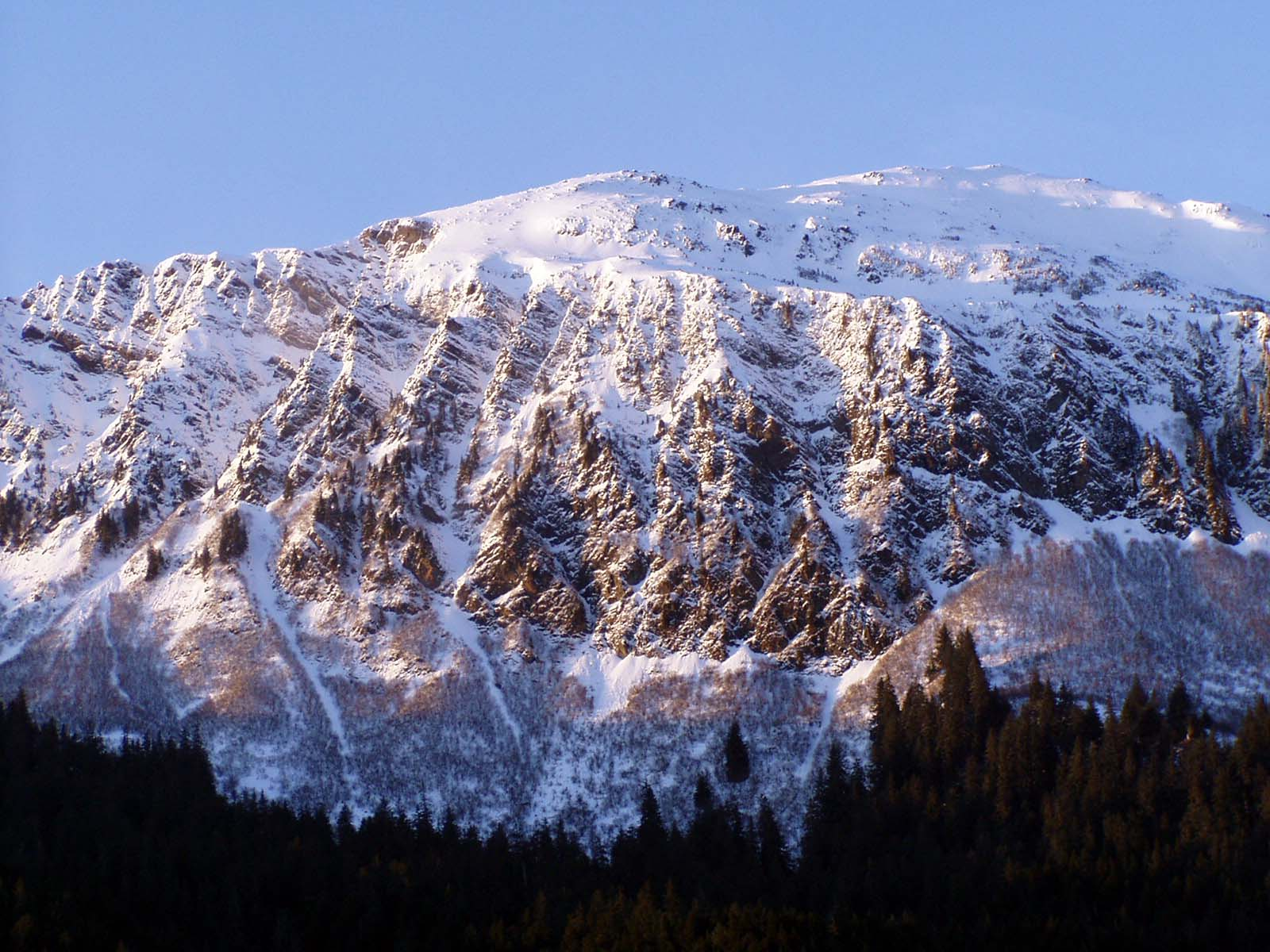
- Heintzleman Ridge, south aspect

Highest point
- Elevation: 3,940 ft (1,200 m)
- Prominence: 690 ft (210 m)
- Parent peak: Bullard Mountain
- Isolation: 2.76 mi (4.44 km)
- Coordinates: 58°23′56″N 134°27′47″W

Geography
- Location within Alaska
- Interactive map of Heintzleman Ridge
- Location: Tongass National Forest; Juneau Borough; Alaska, United States
- Parent range: Coast Mountains; Boundary Ranges; Juneau Icefield
- Topo map: USGS Juneau B-2

Climbing
- Easiest route: Hiking 3 mile trail

Heintzleman Ridge is a 3,940-foot (1,201 m) elevation mountain ridge located in the Boundary Ranges, in the U.S. state of Alaska. This seven-miles-long ridge, which trends southwest to northeast from Gastineau Channel to Nugget Mountain, is situated 8 mi (13 km) north of Juneau, on land managed by Tongass National Forest. Juneau International Airport lies below the southwest tip of this ridge. Although modest in elevation, relief is significant since the ridge rises from sea-level in less than two miles, and it's set between Lemon Creek and Mendenhall Valley. Its nearest higher neighbor is Bullard Mountain, 2.75 mi (4 km) to the north. Heintzleman Ridge is named for B. Frank Heintzleman (1888–1965), an American forester who was appointed Governor of Alaska Territory, from 1953 through 1957. In a way, he chose his own memorial, once casually remarking that, if anything were ever named for him, he hoped it would be "that ridge" which he admired for its beauty and splendor. This geographic feature's name was officially adopted in 1966 by the United States Board on Geographic Names.

== Climate ==
Based on the Köppen climate classification, Heintzleman Ridge is located in a subarctic climate zone with cold, snowy winters, and mild summers. Weather systems coming off the Gulf of Alaska are forced upwards by the Coast Mountains (orographic lift), causing heavy precipitation in the form of rainfall and snowfall. Temperatures can drop below −20 °C with wind chill factors below −30 °C. This climate supports the Juneau Icefield to the mountain's northeast. The month of July offers the most favorable weather for viewing and hiking this ridge.

== Gallery ==
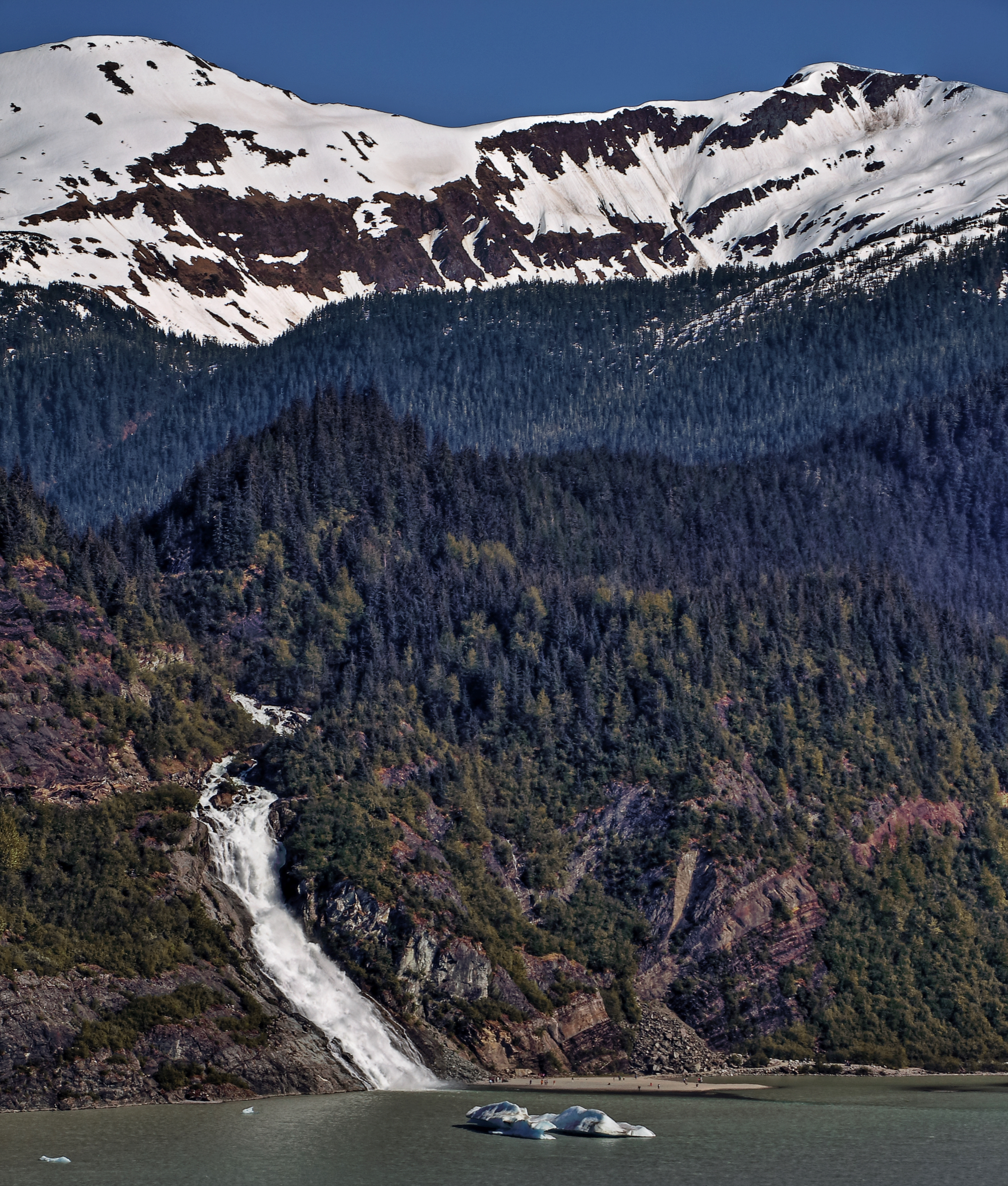
Heintzleman Ridge and Nugget Falls

== See also ==
- List of mountain peaks of Alaska
- Geography of Alaska
