= Mendenhall Glacier =

Glacier in the United States

- Áakʼw Tʼáak Sítʼ (Tlingit)
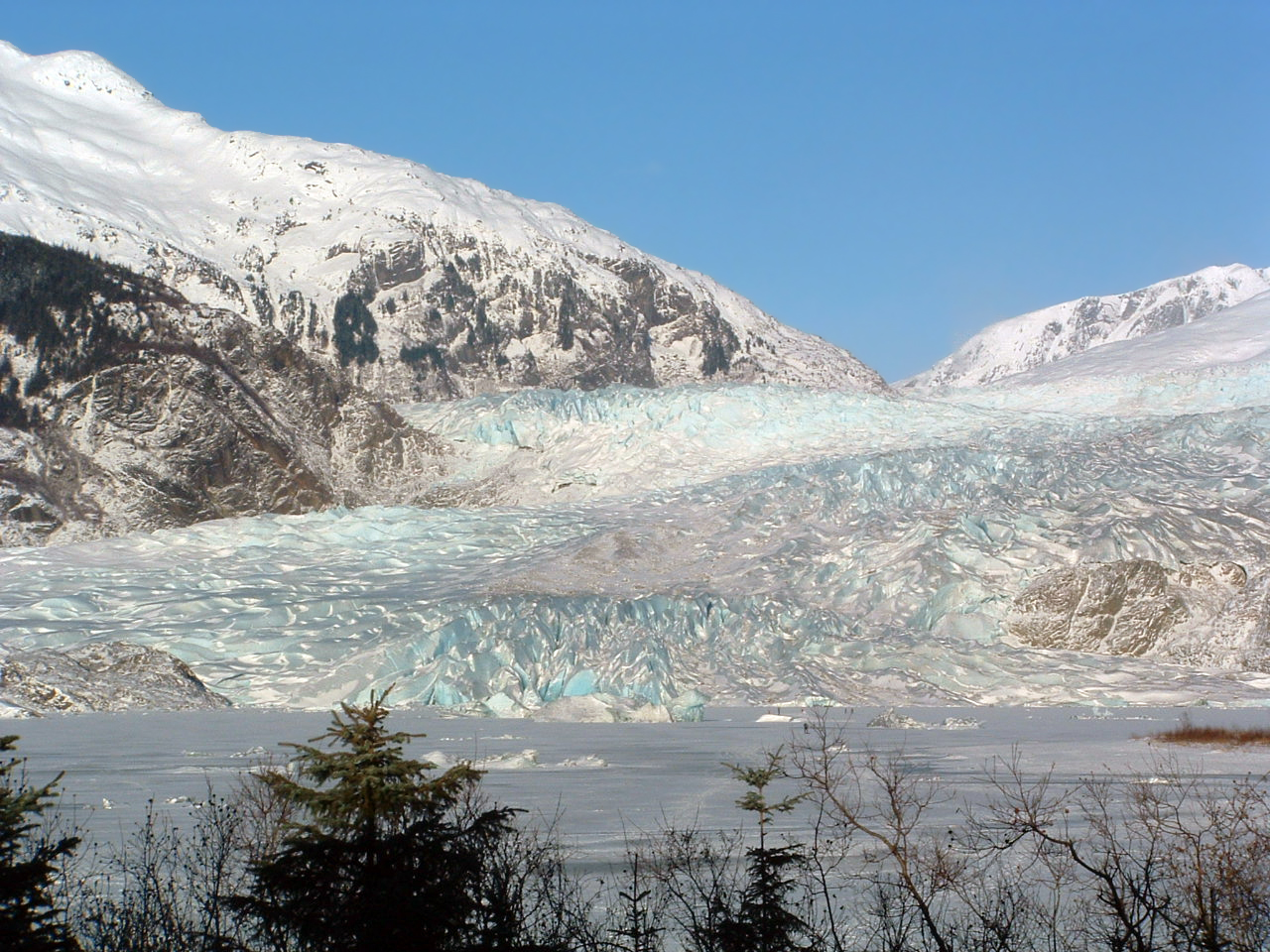
- Mendenhall Glacier and frozen Mendenhall Lake

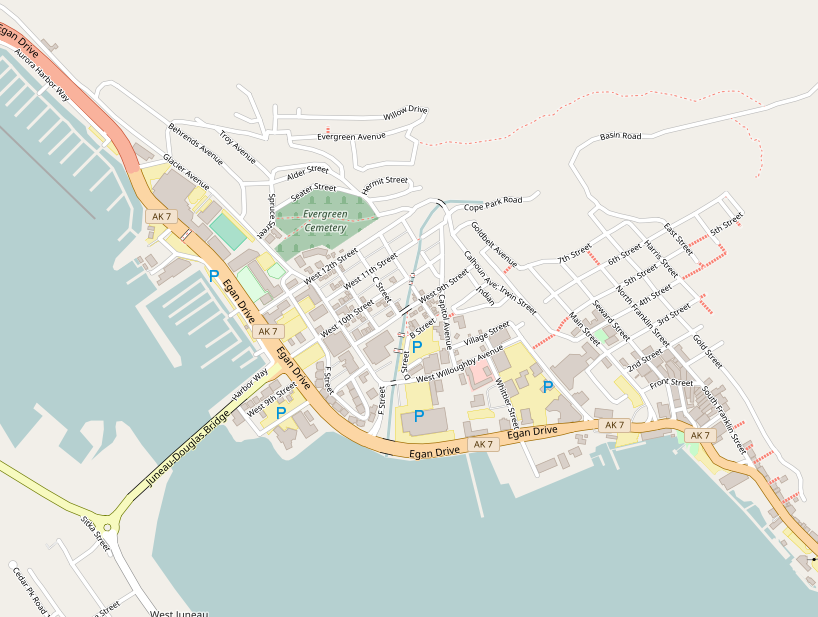
- Location within Juneau Location within Alaska
- Interactive map of Mendenhall Glacier
- Type: Mountain glacier
- Location: Coast Range, Juneau, Alaska, U.S.
- Coordinates: 58°29′45″N 134°31′56″W
- Terminus: Proglacial lake
- Status: Retreating

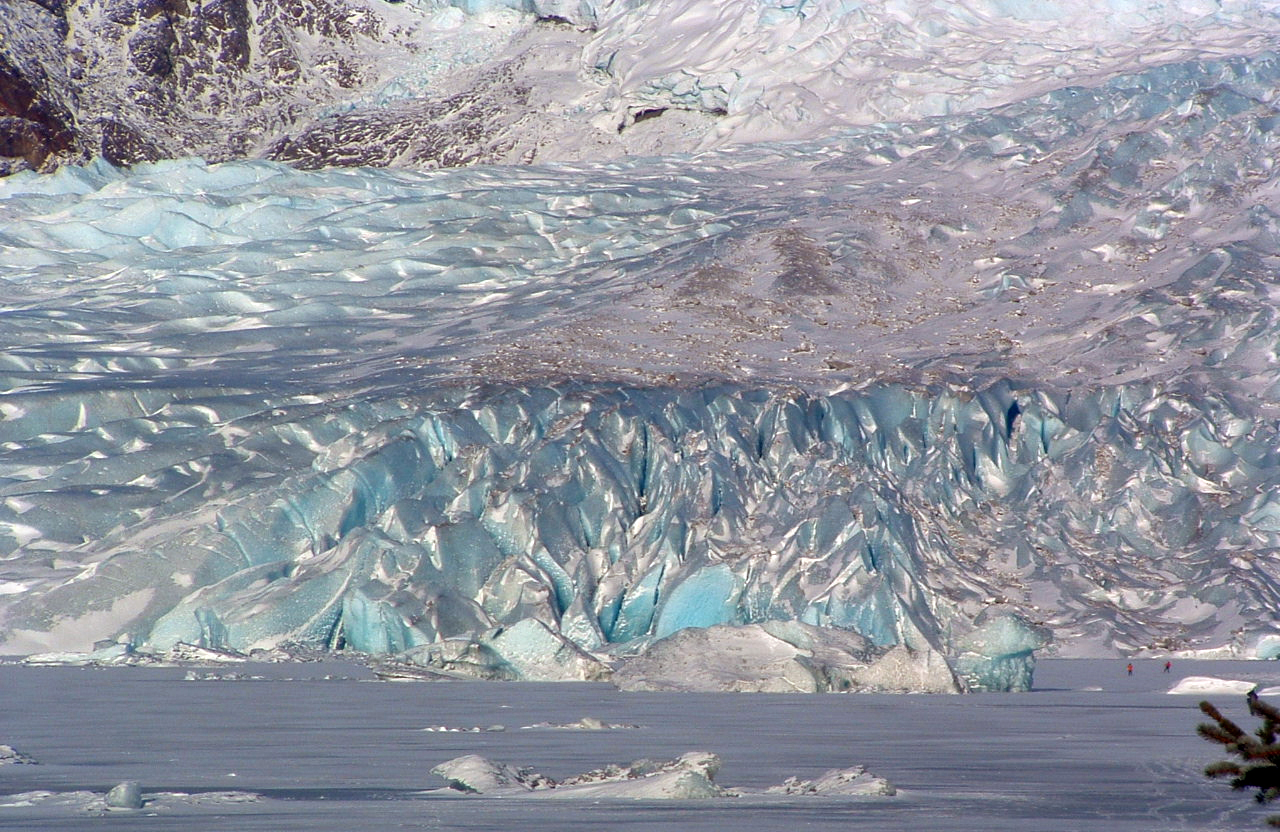
Closer view of the glacier in the winter

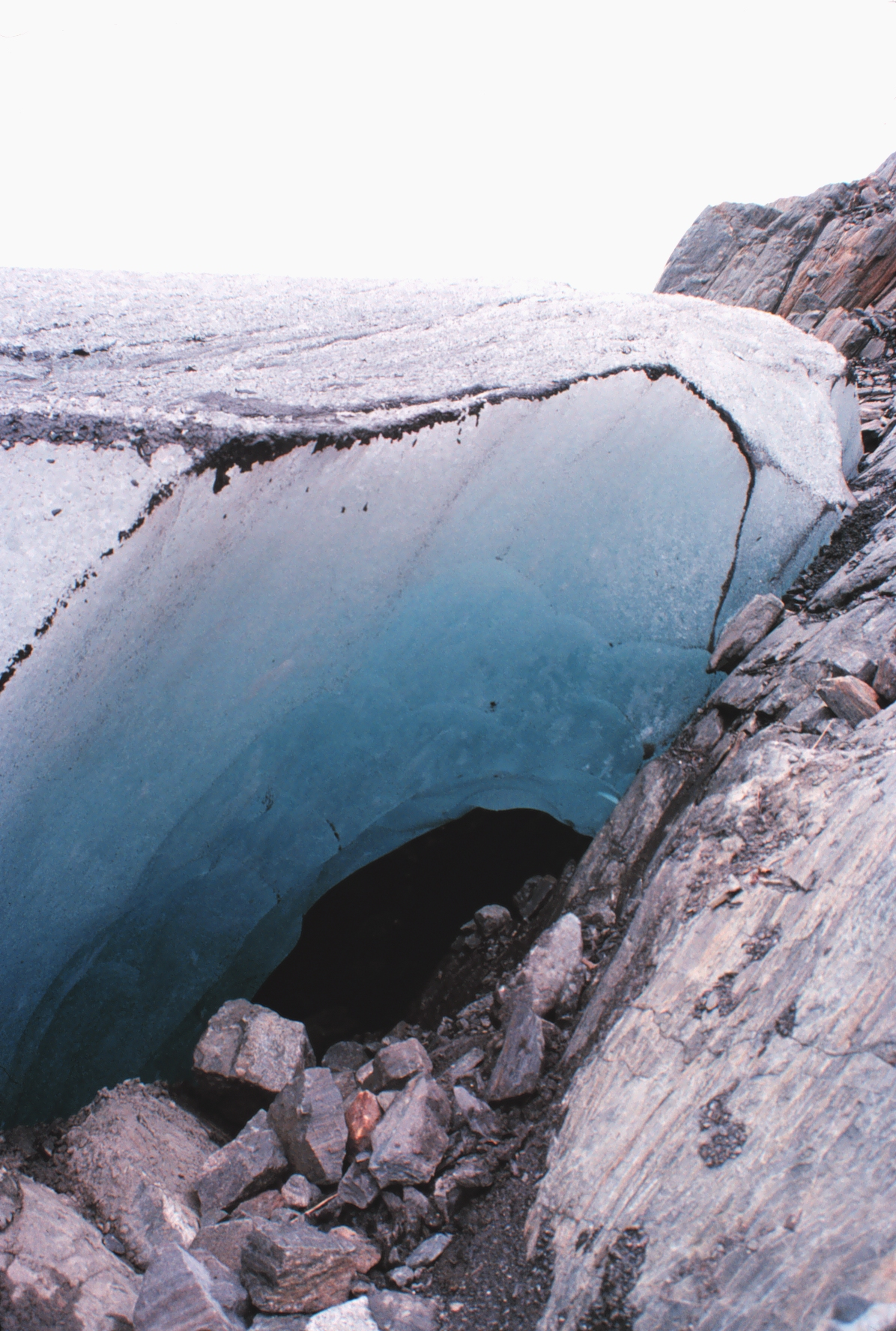
A glacier cave under Mendenhall Glacier

Mendenhall Glacier (Tlingit: Áakʼw Tʼáak Sítʼ) is a glacier about 13.6 miles (21.9 km) long located in Mendenhall Valley, about 12 miles (19 km) from downtown Juneau in the southeast area of the U.S. state of Alaska. The glacier and surrounding landscape are protected as part of the 5,815 acres (2,353 ha) Mendenhall Glacier Recreation Area, a federally designated unit of the Tongass National Forest.

The Juneau Icefield Research Program has monitored the outlet glaciers of the Juneau Icefield since 1942, including Mendenhall Glacier. The glacier has retreated 1.75 miles (2.82 km) since 1929, when Mendenhall Lake was created, and over 2.5 miles (4.0 km) since 1500. The end of the glacier currently has a negative glacier mass balance and will continue to retreat in the foreseeable future.

Given that average yearly temperatures are currently increasing, and the outlook is for this trend to continue, it is actually possible that the glacier might experience a period of stabilization or slight advance during its retreating march. This is because increasing amounts of warm, moist air will be carried up to the head of the icefield, where colder ambient temperatures will cause it to precipitate as snow. The increased amount of snow will feed the icefield, possibly enough to offset the continually increasing melting experienced at the glacier's terminus. However, this interesting phenomenon will fade away if temperatures continue to climb, since the head of the glacier will no longer have cold enough ambient temperatures to cause snow to precipitate.

== Name ==
It was originally known as Sitaantaago ("the Glacier Behind the Town") or Aak'wtaaksit ("the Glacier Behind the Little Lake"), also Latinized as Aakwtaaksit, by the Tlingit. The glacier was named Auke (Auk) Glacier by naturalist John Muir for the Tlingit Auk Kwaan (or Aak'w Kwaan) band in 1879. In 1891 it was renamed in honor of Thomas Corwin Mendenhall. It extends from the Juneau Icefield, its source, to Mendenhall Lake.

== Flooding ==
Since 2011, periodic glacial floods have occurred from the Suicide Basin into the lake and downstream Mendenhall River. A major release in 2023 destroyed two buildings.

== Retreat ==
=== Causes ===
The glacier is retreating due to a generally warming climate in Southeast Alaska, linked to global warming driven by climate change. The US Forest Service, which manages the Mendenhall Glacier, wrote "because glaciers are a product of climate, they respond to climate change." The Mendenhall Glacier has retreated approximately 2.5 miles since its most recent maxima during the Little Ice Age in the mid-1700s. In a joint article for the Juneau Empire Geologist Cathy Connor and Geophysicist Roman Motyka, both professors of the University of Alaska said "climatic warming coupled with ice loss through iceberg calving are the reasons the Mendenhall Glacier is retreating and shrinking." In November 2025, the face of the glacier had officially retreated from Mendenhall Lake for the first time in modern history.

=== Negative effects ===
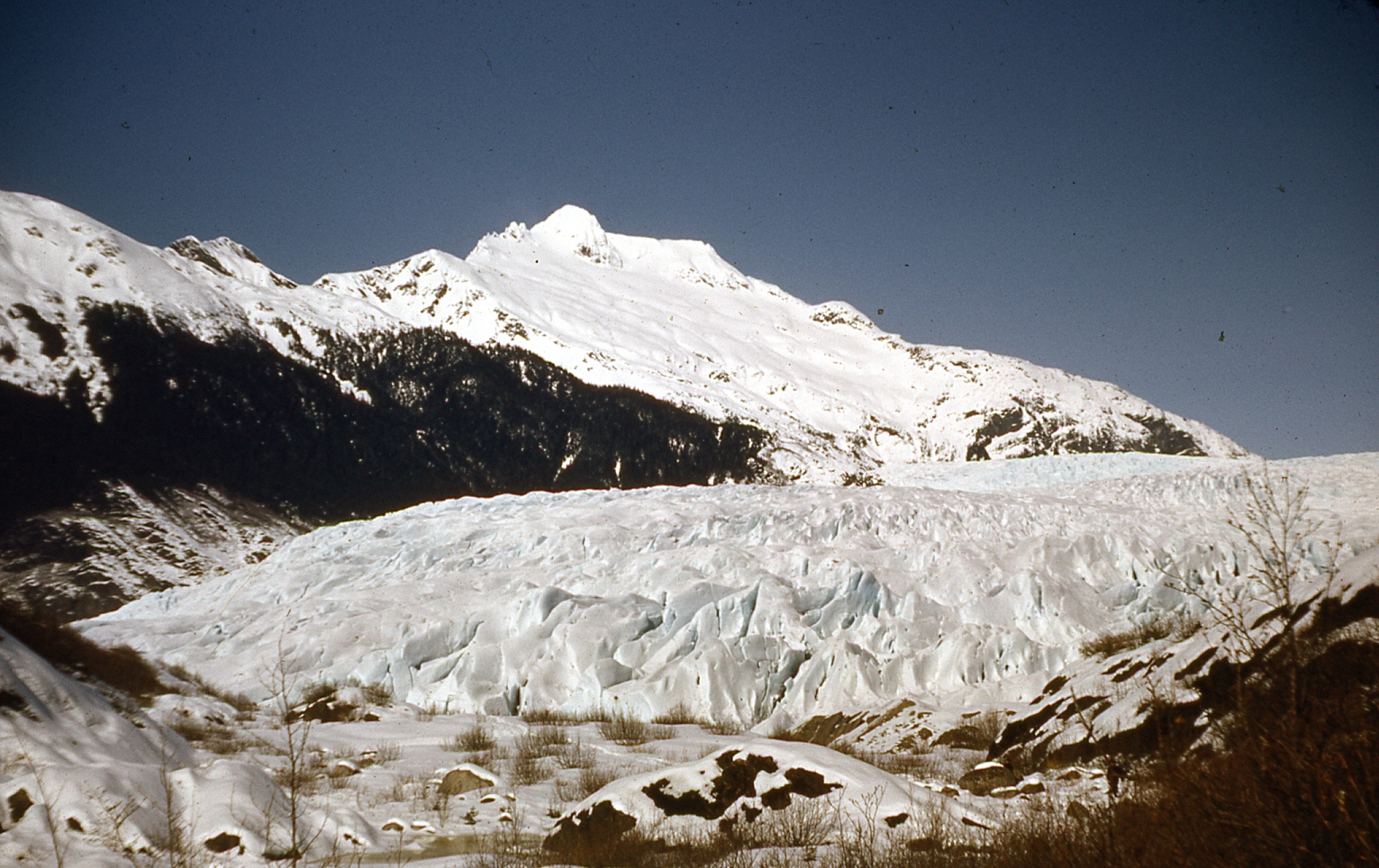
The Glacier in March, 1953 Stroller White Mountain in background

The retreat of the Mendenhall Glacier and other glaciers in the area is believed by some to be a result of broader retreat and breakup of the Juneau Icefield. The Juneau Icefield is the fifth largest icefield in North America. Many populations near glacial areas rely on the glaciers for fresh drinking water. Once these glaciers are gone these people will need another source. For example, Anchorage, the most populated city in Alaska and many people there rely on the Eklutna glacier for their freshwater. If the recession of this glacier continues they will be out of their main source of water.

=== Benefits ===
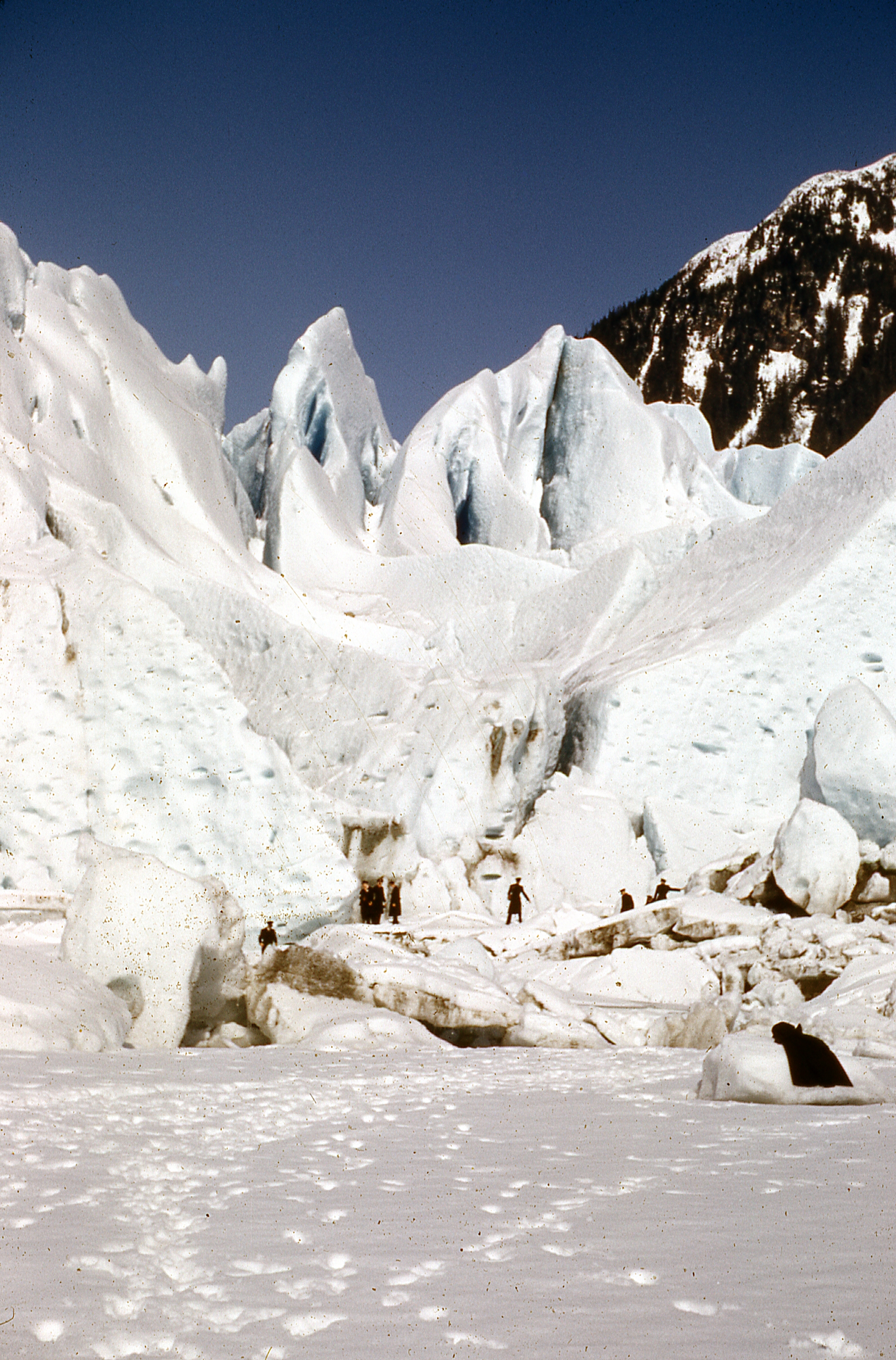
Seamen from the USS Rombach exploring the glacier in March 1953.

Although there are many negative effects of the recession of the Mendenhall Glacier and glaciers in general, there are also a few positive outcomes. With the retreat of the Mendenhall Glacier, the Mendenhall Lake has formed. The lake is a result of the run-off from the glacier and is increasing in size as the glacier continues to retreat. The lake began to form in 1929 and has continued to grow. The lake has a unique ecosystem and is a nursery for a variety of fish including several type of salmon, Dolly Varden, char, and cutthroat trout.

=== Ancient forest uncovered ===
In 2012, tree stumps and logs with attached roots and bark appeared under the retreating glacier. They are in their original growth position, preserved under what was believed to be a protective gravel layer. By uncovering them, scientists learn about the ecosystem from before the glacier formed. They can determine trees' ages when they died by looking at their preserved remains. One of the scientists, Cathy Conner, was reported as finding "The most recent stumps emerging from the Mendenhall are between 1,400 and 1,200 years old. The oldest are around 2,350 years old. Some have dated around 1,870 to 2,000 years old."

== Visitor center ==
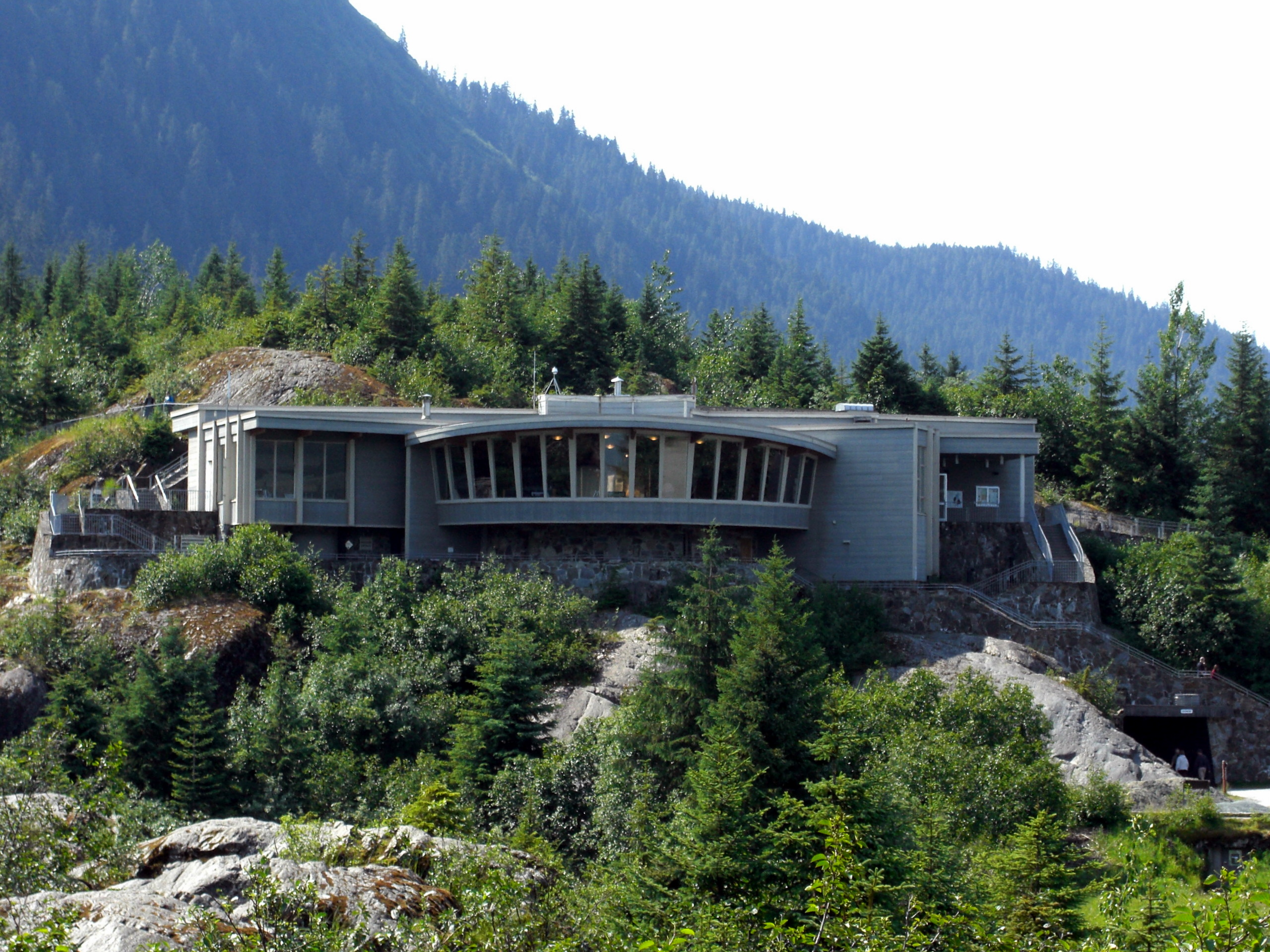
Mendenhall Glacier Visitor Center

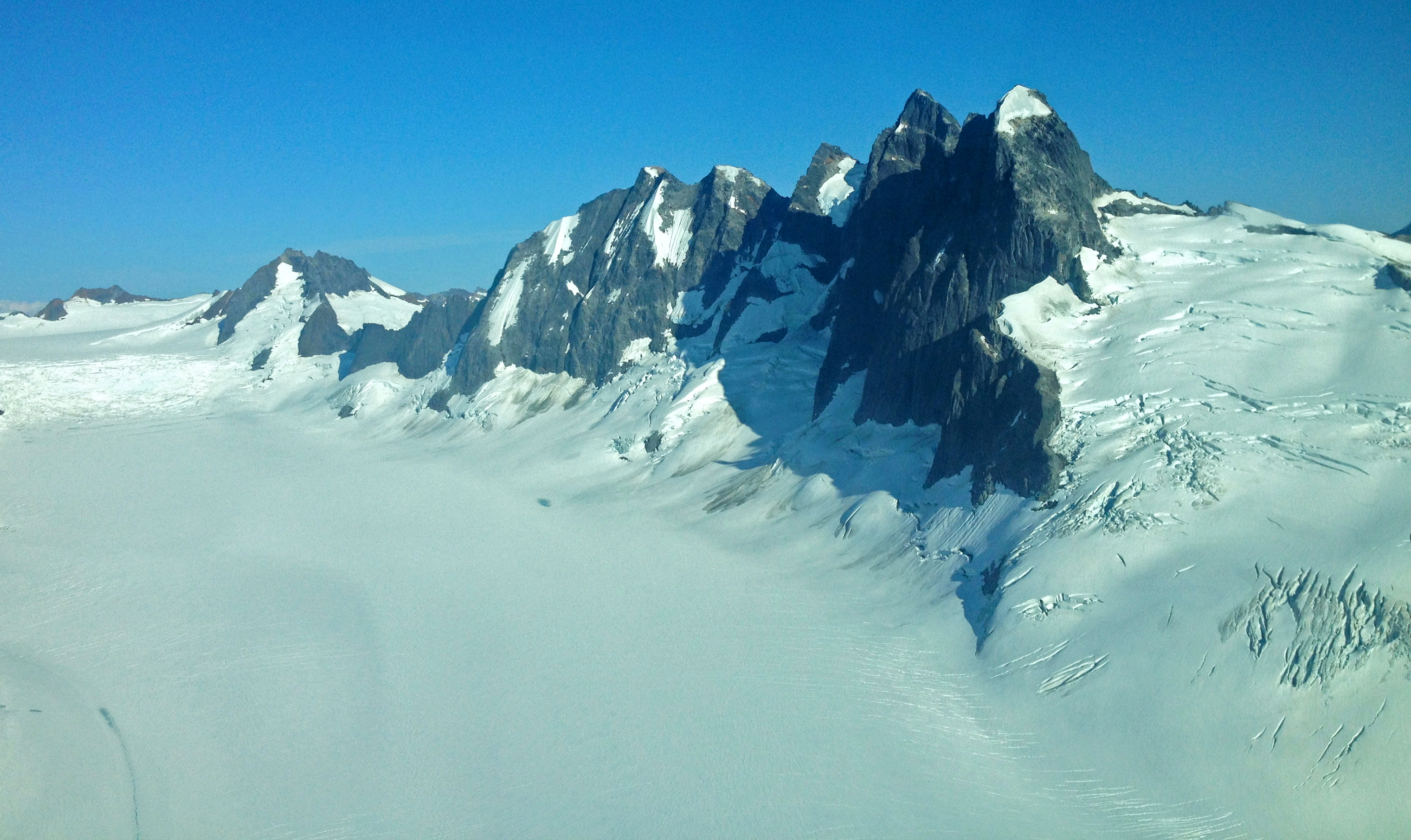
Mendenhall Towers and Glacier

The United States Forest Service operates the Mendenhall Glacier Visitor Center as part of the Tongass National Forest, offering interpretive programs throughout the year for children and adults. The Mendenhall Glacier Visitor Center and surrounding area offer views of a lake-terminating, calving glacier.

This was the first U.S. Forest Service visitor center built in the nation; it was designed by Linn A. Forrest and dedicated in 1962. The building was expanded, renovated and rededicated in 1999.

The two small parking lots have access to several trails in the area. Photo Point Trail and the Steep Creek Trail are easy and accessible trails. Elevated boardwalks above Steep Creek provide salmon and bear viewing opportunities. Visitors can hike via the East Glacier Loop to an overlook within 1 mile (1,600 m) of the glacier. Two routes traverse a series of wooden steps and a gradual elevation gain of 500 feet (150 m) on this trail. The Trail of Time, which connects to East Glacier Loop, includes historical signs and handicapped accessibility. The 0.8 miles (1,300 m) Nugget Falls Trail leads visitors to Nugget Falls, closer to the face of the glacier. Access to the outside area and trails is free. The West Glacier trail offers access to the glacier itself and the chance to view ice caves beneath it. This trail is located across the lake from the Visitor Center.

In addition to the busy summer season, the center hosts the Fireside Lecture series on Friday evenings, January through March. Programs cover ecological and cultural history, and events in Southeast Alaska.

== Romeo the wolf ==
Romeo was a wolf who lived around Mendenhall Glacier between 2003 and 2009 until he was killed by out-of-state poachers. The Visitor Center has an exhibit and taxidermy of Romeo's pelt to commemorate him and the town's love for him. Nick Jans' book, A Wolf Called Romeo, brings Romeo's life to a broader audience.

== Gallery ==
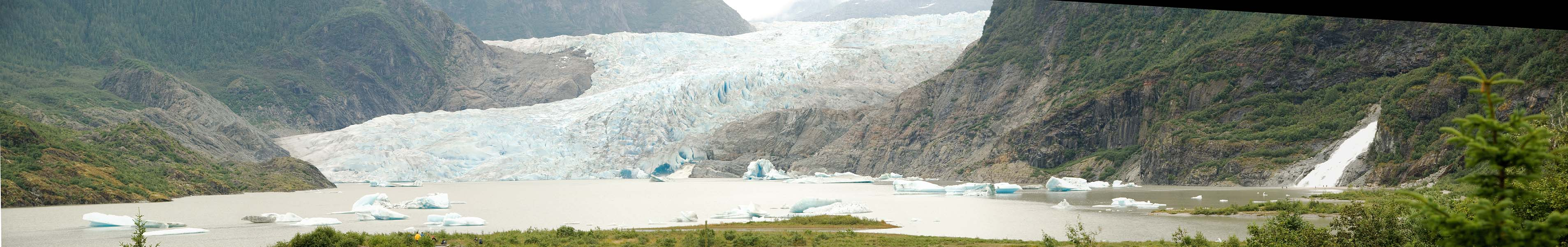
Mendenhall Glacier and Lake, with Nugget Falls on the right (August 2011)

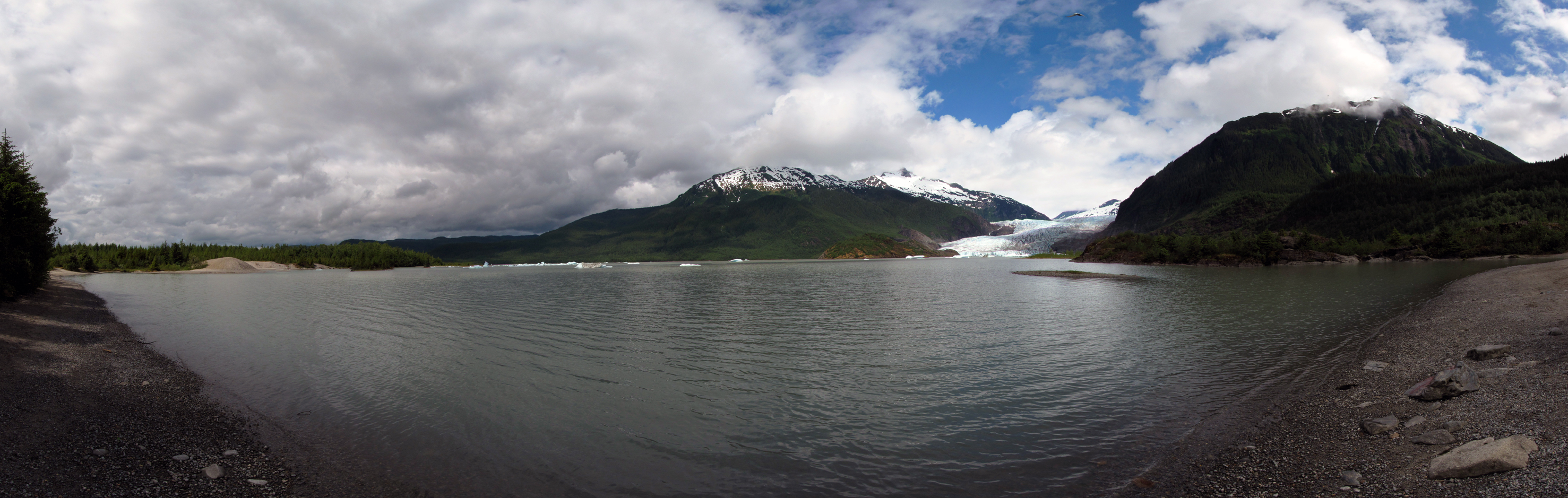
Mendenhall Lake and Glacier from the southeastern edge of the lake (June 2009) Bullard Mountain on right

Mendenhall Lake and Glacier from the Visitor Center (June 2006) (McGinnis Mountain centered)

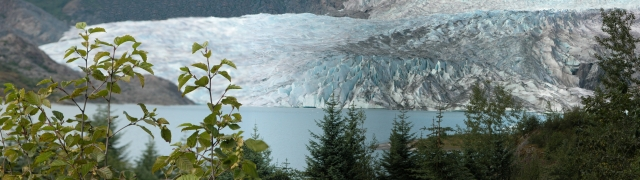
Mendenhall Glacier from a footpath (August 2003)

== See also ==
- Glaciology
- List of glaciers
- Nugget Falls
- Retreat of glaciers since 1850
- Marc-André Leclerc
