= Mendenhall River =

River in Alaska, United States

Coordinates: 58°20′43″N 134°36′55″W

The Mendenhall River (Lingít: Woosh Ilʼóox̱ʼu Héen) is an Alaskan river north of Juneau in the Mendenhall Valley. The river begins at the Mendenhall Lake, at the base of the Mendenhall Glacier. The river is about six miles (9 kilometers) long, one mile (1.6 km) of which is whitewater. It is crossed by the Brotherhood Bridge around where the surrounding landscape transitions from rural to urban.

The river is named in honor of Thomas Corwin Mendenhall, the superintendent of the United States Coast and Geodetic Survey (1889–1894).

== Flooding ==
Minor flood stage for the Mendenhall River is 12 feet (3.7 m), and a level of 14 feet (4.3 m) is more likely to cause extensive problems. If the Mendenhall is at minor flood stage, however, it is likely that areas such as Montana Creek, Jordan Creek, and the Mendenhall Lake are also experiencing flooding at that time.

Since 2011, periodic glacial floods have occurred from the Suicide Basin through the Mendenhall Glacier in Juneau, Alaska. A major release in 2023 destroyed two buildings. Two dozen homes were flooded in 2023, and about 300 in 2024.

Hesco barriers were installed for the 2025 flood season in some areas. Despite this, the 2025 flood reached at least 50 homes, severely damaging at least 6 outside the protected area.

== Recreation ==
Rafting is most popular on the river from May through September.

== See also ==
- List of Alaska rivers
- Mendenhall Glacier
- Mendenhall River Community School
- Mendenhall Wetlands State Game Refuge
- Thomas Corwin Mendenhall
