= Mendenhall Lake =

Lake in the United States

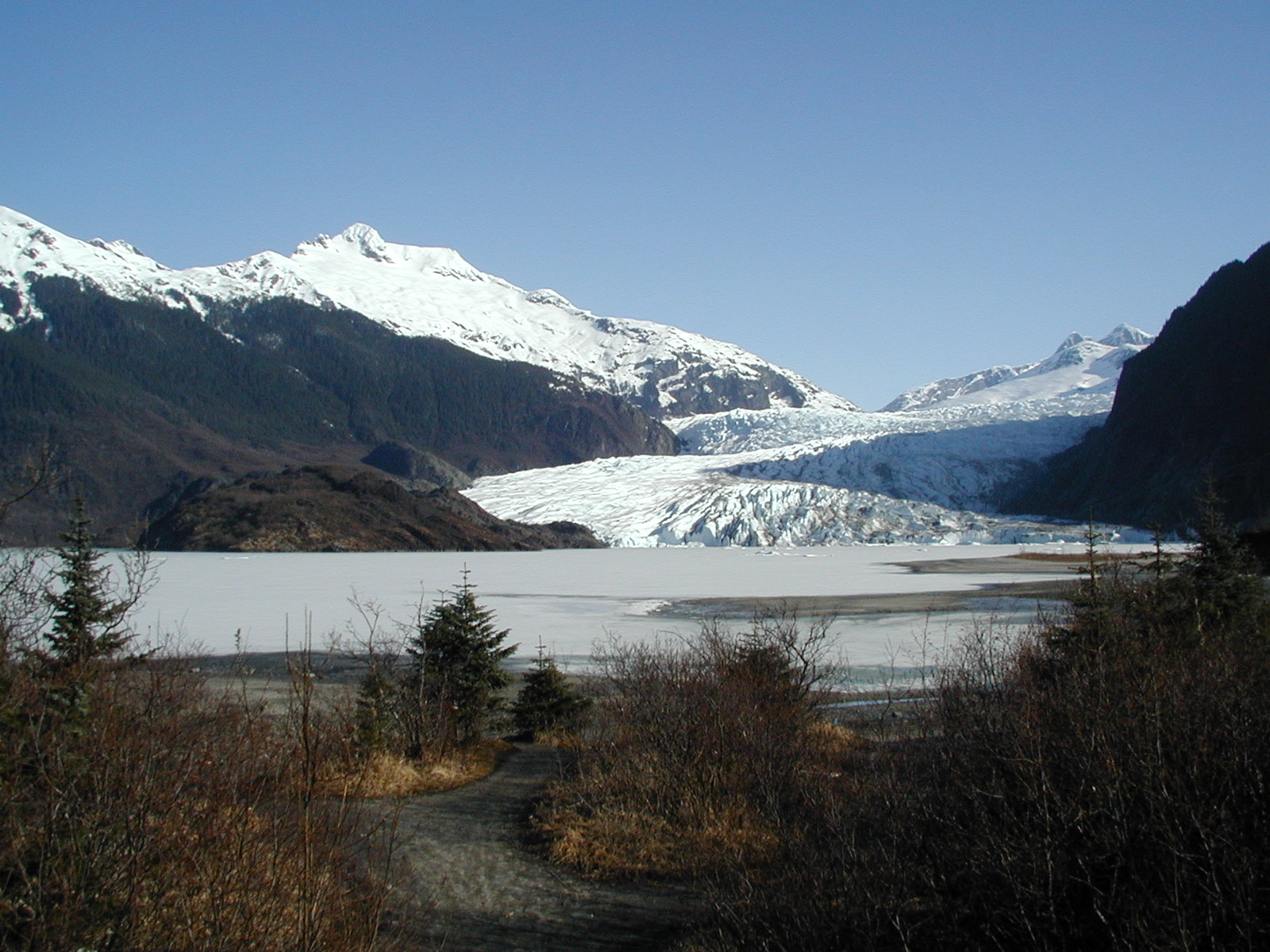
- The lake, mostly frozen over, and the Mendenhall Glacier

- Location within Alaska Location within North America
- Location: Juneau, Alaska
- Coordinates: 58°25′24″N 134°34′10″W
- Primary inflows: Mendenhall Glacier, Steep Creek, Nugget Creek
- Primary outflows: Mendenhall River
- Basin countries: United States
- Max. width: 1.8 miles (2.9 km)
- Surface elevation: 52 ft (16 m)

Mendenhall Lake (Tlingit: Sit'.áa) is a proglacial lake in the Mendenhall Valley at the 1962 terminus of Mendenhall Glacier, three miles (4.8 km) north of the Juneau Airport in the Coast Mountains. It is the source of the short Mendenhall River. The lake is included in the Mendenhall Glacier Recreation Area of the Tongass National Forest.

== Name ==
Like other geographic features with Mendenhall in their title, Mendenhall Lake is named for physicist and meteorologist Thomas Corwin Mendenhall.

Local name derived from the Mendenhall Glacier and published in 1962 by United States Geological Survey. In 1909, the lake was called McCush Lake by miners because Neil McCush had mining property near it (DeArmond, 1957, p. 31).
