= Columbine =

Columbine may refer to:

== Places ==
- Columbine, Colorado, a census-designate place in Jefferson and Arapahoe counties in Colorado, United States
  - Columbine High School, a high school in Columbine, Colorado, United States
    - Columbine Memorial, a memorial in Columbine, Colorado, United States, commemorating the Columbine High School massacre
- Columbine, Routt County, Colorado, an unincorporated community and historic district in Routt County, Colorado, United States
- Columbine Peak, a mountain in California
- Columbine Valley, Colorado, a town in Arapahoe County, Colorado, United States

== Massacres ==
- Columbine High School massacre, a 1999 school shooting in Columbine, Colorado
- Columbine Mine massacre, occurring during a 1927 strike by coal miners

== Arts, entertainment, and media ==
=== Fictitious characters ===
- Columbine (stock character) or Columbina, a stock character in the Commedia dell'arte
- Columbine, a stock character in Harlequinade

=== Other uses in arts, entertainment, and media ===
- Columbine (album), an album by Aura Dione
- Columbine (book), a 2009 book about the school shooting
- Columbine, a 1950 painting by Max Beckmann
- Bowling for Columbine, a 2002 film about the school shooting
- Columbine (band), a French hip-hop band
- "Columbine", a song by Townes Van Zandt, from the 1969 album Townes Van Zandt

== Biology ==
- Columbine (plant) or Aquilegia, a genus of flowers
- Stiboges nymphidia or columbine, a metalmark butterfly
- Columbine, pertaining to birds of the family Columbidae (doves and pigeons)

== People ==
- Edward H. Columbine, British naval officer

== Transportation ==
- Columbine, a locomotive of the Grand Junction Railway
- Columbine, a former passenger service operated by Union Pacific Railroad
- Columbine II and Columbine III, the Lockheed Constellation presidential aircraft used by US president Dwight D. Eisenhower
- HMS Columbine, a list of ships of the Royal Navy
  - HMS Columbine (1806), an 18-gun Cruizer-class brig-sloop
- HMS Wild Swan (1876) or HMS Columbine, an Osprey-class screw sloop

== Other uses ==
- Columbine, a racehorse in the 1842 Grand National
- Columbine effect, the legacy and impact of the Columbine High School massacre

== See also ==
- Colombine (disambiguation)
- Colombino (disambiguation)
- Colombina (disambiguation)
- Colombian (disambiguation)
- Colombiana (disambiguation)
- Colombia (disambiguation)
- Columbia (disambiguation)
- Columbian (disambiguation)
- Columbiana (disambiguation)
- Columbiad (disambiguation)
- Columbina (disambiguation)
