= Colombino =

Colombino (Spanish for Columbian and related to Christopher Columbus) may refer to:

- "Colombino" (song), by Connie Francis
- Codex Colombino, Mixtec codex
- Estadio Colombino, football stadium in Huelva, Spain (1957–2001)
- Estadio Nuevo Colombino, football stadium in Huelva, Spain (2001–present)
- Trofeo Colombino, football tournament in Huelva, Spain
- Terri Colombino (born 1975), American actress

== See also ==
- Voto colombino
- Lugares colombinos
- Pleitos colombinos
- Colombine (disambiguation)
- Colombina (disambiguation)
- Colombian (disambiguation)
- Colombiana (disambiguation)
- Colombia (disambiguation)
- Columbine (disambiguation)
- Columbina (disambiguation)
- Columbian (disambiguation)
- Columbiana (disambiguation)
- Columbiad (disambiguation)
- Columbia (disambiguation)
