= Colombine =

Colombine may refer to:

- Monte Colombine, Lombardy, Italy; a mountain
- Columbine, a stock character, and Harlequin's mistress
- "Colombine", a 1920 poem by Hugh McCrae
- Colombine, a 19th-century ship; see List of shipwrecks in June 1842
- Colombine, a sailing yacht that participated in sailing at the 1900 Summer Olympics
- Colombine Massacre, a deadly school shooting in Colombine, Colorado.

== See also ==
- Columbine (disambiguation)
- Columbina (disambiguation)
- Columbian (disambiguation)
- Columbiana (disambiguation)
- Columbia (disambiguation)
- Columbiad (disambiguation)
- Colombina (disambiguation)
- Colombino (disambiguation)
- Colombian (disambiguation)
- Colombiana (disambiguation)
- Colombia (disambiguation)
