= Columbiad (disambiguation) =

A columbiad is a type of gun from the 19th century, a large-caliber muzzle-loading cannon capable of firing at low and high angles

Columbiad may also refer to:

== Arts and entertainment ==
- The Columbiad, an epic poem about the founding of the United States of America
- Columbiad, the fictional astronaut-launching space gun created by Jules Verne for From the Earth to the Moon
- Columbiad (ballet), a ballet that debuted in 1939
- "Columbiad" (short story), a 1996 science fiction story by Stephen Baxter, republished in 1997 in Year's Best SF 2 multi-author anthology collection, and in 1998 in Stephen Baxter's anthology collection Traces (book)

== Other uses ==
- Columbiad (spacecraft), the informal name of the Apollo 8 space capsule
- Columbiad (journal), A Quarterly Review of the War Between the States [1997 to 2000 - 13 issues]

== See also ==
- Columbia (disambiguation)
- Columbian (disambiguation)
- Columbiana (disambiguation)
- Columbine (disambiguation)
- Columbina (disambiguation)
- Colombia (disambiguation)
- Colombian (disambiguation)
- Colombiana (disambiguation)
- Colombine (disambiguation)
- Colombina (disambiguation)
