= Columbian =

Columbian is the adjective form of Columbia. It may refer to:

== Buildings ==
- The Columbian Theatre, a music hall in northeastern Kansas
- The Columbian (Chicago), a building in Illinois

== Published works ==
- The Columbian, a daily newspaper published in Vancouver, Washington, U.S.
- Olympia Pioneer and Democrat, the first newspaper published in what is now the state of Washington, was known in its first two years (1852-53) as The Columbian.
- The Columbian Orator, a collection of political essays, poems, and dialogues first published in 1797
- Columbian Magazine, a monthly magazine published from 1786 to 1792

== Transportation ==
- Columbian (B&O train), a passenger train operated by Baltimore and Ohio Railroad until 1971
- Columbian (MILW train), a passenger train which operated from 1911 to 1955
- Sternwheeler Columbian disaster, a sternwheeler lost in the worst accident in the Yukon River's history in 1906
- 2-4-2, a type of steam locomotives, also called Columbian type

== Other uses ==
- Anything pertaining to Christopher Columbus, such as the Columbian contact and the Columbian exchange
- Columbian (typography), a name for 16-point type
- Columbian Period, the geological period 2060–1780 MYA named after the supercontinent Columbia
- An early alternative name for inhabitants of the United States
- Columbian Issue, a set of U.S. postage stamps marking the 1893 World Columbian Exposition
- World's Columbian Exposition, held in Chicago, Illinois, in 1893
- Columbian High School, Tiffin, Ohio
- Columbian School (disambiguation)
- Anything pertaining to the Knights of Columbus, (i.e. Columbian values)

== See also ==
- British Columbia
- Pre-Columbian era
- Columbia (disambiguation)
- Columbiad (disambiguation)
- Columbiana (disambiguation)
- Columbina (disambiguation)
- Columbine (disambiguation)
- Colombia (disambiguation)
- Colombian (disambiguation)
- Colombiana (disambiguation)
- Colombina (disambiguation)
- Colombino (disambiguation)
- Colombine (disambiguation)
