= Colombina (disambiguation) =

Colombina is a stock character and Harlequin's mistress.

Colombina may also refer to:

- Colombina Parra (born 1970), Chilean musician
- Colombina, a fictional character from Pinocchio (2019 film)
- Institución Colombina (Colombina Institute), Seville, Spain; an administrative unit of several libraries and archives
  - La Colombina, a library administered by the institute
- La Colombina, a band founded by Josep Cabré
- Colombina, the dove-shaped rocket traditionally fired in Florence, Italy; see Traditions of Italy
- Dulces Colombina, a multinational candy brand
- Colombina, a Dutch theatre award

== See also ==
- Columbina (disambiguation)
- Columbine (disambiguation)
- Columbian (disambiguation)
- Columbiana (disambiguation)
- Columbia (disambiguation)
- Columbiad (disambiguation)
- Colombine (disambiguation)
- Colombino (disambiguation)
- Colombian (disambiguation)
- Colombiana (disambiguation)
- Colombia (disambiguation)
