= C. colombiana =

C. colombiana may refer to:

- Carollia colombiana, the Colombian Short-tailed Bat
- Cryptotis colombiana, the Colombian small-eared shrew

== See also ==
- Colombiana (disambiguation)
