= Columbina (disambiguation) =

Columbina is a stock character and Harlequin's mistress.

Columbina may also refer to:

- Columbina (genus), a genus of dove
- Columbina Rural Service Center (or Columbina Township), Zhombe, Kwekwe, Midlands, Zimbabwe; a township
- Flora (Francesco Melzi) also called La Columbina; a 1520 painting by Francesco Melzi
- Columbina (Genshin Impact), a character in the 2020 video game Genshin Impact

== See also ==
- Colombina (disambiguation)
- Colombine (disambiguation)
- Colombian (disambiguation)
- Colombiana (disambiguation)
- Colombia (disambiguation)
- Columbine (disambiguation)
- Columbian (disambiguation)
- Columbiana (disambiguation)
- Columbia (disambiguation)
- Columbiad (disambiguation)
