= Observation Peak =

Observation Peak may refer to:

- Observation Peak (Alaska), near Juneau
- Observation Peak (Alberta), Banff National Park, Alberta, Canada
- Observation Peak (California), a mountain in California, United States
- Observation Peak (Wyoming) a mountain in Yellowstone National Park, Wyoming, United States
