= Mount Shakspere =

Mountain in the state of California

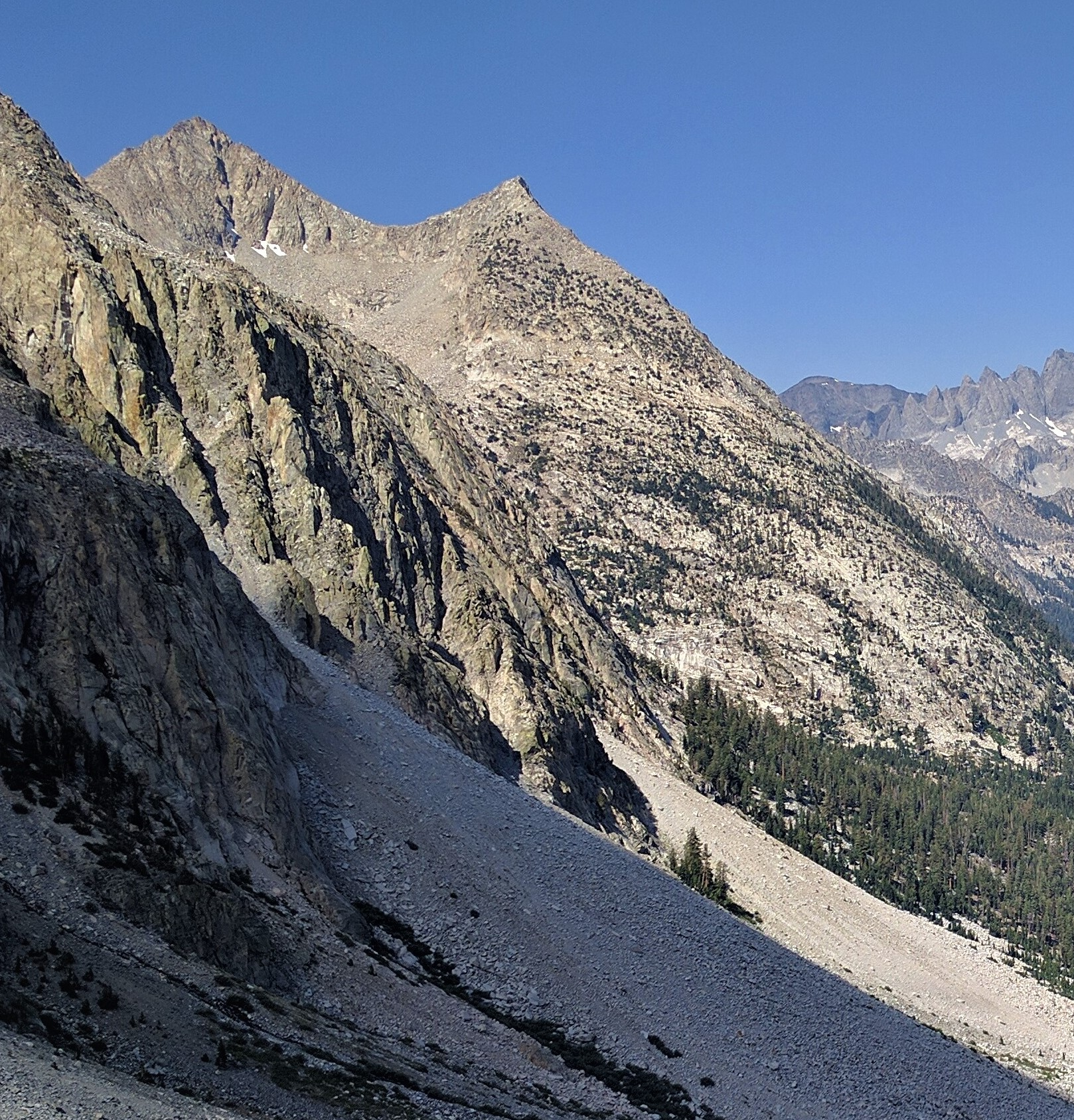
- Northeast aspect (summit in upper left corner)

Highest point
- Elevation: 12,174 ft (3,711 m)
- Prominence: 534 ft (163 m)
- Parent peak: Observation Peak (12,362 ft)
- Isolation: 1.05 mi (1.69 km)
- Coordinates: 37°02′12″N 118°31′57″W

Naming
- Etymology: William Shakespeare

Geography
- Location within California Location within the United States
- Location: Kings Canyon National Park; Fresno County, California, U.S.
- Parent range: Sierra Nevada
- Topo map: USGS North Palisade

Geology
- Rock type: granitic

Climbing
- First ascent: 1930 Francis P. Farquhar
- Easiest route: class 2

Mount Shakspere is a 12,174-foot-elevation (3,711-meter) summit located in Fresno County, California, United States.

== Description ==
The mountain is set four miles west of the crest of the Sierra Nevada mountain range, in the Palisades area of Kings Canyon National Park. It is situated 4.5 miles (7.2 km) southwest of Middle Palisade, 3.5 miles (5.6 km) southeast of Giraud Peak, and one mile north-northwest of line parent Observation Peak. Mt. Shakspere ranks as the 384th-highest summit in California, and topographic relief is significant as the summit rises over 3,500 feet (1,100 meters) above Palisade Creek in approximately one mile (1.6 km). The first ascent of the summit was made July 20, 1930, by Francis P. Farquhar, Mary Lou Michaels, Doris Drust, Lorna Kilgariff, and Robert L. Lipman. This mountain's name has been officially adopted by the United States Board on Geographic Names.

== Climate ==
Mount Shakspere is located in an alpine climate zone. Most weather fronts originate in the Pacific Ocean, and travel east toward the Sierra Nevada mountains. As fronts approach, they are forced upward by the peaks (orographic lift), causing them to drop their moisture in the form of rain or snowfall onto the range. Precipitation runoff from this mountain drains into tributaries of the Middle Fork Kings River.

== Gallery ==
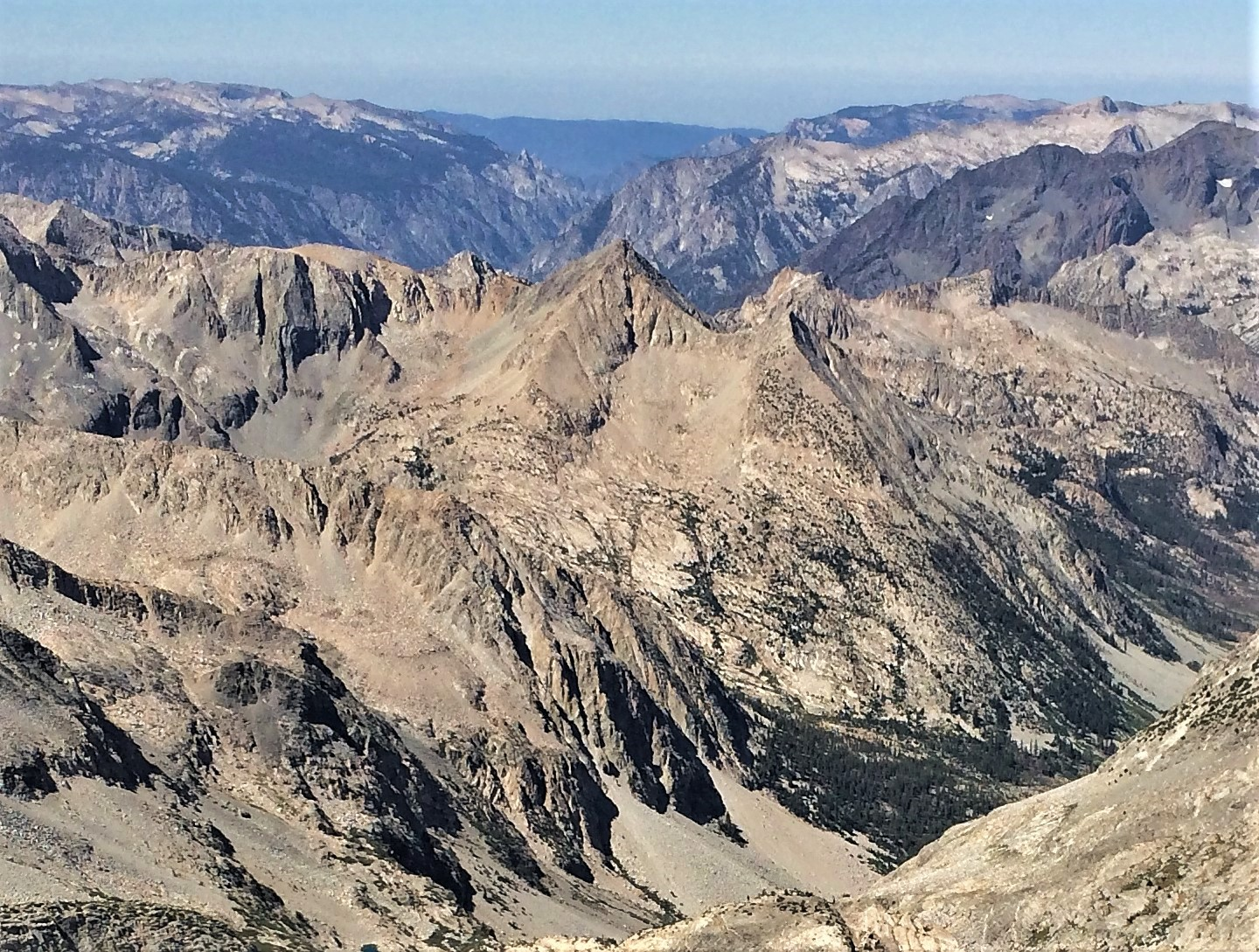
Mt. Shakspere (centered), from Middle Palisade

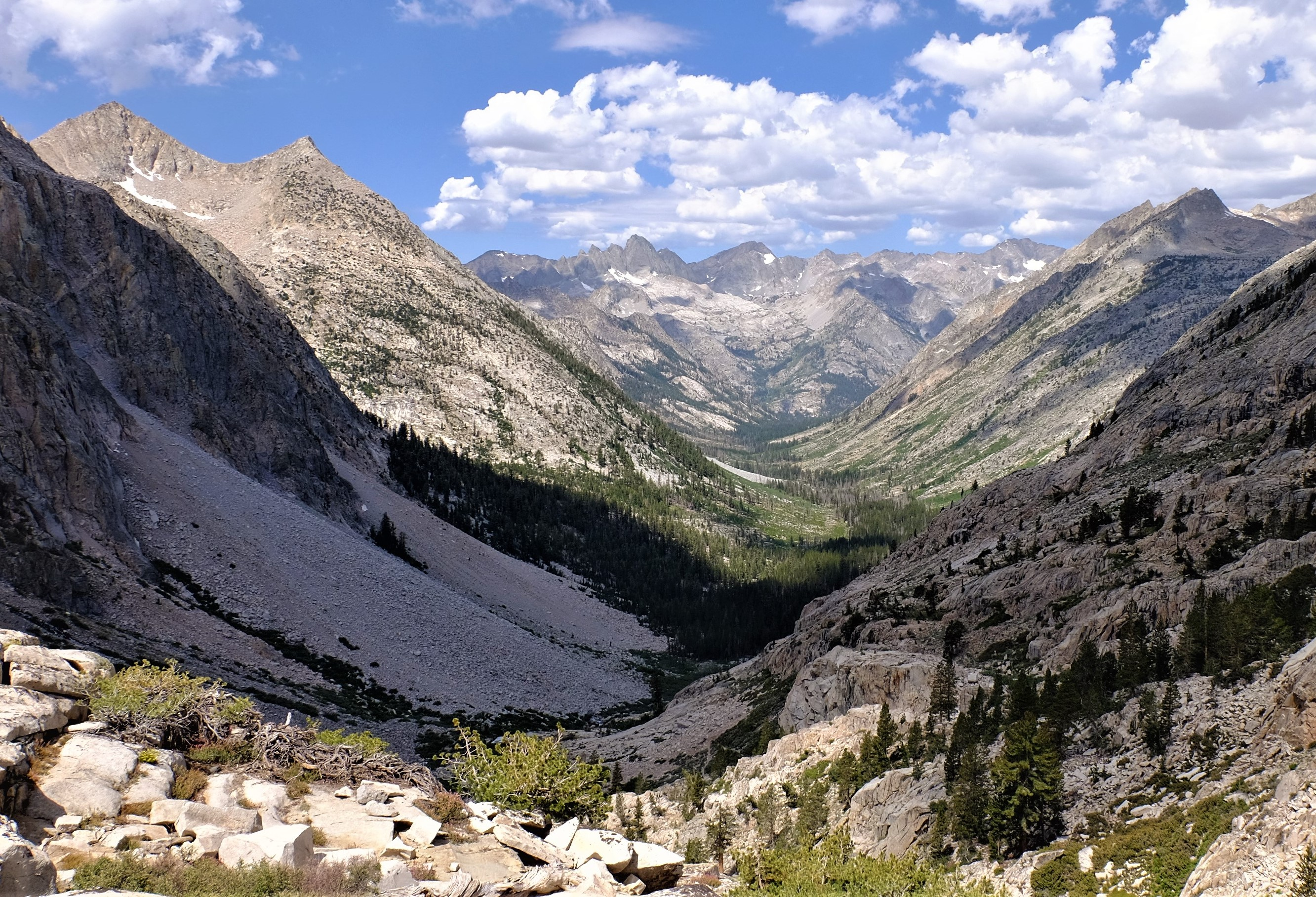
Mt. Shakspere (upper left), high above Palisade Creek valley

== See also ==
- Sequoia-Kings Canyon Wilderness
