= Colombians (disambiguation) =

Colombians are people from Colombia or of Colombian ancestry.

Colombians may also refer to:

- Citizens of Colombia, a country in South America.
- Colombian diaspora - emigrants of Colombia and their descendants, and Colombians living abroad
- Specific Colombians, collectively. See Lists of Colombians.

== See also ==
- Colombian (disambiguation)
