= Columbia Building =

Columbia Building may refer to:

in the United States

(by state)

- Columbian Building, Topeka, Kansas, listed on the NRHP in Kansas
- Columbia Building (Louisville, Kentucky)
- Columbia Building (Kansas City, Missouri), listed on the NRHP in Missouri
- Columbia Building (Columbus, Ohio), listed on the NRHP in Ohio

== See also ==
- Columbia Hall (disambiguation)
- Columbian School (disambiguation)
- Columbia Historic District (disambiguation)
