= Split Thumb =

Mountain in Alaska, U.S.

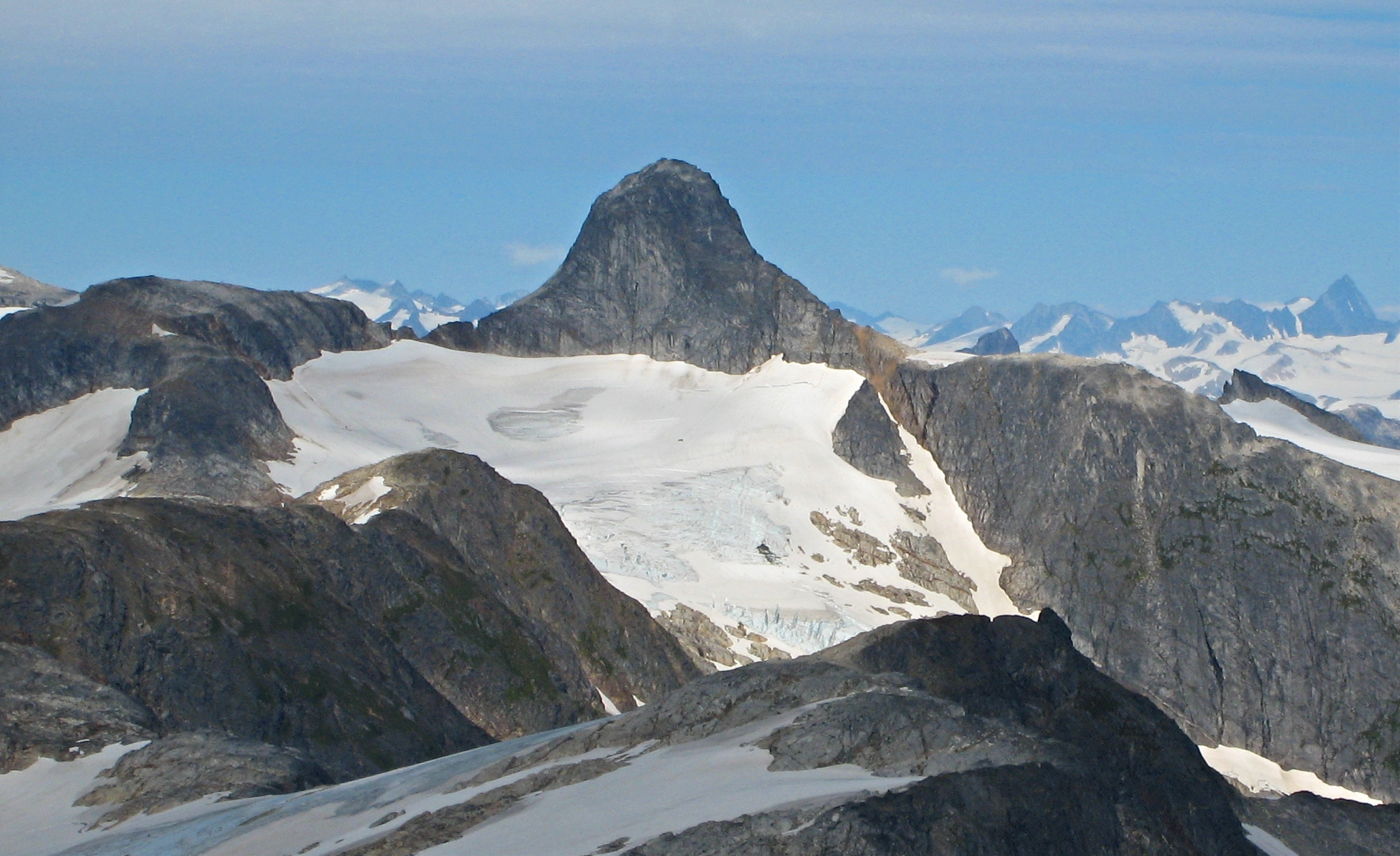
- Split Thumb, south aspect

Highest point
- Elevation: 5,523 ft (1,683 m)
- Prominence: 923 ft (281 m)
- Parent peak: Mount Wrather
- Isolation: 2.15 mi (3.46 km)
- Coordinates: 58°24′23″N 134°18′44″W

Geography
- Location within Alaska
- Interactive map of Split Thumb
- Country: United States
- State: Alaska
- Borough: Juneau
- Protected area: Tongass National Forest
- Parent range: Coast Mountains; Boundary Ranges; Juneau Icefield
- Topo map: USGS Juneau B-1

Geology
- Rock age: Late Cretaceous
- Rock type: Granitic
- Volcanic arc: Coast Range Arc

Climbing
- First ascent: July 2, 1954
- Easiest route: class 5.4 Southeast arête

Split Thumb is a 5,523 ft (1,680 m) glaciated mountain summit located in the Boundary Ranges of the Coast Mountains, in the U.S. state of Alaska. The peak is situated near the southern periphery of the Juneau Icefield, 9 mi (14 km) northeast of Juneau, 2.15 mi (3 km) southeast of Nugget Mountain, and 4 mi (6 km) east of Heintzleman Ridge, on land managed by Tongass National Forest. Split Thumb is surrounded by the Lemon Creek Glacier to the west, and Norris Glacier to east. The Split Thumb Icefall is set on the east aspect of the peak. This peak's descriptive name was published in 1951 by the U.S. Geological Survey. The first ascent of Split Thumb was made July 2, 1954, by a Juneau Icefield Research Project party comprising Edward LaChapelle, Dick Hubley, Carlton Ray, Dr. Conrad Buettner, and Bob Goodwin.

== Climate ==
Based on the Köppen climate classification, Split Thumb is located in a subarctic climate zone, with long, cold, snowy winters, and cool summers. Weather systems coming off the Gulf of Alaska are forced upwards by the Coast Mountains (orographic lift), causing heavy precipitation in the form of rainfall and snowfall. Winter temperatures can drop below 0 °F with wind chill factors below −10 °F. The month of July offers the most favorable weather to view or climb Split Thumb.

== Gallery ==
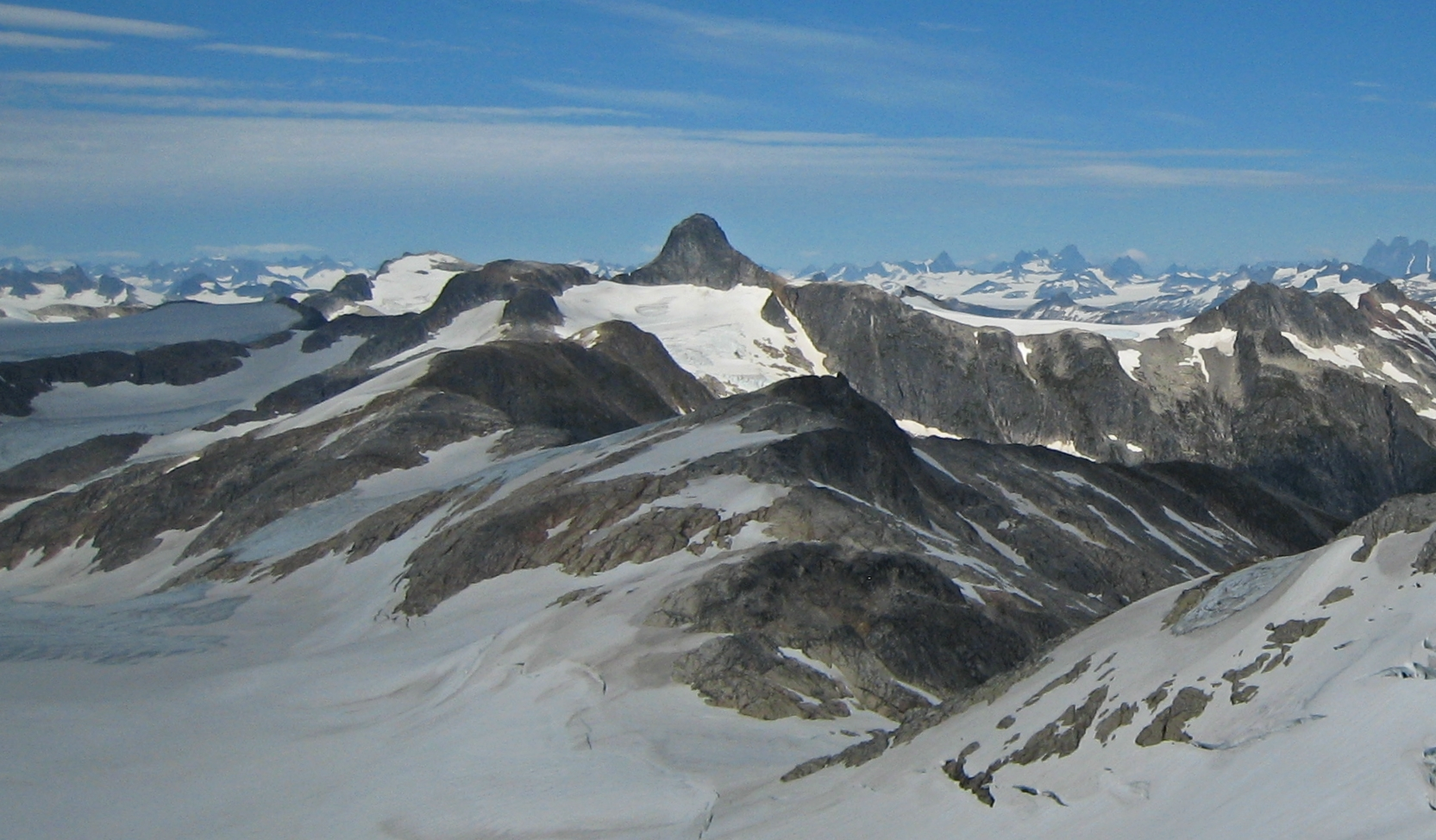
Looking north at Split Thumb as seen from Observation Peak

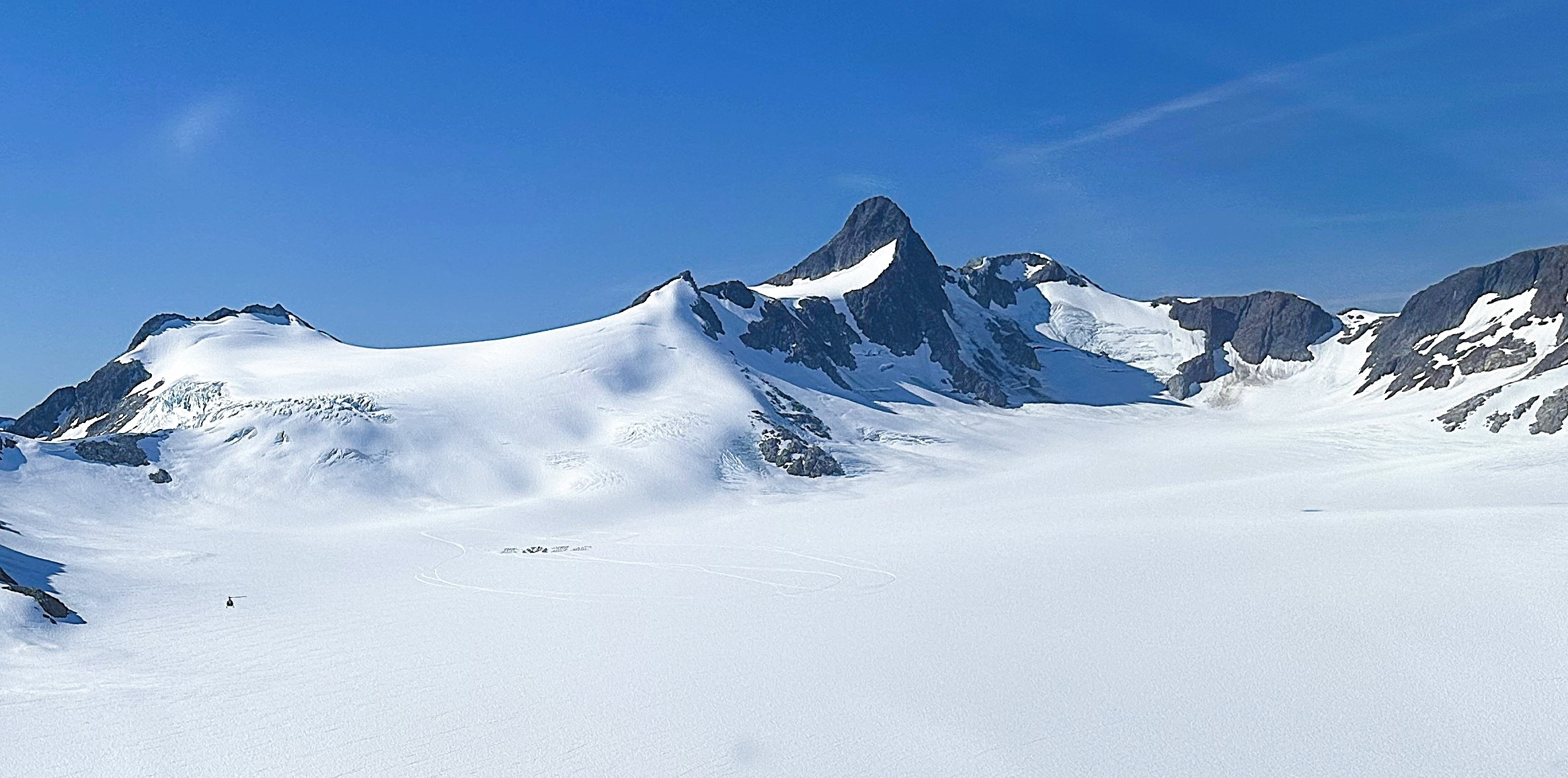
North aspect

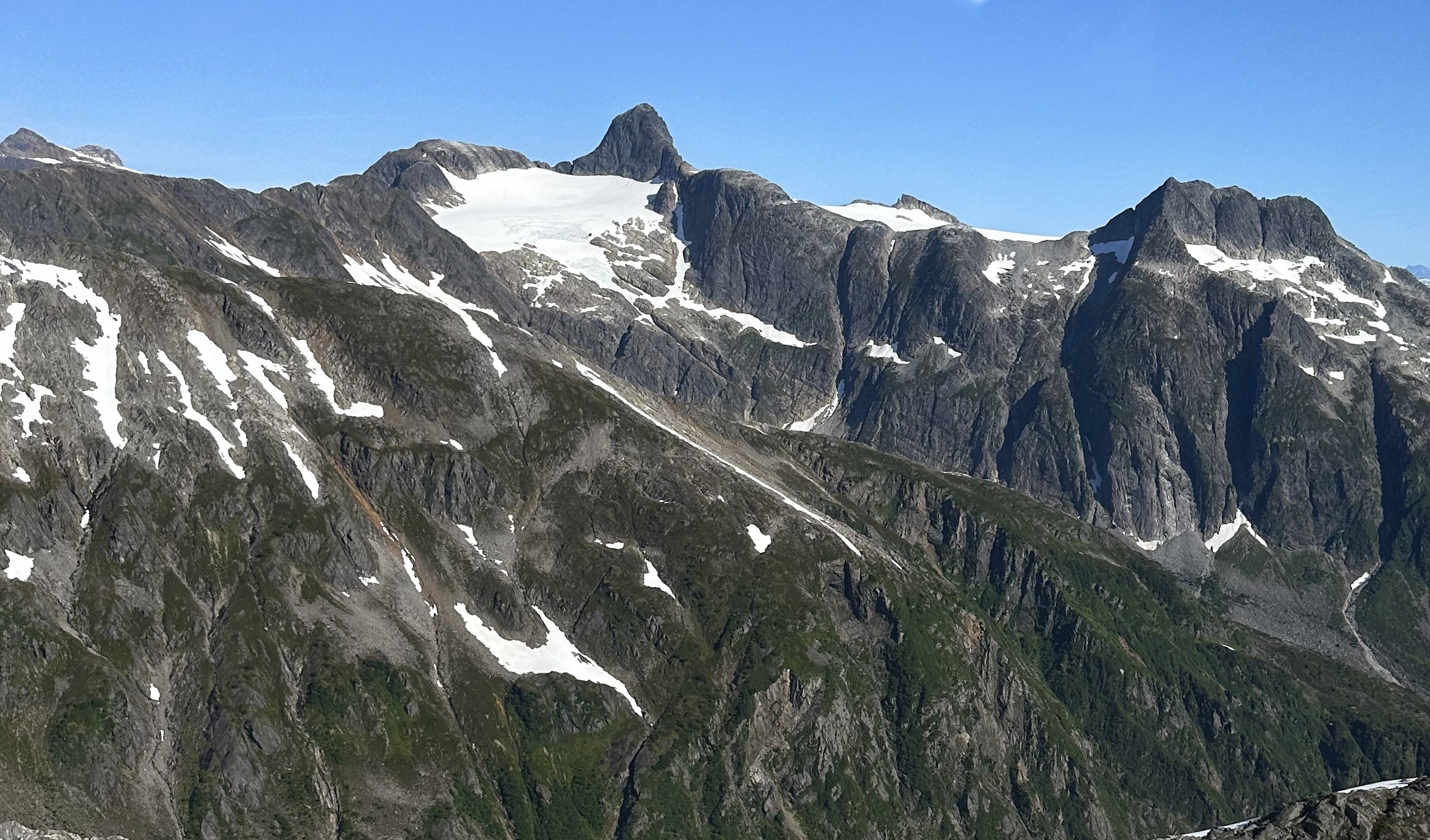
South aspect

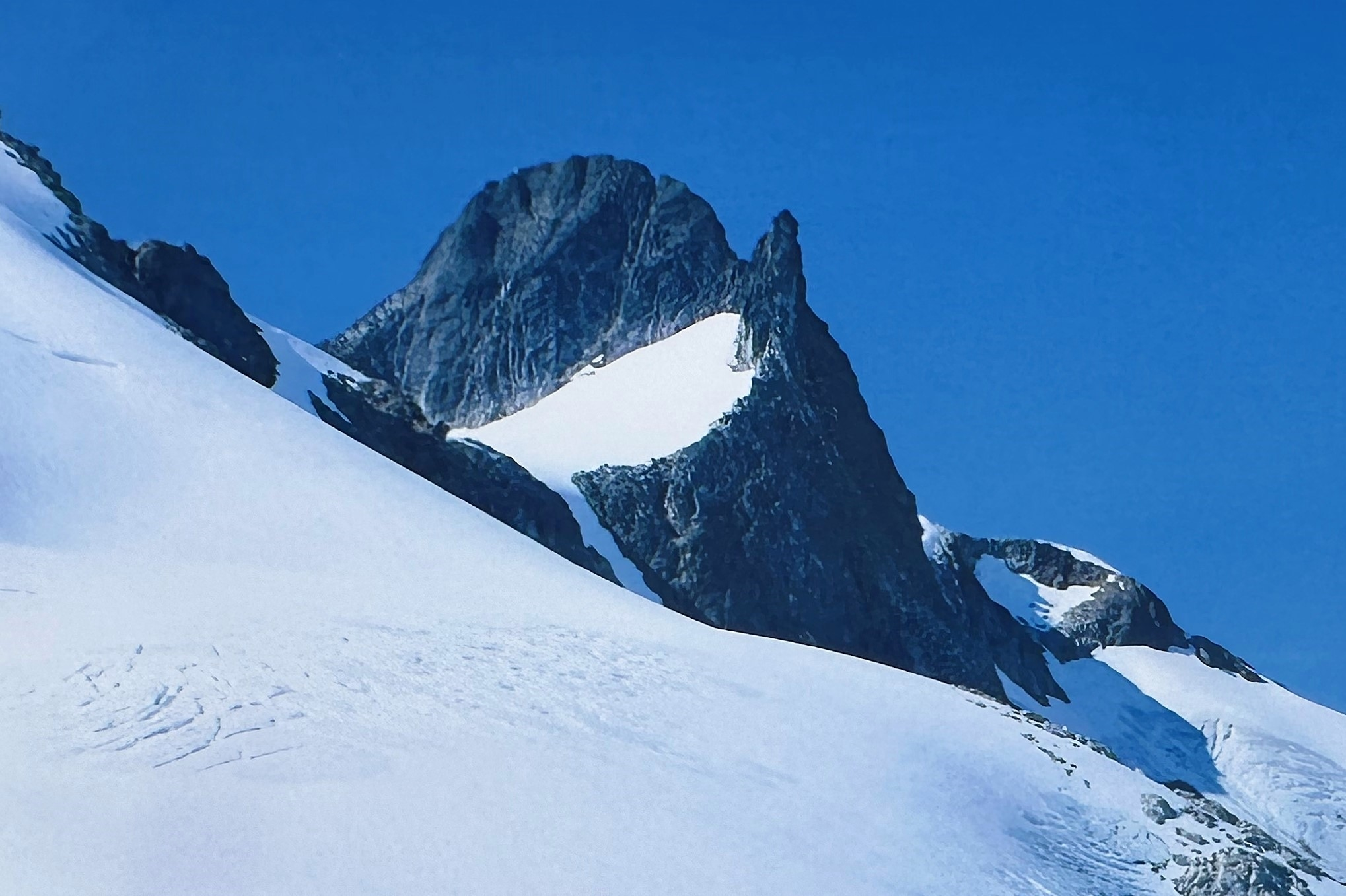
Northeast aspect

== See also ==
- Geospatial summary of the High Peaks/Summits of the Juneau Icefield
- Geography of Alaska
