= Nugget Mountain =

Mountain in Alaska, United States

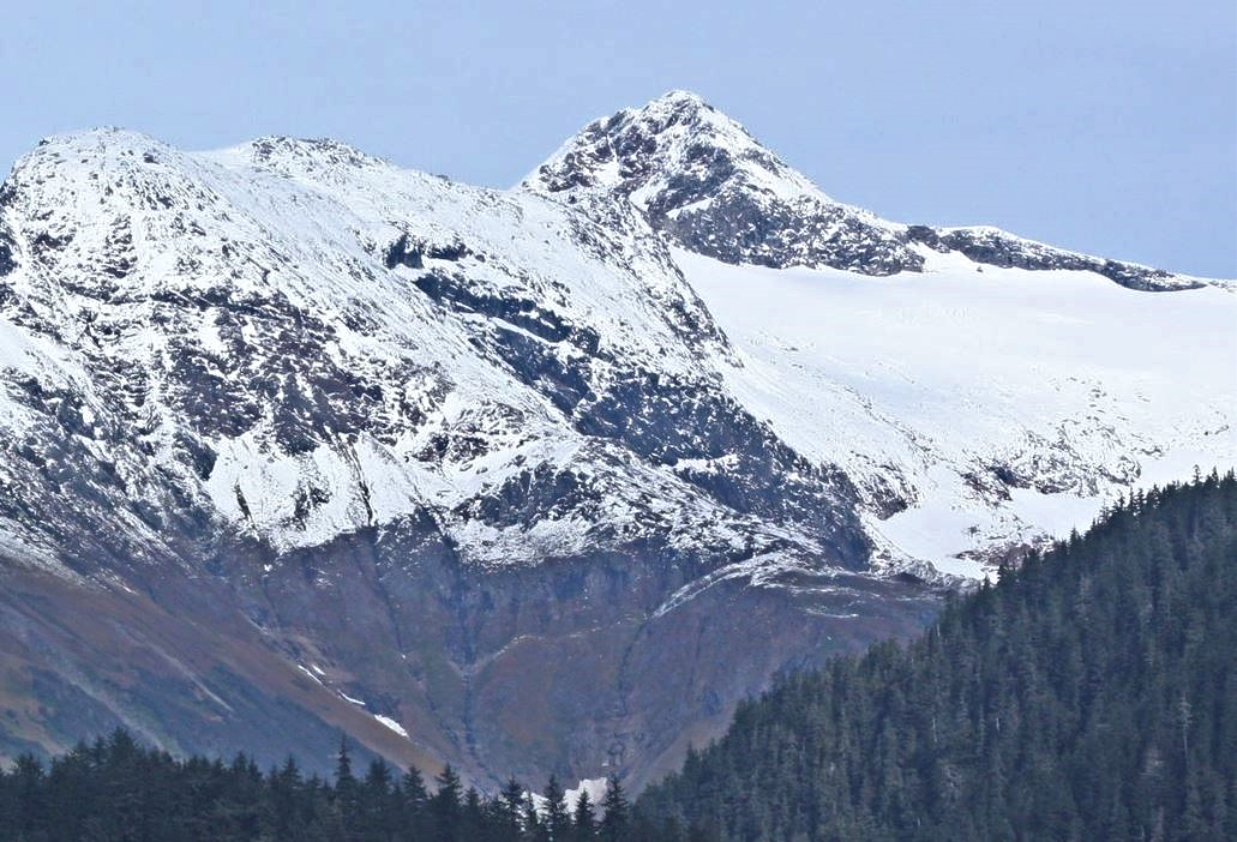
- Nugget Mountain, from southwest

Highest point
- Elevation: 5,587 ft (1,703 m)
- Prominence: 987 ft (301 m)
- Parent peak: Spencer Peak
- Isolation: 4.62 mi (7.44 km)
- Coordinates: 58°25′32″N 134°21′23″W

Geography
- Location within Alaska
- Interactive map of Nugget Mountain
- Location: Tongass National Forest; Juneau Borough; Alaska, United States
- Parent range: Coast Mountains; Boundary Ranges; Juneau Icefield
- Topo map: USGS Juneau B-2

Nugget Mountain is a 5,587 ft (1,700 m) glaciated mountain summit located in the Boundary Ranges of the Coast Mountains, in the U.S. state of Alaska.

== Location ==
The peak is situated near the southern periphery of the Juneau Icefield, 2.15 mi (3 km) northwest of Split Thumb, 5.4 mi (9 km) east of Bullard Mountain, and 9 mi (14 km) northeast of Juneau. Nugget Mountain rises above the northeast end of Heintzleman Ridge, and 4.15 mi (7 km) east-southeast of Nugget Towers. Nugget Mountain is set south of the head of the Nugget Glacier, and west of Norris Glacier, on land managed by Tongass National Forest. Nugget Creek and Lemon Creek drain precipitation runoff from the west and south slopes of the peak. This peak's local name was published in 1962 by the U.S. Geological Survey.

== Climate ==
Based on the Köppen climate classification, Nugget Mountain is located in a subarctic climate zone, with long, cold, snowy winters, and cool summers. Weather systems coming off the Gulf of Alaska are forced upwards by the Coast Mountains (orographic lift), causing heavy precipitation in the form of rainfall and snowfall. Temperatures can drop below −20 °C with wind chill factors below −30 °C. The month of July offers the most favorable weather to view or climb Nugget Mountain.

== Gallery ==
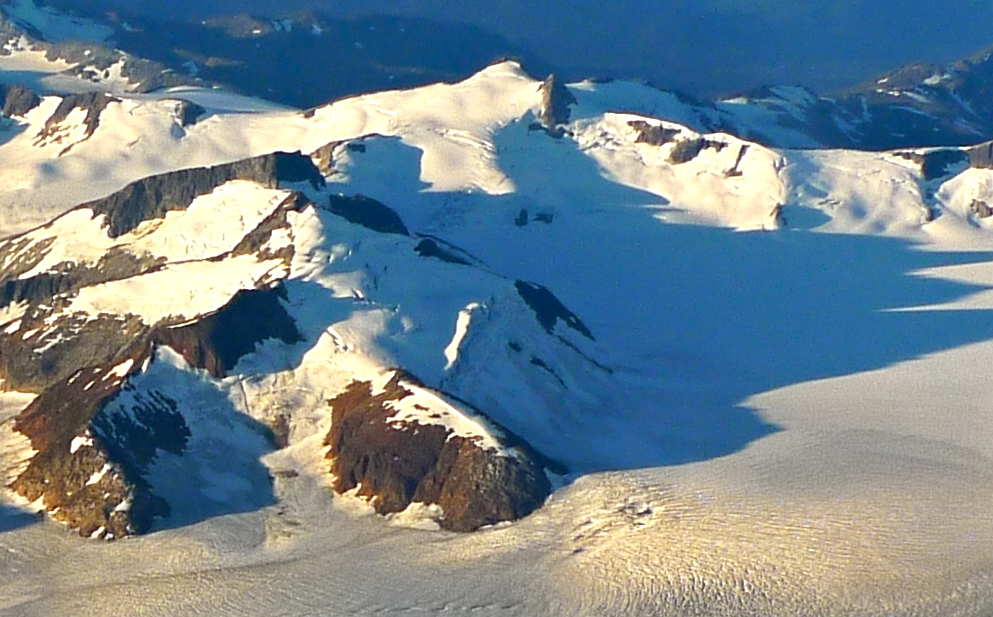
Looking south at Nugget Mountain centered at top of frame

== See also ==
- Geospatial summary of the High Peaks/Summits of the Juneau Icefield
- Geography of Alaska
- Nugget Towers
