= Colombo (disambiguation) =

Colombo is the largest city and commercial capital of Sri Lanka.

Colombo may also refer to:

== Places ==
- Colombo (crater), lunar crater
- Colombo Airport (disambiguation), two airports that serve Colombo, Sri Lanka
- Colombo District, administrative district which includes Colombo, Sri Lanka
- Colombo, Paraná, Brazil
- Colombo Centre, shopping mall in Lisbon, Portugal
- Colombo, medieval name of Kollam, Southern India

== People ==
- Colombo (surname)
  - Christopher Columbus, as Cristoforo Colombo is known in English
- Colombo crime family, an American crime family based in New York

== Organizations ==
- Colombo Dockyard, ship building company in Sri Lanka
- Colombo FC, professional football club in Sri Lanka
- Colombo Plan, South-Asian economic development organization
- Colombo Yogurt, American company

== Other uses ==
- Colombo (herb)
- Colombo (horse), British Thoroughbred racehorse
- Bagalini Colombo, Italian ultralight aircraft design
- MV Colombo Express, container ship
- Colombo Street, street in central Christchurch
- Operation Colombo, an operation undertaken by the Chilean secret police

== See also ==
- Columbo, a television show and its titular character, sometimes translated or mistakenly spelled "Colombo"
