= Colombian =

Colombian may refer to:

- Something of, from, or related to the country of Colombia
- Colombians, persons from Colombia, or of Colombian descent
  - For more information about the Colombian people, see:
    - Demographics of Colombia
    - Indigenous peoples in Colombia, Native Colombians
    - Colombian American
  - For specific persons, see List of Colombians
- Colombian Spanish, one of the languages spoken in Colombia
  - See also languages of Colombia
- Colombian culture
- Colombian sheep, a sheep breed
- Colombian necktie
- Columbians Drum and Bugle Corps, based in Pasco, Washington
- "Colombians", a 2017 instrumental Gorillaz track, released in the Super Deluxe boxset of Humanz.

== See also ==
- Christopher Columbus (1451–1506), Italian explorer after which Colombia was named
- Coffee production in Colombia
- Colombia (disambiguation)
- Colombiana (disambiguation)
- Colombina (disambiguation)
- Colombino (disambiguation)
- Colombine (disambiguation)
- Columbia (disambiguation)
- Columbiad (disambiguation)
- Columbian (disambiguation)
- Columbiana (disambiguation)
- Columbine (disambiguation)
- Columbina (disambiguation)
