= Giraud Peak =

Mountain in the American state of California

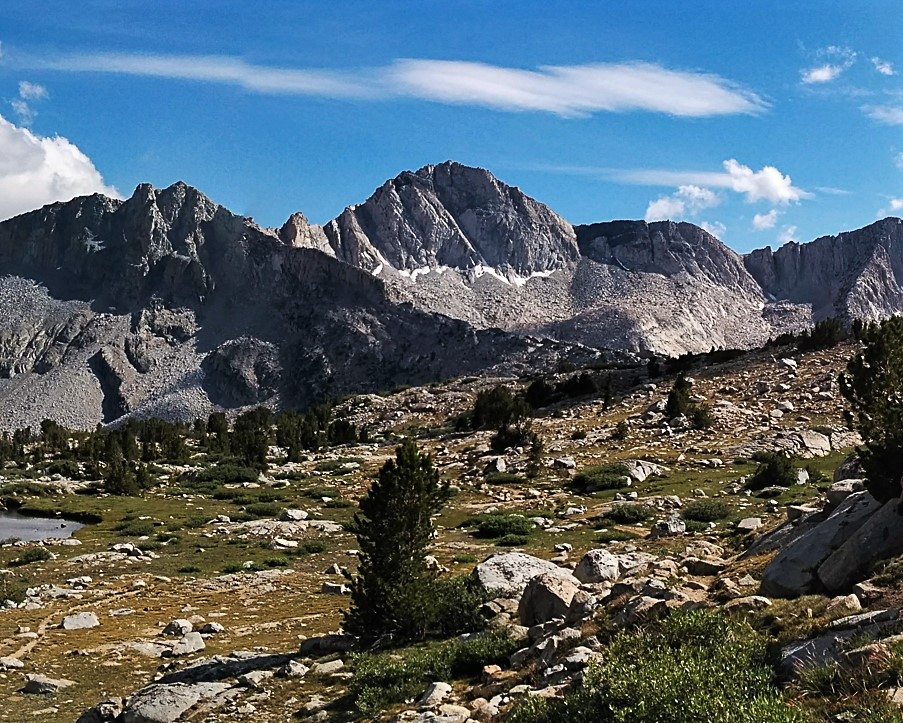
- North aspect

Highest point
- Elevation: 12,608 ft (3,843 m)
- Prominence: 888 ft (271 m)
- Parent peak: Columbine Peak (12,662 ft)
- Isolation: 1.50 mi (2.41 km)
- Listing: Sierra Peaks Section
- Coordinates: 37°04′38″N 118°33′52″W

Naming
- Etymology: Pierre Joseph Giraud

Geography
- Location within California Location within the United States
- Country: United States
- State: California
- County: Fresno
- Protected area: Kings Canyon National Park
- Parent range: Sierra Nevada; Palisades
- Topo map: USGS North Palisade

Geology
- Rock type: granite

Climbing
- First ascent: 1925 Norman Clyde
- Easiest route: class 2 East arête

Giraud Peak is a 12,608-foot-elevation (3,843-meter) mountain summit located west of the crest of the Sierra Nevada mountain range, in Fresno County of northern California, United States. It is situated in the Palisades area of northern Kings Canyon National Park, 3.0 miles (4.8 km) southwest of North Palisade, and 1.5 miles (2.4 km) southwest of Columbine Peak, the nearest higher neighbor. Giraud Peak ranks as the 258th-highest summit in California. Topographic relief is significant as the west aspect rises 4,400 feet (1,300 meters) above LeConte Canyon in less than two miles. On the direct opposite side of the canyon The Citadel stands guard. The first ascent of the summit was made September 1, 1925, by Norman Clyde via the east arête.

== Etymology ==
This mountain's name has been officially adopted by the United States Board on Geographic Names. It was probably named for Pierre "Little Pete" Giraud (1874–1907), a shepherd of Inyo County who was made famous in Mary Austin's 1906 book, The Flock. Pierre and his younger brother, Alfred, were French immigrants who arrived in the Owens Valley, where they grazed sheep for many years at the head of the South and Middle Forks of Kings River.

== Climate ==
Giraud Peak is located in an alpine climate zone. Most weather fronts originating in the Pacific Ocean travel east toward the Sierra Nevada mountains. As fronts approach, they are forced upward by the peaks, causing them to drop their moisture in the form of rain or snowfall onto the range (orographic lift). Precipitation runoff from this mountain drains into tributaries of the Middle Fork Kings River.

== Gallery ==
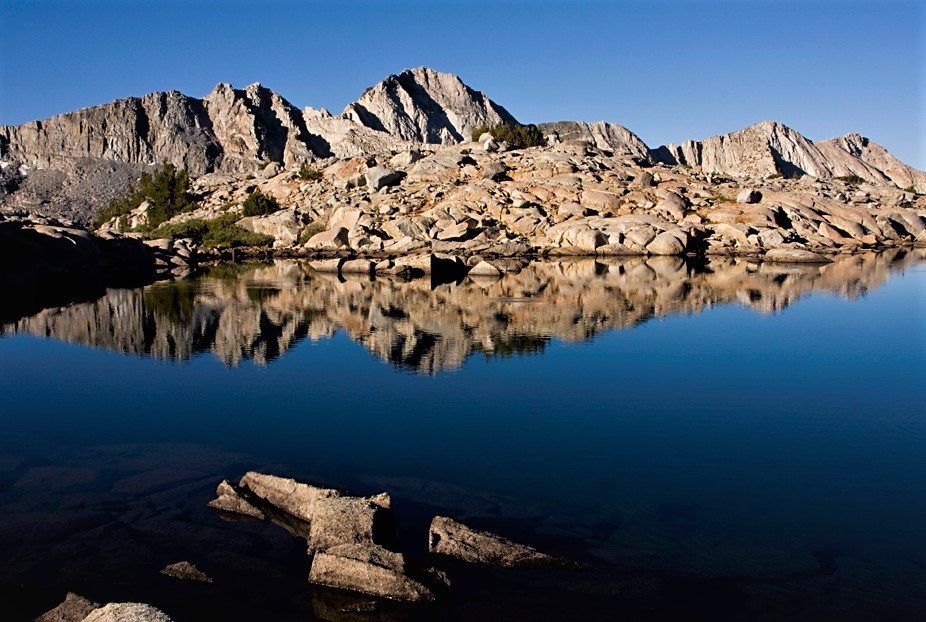
from Dusy Basin

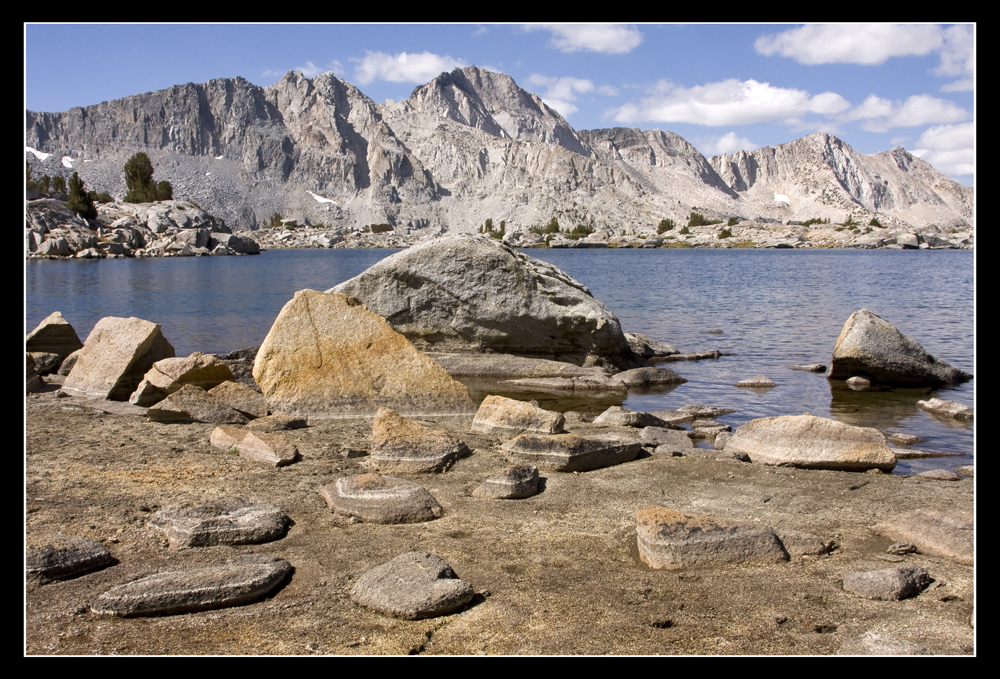
from Dusy Basin

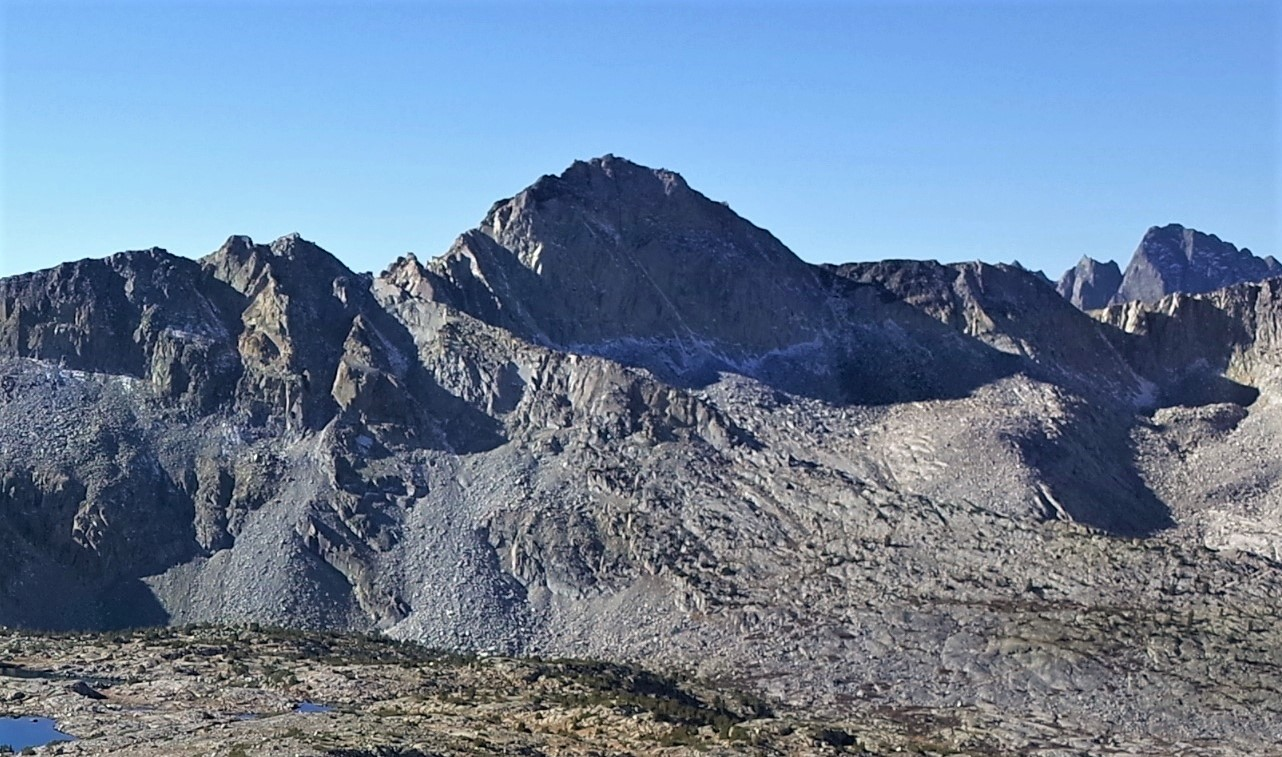
from Bishop Pass. (The top of Devils Crags visible to the right)

== See also ==
- List of mountain peaks of California
