= Columbia Hall =

Columbia Hall may refer to:

- Columbia Hall (Dannebrog, Nebraska), a historic building
- Columbia Hall, a hotel and opera house in Stone City, Iowa
- Columbia Hall, a building at the University of Oregon
- Columbia Hall, commonly known as Paresis Hall, a bar and brothel in New York City managed by James T. Ellison
- Columbia Hall, a contributing building in Stephens College South Campus Historic District, in Missouri
- Columbia Hall, a recording studio in Berlin Encores and New Songs
- Columbia Hall, a building at University of South Carolina

== See also ==
- Columbia Building (disambiguation)
- Columbia City Hall (South Carolina)
