= Eastern Cordillera small-footed shrew =

Conservation status
- Data Deficient (IUCN 3.1)

Scientific classification
- Kingdom: Animalia
- Phylum: Chordata
- Class: Mammalia
- Order: Eulipotyphla
- Family: Soricidae
- Genus: Cryptotis
- Species: C. brachyonyx

Binomial name
- Cryptotis brachyonyx Woodman, 2003
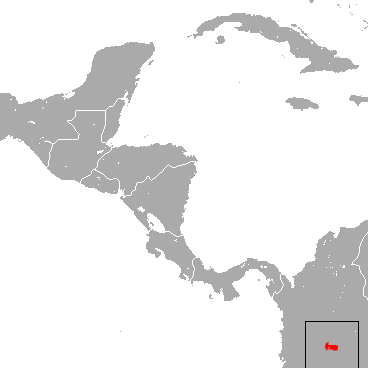
- Eastern Cordillera small-footed shrew range

Species of mammal

The Eastern Cordillera small-footed shrew (Cryptotis brachyonyx) is a species of mammal in the family Soricidae. It is endemic to Colombia, where it is known from the western slopes of the central Cordillera Oriental at elevations from 1,300 to 2,715 m (4,265 to 8,907 ft). It resembles C. colombiana. The species is only known from four individuals collected at two localities, the most recent record being from 1925.
