= HMS Columbine =

Six ships and one depot of the Royal Navy have borne the name HMS Columbine, after the common name for the plant Aquilegia. A seventh ship was planned, but renamed before being launched:

- HMS Columbine was to have been a 22-gun sixth rate, but she was renamed HMS Cyane in 1805 and launched in 1806.
- HMS Columbine (1806) was an 18-gun Cruizer-class brig-sloop launched in 1806 and wrecked in 1824.
- HMS Columbine (1826) was an 18-gun sloop launched in 1826. She was converted to a 12-gun brig in 1849, a coal hulk in 1854, and was sold in 1892.
- HMS Columbine (1862) was a wooden screw sloop launched in 1862 and broken up in 1875.
- HMS Columbine (1897) was a tender purchased in 1897 and sold in 1907.
- HMS Columbine was an Osprey-class screw sloop launched as HMS Wild Swan in 1876, converted to a base ship and renamed HMS Clyde in 1904, renamed HMS Columbine in 1912 and sold in 1920.
- HMS Columbine was a naval base at Port Edgar on the Firth of Forth between 1917 and 1938.
- HMS Columbine (K94) was a Flower-class corvette launched in 1940. She was sold in 1946 as the civilian vessel Lief Welding, and was broken up in 1966.
