= Criollo sheep =

Breed of sheep

The Criollo (also known as Creole, Chilludo, Pampa, Colombian, Lucero, Tarhumara, Uruguayan, and Venezuelan) is a breed of domestic sheep originating in the highlands of South and Central America. In the mid 16th Century, Spanish settlers brought the Churra with them. This is believed to be the ancestor of the modern day Criollo. The Criollo is raised primarily for meat.

== Characteristics ==
The wool is coarse and is of carpet type. The Criollo is typically black, white or pied. On average and at maturity, rams weigh 32.8 kg (72 lb) and ewes weigh 26.1 kg (58 lb). On average, ewes have 1.02 lambs per litter. The Criollo may be resistant to endoparasite infestation.
