= Sternwheeler Columbian disaster =

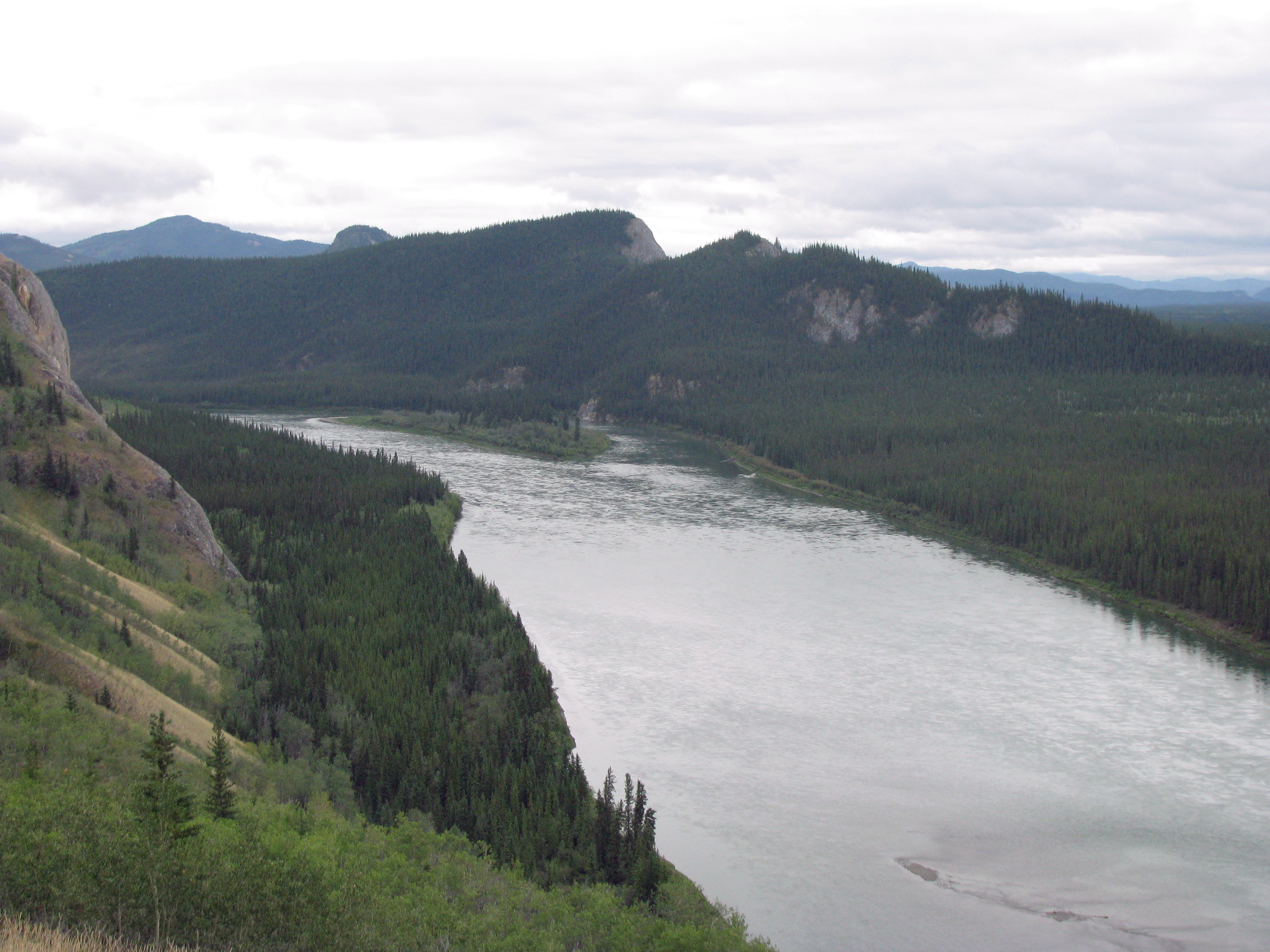
- Site of the disaster on the Yukon River
- Date: September 25, 1906
- Location: Yukon River, Eagle Rock, Yukon, Canada
- Participants: H. C. Baughman; A. Borrowman; Lionel Cadogan Cowper; Carl Christianson, aka "J. Smith"; A. D. Lewis; Frank J. Mavis; Edward Morgan; Phil Murray; C. D. Phillips; C. Smith; Joe Welsh; J. O. Williams; John Woods
- Deaths: 6

In what was characterized as the worst disaster in the Yukon River's history, the sternwheeler Columbian exploded and burned at Eagle Rock, Yukon, Canada, on 25 September, 1906, killing six men. The steamer was carrying a crew of twenty-five men and a full cargo, including cattle and three tons (2.722 t) of blasting powder destined for the Tantalus coal mine, thirty miles (48 km) downriver.

The Columbian was one hundred and forty-seven feet (45 m) long, thirty feet (9.1 m) wide, and capable of carrying one hundred and seventy-five passengers plus freight. The engine room was thirty-five feet (11 m) long, housing two high-pressure engines. Built in 1898 by John Todd for the Canadian Development Company (CDC), it was the first CDC steamer to arrive at Dawson City that year, carrying two prefabricated steel steamers for the North-West Mounted Police. The Columbian was bought by the British Yukon Navigation Company along with sixteen other CDC steamers in 1901. In 1905, it had been converted to burn coal from the Tantalus Butte Coal Mine.

== The accident ==
On the day of the accident, the Columbian was carrying only one passenger: Ernest Wynstanley, a stowaway who had sneaked aboard, pretending to be the caretaker of the cattle on board. He was to have been thrown off when the ship docked at Tantalus. In addition to the cattle, the Columbian was also carrying one hundred and fifty tons (136.08 t) of vegetables and meat, along with three tons (2.722 t) of blasting powder.

The 1906 season crew included J. O. Williams, captain; H. C. Baughman, mate; A. Borrowman, steward; Lionel Cadogan Cowper, purser; Carl Christianson (shipping on as "J. Smith"), deckhand and coal trimmer; A. D. Lewis, chief engineer; Frank J. Mavis, second engineer; Edward Morgan, fireman; Phil Murray, deckboy; C. D. Phillips, deckboy; C. Smith, purser; Joe Welsh, mate; and John Woods, deckhand.

The explosion happened after Murray passed his illicitly-held loaded rifle to Morgan, so that the fireman could take pot shots at a flock of ducks on the water. Morgan tripped and accidentally discharged the gun into the load of blasting powder stored on deck. Following the ensuing explosion and fire, the captain grounded the ship on shore; those not killed or injured by the blast jumped ashore to safety.

The explosion blew out the sides of the vessel, scattered men and cargo in the water, and in less than five minutes had involved the whole inside of the ship in a mass of seething flame.

—Dawson Daily News, 26 September, 1906

Six men were killed: Morgan and Welsh were killed instantly, Christianson, Murray, and Woods died before help arrived, and Cowper died several days later of his injuries. The entire cargo was also lost. Welsh's body turned up on the river two months later, but no trace of Morgan was ever found.

== Rescue ==
The crew had no provisions and no way to easily go for help. The closest telegraph office was thirty miles (48 km) away at Tantalus. A party of three set out on foot; they were overtaken by Captain Williams and Engineer Mavis in a canoe they had borrowed from a woodcutter.

Arriving at Tantalus after midnight, they woke up the telegraph operator who sent out a message about the disaster with no response—all the other operators were asleep. The first to receive the message, at 9:00 a.m. on 26 September, was at Whitehorse. The first ship to arrive at the scene of the explosion was the sternwheeler Victorian, arriving at 7:00 p.m. Captain Williams had returned that morning; Christianson and Woods had died during the night. Murray died shortly after being carried aboard the Victorian.

Another sternwheeler, the Dawson, had been dispatched from Whitehorse with a doctor and nurses aboard. The Dawson had not received the news until 1:00 p.m. on 26 September; at 1:00 a.m. on 27 September, the Dawson took the crew of the Columbian on board and returned to Whitehorse, where Cowper soon died.

== Aftermath ==
A coroner's jury was called to investigate the cause of the Columbian disaster and returned the following verdict:

That these three men came to their deaths as the result of burns received in an explosion of powder on the forward part of the deck of the Steamer Columbian, and further this jury attaches no blame to any of the surviving officers or crew.

—The Weekly Star, 26 October, 1909[sic]

The bodies of Welsh and Morgan had not been recovered at the time of the jury's deliberations; the cause of their disappearance and deaths was not considered by the inquest. The body of Welsh was found in November on a bar in the Yukon River between Tantalus and Five Fingers, about twenty-five to thirty miles (40 to 48 km) below the site of the disaster. A lynx had been spotted gnawing on something on the bar; Welsh was identified by the buttons remaining on his vest which was still on his body.

After the explosion the boiler and engines were stripped from the wreck and transported to Dawson City; the boiler was installed on the sternwheeler Casca in 1907. The hull, deemed a menace to navigation, was floated downstream and abandoned in "Columbia" slough.

A monument was erected in the Whitehorse cemetery bearing the names of the men who died.
