= Observation Peak (California) =

Mountain in the state of California

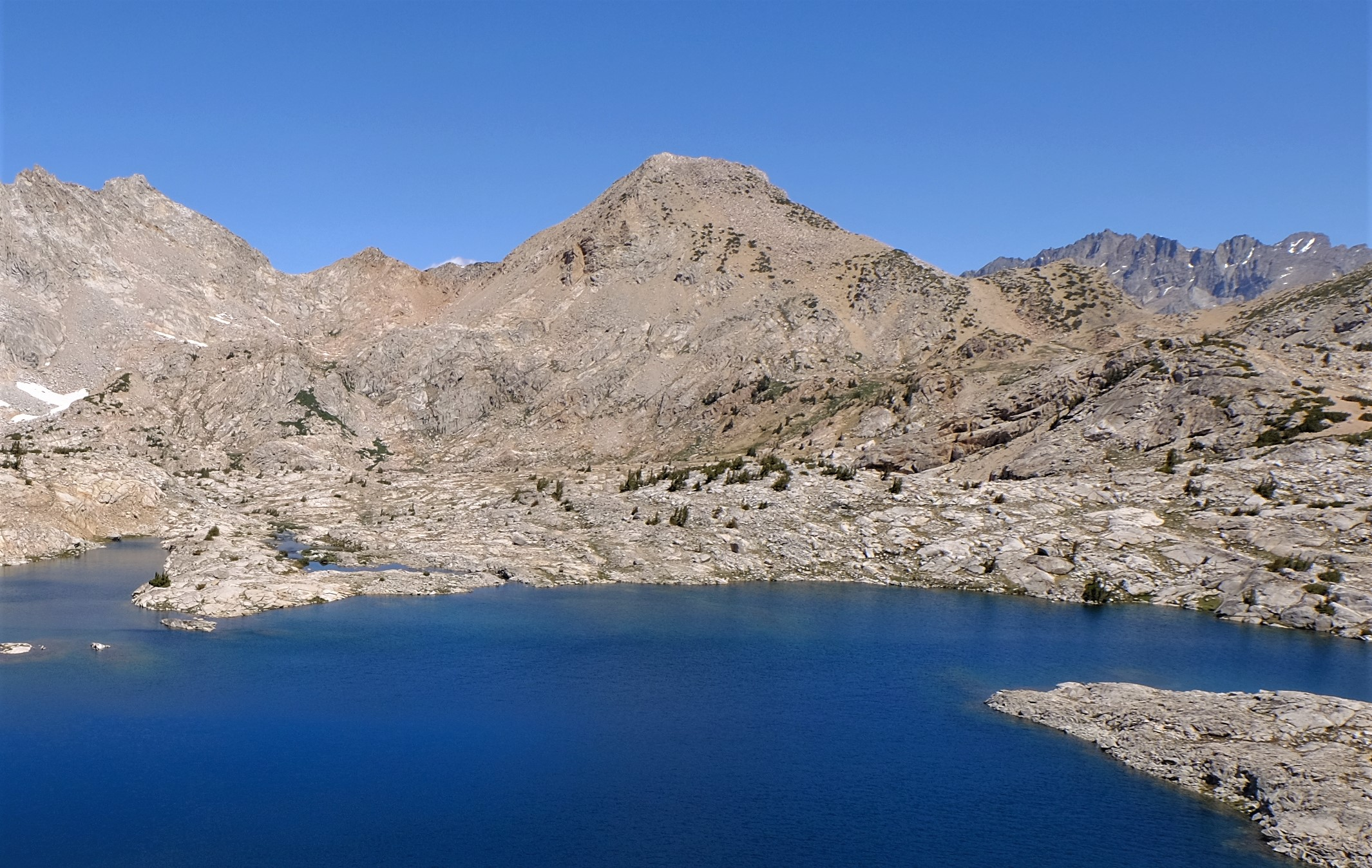
- South aspect, from Dumbbell Lakes

Highest point
- Elevation: 12,362 ft (3,768 m)
- Prominence: 802 ft (244 m)
- Isolation: 1.61 mi (2.59 km)
- Listing: Sierra Peaks Section
- Coordinates: 37°01′24″N 118°31′25″W

Geography
- Location within California Location within the United States
- Location: Kings Canyon National Park; Fresno County, California, U.S.
- Parent range: Sierra Nevada
- Topo map: USGS North Palisade

Geology
- Rock type: granitic

Climbing
- First ascent: 1902 Joseph Nisbet LeConte
- Easiest route: class 2 via Dumbbell Lakes

Observation Peak is a 12,362-foot-elevation (3,768-meter) summit located in Fresno County, California, United States.

== Description ==
The mountain is set five miles west of the crest of the Sierra Nevada mountain range, in the Palisades area of Kings Canyon National Park. It is situated 4.4 miles (7.1 km) southwest of Middle Palisade, and one mile south-southeast of Mount Shakspere. Observation Peak ranks as the 323rd-highest summit in California, and topographic relief is significant as the summit rises 2,400 feet (730 meters) above Cataract Creek in approximately one mile. Precipitation runoff from this mountain drains into tributaries of the Middle Fork Kings River.

== History ==
The first ascent of the summit was made July 25, 1902, by Joseph Nisbet LeConte and Curtis W. Lindley via Dumbbell Lakes. LeConte so named the peak because he used the summit as a triangulation base for mapping the area. This mountain's toponym has been officially adopted by the United States Board on Geographic Names.

== Climate ==
Observation Peak is located in an alpine climate zone. Most weather fronts originate in the Pacific Ocean, and travel east toward the Sierra Nevada mountains. As fronts approach, they are forced upward by the peaks (orographic lift), causing them to drop their moisture in the form of rain or snowfall onto the range.

== Gallery ==
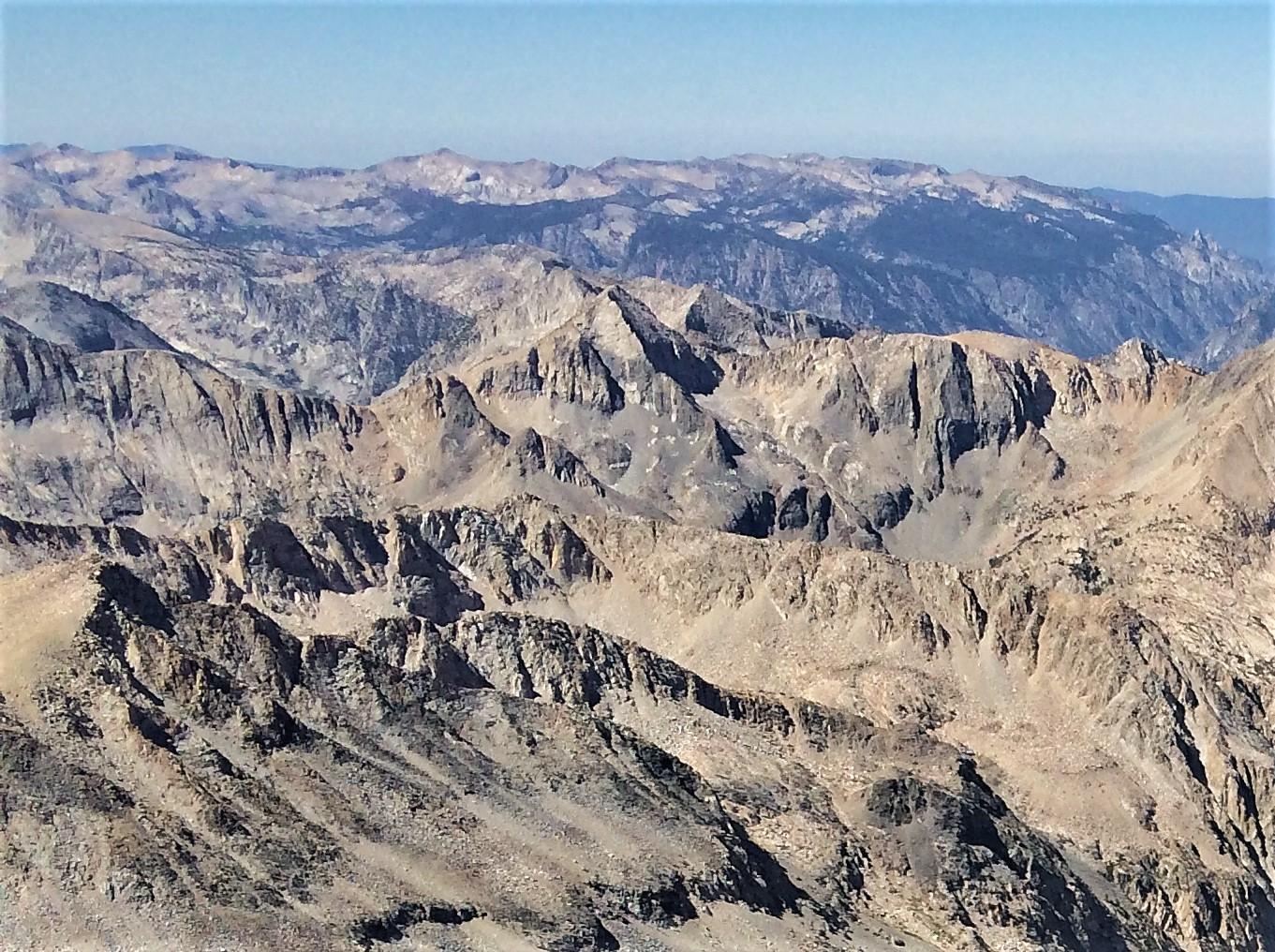
Northeast aspect (centered) from Middle Palisade

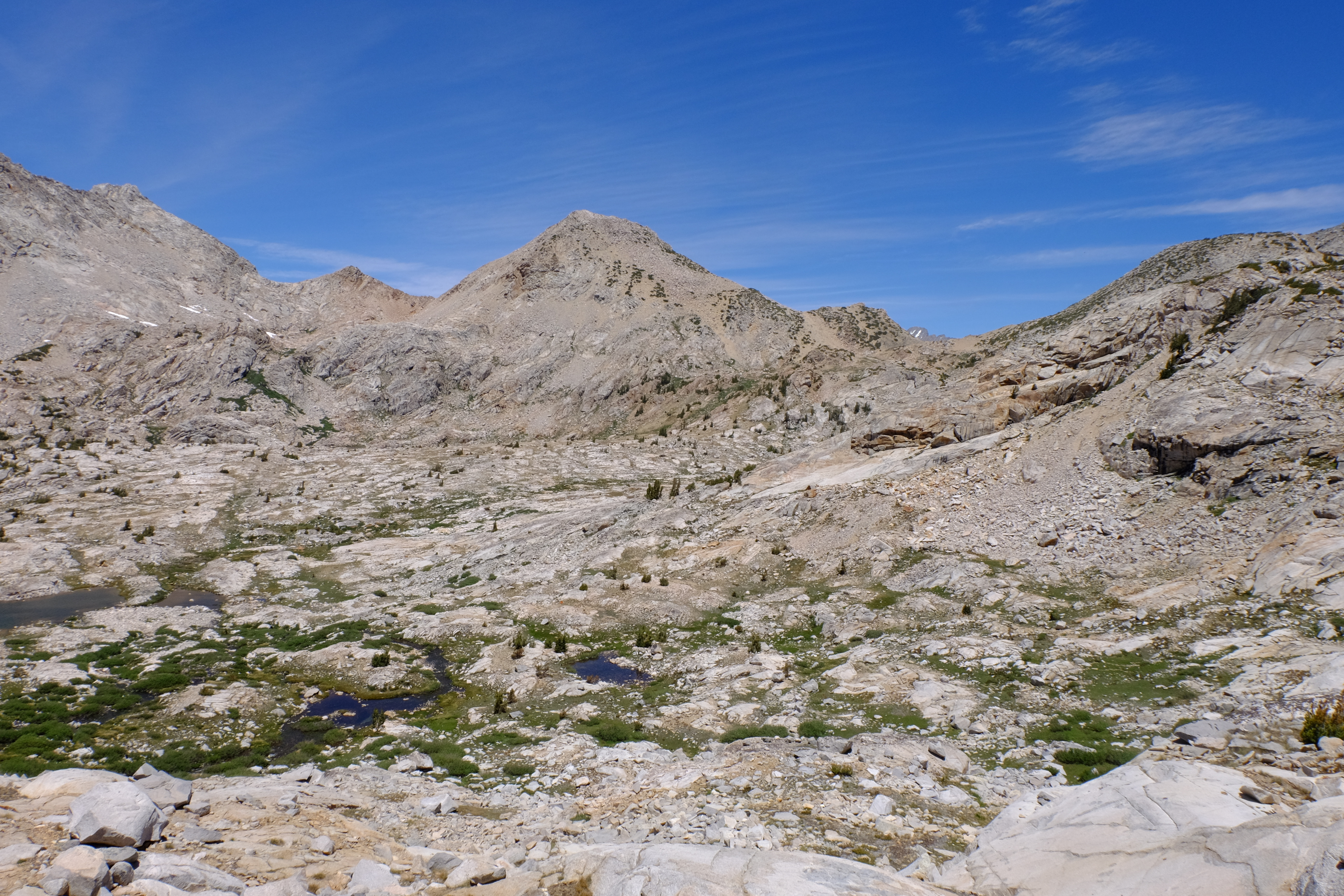
South aspect of Observation Peak (centered)

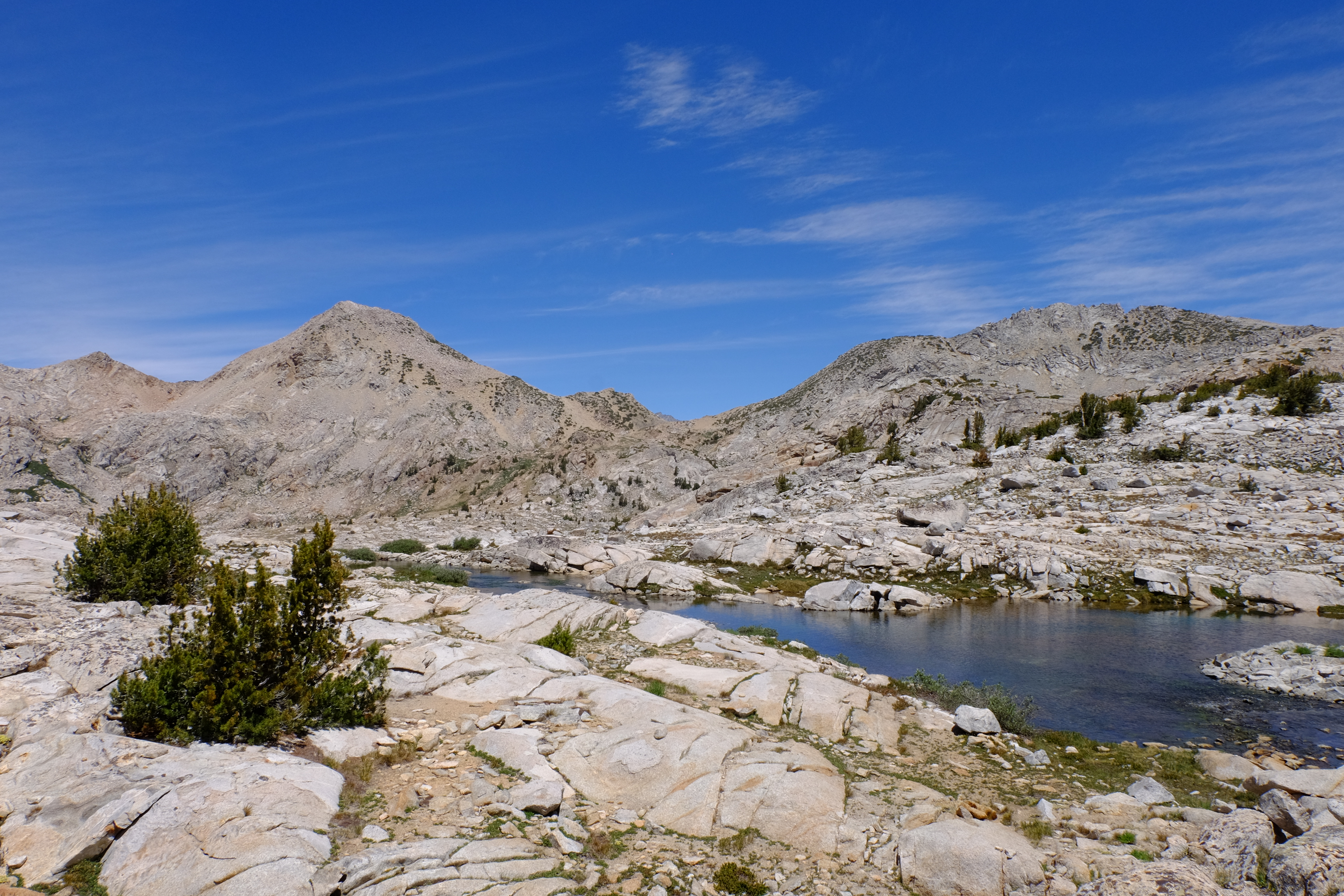
South aspect of Observation Peak (left)

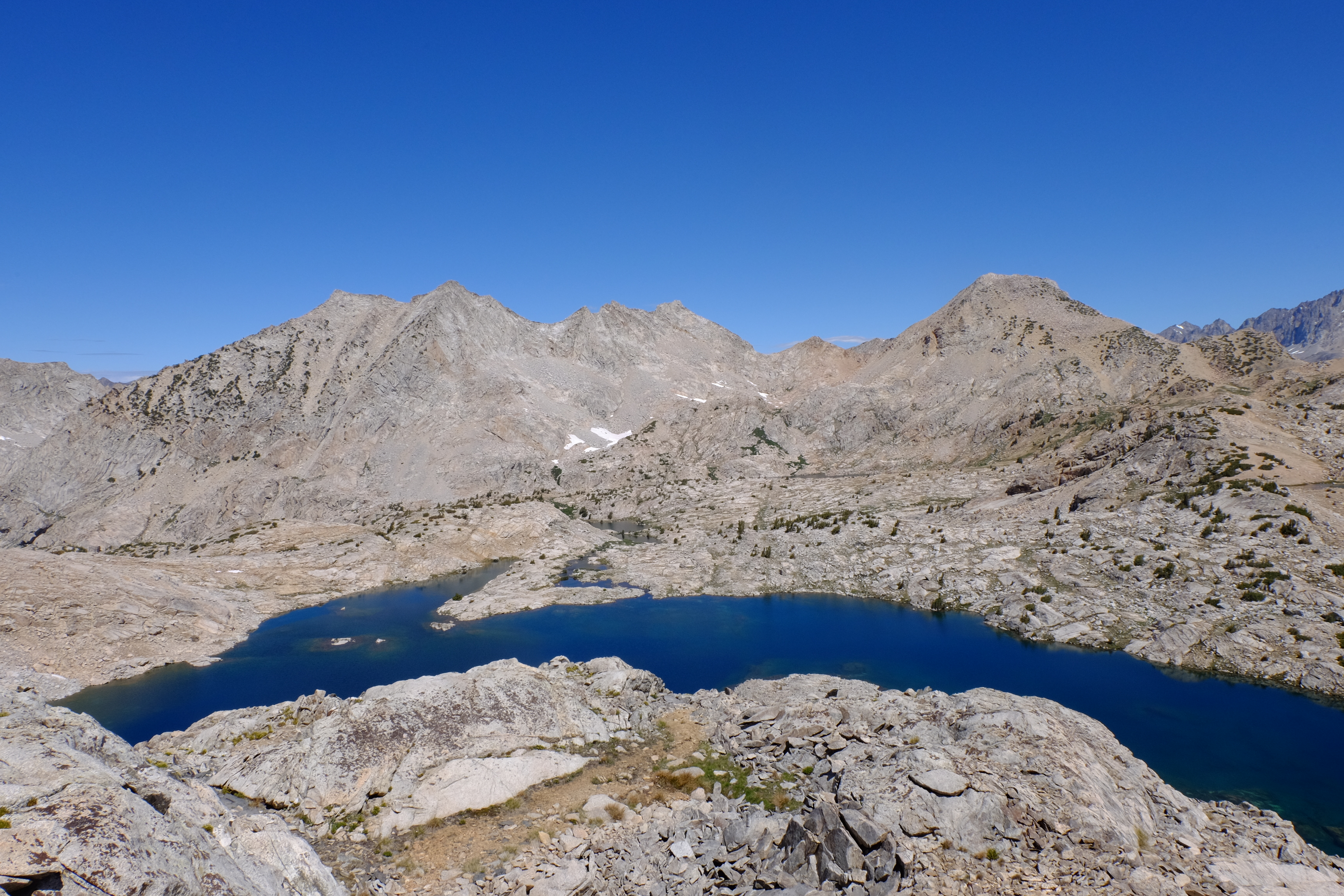
South aspect of Observation Peak (right)

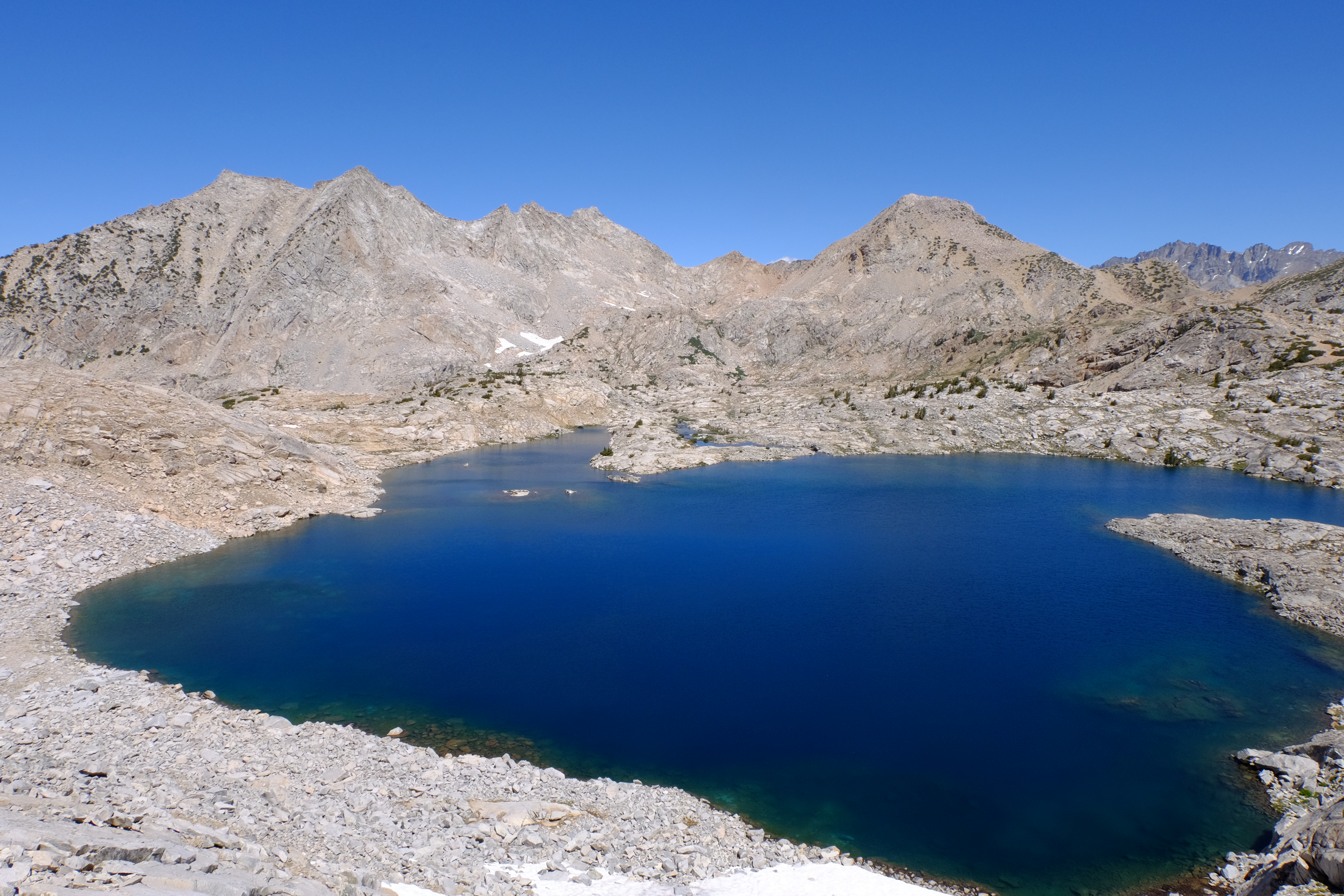
South aspect of Observation Peak (right) with Lower Dumbbell Lake

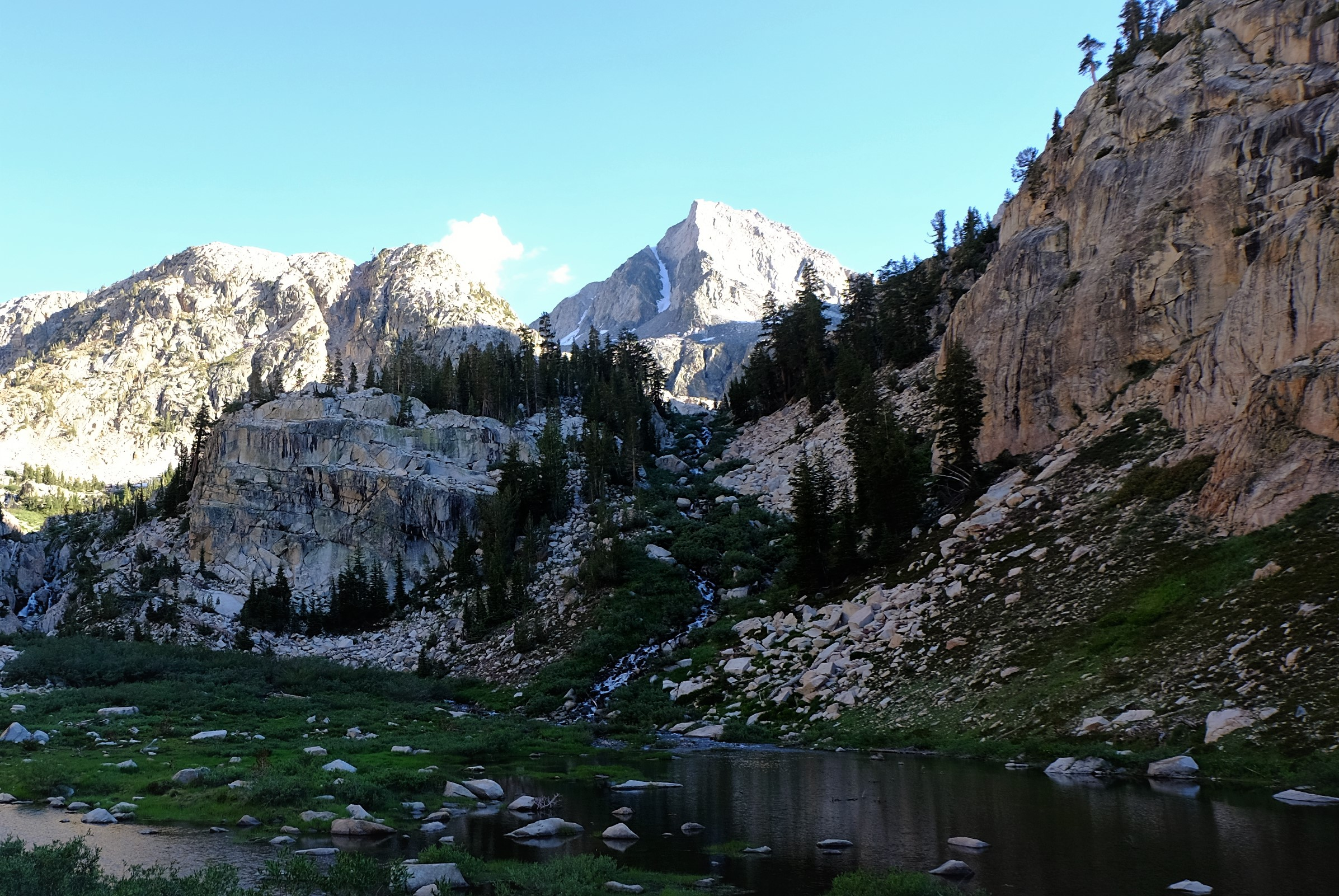
North aspect of Observation Peak seen from Cataract Creek

== See also ==
- Sequoia-Kings Canyon Wilderness
