= Colombian small-eared shrew =

Conservation status
- Least Concern (IUCN 3.1)

Scientific classification
- Kingdom: Animalia
- Phylum: Chordata
- Class: Mammalia
- Order: Eulipotyphla
- Family: Soricidae
- Genus: Cryptotis
- Species: C. colombiana

Binomial name
- Cryptotis colombiana Woodman & Timm, 1993
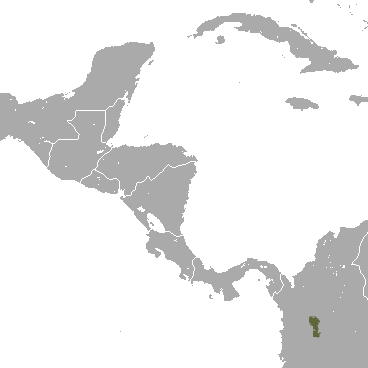
- Colombian small-eared shrew range

Species of mammal

The Colombian small-eared shrew (Cryptotis colombiana) is a species of mammal in the family Soricidae. It is endemic to Colombia, where it is known from the Cordillera Central in Antioquia Department at elevations from 1,750 to 2,800 m (5,740 to 9,190 ft). It is found in montane forest and cultivated areas. It resembles C. brachyonyx.
