= Observation Peak (Alaska) =

Mountain in Alaska, United States

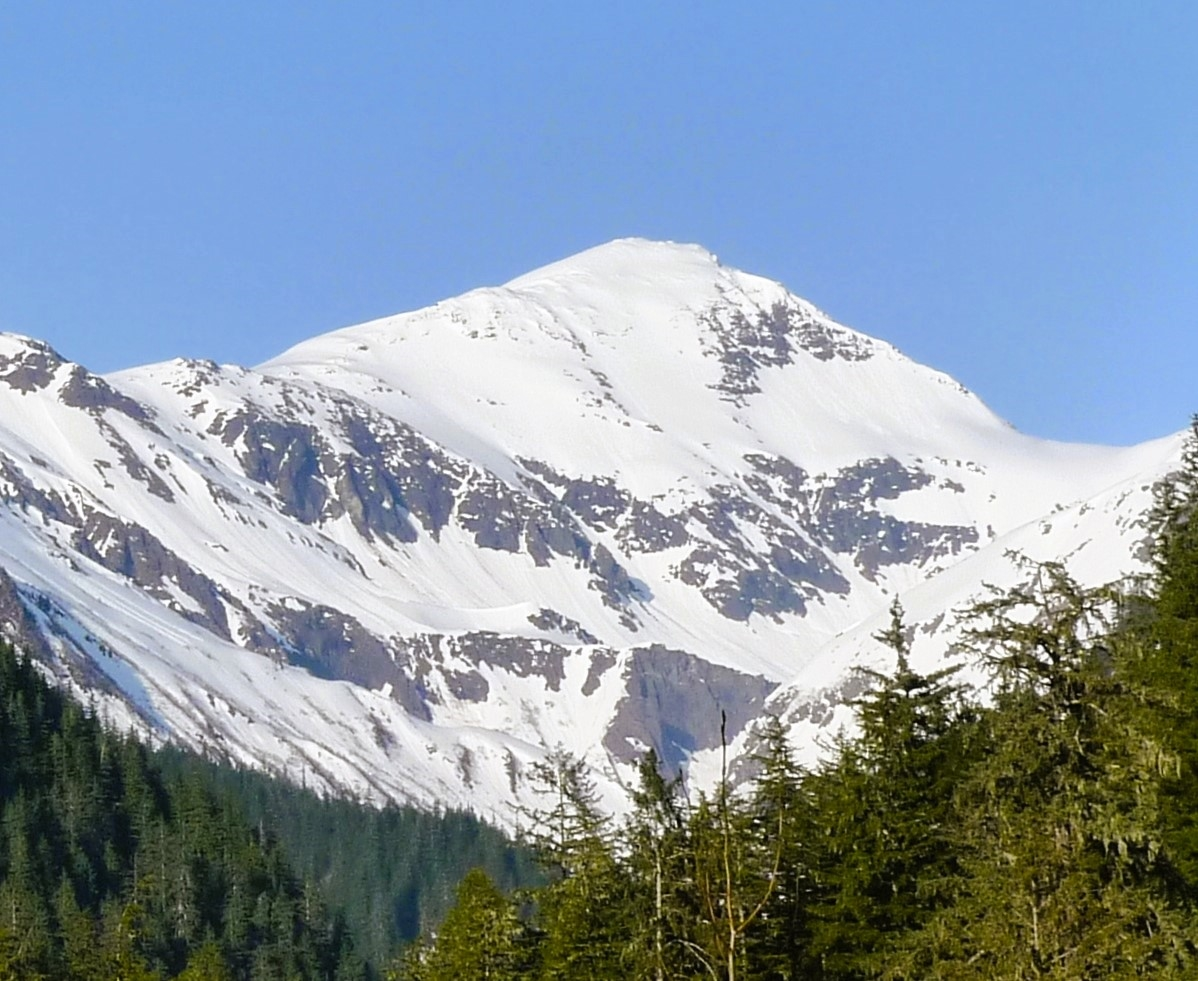
- Southwest aspect

Highest point
- Elevation: 4,931 ft (1,503 m)
- Prominence: 962 ft (293 m)
- Parent peak: Split Thumb (5,523 ft)
- Isolation: 3.68 mi (5.92 km)
- Coordinates: 58°21′20″N 134°20′26″W

Geography
- Location within Alaska
- Country: United States
- State: Alaska
- Borough: Juneau
- Protected area: Tongass National Forest
- Parent range: Coast Mountains; Boundary Ranges; Juneau Icefield
- Topo map: USGS Juneau B-2

Geology
- Rock age: Late Cretaceous
- Rock type: Granitic
- Volcanic arc: Coast Range Arc

Observation Peak is a 4,931-foot (1,503 m) mountain summit located in the Boundary Ranges of the Coast Mountains, in the U.S. state of Alaska. The peak is situated 4.5 miles (7.2 km) northeast of Juneau along the southern periphery of the Juneau Icefield, on land managed by Tongass National Forest. Precipitation runoff and glacial meltwater from the mountain drains to Gastineau Channel via Lemon and Salmon creeks, whereas the southeast slope drains to Taku Inlet via Carlson Creek. Although modest in elevation, relief is significant as the summit rises over 3,700 feet (1,128 m) above Salmon Creek Reservoir in 1.6 miles (2.6 km). This peak's local name was published in 1962 by the U.S. Geological Survey and the toponym has been officially adopted by the U.S. Board on Geographic Names.

== Climate ==
Based on the Köppen climate classification, Observation Peak is located in a subpolar oceanic climate zone, with long, cold, snowy winters, and cool summers. Weather systems coming off the Gulf of Alaska are forced upwards by the Coast Mountains (orographic lift), causing heavy precipitation in the form of rainfall and snowfall. Winter temperatures can drop below 0 °F with wind chill factors below −10 °F. This climate supports the Lemon Creek Glacier on the north slope of the peak.

== See also ==
- Geography of Alaska
