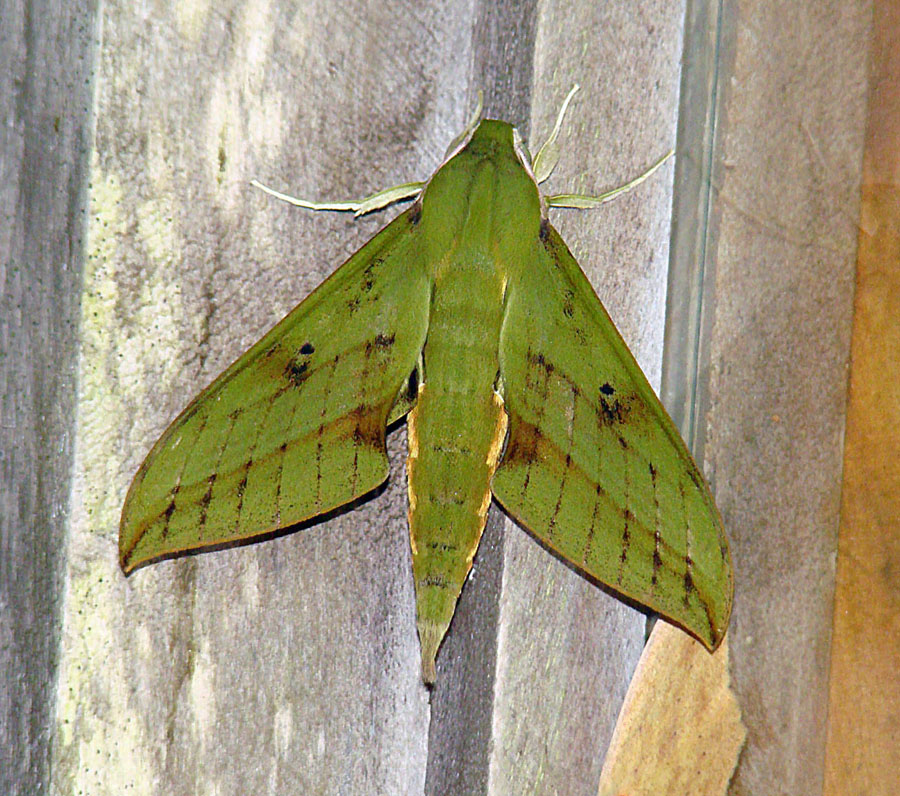

Scientific classification
- Domain: Eukaryota
- Kingdom: Animalia
- Phylum: Arthropoda
- Class: Insecta
- Order: Lepidoptera
- Family: Sphingidae
- Genus: Xylophanes
- Species: X. columbiana

Binomial name
- Xylophanes columbiana Clark, 1935

= Xylophanes columbiana =

Species of moth

Xylophanes columbiana is a moth of the family Sphingidae. It is known from Colombia.

Adults are probably on wing year-round.

The larvae probably feed on Rubiaceae and Malvaceae species.
