= Columbiad (ballet) =

Columbiad is a solo modern dance choreographed by Martha Graham to music by Louis Horst. Edythe Gilfond designed the costume; Philip Stapp created the set. The ballet premiered on December 27, 1939, at the St. James Theatre in New York City. Columbiad's debut was part of an event called the Holiday Dance Festival, which included four additional works by Graham and pieces by the American Ballet Caravan, Carmalita Maracci and Dance Group, and Korean modern dancer Sai Shoki.

== Synopsis ==
Program notes described the work as "an American Ode to Freedom." A quotation from Revolutionary War era poet Timothy Dwight IV was also included:

Columbia, Columbia, to glory arise
The queen of the world, the child of the skies.
To conquest and slaughter let Europe aspire
'Whelm nations in blood, and wrap cities in fire.
Thy heroes the rights of mankind shall defend
And triumphs pursue them and glory attend.

The choreography was basically a slow simple march, during which Graham, dressed in white, flourished red and blue scarves.

== Critical reception ==
The critic for Chicago Dancer thought the work's appearance on the program "unnecessary and repetitious, when American Document says all that it does and so concisely and convincingly." The same reviewer found the "obvious red, white and blue" theme to be "too much." Another called the dance "patriotic propaganda." The critic for American Dancer wrote "it left many in the audience with a feeling of frustration and a growing distaste for modern dance. The entire number seemed confused, jumbled and unimportant."

The New York Times' John Martin had a more favorable opinion, "Though there is nothing in any way new about the vocabulary in which it is couched, a familiar idiom is given fresh values by the beautiful dignity that illuminates it. It is the kind of dance nobody but Martha Graham could possibly make substantial or moving, but she succeeds notably in both directions."
