= Colombo Airport =

Colombo Airport may refer to:

- Bandaranaike International Airport, the main international airport serving Sri Lanka
- Colombo Airport, official name of Ratmalana Airport, the secondary international airport serving the city of Colombo, Sri Lanka
