= HMS Columbine (1806) =

Brig of the Royal Navy

- Columbine

History

United Kingdom
- Name: HMS Columbine
- Ordered: 12 November 1805
- Builder: Balthazar & Edward Admas, Bucklers Hard
- Laid down: January 1806
- Launched: 16 July 1806
- Commissioned: August 1806
- Fate: Wrecked 1824

General characteristics
- Type: Cruizer-class brig-sloop
- Tons burthen: 385 85/94 (bm)
- Length: 100 ft 0 in (30.5 m) (gundeck); 77 ft 1 3/4 in (23.5 m) (keel)
- Beam: 30 ft 8 in (9.3 m)
- Depth of hold: 12 ft 10 in (3.9 m)
- Sail plan: Brig rigged
- Complement: 121
- Armament: 16 × 32-pounder carronades; 2 × 6-pounder bow guns

HMS Columbine was a Cruizer-class brig-sloop launched in 1806. She served on the North America station, in the Mediterranean, off the Portuguese coast, and in the West Indies during the Napoleonic Wars. In 1823 she served briefly off Greece before wrecking off the Peloponnese in 1824.

== Career ==
Commander James Bradshaw commissioned Columbine in August 1806. He then sailed for Halifax on 6 April 1807. In early July Columbine brought to Halifax dispatches concerning the Chesapeake–Leopard affair, which had transpired on 22 June.

Lieutenant George Hills received promotion to commander and command of Columbine on 20 April 1808, replacing Bradshaw.

A mutiny occurred on board Columbine, on 1 August 1809, off St Andrews, New Brunswick. Twenty-two seamen deserted and twenty-three were court martialed. Two of the crew gave evidence against the rest. A court martial found the boatswain, three seamen, and two marines guilty. They were executed on 18 September and afterwards were hung in chains on Meagher's (or Mauger's) Beach, Halifax. The carpenter's mate and six other seamen were condemned to transportation to New South Wales. Hill sailed Columbine back to Britain where she was paid off in March 1810.

In July Commander James Collins recommissioned Columbine. He then sailed her for the Mediterranean on 18 September. On 21 October 1810 he received promotion to post captain. His replacement, on 11 November, was Commander William Shepheard.

On 4 June 1811, near Saint Lucar, Columbine's boats captured a French naval settee, armed with two howitzers and six swivel guns, carrying a crew of 42 men. The settee was Guadalquiver.

Lieutenant George Augustus Westphal took temporary command of Columbine in June 1811 after Admiral Sir Richard Keats appointed Shepheard captain pro temp of the 74-gun Alfred. Columbine was still under Westphal's command on 30 September, when her boats were again active, capturing two French privateers sheltering under the guns of shore batteries at Chipiona, which is about five kilometres (3.1 mi) south west of Saint Lucar and about ten kilometres (6.2 mi) north west of Rota. After about three months Shepheard returned to Columbine.

Admiral Legge, the commander of the British fleet at Cadiz, in mid-October ordered Stately, Tuscan, and Columbine to transport troops to Tarifa. The troops were reinforcements for General Francisco Ballesteros, whose Spanish force was under pressure from the French forces at San Roque. The British squadron transported eight companies each of the 47th and 87th regiments of foot, a detachment of 70 men from the 95th Regiment, and four light artillery pieces. The troops landed on 18 October and the next day the French advanced along the coast. Fire from Tuscan, Stately's boats, and Gunboat 14 sent them into retreat.

In November 1811, Commander Richard H. Muddle replaced Shepheard. Under Muddle, Columbine spent 1812 and 1813 on the Portuguese coast.

On 11 August 1812, Columbine detained the American ship Louisa, which was condemned as a "droit of the Crown". (Note: A first-class share of the proceeds was worth £94 2s 2 1/4d; a sixth-class share, that of an ordinary seaman, was worth £2 2s 1 1/2d.)

On 14 April 1813, Columbine recaptured Active, and shared the capture with Magicienne. (Note: For the crew of Magicienne, a first-class share of the proceeds was worth £60 9s 9 1/2d; a sixth-class share was worth 16s 6 1/2d. The prize money notice stated that Columbine's crew had already been paid, and overpaid at that.)

In 1814 Columbine, was on the West Indies station. At some point she and the frigate Ister captured the slaver Atrivedo, Catellanos, master. Atrivedo had sailed from Barbados to Guadeloupe. The seizure resulted in the rescue of 90 male slaves, 71 women, and 111 children.

On 16 March Columbine was in the Demerara River when Muddle awarded W. Hill, master of the ship Liverpool, a letter of approbation and a pendant to fly from her mast. Liverpool had repulsed an attack by the notorious, and usually more successful, American privateer Snap Dragon in a five-hour action. The pendant was a signal to all British warships to respect Liverpool's crew, i.e., not to press them.

On 8 March 1813 Columbine was in sight and approaching when Barbados captured the American privateer Avon.

== Post-war ==
Between November 1818 and January 1820, Columbine underwent repairs at Plymouth. Then between April and September 1823 she underwent fitting there for sea duty. Commander the Honourable Charles Abbot commissioned her in September, and later sailed her for the Mediterranean, where she operated off the west coast of Greece.

Columbine destroyed a pirate vessel on 26 November 1823, after removing the pirate's 25-man crew. At some point Columbine captured another pirate vessel that was sold at Carigo. (Note: Carigo is probably Cerigo, a former Venetian possession now known as Cythera.) In November 1827 bounty money for the captured men and prize money for the vessel was due for payment. (Note: A first-class share was worth £52 1s 9 1/4d; a sixth-class share was worth 12s 3 3/4d.)

== Loss ==
On 25 January 1824, Columbine wrecked on Sapientza Island, which is off the southern coast of the Peloponnese, near the city of Methóni. She had sailed from Corfu on 15 January and had arrived at the island on 19 January. Abbott initially went on shore to conduct a survey of the harbour and anchored her off Port Longue. On the night of the 24th, the weather worsened and her single anchor did not hold her securely, with the result that she drove onto a reef and foundered. Almost all her crew survived, having clambered onto the rocks; two crew members were lost. The subsequent court martial reprimanded Abbott and the master, James Atkinson, for having used only one anchor and for not having prepared for the eventuality of bad weather.

Another account reports that The Turkish garrison at Modon, though itself ill-provisioned, sent supplies that permitted the crew to subsist until Alacrity could retrieve them.
