= Columbian School =

Columbian School may refer to the following schools in the United States:

(by state)

- Columbian School (Louisville, Kentucky), listed on the NRHP in Kentucky
- Columbian School (Omaha, Nebraska), listed on the NRHP in Nebraska
- Columbian School (Raton, New Mexico), listed on the NRHP in New Mexico
