= Columbine Peak =

Mountain in California, United States

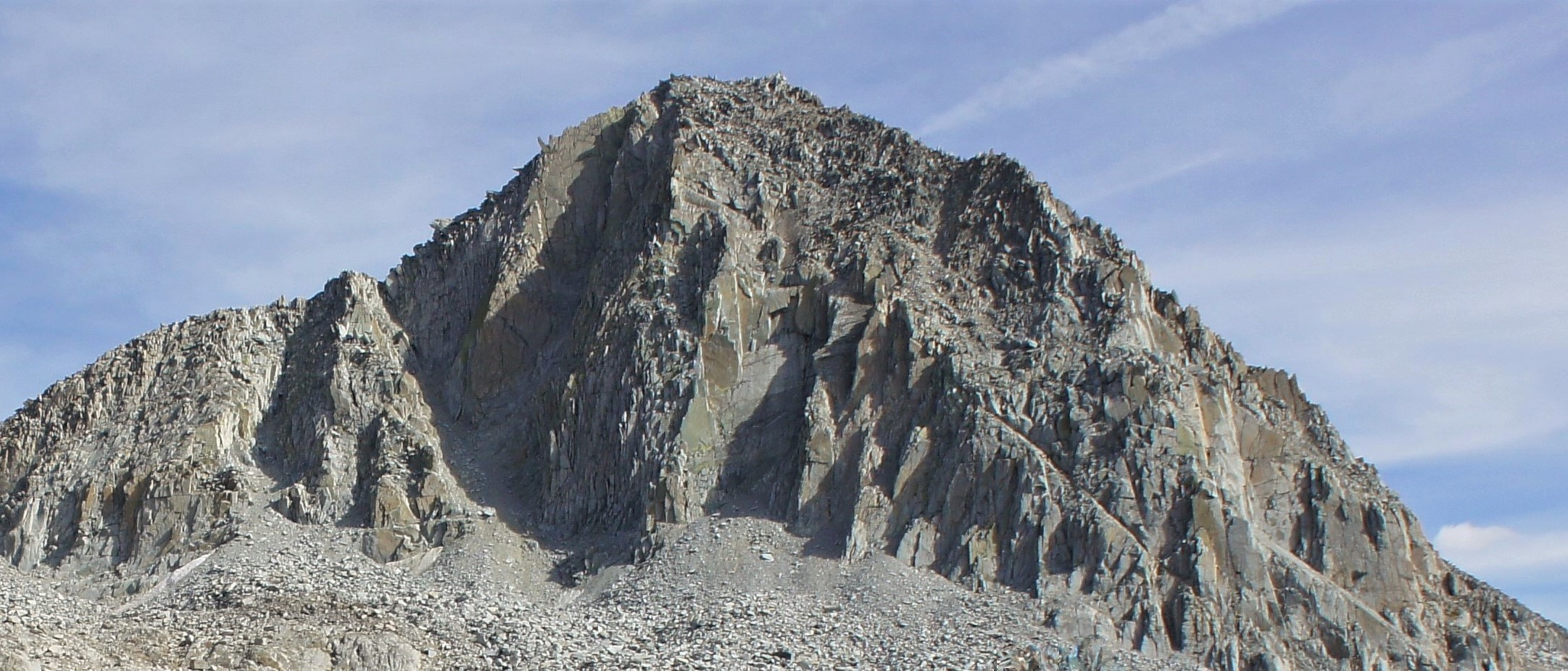
- West aspect

Highest point
- Elevation: 12,662 ft (3,859 m)
- Prominence: 542 ft (165 m)
- Parent peak: North Palisade (14,242 ft)
- Isolation: 1.37 mi (2.20 km)
- Coordinates: 37°05′21″N 118°32′30″W

Geography
- Location within California Location within the United States
- Country: United States
- State: California
- County: Fresno
- Protected area: Kings Canyon National Park
- Parent range: Sierra Nevada; Palisades
- Topo map: USGS North Palisade

Geology
- Rock type: granite

Climbing
- First ascent: < 1925
- Easiest route: class 2 by northeast or south ridge

Columbine Peak is a 12,662-foot-elevation (3,859-meter) mountain summit located 1.5 miles (2.4 km) west of the crest of the Sierra Nevada mountain range, in Fresno County of northern California, United States. It is situated between Palisade Basin and Dusy Basin in the Palisades area of northern Kings Canyon National Park. It is 1.54 miles (2.48 km) west of North Palisade, 2 miles (3.2 km) south of Bishop Pass, and immediately north of Knapsack Pass. This mountain's name has been officially adopted by the United States Board on Geographic Names. The first ascent of the summit was made prior to 1925 by persons unknown.

== Climate ==
According to the Köppen climate classification system, Columbine Peak is located in an alpine climate zone. Most weather fronts originate in the Pacific Ocean, and travel east toward the Sierra Nevada mountains. As fronts approach, they are forced upward by the peaks, causing them to drop their moisture in the form of rain or snowfall onto the range (orographic lift). Precipitation runoff from this mountain drains into tributaries of the Middle Fork Kings River.

== Gallery ==
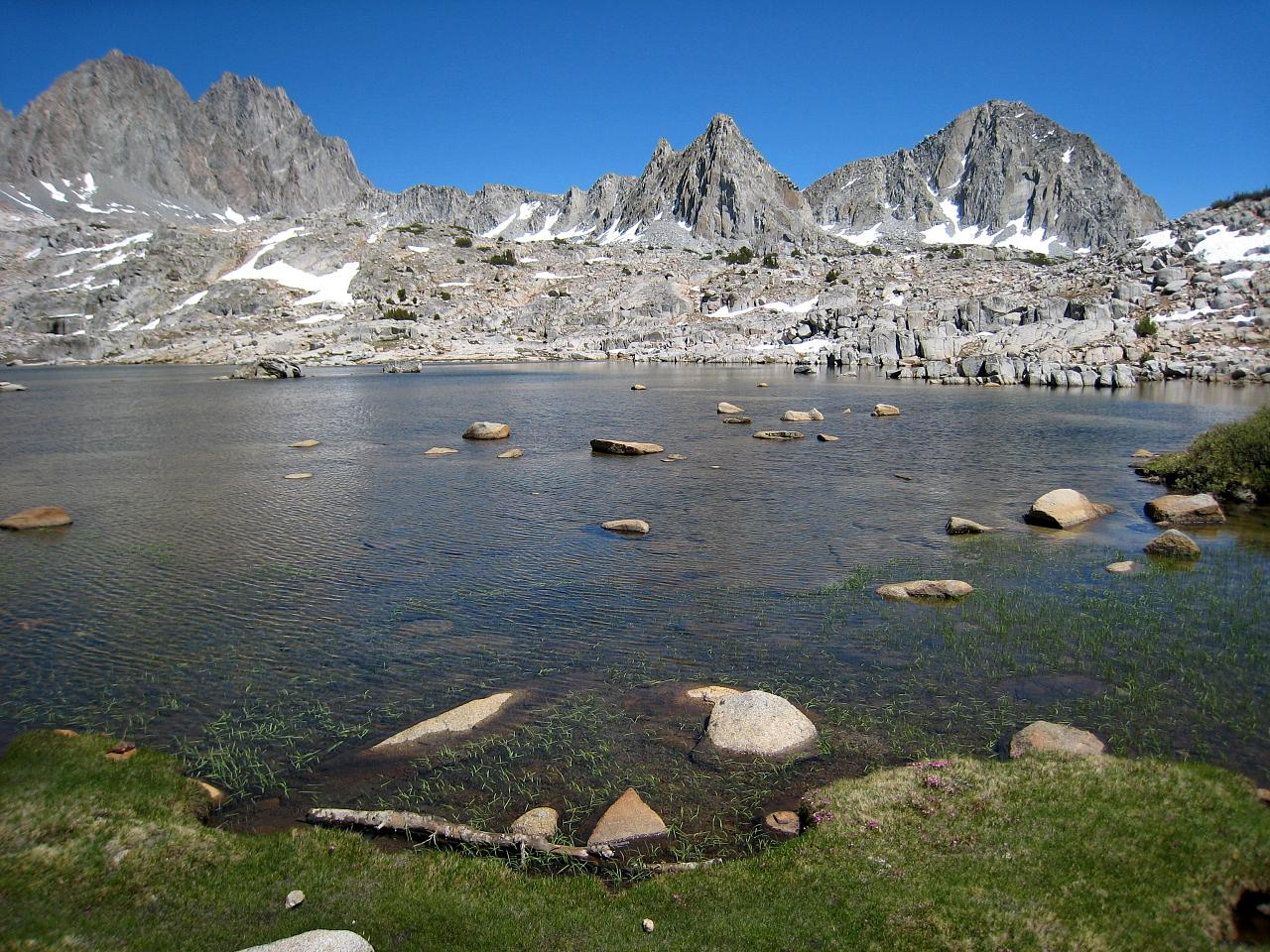
Columbine Peak (right) from Dusy Basin

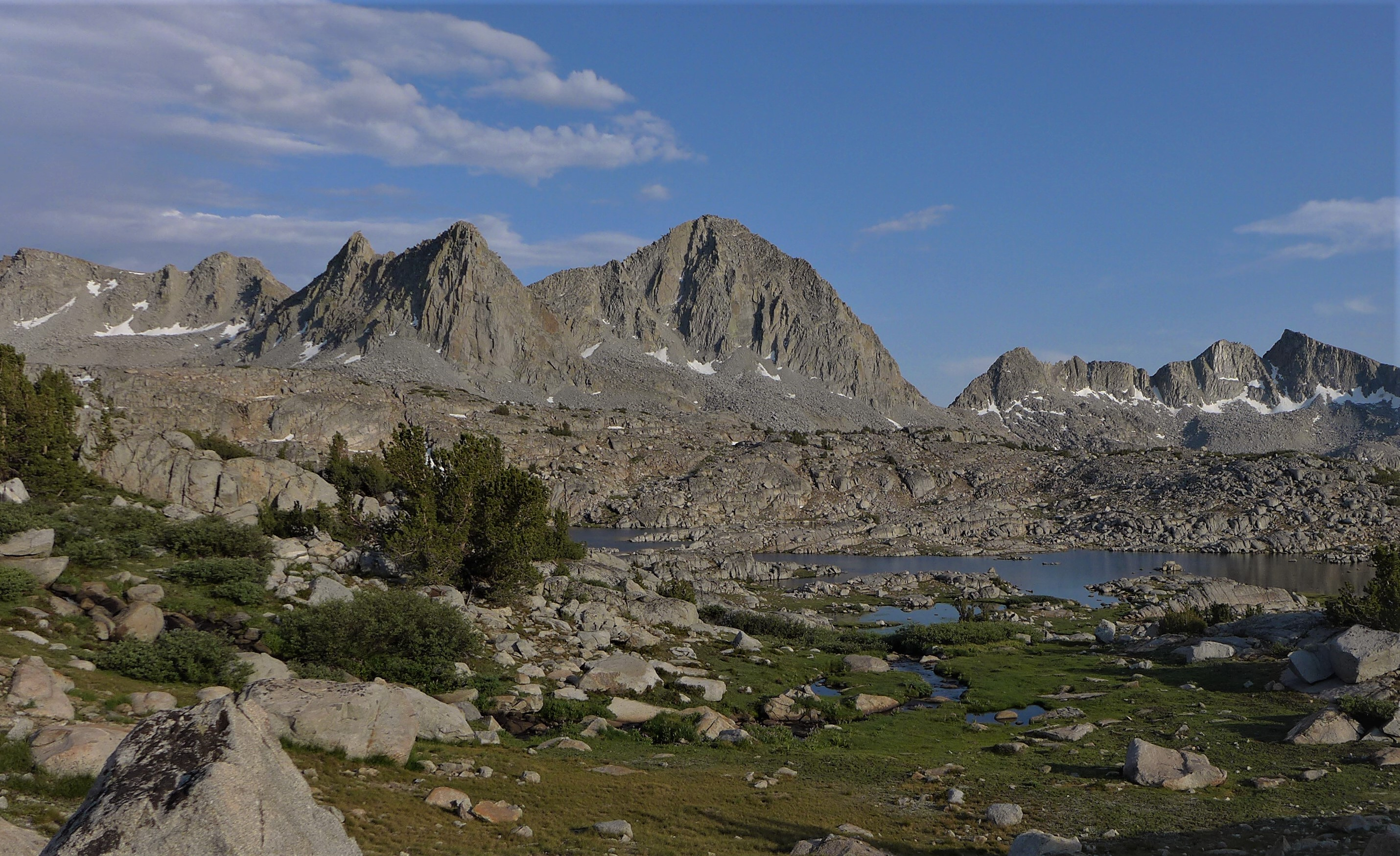
Columbine Peak (centered) from Dusy Basin. Isosceles Peak to left.

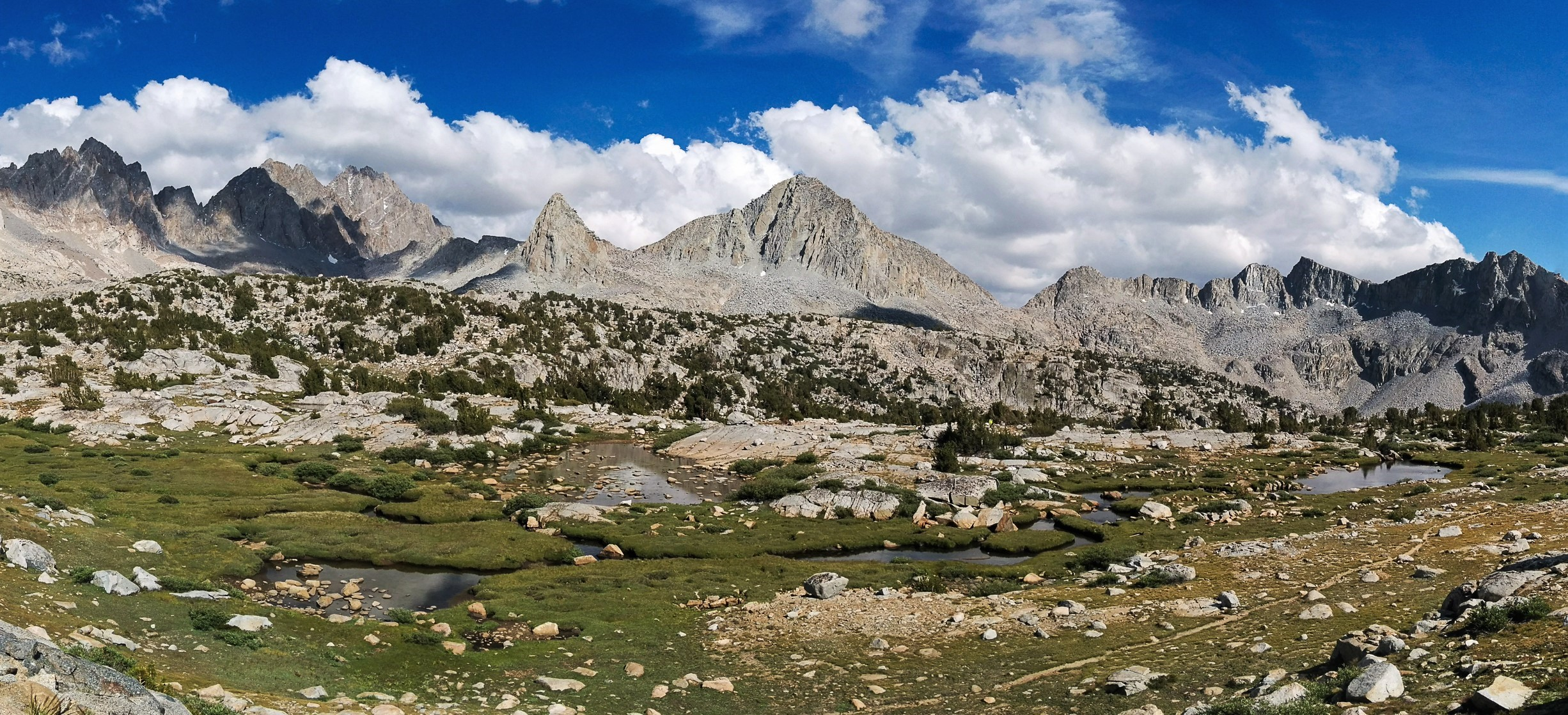
Columbine Peak (centered) from Dusy Basin.

== See also ==
- List of mountain peaks of California
