= Colombia (disambiguation) =

Colombia is a country in northwestern South America.

Colombia may also refer to:

== Former nations ==
- Gran Colombia, a former nation, officially the Republic of Colombia, 1819–31
- United States of Colombia, a former name for Colombia, 1863–86

== Cities, towns, and communities ==
- Colômbia, a city in São Paulo, Brazil
- Colombia, Cuba, a municipality in Las Tunas, Cuba
- Colombia, Huila, a city and municipality in Colombia
- Colombia, Nuevo León, a planned community in Mexico

== Other uses ==
- Colombia (Madrid Metro), a station on Line 8 and 9

== See also ==
- Columbia (disambiguation)
- Colombian (disambiguation)
- Colombiana (disambiguation)
- Colombo (disambiguation)
- Columbian (disambiguation)
- Columbiana (disambiguation)
- Columbus (disambiguation)
