= Columbiana =

Columbiana may refer to:

== Taxonomy ==
In botany:

- Arctostaphylos columbiana or hairy manzanita, a plant species native to North America
- Calatola columbiana, a species of plant in the family Icacinaceae endemic to Colombia
- Clematis columbiana, a species of flowering plant in the buttercup genus Clematis
- Crataegus columbiana, a species of hawthorn plant native to North America
- Lewisia columbiana or Columbian lewisia, a species of flowering plant in the purslane family
- Wolffia columbiana or Columbian watermeal, a perennial aquatic plant in the duckweed family

In zoology:

- Columbiana (planthopper), a genus of planthoppers in the subfamily Delphacinae
- Dictyna columbiana, a Dictynidae species of spider
- Nucifraga columbiana or Clark's nutcracker, a species of passerine bird in the family Corvidae
- Sicalis columbiana or orange-fronted yellow-finch, a species of bird in the family Emberizidae
- Xylophanes columbiana, a species of moth in the family Sphingidae

== Places ==
In U.S. places:

- Columbiana, Alabama
- Columbiana, Ohio
  - Columbiana Exempted Village School District, a school district in Ohio
  - Columbiana High School
- Columbiana County, Ohio
  - Columbiana County Airport, an airport in Ohio
- Columbiana Centre, a shopping mall in Columbia, South Carolina

== See also ==
- Central Columbiana and Pennsylvania Railway or Youngstown and Southeastern Railroad
- Colombia (disambiguation)
- Colombian (disambiguation)
- Colombiana (disambiguation)
- Columbia (disambiguation)
- Columbian (disambiguation)
