= Colombiana (disambiguation) =

Colombiana is a 2011 French-American action film.

Colombiana may also refer to:

- Colombiana (cola)
- Compañía Colombiana Automotriz, an automobile manufacturing company
- Pleurothallis or Colombiana, a genus of orchids

== See also ==
- Colombia (disambiguation)
- Colombian (disambiguation)
- Columbia (disambiguation)
- Columbian (disambiguation)
- Columbiana (disambiguation)
- Colombina (disambiguation)
