= Index of Alaska-related articles =

The location of the state of Alaska in relation to the rest of the United States of America

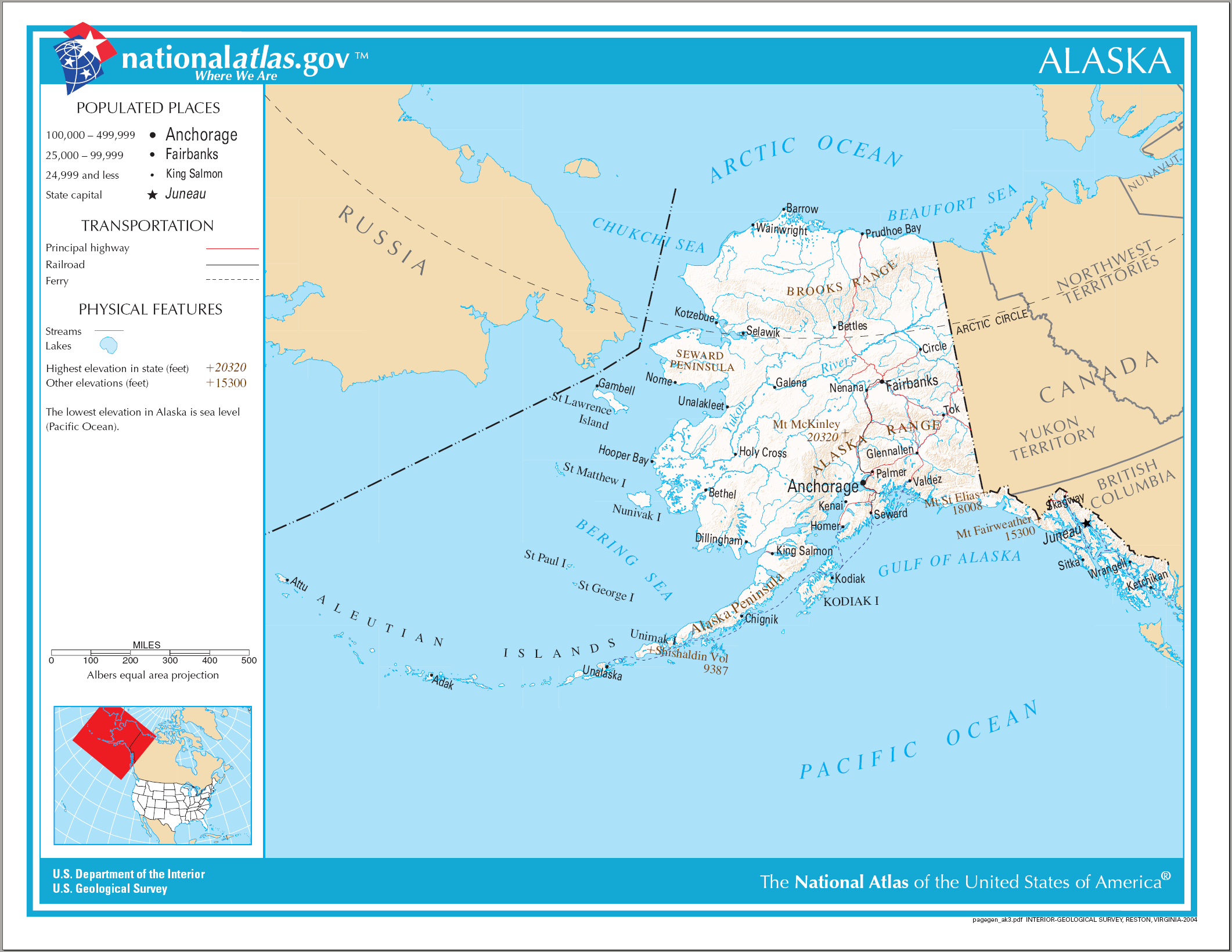
An enlargeable map of the state of Alaska

The flag of the state of Alaska

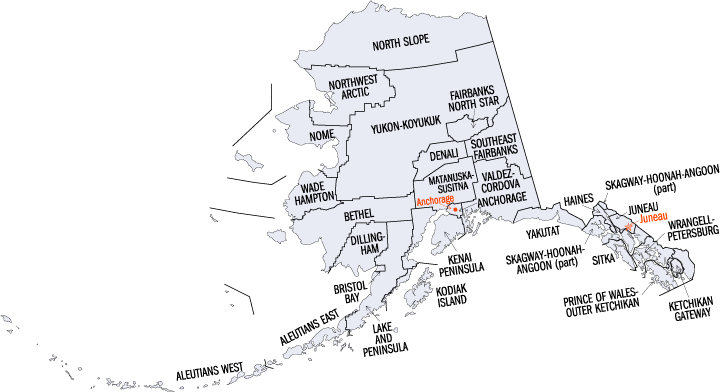
An enlargeable map of the boroughs and census areas of the state of Alaska

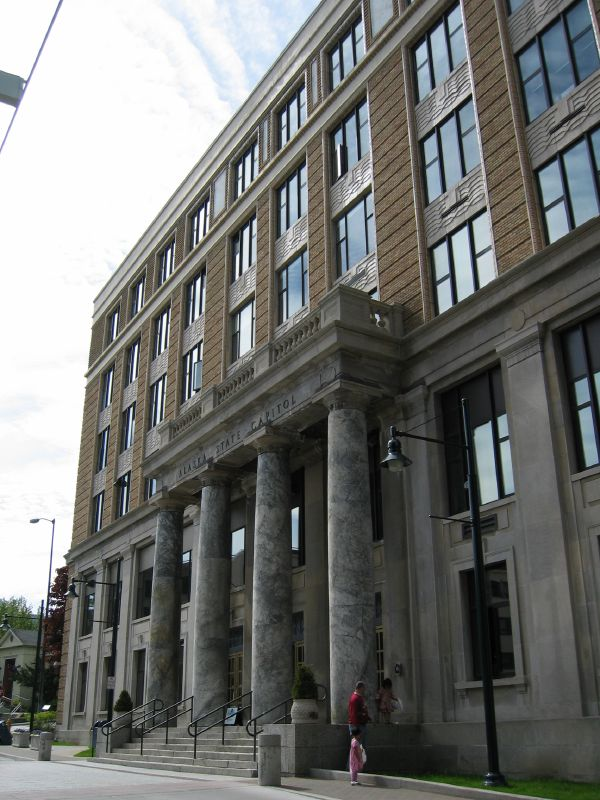
The Alaska State Capitol in Juneau

The following is an alphabetical list of articles related to Alaska.

== 0–9 ==
- .ak.us – Internet second-level domain for the state of Alaska
- 49th State to join the United States of America
- 54°40′ parallel north
- 100 km isolated peaks of Alaska
- 100Stone
- 141st meridian west
- 1500 meter prominent peaks of Alaska
- 4000 meter peaks of Alaska

== A ==
- Adjacent province and territory:
  - Province of British Columbia
  - Territory of Yukon
- Agriculture in Alaska
  - Category:Agriculture in Alaska
- Airports in Alaska
- AK – United States Postal Service postal code for the state of Alaska
- Alaska website
  - Category:Alaska
    - commons:Category:Alaska
      - commons:Category:Maps of Alaska
- Alaska 1741–1953
- Alaska Immigration Justice Project
- Alaska lunar sample displays
- Alaska Purchase of 1867
- Alaska State Capitol
- Alaska State Troopers
- Alaska Territorial Guard
- Anchorage, Alaska
- Aquaria in Alaska
  - commons:Category:Aquaria in Alaska
- Archaeology in Alaska
  - Category:Archaeological sites in Alaska
    - commons:Category:Archaeological sites in Alaska
- Architecture in Alaska
- Area codes in Alaska
- Art museums and galleries in Alaska
  - commons:Category:Art museums and galleries in Alaska
- Astronomical observatories in Alaska
  - commons:Category:Astronomical observatories in Alaska
- Athletes from Alaska
- Spanish expeditions to the Pacific Northwest, 1744–1792

== B ==
- Barrow Area Information Database
- Battle of the Aleutian Islands, 1942–1943
- Botanical gardens in Alaska
  - commons:Category:Botanical gardens in Alaska
- Boroughs and census areas of the state of Alaska
  - commons:Category:Boroughs in Alaska
- Buildings and structures in Alaska
  - commons:Category:Buildings and structures in Alaska

== C ==
- Capital of the State of Alaska
- Capitol of the State of Alaska
  - commons:Category:Alaska State Capitol
- Census statistical areas of Alaska
- Cities in Alaska
  - commons:Category:Cities in Alaska
- Climate of Alaska
  - Category:Climate of Alaska
    - commons:Category:Climate of Alaska
- Climate change in Alaska
- Colleges and universities in Alaska
  - commons:Category:Universities and colleges in Alaska
- Coming into the Country – a 1976 nonfiction book by John McPhee
- Communications in Alaska
  - commons:Category:Communications in Alaska
- Companies in Alaska
  - Category:Companies based in Alaska
- Constitution of the State of Alaska
- Culture of Alaska
  - Category:Culture of Alaska
    - commons:Category:Alaska culture

== D ==
- Demographics of Alaska
  - Category:Demographics of Alaska
- Department of Alaska, 1867–1884
- District of Alaska, 1884–1912

== E ==
- Economy of Alaska
  - Category:Economy of Alaska
    - commons:Category:Economy of Alaska
- Education in Alaska
  - Category:Education in Alaska
    - commons:Category:Education in Alaska
- Elections in the state of Alaska
  - Category:Elections in Alaska
    - commons:Category:Elections in Alaska
- Energy in Alaska
  - Category:Energy in Alaska
- Environment of Alaska
  - commons:Category:Environment of Alaska
- Exxon Valdez oil spill of 1989

== F ==
- Festivals in Alaska
  - commons:Category:Festivals in Alaska
- Fjords of Alaska
  - commons:Category:Fjords of Alaska
- Flag of the state of Alaska
- Flora of Alaska
- Forts in Alaska
  - Category:Forts in Alaska
    - commons:Category:Forts in Alaska

== G ==
- Gardening in Alaska
- Geography of Alaska
  - Category:Geography of Alaska
    - commons:Category:Geography of Alaska
- Geology of Alaska
  - commons:Category:Geology of Alaska
- Ghost towns in Alaska
  - Category:Ghost towns in Alaska
    - commons:Category:Ghost towns in Alaska
- Glaciers of Alaska
- Gold mining in Alaska
- Good Friday earthquake of 1964
- Government of the state of Alaska website
  - Category:Government of Alaska
    - commons:Category:Government of Alaska
- Governor of the State of Alaska
  - List of governors of Alaska
- Great Seal of the State of Alaska

== H ==
- Heritage railroads in Alaska
  - commons:Category:Heritage railroads in Alaska
- High schools of Alaska
- Higher education in Alaska
- Highest major peaks of Alaska
- Highway routes in Alaska
- Hiking trails in Alaska
  - commons:Category:Hiking trails in Alaska
- History of Alaska
  - Historical outline of Alaska
    - Category:History of Alaska
      - commons:Category:History of Alaska
- Hospitals in Alaska
- Hot springs of Alaska
  - commons:Category:Hot springs of Alaska
- House of Representatives of the State of Alaska

== I ==
- Images of Alaska
  - commons:Category:Alaska
- Islands of Alaska

== J ==
- Juneau, Alaska, capital of Alaska since 1906

== K ==
Kiska

== L ==
- Lakes in Alaska
  - commons:Category:Lakes of Alaska
- Landmarks in Alaska
  - commons:Category:Landmarks in Alaska
- Languages of Alaska
- Lieutenant Governor of the State of Alaska
- Lists related to the state of Alaska:
  - List of airports in Alaska
  - List of athletes from Alaska
  - List of birds of Aleutian Islands
  - List of census statistical areas in Alaska
  - List of cities in Alaska
  - List of colleges and universities in Alaska
  - List of companies in Alaska
  - List of counties in Alaska
  - List of forts in Alaska
  - List of ghost towns in Alaska
  - List of governors of Alaska
  - List of high schools in Alaska
  - List of highway routes in Alaska
  - List of hospitals in Alaska
  - List of islands of Alaska
  - List of law enforcement agencies in Alaska
  - List of lieutenant governors of Alaska
  - List of mountains of Alaska
    - List of 4000 meter peaks of Alaska
    - List of mountain peaks of Alaska
  - List of museums in Alaska
  - List of National Historic Landmarks in Alaska
  - List of National Parks in Alaska
  - List of people from Alaska
  - List of places in Alaska
  - List of power stations in Alaska
  - List of radio stations in Alaska
  - List of railroads in Alaska
  - List of Registered Historic Places in Alaska
  - List of rivers in Alaska
  - List of school districts in Alaska
  - List of state forests in Alaska
  - List of state parks in Alaska
  - List of state prisons in Alaska
  - List of state symbols of Alaska
  - List of telephone area codes in Alaska
  - List of television stations in Alaska
  - List of towns in Alaska
  - List of Alaska's congressional delegations
  - List of United States congressional district of Alaska
  - List of United States representatives from Alaska
  - List of United States senators from Alaska

== M ==
- Maps of Alaska
  - commons:Category:Maps of Alaska
- Mass media in Alaska
- Mountain peaks of Alaska
  - The 50 Highest major peaks of Alaska
    - The 20 4000 meter peaks of Alaska
  - The 50 Most prominent peaks of Alaska
    - The 65 Ultra prominent peaks of Alaska
  - The 50 Most isolated major peaks of Alaska
    - The 38 100 km isolated peaks of Alaska
  - Category:Mountains of Alaska
    - commons:Category:Mountains of Alaska
- Museums in Alaska
  - Category:Museums in Alaska
    - commons:Category:Museums in Alaska
- Music of Alaska
  - Category:Music of Alaska
    - commons:Category:Music of Alaska
  - Category:Musical groups from Alaska
  - Category:Musicians from Alaska

== N ==
- National forests of Alaska
  - commons:Category:National Forests of Alaska
- National monuments of Alaska
  - commons:Category:National monuments of Alaska
- Natural gas in Alaska
- Natural history of Alaska
  - commons:Category:Natural history of Alaska
- Newspapers of Alaska
- Novo-Arkhangelsk, capital of Russian Alaska 1808–1867

== O ==
- Outside (Alaska) — common Alaska term for a non-Alaskan location

== P ==
- Parallel 54°40′ north
- People from Alaska
  - Category:People from Alaska
    - commons:Category:People from Alaska
    - Category:People from Alaska by populated place
    - Category:People from Alaska by occupation
- Places in Alaska
- Politics of Alaska
  - Category:Politics of Alaska
    - commons:Category:Politics of Alaska
- Power cost equalization
- Power stations in Alaska
- Prehistory of Alaska
- Protected areas of Alaska
  - commons:Category:Protected areas of Alaska

== Q ==
- Quinhagak, Alaska
- Quinn-Davidson, Austin

== R ==
- Radio stations in Alaska
- Railroads in Alaska
- Registered historic places in Alaska
  - commons:Category:Registered Historic Places in Alaska
- Religion in Alaska
  - Category:Religion in Alaska
    - commons:Category:Religion in Alaska
- Rivers of Alaska
  - commons:Category:Rivers of Alaska
- Russian Alaska, 1741–1867

== S ==
- Scouting in Alaska
- Settlements in Alaska
  - Cities in Alaska
  - Census Designated Places in Alaska
  - Other unincorporated communities in Alaska
  - List of ghost towns in Alaska
  - List of places in Alaska
- Sitka, Alaska, capital of Alaska 1808–1906
- Ski areas and resorts in Alaska
  - commons:Category:Ski areas and resorts in Alaska
- Solar power in Alaska
- Spanish expeditions to Alaska
- Sports in Alaska
  - commons:Category:Sports in Alaska
- Sports venues in Alaska
  - commons:Category:Sports venues in Alaska
- State Capitol of Alaska
- State of Alaska website
  - Constitution of the State of Alaska
  - Government of the state of Alaska
    - Category:Government of Alaska
      - commons:Category:Government of Alaska
  - Executive branch of the government of the state of Alaska
    - Governor of the State of Alaska
  - Legislative branch of the government of the State of Alaska
    - Legislature of the State of Alaska
      - Senate of the State of Alaska
      - House of Representatives of the State of Alaska
  - Judicial branch of the government of the State of Alaska
    - Supreme Court of the State of Alaska
- State parks of Alaska
  - commons:Category:State parks of Alaska
- State prisons of Alaska
- Structures in Alaska
  - commons:Category:Buildings and structures in Alaska
- Superfund sites in Alaska
- Supreme Court of the State of Alaska
- Symbols of the State of Alaska
  - Category:Symbols of Alaska
    - commons:Category:Symbols of Alaska

== T ==
- Telecommunications in Alaska
  - commons:Category:Communications in Alaska
- Telephone area codes in Alaska
- Television shows set in Alaska
- Television stations in Alaska
- Territory of Alaska, 1912–1959
- Theatres in Alaska
  - commons:Category:Theatres in Alaska
- Tourism in Alaska website
  - commons:Category:Tourism in Alaska
- Towns in Alaska
  - commons:Category:Cities in Alaska
- Transportation in Alaska
  - Category:Transportation in Alaska
    - commons:Category:Transport in Alaska

== U ==
- Ultra prominent peaks of Alaska
- United States of America
  - States of the United States of America
  - United States census statistical areas of Alaska
  - Alaska's congressional delegations
  - United States congressional district of Alaska
  - United States Court of Appeals for the Ninth Circuit
  - United States District Court for the District of Alaska
  - United States representatives from Alaska
  - United States senators from Alaska
- Universities and colleges in Alaska
  - commons:Category:Universities and colleges in Alaska
- US-AK – ISO 3166-2:US region code for the State of Alaska

== V ==
- Vaccinate Alaska Coalition
- VacTrAK

== W ==
- Waterfalls of Alaska
  - Category:Waterfalls of Alaska
    - commons:Category:Waterfalls of Alaska
  Wikimedia
  - Wikimedia Commons:Category:Alaska
    - commons:Category:Maps of Alaska
  - Wikinews:Category:Alaska
    - Wikinews:Portal:Alaska
  - Wikipedia Category:Alaska
    - Wikipedia Portal:Alaska
    - Wikipedia:WikiProject Alaska
      - Category:WikiProject Alaska articles
      - Wikipedia:WikiProject Alaska/Participants
- Wildlife of Alaska
- Wind power in Alaska

== Y ==
York, Alaska Yakutat Airport Yakutat, Alaska

== Z ==
- Zoos in Alaska
  - commons:Category:Zoos in Alaska

== See also ==
- Topic overview:
  - Alaska
  - Outline of Alaska
