= Outline of Alaska =

Alaska

The flag of Alaska

The seal of Alaska

The location of the state of Alaska in relation to the rest of the United States of America

The following outline is provided as an overview of and topical guide to the U.S. state of Alaska:

Alaska (/ə.ˈlæs.kə/ , ə-LASS-kə) is a U.S. state located in the northwestern regions of North America. Part of the Western United States region, it is one of the two non-contiguous U.S. states, alongside Hawaii. Alaska is considered to be the northernmost, westernmost, and longitudinally, the easternmost state in the United States. It is a semi-exclave of the U.S, bordering the Canadian territory of Yukon and the province of British Columbia to the east. It shares a western maritime border in the Bering Strait with Russia's Chukotka Autonomous Okrug, and is closer to another continent (Asia) than any other U.S. state. The Chukchi and Beaufort Seas of the Arctic Ocean lie to the north, and the Pacific Ocean to the south.

== General reference ==
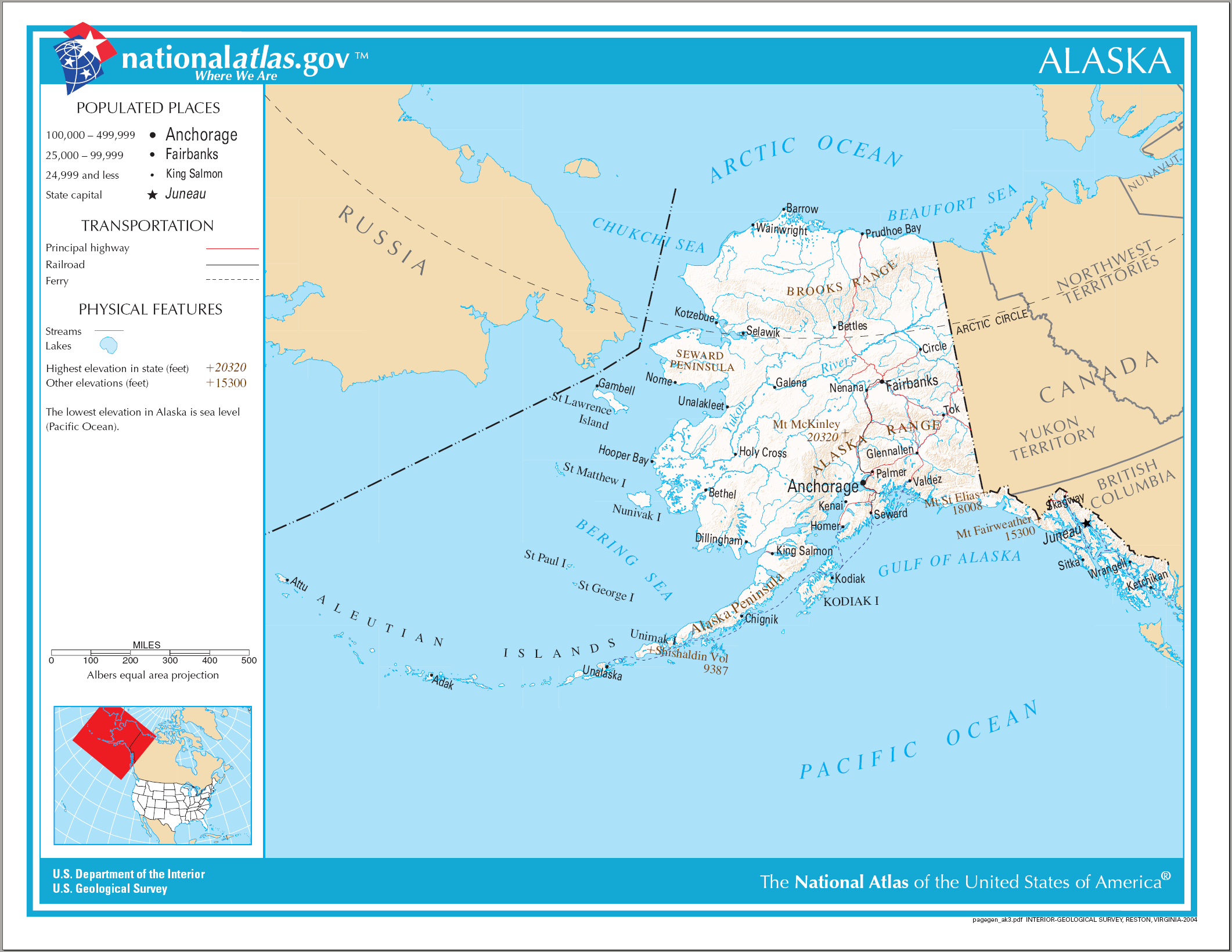
An enlargeable map of the state of Alaska

- Names
  - Common name: Alaska
    - Pronunciation: /əˈlæskə/
  - Official name: State of Alaska
  - Abbreviations and name codes
    - Postal symbol: AK
    - ISO 3166-2 code: US-AK
    - Internet second-level domain: .ak.us
  - Nicknames
    - Great Land (previously used on license plates)
    - Land of the Midnight Sun
    - The Last Frontier (presently used on license plates)
    - Seward's Folly (named after U.S. Secretary of State William H. Seward)
    - Seward's Ice Box, Icebergia, Polaria, Walrussia, and Johnson's Polar Bear Garden were satirical names coined by members of the U.S. Congress during debate over the Alaska Purchase
- Adjectivals
  - Alaska
  - Alaskan
- Demonym: Alaskan

== Geography of Alaska ==
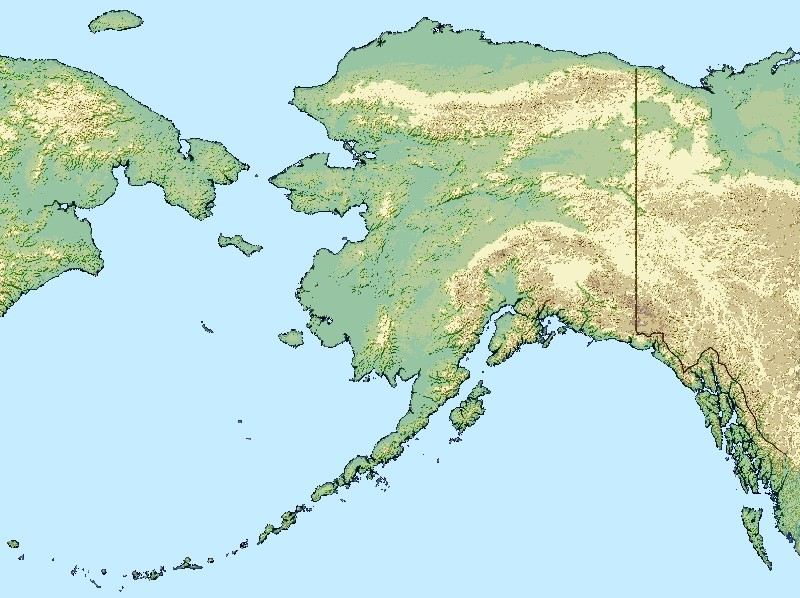
An enlargeable topographical map of the state of Alaska

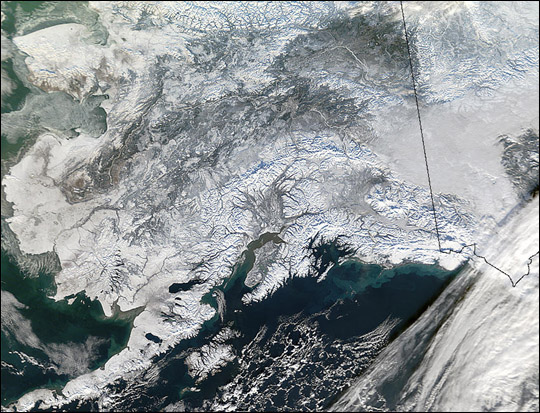
A satellite photo of Alaska during winter.

Geography of Alaska

- Alaska is: a U.S. state, a federal state of the United States of America
- Location: westernmost North America
  - Northern and Western Hemisphere
  - Americas
    - North America
      - Anglo America
      - Northern America
        - United States of America
  - Alaska Time Zone
- Population of Alaska: 710,231 (2010 U.S. Census)
- Area of Alaska: 665,384 sq mi (1,723,337 km^{2})
- Atlas of Alaska

=== Places in Alaska ===
Places in Alaska

- Historic places in Alaska
  - Ghost towns in Alaska
  - National Historic Landmarks in Alaska
  - National Register of Historic Places listings in Alaska
    - Bridges on the National Register of Historic Places in Alaska
- National Natural Landmarks in Alaska
- National parks in Alaska – see also List of areas in the United States National Park System.
  - Denali National Park and Preserve
  - Gates of the Arctic National Park and Preserve
  - Glacier Bay National Park and Preserve
  - Katmai National Park and Preserve
  - Kenai Fjords National Park
  - Kobuk Valley National Park
  - Lake Clark National Park and Preserve
  - Wrangell-St. Elias National Park and Preserve
- State parks in Alaska

=== Environment of Alaska ===
- Climate of Alaska
  - Climate change in Alaska
- Protected areas in Alaska
  - State forests of Alaska
- Superfund sites in Alaska
- Wildlife of Alaska
  - Fauna of Alaska
    - Birds of Alaska
    - Mammals of Alaska

==== Geographic features of Alaska ====
===== Man-made geographic features of Alaska =====
- List of reservoirs and dams of Alaska
- Trans-Alaska Pipeline System

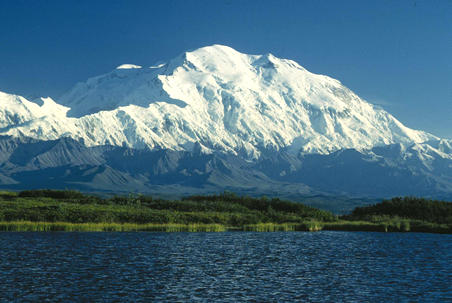
Denali in Alaska is the highest mountain peak of the United States of America and all of North America. Denali is the third most topographically prominent summit on Earth after Mount Everest and Aconcagua.

===== Natural geographic features of Alaska =====
- Islands of Alaska
- Lakes of Alaska
- Mountains of Alaska
  - Mountain peaks of Alaska
    - Highest mountain peaks of Alaska
  - Volcanic craters in Alaska
- Rivers of Alaska
  - Waterfalls in Alaska

=== Regions of Alaska ===
- Alaska Interior
- Alaska North Slope
- Alaska Panhandle
- Arctic Alaska
- Kenai Peninsula
- Matanuska-Susitna Valley
- Seward Peninsula
- Southcentral Alaska
- Southwest Alaska
  - Alaska Peninsula
- Tanana Valley
- The Bush
- Yukon-Kuskokwim Delta

==== Administrative divisions of Alaska ====
- Boroughs and census areas of the state of Alaska
  - Municipalities in Alaska
    - Cities in Alaska
      - State capital of Alaska: Juneau
      - Largest city in Alaska: Anchorage (66th largest city in the United States)
      - City nicknames in Alaska
    - Native tribal entities
    - Towns in Alaska

===== Boroughs of Alaska =====
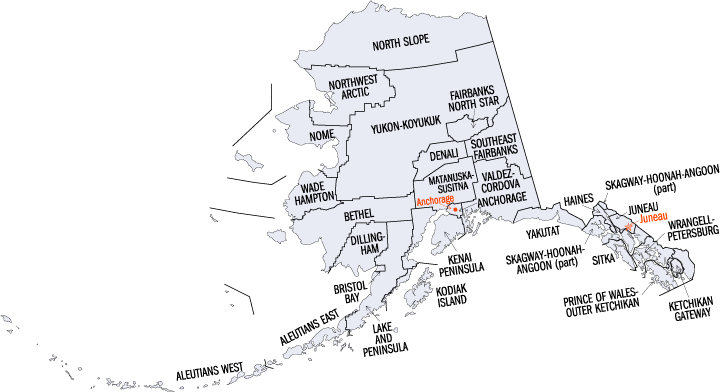
An enlargeable map of the boroughs and census areas of the state of Alaska

List of boroughs in Alaska

- Aleutians East Borough
- Anchorage
- Borough
- Bristol Bay Borough
- Fairbanks North Star Borough
- Haines Borough
- Juneau
- Kenai Peninsula Borough
- Ketchikan Gateway Borough
- Kodiak Island Borough
- Lake and Peninsula Borough
- Matanuska-Susitna Borough
- North Slope Borough
- Northwest Arctic Borough
- Sitka Borough
- Skagway Borough
- Unorganized Borough
- Wrangell
- Yakutat City and Borough

=== Demography of Alaska ===
Demographics of Alaska

- Alaska locations by per capita income

== Government and politics of Alaska ==
Politics of Alaska

- Form of government: U.S. state government
- Alaska's congressional delegations
- Alaska State Capitol
- Elections in Alaska
  - Electoral reform in Alaska
- Legal status of Alaska
- Political party strength in Alaska
- Political scandals
  - Alaska political corruption probe

=== Branches of the government of Alaska ===
Government of Alaska

==== Executive branch of the government of Alaska ====
- Governor of Alaska
  - Lieutenant Governor of Alaska
- State departments
  - Alaska Department of Commerce, Community and Economic Development
  - Alaska Department of Corrections
  - Alaska Department of Health and Social Services
  - Alaska Division of Juvenile Justice
  - Alaska Permanent Fund
  - Alaska Volcano Observatory
  - Alaska Department of Education & Early Development
  - Alaska Department of Fish and Game
  - Alaska Department of Natural Resources
  - Alaska Department of Transportation & Public Facilities
  - Alaska Oil and Gas Conservation Commission
  - Alaska State Medical Board
  - Alaska State Pension Investment Board

==== Legislative branch of the government of Alaska ====
- Alaska Legislature (bicameral)
  - Upper house: Alaska Senate
  - Lower house: Alaska House of Representatives
- Alaska Legislative Council
- List of Alaska State Legislatures

==== Judicial branch of the government of Alaska ====
Courts of Alaska

- Alaska Court System
- Supreme Court of Alaska
  - United States District Court for the District of Alaska
  - List of United States federal courthouses in Alaska

=== Law and order in Alaska ===
- Cannabis in Alaska
- Capital punishment in Alaska: none. Alaska abolished the death penalty prior to statehood, eight men were executed by the earlier territorial government (1900–1959) and even earlier "Miner's Courts" executed a number of men in the 19th century. See also Capital punishment in the United States; William Fentress Thompson and "Jerked to Jesus" (in regard to capital punishment and the early history of Fairbanks).
- Constitution of Alaska
- Crime in Alaska
- Gun laws in Alaska
- Law enforcement in Alaska
  - Law enforcement agencies in Alaska
    - Alaska State Troopers
  - Penal system in Alaska
    - Alaska Department of Corrections
    - Prisons in Alaska
- Same-sex marriage in Alaska

=== Military in Alaska ===
- Alaska National Guard
  - Alaska Air National Guard
  - Alaska Army National Guard
- Alaska State Defense Force

=== Local government in Alaska ===
- Assembly of the City and Borough of Juneau, Alaska

== History of Alaska ==
- History of Alaska

=== History of Alaska, by period ===
- Prehistory of Alaska
  - History of slavery in Alaska
- Russian Alaska, 1741 – 1867
  - Great Northern Expedition, 1733 – 1743
- Spanish expeditions to Alaska, 1744 – 1791
- U.S. Department of Alaska, 1867 – 1884
  - Alaska Purchase, treaty signed on March 30, 1867
  - Gold mining in Alaska
    - Klondike Gold Rush, 1896 – 1899
  - Alaska boundary dispute, 1896 – 1903
- District of Alaska, 1884 – 1912
  - Hay-Herbert Treaty, arbitration committee resolution occurred October 20, 1903
- Territory of Alaska, 1912 – 1959
  - World War I, June 28, 1914 – November 11, 1918
    - United States enters Great War on April 6, 1917
  - Mount McKinley National Park established on February 26, 1917
  - Serum run to Nome, January 26 - February 15, 1925
  - World War II, September 1, 1939 – September 2, 1945
    - Alaska World War II Army Airfields
    - Alaska Defense Command established February 4, 1941
    - United States enters Second World War on December 8, 1941
    - Aleutian Islands Campaign, June 3, 1942 – August 15, 1943
    - Alaska Highway completed 1942
    - Alaskan Air Command established December 18, 1945
  - Operation Washtub (United States), active 1951-1959
- State of Alaska becomes 49th state admitted to the United States of America on January 3, 1959
  - Arctic National Wildlife Refuge established on December 6, 1960
  - Good Friday earthquake of 1964
  - Prudhoe Bay oil field discovered 1968
  - Alaska Native Claims Settlement Act of 1971
  - Trans-Alaska Pipeline System completed 1977
  - Arctic National Wildlife Refuge drilling controversy since 1977
  - Mount McKinley National Park incorporated into Denali National Park and Preserve on December 2, 1980
  - Gates of the Arctic National Park and Preserve established on December 2, 1980
  - Glacier Bay National Park and Preserve established on December 2, 1980
  - Katmai National Park and Preserve established on December 2, 1980
  - Kenai Fjords National Park established on December 2, 1980
  - Kobuk Valley National Park established on December 2, 1980
  - Lake Clark National Park and Preserve established on December 2, 1980
  - Wrangell-Saint Elias National Park and Preserve established on December 2, 1980
  - Arctic National Wildlife Refuge expanded on December 2, 1980
  - Exxon Valdez oil spill of 1989

=== History of Alaska, by region ===
- History of Anchorage, Alaska
- History of Fairbanks, Alaska

=== History of Alaska, by subject ===
- History of aviation in Alaska
- List of Alaska State Legislatures
- History of slavery in Alaska

== Culture of Alaska ==
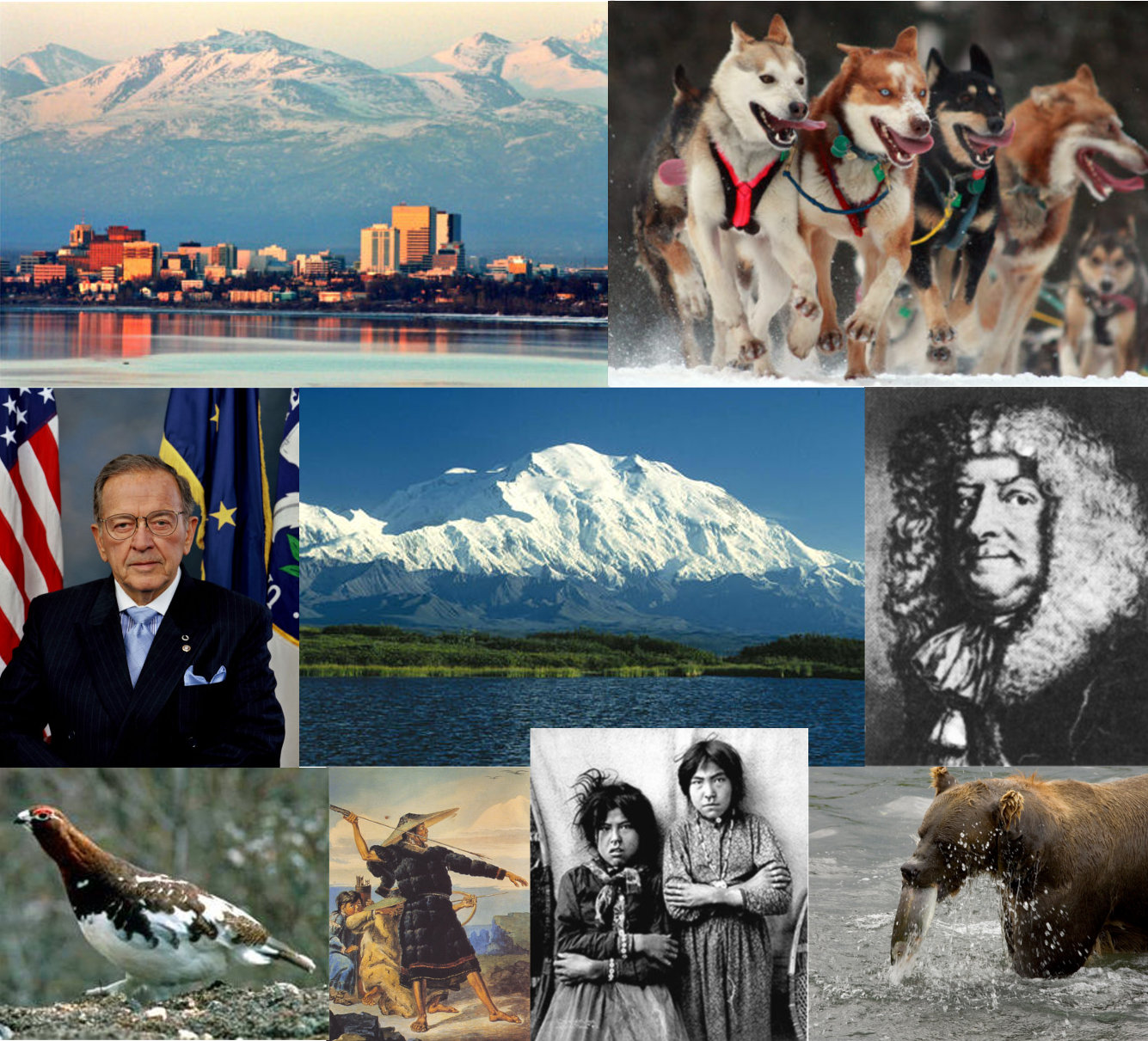
clockwise from top left, Anchorage, sled dogs, Vitus Bering, brown bear with salmon, two Tlingit girls, an Aleut man, willow ptarmigan, Senator Ted Stevens, Denali (center)

Culture of Alaska

- Casinos in Alaska
- Hunting and fishing in Alaska
- Gardening in Alaska
- Museums in Alaska
- People of Alaska
  - Natives of Alaska
- Religion in Alaska
  - Cemeteries in Alaska
  - Christianity in Alaska
    - The Church of Jesus Christ of Latter-day Saints in Alaska
    - Episcopal Diocese of Alaska
    - Orthodox parishes in Alaska
- Scouting in Alaska

=== The arts in Alaska ===
- Alaska Native art
- Cinema in Alaska
  - Alaska Film Archives
  - Films set in Alaska
- Music of Alaska

=== Sports in Alaska ===
Sports in Alaska

- Alaska Sports Hall of Fame

=== State symbols of Alaska ===
State symbols of Alaska

- State insignia
  - Flag of the State of Alaska
  - Seal of the State of Alaska
  - State motto: "North to the Future"
- State bird: Willow ptarmigan, adopted by the Territorial Legislature in 1955. It is a small (15–17 inches) Arctic grouse that lives among willows and on open tundra and muskeg. Plumage is brown in summer, changing to white in winter. The willow ptarmigan is common in much of Alaska.
- State fish: King salmon, adopted 1962.
- State flower: Wild/native forget-me-not, adopted by the Territorial Legislature in 1917. It is a perennial that is found throughout Alaska, from Hyder to the Arctic Coast, and west to the Aleutians.
- State fossil: Woolly mammoth, adopted 1986.
- State gem: Jade, adopted 1968.
- State insect: Four-spot skimmer dragonfly, adopted 1995.
- State land mammal: Moose, adopted 1998.
- State marine mammal: Bowhead whale, adopted 1983.
- State mineral: Gold, adopted 1968.
- State song: "Alaska's Flag"
- State sport: Dog mushing, adopted 1972.
- State tree: Sitka spruce, adopted 1962.
- State dog: Alaskan Malamute, adopted 2010.
- State soil: Tanana, adopted unknown.

== Economy and infrastructure of Alaska ==
Economy of Alaska

- Aquaculture in Alaska
- Commercial fishing in Alaska
  - Alaskan king crab fishing
- Communications in Alaska
  - Newspapers in Alaska
  - Radio stations in Alaska
  - Television stations in Alaska
- Energy in Alaska
  - Natural gas in Alaska
  - Power stations in Alaska
  - Solar power in Alaska
  - Trans-Alaska Pipeline System
  - Wind power in Alaska
- Companies of Alaska
- Gold mining in Alaska
- Health care in Alaska
  - Hospitals in Alaska

=== Transportation in Alaska ===
Transportation in Alaska

- Government agencies
  - Alaska Department of Transportation & Public Facilities
- Modes of transportation in Alaska
  - Air transport in Alaska
    - Airlines in Alaska
      - Alaska Airlines
      - Era Aviation
      - Frontier Flying Service
      - Pacific Alaska Airways
      - PenAir
    - Airports in Alaska – major airports include:
      - Ted Stevens Anchorage International Airport
      - Fairbanks International Airport
      - Juneau International Airport
      - Ketchikan International Airport
    - Bush flying in Alaska
  - Marine transport in Alaska
    - Alaska Marine Highway System
    - Inside Passage
    - Port of Anchorage
    - Valdez oil terminal
  - Bus travel in Alaska
    - Areas operating local bus service
      - Anchorage: People Mover
      - Bethel
      - Fairbanks: Metropolitan Area Commuter System
      - Juneau: Capital Transit System
      - Kenai
      - Ketchikan
      - Sitka – the Sitka Tribe of Alaska offers public bus transit in conjunction with the Alaska Department of Transportation.
  - Rail transport in Alaska
    - Railroads in Alaska
  - Roads in Alaska
    - Interstate Highways in Alaska
    - State highways in Alaska
  - Other modes of transportation in Alaska
    - Mushing – transportation by dogsled.
      - Dogsled
      - Sled dog
    - Off-road transportation
      - All-terrain vehicle
      - Snowmobile

== Education in Alaska ==
Education in Alaska

- Schools in Alaska
  - School districts in Alaska
    - Middle schools in Alaska
    - High schools in Alaska
  - Higher education in Alaska
    - College athletic programs in Alaska
    - Colleges and universities in Alaska
      - Alaska Pacific University, formerly Alaska Methodist University
      - Sheldon Jackson College
      - University of Alaska
        - University of Alaska Anchorage
        - University of Alaska Fairbanks
          - University of Alaska Museum of the North
          - University of Alaska Press
        - University of Alaska Southeast
    - Legal education in Alaska

== See also ==
- Topic overview:
  - Alaska
  - Index of Alaska-related articles
