= Vaccinate Alaska Coalition =

US health organization

The Vaccinate Alaska Coalition is a non-profit organization established to promote the immunization of Alaskan citizens and residents, and the reduction of vaccine-preventable diseases in Alaska. It is composed of health care individuals and organizations, and it directs a series of programs, coalitions, and activities designed to promote immunization.

== Background ==
While the coalition is an apolitical non-profit, it is sponsored by the Immunization Program of the Section of Epidemiology of the Division of Public Health of the Alaska Department of Health and Social Services, sharing office space and personnel with the program. Full voting membership is open to the public.

== Organization ==
Each individual member and each organization affiliated with the coalition has one vote, which can be exercised at quarterly general assembly meetings. The coalition is managed by a coordinator, with an executive board composed of a president, vice-president, treasurer, and secretary.

== Programs ==
The coalition focuses on publicizing and promoting immunizations. In addition to providing literature about immunizations to doctors and patients, the coalition provides a resource to physicians and nurses as well as health care organizations for information and concerns about vaccines. The coalition acts as a forum to encourage cooperation between the different members of the public health community in Alaska and helps coordinate efforts to expand immunization programs throughout the geographically challenging state.

The most prominent program of the VAC is the I Did It By 2 campaign which utilizes the popularity of the Iditarod dog sled race to promote immunization awareness. The campaign involves providing Iditarod-themed promotional supplies to health care providers and materials to parents of infants to help keep track of their child's required immunizations.

The coalition also highlights prominent members of the Alaskan health care community with the annual Excellence in Immunization Award, given to recognize individuals or organizations who have demonstrated commitment to improving the immunization status of Alaska.
