= Alaska lunar sample displays =

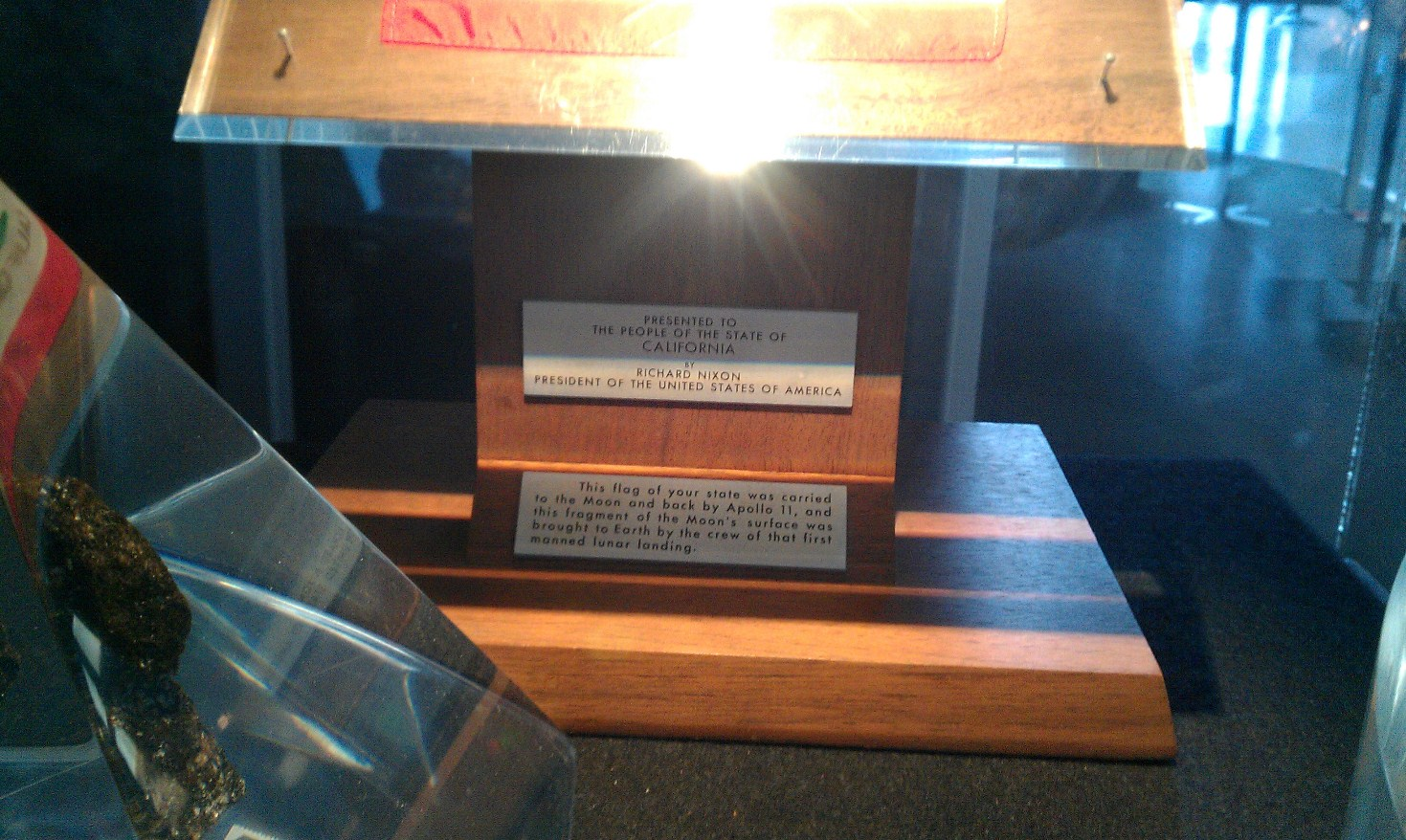
Plaques on the California Apollo 11 lunar sample display, similar to the display in Alaska

The Alaska lunar sample displays are two commemorative plaques consisting of small fragments of Moon specimen brought back with the Apollo 11 and Apollo 17 lunar missions and given in the 1970s to the people of the state of Alaska by United States President Richard Nixon as goodwill gifts.

== Description ==
=== Apollo 11 ===
At the request of Nixon, NASA had about 250 presentation plaques made following Apollo 11 in 1969. Each included about four rice-sized particles of Moon dust from the mission totaling about 50 mg. The Apollo 11 lunar sample display has an acrylic plastic button containing the Moon dust mounted with the recipient's country or state flag that had been to the Moon and back. All 135 countries received the display, as did the 50 states of the United States and the U.S. provinces and the United Nations.

The plaques were given as gifts by Nixon in 1970.

=== Apollo 17 ===
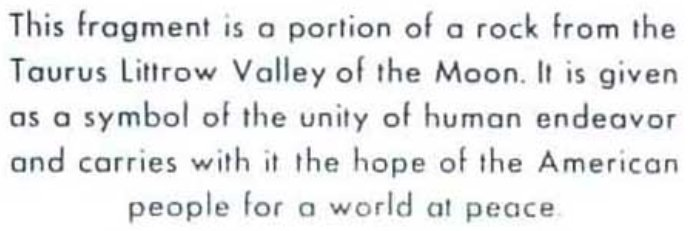
Message on Apollo 17 plaque

The sample Moon rock collected during the Apollo 17 mission was later named lunar basalt 70017, and dubbed the Goodwill rock. Pieces of the rock weighing about 1.14 grams were placed inside a piece of acrylic lucite, and mounted, along with a flag of the country which would receive it, that had flown on Apollo 17.

In 1973 Nixon had the plaques sent to 135 countries, and to the United States with its territories, as a goodwill gesture.

== History ==
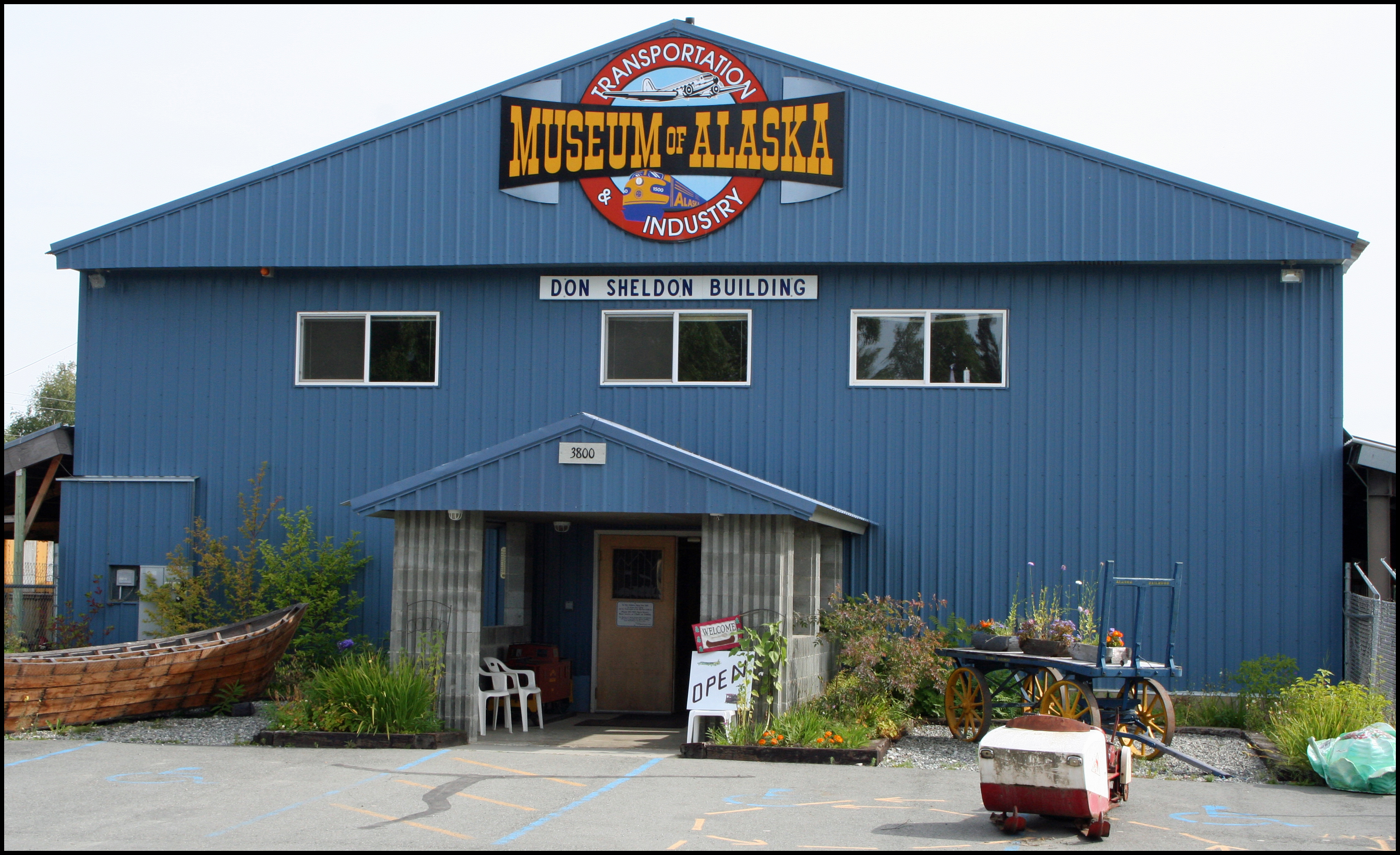
Alaska Transportation and Industry Museum

The Alaska Apollo 11 lunar commemorative wooden plaque display was on public viewing at the Alaska Transportation Museum in Anchorage in 1973. In September of that year, the museum burned down under suspicious circumstances and the Apollo 11 Alaska lunar plaque display was reported missing. It is suspected that an arsonist started the museum fire on September 6, 1973.

Arthur C. Anderson, an individual Plaintiff v. The State of Alaska an Alaskan State Museums, and agency of the State, Defendants also known as Anderson v. Alaskan State Museums is an Alaska State civil case filed on December 20, 2010 by attorney Daniel P. Harris in the Superior Court of Alaska Third Judicial District at Anchorage. The subject in this case is the Apollo 11 Moon Rock and plaque that was presented in 1969 by Richard M. Nixon, President of the United States, to Keith Harvey Miller, Governor of Alaska.

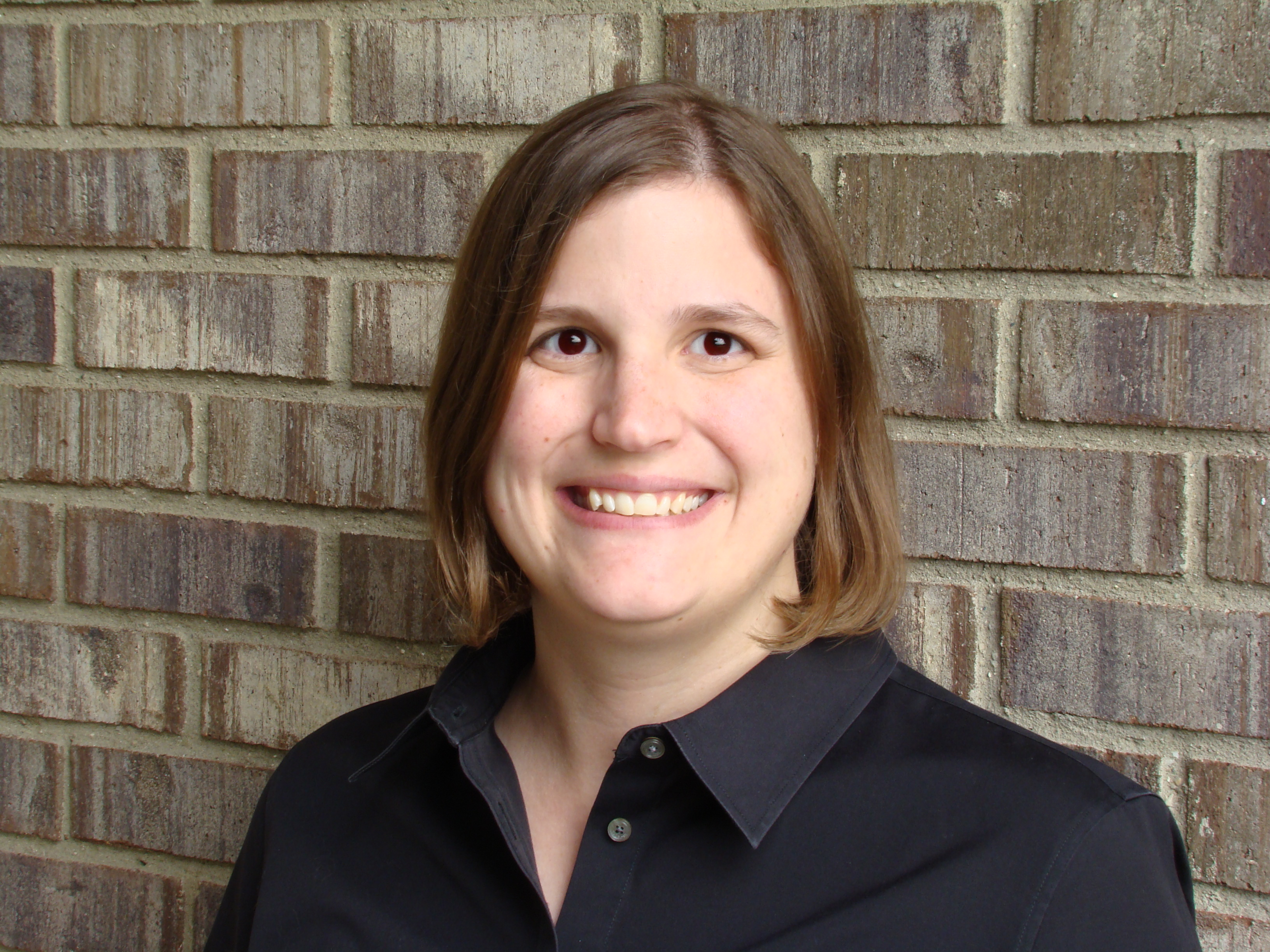
Elizabeth Riker

After a 2010 story written by Elizabeth Riker for the Capital City Weekly, Arthur Coleman Anderson learned the origins of a Moon rock he says he found as a 17-year-old after a fire at the Transportation Museum in Anchorage. Anderson subsequently filed a lawsuit against Alaska and the Alaskan State Museums to determine title of the object.

The missing Moon rocks were returned as of December 7, 2012, and both the Apollo 11 and Apollo 17 displays are at the Alaska State Museum in Juneau.

== See also ==
- List of Apollo lunar sample displays
