= Alaska Immigration Justice Project =

American non-profit agency

- Formation: July 1, 2005
- Type: Legal Non-Profit Organization
- Headquarters: Anchorage, Alaska
- Location: United States
- Executive Director: Robin Bronen
- Key people: Bill Saupe (President)
- Website: www.akijp.org

The Alaska Immigration Justice Project (AIJP) is a non-profit agency that provides low-cost immigration legal assistance to immigrants and refugees in all immigration applications including citizenship, permanent resident status, work permits, asylum, family-based petitions and immigration petitions for immigrant victims of domestic violence, sexual assault and human trafficking.

== History ==
The Alaska Immigration Justice Project (AIJP) is the only agency in Alaska dedicated to protecting the human rights of immigrants and refugees. Founded in 2005, AIJP staff provides statewide comprehensive immigration legal services. Collectively, AIJP Board and staff have more than 25 years of legal experience serving Alaska's immigrants and refugees. AIJP staff provides services statewide, traveling to many communities throughout Alaska including, Unalaska, Sitka, Ketchikan, Kodiak, Juneau, Fairbanks, Kenai and Homer. AIJP's legal service priorities include representing immigrant crime victims and people fleeing persecution and torture in their home countries.

In addition to providing legal services, AIJP staff members serve as a resource for state and federal public agencies on issues involving immigrants and refugees. AIJP provides services to roles such as health care providers, social service providers, state officials, criminal defense attorneys, prosecutors and judges.

In 2007, AIJP opened the first statewide Language Interpreter Center (LIC). The LIC partners the public and private sector to offer statewide training for interpreters as well as provide referral services for all businesses and agencies in need of interpreter services. The LIC works with foreign language interpreters as well as Alaska Native interpreters.

== Mission ==
AIJP's mission is to promote and protect the human rights of immigrants and refugees throughout Alaska by providing critical services to this underserved population, including immigration legal services, language interpretative services, training and educational programs.

The organization is affiliated with Pro Bono Net, a US nonprofit organization based in New York City and San Francisco. The organization works in close partnership with nonprofit legal aid organizations across the United States and Canada, to increase access to justice for the millions of poor people who face legal problems every year without help from a lawyer. It does this by (i) supporting the innovative and effective use of technology by the nonprofit legal sector, (ii) increasing participation by volunteers, and (iii) facilitating collaborations among nonprofit legal organizations and advocates working on similar issues or in the same region. Founded in 1998 with a grant from the Open Society Institute, Pro Bono Net has developed a broad base of support from foundations, law firms, corporate sponsors and nonprofit partners alike, to build web platforms that offer powerful and sophisticated online tools to pro bono and legal aid advocates, and to provide critical legal information and assistance directly to the public. Its model has been adopted in 30 states and regions, reaching approximately two-thirds of the poverty population and lawyers in the United States.

The organization is also affiliated with CitizenshipWorks, which provides easy-to-use online tools to help low and moderate-income individuals to answer important questions about their eligibility for naturalization, to better understand the naturalization process, and to prepare for the naturalization tests. CitizenshipWorks also provides online tools and resources for nonprofits that provide free or low cost naturalization application services.

== Projects ==
Pro bono Asylum Project

Founded in 1998, the Pro Bono Asylum Project trains and mentors attorneys to represent immigrants fleeing persecution and torture in their country of origin. AIJP staff work closely with pro bono attorneys to answer questions, review pleadings and provide relevant legal resource materials. Pro Bono attorneys have represented asylum seekers from all over the world, including Mexico, El Salvador, Cameroon, Gambia, Ethiopia, Russia and Burma.

Alaska Immigrant Rights Coalition

The Alaska Immigrant Rights Coalition is a collaboration of community members to ensure that the rights of immigrants and refugees are protected. Meetings occur regularly throughout the year to educate the immigrant and refugee community on changes to state and federal laws, including immigration law.

== Awards ==
The Anchorage Division of the FBI honored the Alaska Immigration Justice Project with its 2012 Director's Community Leadership Award. The FBI has worked closely with AIJP in making petitions for victims of violent crime, including human trafficking victims.
