= Agriculture in Alaska =

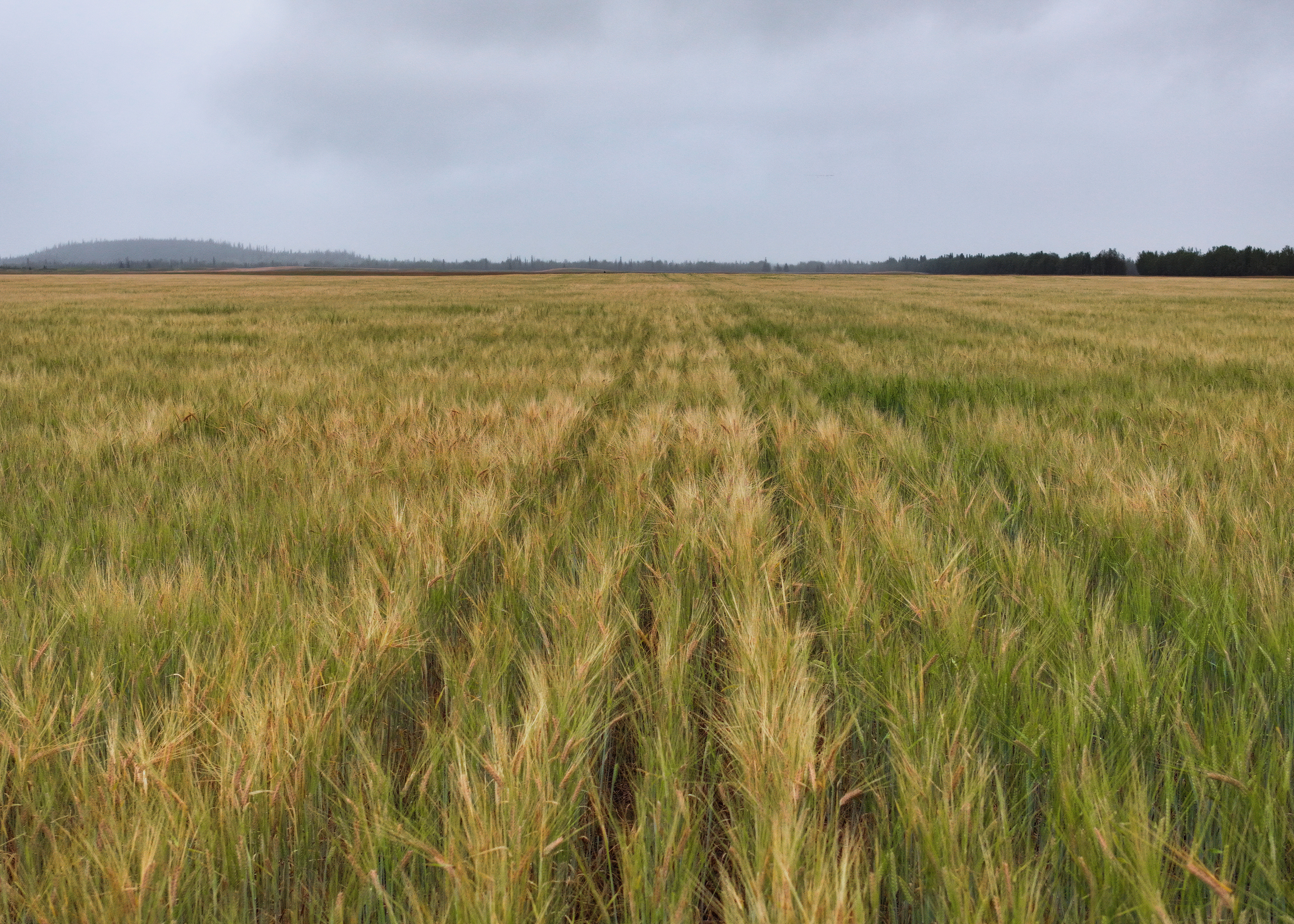
A field of barley near Delta Junction, a major center of the state's grain production

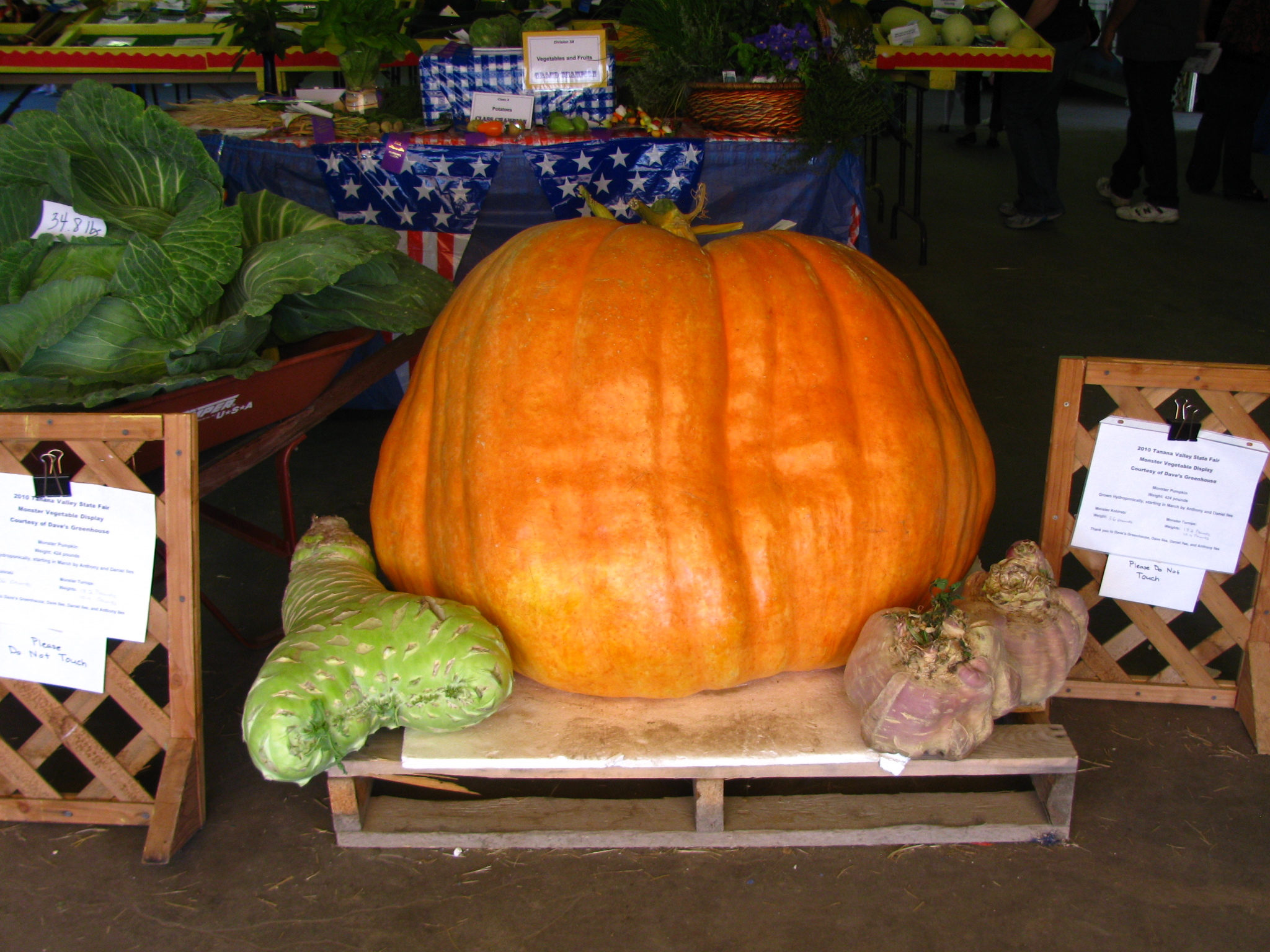
An Alaskan-grown gigantic pumpkin, along with cabbage, kohlrabi and turnips, at the Tanana Valley State Fair in 2010

Agriculture in Alaska faces many challenges, largely due to the climate, the short growing season, and generally poor soils. However, the exceptionally long days of summer enable some vegetables to attain world record sizes.

== Farms ==
The state of Alaska contains some 500 farms, covering about 830,000 acres in 2015, mainly to the northeast of the state's largest city, Anchorage, in the Matanuska Valley. The farms produce greenhouse and nursery crops, as well as hay (20,000 tons), dairy produce, potatoes (140,000 cwt), and livestock including cattle (11,000 inc. calves in 2016), reindeer, bison, and yak. Cereals in the state include barley (146,000 bushels) and oats (47,000 bushels). Other livestock include chickens, hogs, and sheep. By value, the top livestock commodities in 2015 were milk ($770,000), eggs, and beef in that order.

The exceptionally long summer days enable some vegetables to attain world record sizes, including a carrot of 19 pounds (8.6 kg), a rutabaga of 76 pounds (34 kg), and a cabbage of 127 pounds (58 kg).

== Alaskan soils ==
Alaska's commonest soil is tundra, which is rich in peat moss. It remains frozen as permafrost at depth, while the surface thaws in summer to a waterlogged state. In better-drained sandy areas, acidic podzols predominate. Crops are produced mainly on subarctic brown forest soils; these are rich in potassium but low in nitrogen and in organic matter.

The official state soil is the Tanana series, which is shallow, well drained, moderately permeable, and derived from limestone weathering. It is a coarse loam, cryoturbated to a depth of up to 72 inches (1.8 m).

== See also ==
- Climate of Alaska
