= VacTrAK =

VacTrAK (formally the 'Vaccination Tracking System of Alaska') is the statewide immunization registry for the State of Alaska. The web-based registry contains immunization records for all children in Alaska and it allows medical professionals throughout the state to access those records. The base software was built by Scientific Technologies Corporation (STC), and is currently used under different names by over a dozen public health departments in the United States and Canada. While preliminary testing is currently underway, statewide implementation of the program is set for the fall 2008.

== Etymology ==
The name VacTrAK is a syllabic abbreviation of the Vaccination Tracking System of Alaska where AK stands for Alaska. The nickname is intended to liven-up the rather drab name Alaska Immunization Information System which STC had given the product.

== Usage ==
VacTrAK contains both a graphical user interface and a database which is accessible through encrypted connection via the internet. Vaccination records are stored and maintained at a central database, and physicians, nurses, and other medical personnel can view, edit, and update the records from any computer with an internet connection. As the State of Alaska issues immunization requirements for all children attending school or a licensed child care program, educational and day care administrators are able to access the records with read-only privileges in order to certify eligibility for enrollment.

The primary function of the program is to enable physicians to quickly identify and administer the appropriate immunizations according to the schedules set for by the Advisory Committee on Immunization Practices. To that end, the program will issue reminders to both the family of the child and the practicing physician to alert of upcoming vaccination appointments. Because the system is integrated statewide, it reduces the chances of over-immunization and reduces missed opportunities when children attend different physicians within a vaccination series. This promises to have a profound impact in Alaska given the state's enormous geographic diversity and rather mobile population. In each record, VacTrAK also stores contraindications, allergies, and other information which a physician will take into account when administering a vaccine.

The program also keeps records and creates logs of vaccine usage, tracing any given vaccine from its arrival in Alaska to its actual administration. This is designed to prevent vaccine wastage and streamline the distribution network.

The Epidemiology Section of the Division of Public Health of the Department of Health and Social Services of the State of Alaska will also have access to the registry in its entirety. This will allow epidemiologists and public nurses to analyze the data in order to better target vaccination efforts and reduce the incidents of infectious disease outbreaks.

== Management ==
The Immunization Program of the Division of Public Health of the Department of Health and Social Services of the State of Alaska is responsible for implementing and maintaining VacTrAK. Funding for the registry was specifically outlined in the program's 2006 federal grant as per a Centers for Disease Control requirement that all states implement centralized immunization registries in order to qualify for the federally funded Vaccines for Children program which provides approved vaccines to clinics free of charge.

== Changes to VacTrAK ==
While records for all children of Alaska are automatically permitted inclusion in the registry (unless the parents or guardians specifically opt-out), enrollment in VacTrAK is currently voluntary on behalf of the health care providers. By 2010, all providers were required to enroll in and provide accurate information to VacTrAK as a prerequisite to receiving vaccines free of charge through the Vaccines for Children program.
