= Electoral reform in Alaska =

U.S. state electoral reform

Electoral reform in Alaska refers to efforts to change the voting laws in this U.S. state. U.S. Senator John McCain and other Republicans endorsed a referendum to implement Instant Runoff Voting, after the conservative vote split between the Republican candidate and the Alaskan Independence Party candidate, allowing a Democrat to win the governorship in 1994. However, the League of Women Voters opposed it, citing the principle of one man, one vote, and the measure was defeated.

Another issue is whether Alaska will join the National Popular Vote Interstate Compact and designate its three electors to the candidate winning the nationwide popular vote, rather than the winner of the state's vote. SB 138, a bill to do just that, was introduced in 2007, but was not approved.

In 2020, the approval of Ballot Measure 2 by referendum resulted in major changes to Alaska's election system. Primary elections has been since then a unified nonpartisan blanket primary with the top four vote-getters advancing to the general election, regardless of party. The general election is then decided by instant-runoff voting.
