= Alaska statistical areas =

Coordinates: 64.0685°N 152.2782°W

The U.S. State of Alaska currently has four statistical areas that have been delineated by the Office of Management and Budget (OMB). On July 21, 2023, the OMB delineated two metropolitan statistical areas and two micropolitan statistical areas in Alaska. The most populous of these statistical areas is the Anchorage, AK Metropolitan Statistical Area, centered on the state's largest city of Anchorage.

== Statistical areas ==
The Office of Management and Budget (OMB) has designated more than 1,000 statistical areas for the United States and Puerto Rico. These statistical areas are important geographic delineations of population clusters used by the OMB, the United States Census Bureau, planning organizations, and federal, state, and local government entities.

The OMB defines a core-based statistical area (commonly referred to as a CBSA) as the county or counties (or county-equivalents) surrounding at least one densely-settled core of at least 10,000 population, "plus adjacent counties having a high degree of social and economic integration with the core as measured through commuting ties with the counties containing the core". The OMB further divides core-based statistical areas based on population into metropolitan statistical areas (MSAs) for those with at least 50,000 and micropolitan statistical areas (μSAs) for those with 10,000 to 49,999 people.

The OMB defines a combined statistical area (CSA) as two or more adjacent core-based statistical areas where the employment interchange rate (% commuting from A to B plus % commuting from B to A) is at least 15%. The primary statistical areas (PSAs) include all combined statistical areas and any core-based statistical area that is not a constituent of a combined statistical area.

The four United States statistical areas, 19 organized boroughs and 11 census areas of the State of Alaska
Core-based statistical area	2025 population (est.)	County-equivalent	2025 population (est.)
Anchorage, AK MSA	405,821	Municipality of Anchorage, Alaska	287,155
Anchorage, AK MSA	405,821	Matanuska-Susitna Borough, Alaska	118,666
Fairbanks–College, AK MSA	93,972	Fairbanks North Star Borough, Alaska	93,972
Juneau, AK μSA	31,609	City and Borough of Juneau, Alaska	31,609
Ketchikan, AK μSA	13,549	Ketchikan Gateway Borough, Alaska	13,549
none		Kenai Peninsula Borough, Alaska	61,951
none		Bethel Census Area, Alaska	18,391
none		Kodiak Island Borough, Alaska	12,387
none		North Slope Borough, Alaska	10,582
none		Nome Census Area, Alaska	9,830
none		City and Borough of Sitka, Alaska	8,319
none		Kusilvak Census Area, Alaska	7,932
none		Southeast Fairbanks Census Area, Alaska	7,270
none		Northwest Arctic Borough, Alaska	7,095
none		Chugach Census Area, Alaska	6,553
none		Prince of Wales-Hyder Census Area, Alaska	5,777
none		Aleutians West Census Area, Alaska	5,240
none		Yukon-Koyukuk Census Area, Alaska	5,028
none		Dillingham Census Area, Alaska	4,483
none		Aleutians East Borough, Alaska	3,479
none		Petersburg Borough, Alaska	3,394
none		Copper River Census Area, Alaska	2,666
none		Hoonah-Angoon Census Area, Alaska	2,271
none		Haines Borough, Alaska	2,068
none		Wrangell City and Borough, Alaska	2,007
none		Denali Borough, Alaska	1,616
none		Lake and Peninsula Borough, Alaska	1,357
none		Municipality of Skagway, Alaska	1,104
none		Bristol Bay Borough, Alaska	847
none		Yakutat City and Borough, Alaska	672
State of Alaska			737.270

The four core-based statistical areas of the State of Alaska
2025 rank	Core-based statistical area	Population				
2025 rank	Core-based statistical area	2025 estimate	Change	2020 Census	Change	2010 Census
1	Anchorage, AK MSA	405,821	+1.88%	398,328	+4.60%	380,821
2	Fairbanks–College, AK MSA	93,972	−1.76%	95,655	−1.97%	97,581
3	Juneau, AK μSA	31,609	−2.00%	32,255	+3.13%	31,275
4	Ketchikan, AK μSA	13,549	−2.86%	13,948	+3.49%	13,477

== See also ==
- Geography of Alaska
  - Demographics of Alaska
