= List of colleges and universities in Alaska =

This is a list of colleges and universities in Alaska. This list also includes other educational institutions providing higher education, meaning tertiary, quaternary, and, in some cases, post-secondary education.

== Institutions ==
=== Four-year institutions ===
| School | Location | Control | Carnegie Classification | Enrollment (Fall 2024) | Founded |
|---|---|---|---|---|---|
| University of Alaska Anchorage | Anchorage | Public | Master's university | 10,493 | 1957 |
| University of Alaska Fairbanks | Fairbanks | Public | Doctoral university | 6,893 | 1917 |
| University of Alaska Southeast | Juneau | Public | Master's university | 2,000 | 1972 |
| Alaska Bible College | Palmer | Private (Not-for-profit) | Faith-related institution | 38 | 1966 |
| Alaska Pacific University | Anchorage | Private (Not-for-profit) | Baccalaureate college | 593 | 1957 |
| Saint Herman Theological Seminary | Kodiak | Private (Not-for-profit) | Faith-related institution | | 1972 |

=== Two-year institutions ===
==== Public ====
- Iḷisaġvik College, tribal community college in Utqiaġvik
- Kenai Peninsula College, community college with campuses in Soldotna, Homer, Seward
- Kodiak College, community college in Kodiak
- Matanuska–Susitna College, community college in Palmer
- Prince William Sound College, community college in Valdez

==== Private ====
- Alaska Career College, for-profit vocational school in Anchorage
- Charter College, for-profit associate-level college in Anchorage
- Outer Coast College, forthcoming, in Sitka

=== Defunct institutions ===
- Wayland Baptist University in Anchorage (1985-2025)

== See also ==
- List of college athletic programs in Alaska
- Higher education in the United States
- List of American institutions of higher education
- List of recognized higher education accreditation organizations
- List of colleges and universities
- List of colleges and universities by country
