= Capital City Weekly =

- Type: Weekly newspaper
- Format: Tabloid
- Owner: Sound Publishing
- Publisher: Rustan Burton
- Editor: Sarah Day
- Language: English
- Headquarters: 3100 Channel Drive; Juneau, AK 99801; United States
- Website: capitalcityweekly.com

The Capital City Weekly, or CCW as it is informally known, is a free regional weekly newspaper in Juneau — Alaska's capital. It is the largest distributed community paper in Southeast Alaska. It focuses on feature news stories about Southeast Alaska with nearly all of its content produced by local writers.
