= History of slavery in Alaska =

The history of slavery in Alaska differs from that of the other states that comprise the United States since Alaska became part of the United States after slavery was abolished in 1865. Nonetheless, slavery was practiced in Alaska by some groups of Alaska Natives, by the Russian colonists and fur traders. After Alaska became part of the United States, there are accounts of the de facto enslavement of Alaska Natives by european colonists and the United States Government.

The Haida, Tlingit, and Tsimshian tribes practiced chattel slavery. This lasted until at least 1886 when an enslaved man, Sah Quah, appeared in a court in Sitka requesting papers for his freedom from his enslaver, Nah-Ki-Klan, a Tlingit man in Sitka.

"The life of the slave is entirely at the disposal of his master or his mistress, and it has been customary among them to kill one or more slaves on the death of a master, or on the happening of some other event, such as the completion of new house. Boring the ears, or putting out an eye, of a slave, or some other mode of marking the flesh, has been and is now a custom with some of the families of these people. The evidence shows that the object of such mutilation is to impress upon the slaves their inferiority, and render their humiliation complete; that they are believers in witchcraft, and that, when a spirit of insubordination becomes manifest on the part of the slaves, the juggler is called upon, and that he, by exorcisms and magical incantations, pretends to drive out the rebellious spirits, and the slaves are compelled to submit."

Russian colonists in Alaska came from a society with traditions of slavery (as in Siberia) as well as of serfdom. The Russian-American Company, which effectively controlled Russian interests in the northern Pacific coasts of North America, had the right to employ serfs.

In 1802, Russian settlers documented that sea captains from Boston were bartering enslaved Africans for otter furs with the Tlingit people in Southeast Alaska.

In Russian Alaska, the promyshlenniki forced Aleut and Alutiiq men to hunt sea otters as part of the maritime fur trade, taking their women and children hostage. Formally, the Russian Empire abolished serfdom with the Emancipation reform of 1861.

The Thirteenth Amendment to the United States Constitution which took effect on December 18, 1865, abolished slavery within the United States of America. When the United States purchased Alaska in 1867, slavery also became illegal in Alaska.

In 1903 there were still documented cases of slavery in the District of Alaska. Wealthy families could purchase Aleutian girls to do housework, and often prohibited them from participating in child play or from becoming educated. These girls tended to come from the Atta Islands.

From 1911 until the passage of the Fur Seal Act in 1966, the inhabitants of the Pribilof Islands were governed directly by employees of the United States federal government, under conditions which the Tundra Times described in 1964 as slavery "in milder form perhaps than existed in the Deep South, but slavery nonetheless"; these conditions included being paid for their labor in food rather than in money (until 1950), being forcibly resettled, being denied suffrage, being denied freedom of assembly, and being denied freedom of movement.

In 1924 the passage of the Indian Citizenship Act granted Native Americans full rights of citizenship.

== See also ==
- Slavery among the Indigenous peoples of the Americas
