= List of Alaska state symbols =

Location of the state of Alaska in the United States of America

The U.S. state of Alaska has numerous symbols found in the Alaska Statutes.

== Insignia ==
Type	Symbol	Year	Image
Flag of Alaska	The North Star and the Big Dipper on a field of blue	1927	Alaska flag
Seal	The Seal of the state of Alaska	1959	Seal of Alaska
Motto	"North to the future"	1967	

== Nature ==
Type	Symbol	Year	Image
Flower	Forget-me-not	1917	Forget-me-not
Tree	Sitka spruce	1962	Sitka Spruce

== Animals ==
Type	Symbol	Year	Image
Bird	Willow ptarmigan	1955	Willow Ptarmigan
Dog	Alaskan Malamute	2010	Alaskan Malamute
Fish	King salmon	1962	King salmon
Insect	Four-spot skimmer dragonfly	1995	Libellulidae
Land mammal	Moose	1998	Moose
Marine mammal	Bowhead whale	1983	Bowhead whale

== Geology ==
Type	Symbol	Year	Image
Fossil	Woolly Mammoth	1986	Woolly Mammoth
Gem	Jade	1968	Jade
Mineral	Gold	1968	Gold

== Miscellaneous ==
Type	Symbol	Year	Image
Song	"Alaska's Flag"	1959	
Sport	Dog sledding	1972	Dog Mushing
Bolt-action rifle	Pre-1964 Winchester Model 70	2014	Pre-1964 Winchester Model 70

== Related ==
Not defined by Alaska statutes:

Type	Symbol	Year	Image
Quarters	Alaska State Quarter	2008	Alaska State Quarter

== See also ==
- List of Alaska-related topics
- Lists of United States state insignia
- State of Alaska
