= List of athletes from Alaska =

This list indexes notable athletes from Alaska.

- John Baker (b. 1960 or 1961 in Kotzebue), a perennial top 10 finisher at the Iditarod Trail Sled Dog Race.
- Damen Bell-Holter (b. 1990 in Hydaburg) is an American professional basketball player who currently plays for Lapuan Korikobrat of the Korisliiga. An Alaska Native and member of the state's Haida peoples, he played college basketball at Oral Roberts University. On September 30, 2013, he signed with the Boston Celtics.
- Chad Bentz (b. 1980 in Seward) is a Major League Baseball pitcher in the Cincinnati Reds organization. Bentz grew up in Juneau, and made history in 2004 by becoming the second pitcher, after Jim Abbott, to play the sport after being born without one of his hands. Bentz fields and catches with his glove the same way Abbott did when he played in the 1980s and early 1990s.
- Carlos Boozer (b. 1981), a retired power forward who played for the NBA's Los Angeles Lakers. An All-American while playing high school basketball in Juneau, he rose to national fame during his collegiate career at Duke University. He helped lead the team to an NCAA Men's National Championship in 2001. He left Duke prior to his senior year and was selected in the second round (35th overall) of the 2002 NBA draft by the Cleveland Cavaliers. In the midst of a major controversy with the team surrounding his free agency, he signed with the Utah Jazz in 2004.
- Matt Carle (b. 1984 in Anchorage), a former defenceman for the NHL's Tampa Bay Lightning, Philadelphia Flyers, San Jose Sharks, and Nashville Predators.
- Shawn Chacón (b. 1977 in Anchorage), a right-handed Major League Baseball starting pitcher for the Pittsburgh Pirates.
- Mario Chalmers (b. 1986 in Anchorage) is a former guard for the University of Kansas men's basketball team and was the starting point guard for the NBA team the Miami Heat including their championship teams.
- Callan Chythlook-Sifsof (b. 1989 in Anchorage) is a former Olympic snowboarder from Bristol Bay who earned a spot on the U.S. C team in 2006, and moved to the A team in '07. She competed in Vancouver in 2010.
- Corey Cogdell-Unrein (b. 1986 in Palmer) is a trapshooter and three-time U.S. Summer Olympian (2008, '12, and '16). She won the bronze medal in the women's trap event in the 2008 and 2016 Olympic Games.
- Darryn Colledge (b. 1982 in Fairbanks), played NFL professional football for the Arizona Cardinals, Miami Dolphins, and Green Bay Packers; retired in 2015.
- Ty Conklin (b. 1976 in Anchorage), a backup goaltender for the Pittsburgh Penguins. He established several school records during his career with the NCAA's University of New Hampshire. In his final year there in 2001, Conklin was named First Team All-American and was a finalist for the Hobey Baker Award, which goes to the NCAA's top men's ice hockey player.
- Brandon Dubinsky (b. 1986 in Anchorage), a former center for the NHL Columbus Blue Jackets. NY Rangers' 2nd round choice, 60th overall, in 2004 NHL Draft.
- Rosey Fletcher (b. 1975 in Anchorage), snowboarder and U.S. Winter Olympian (1998, '02, and '06). She won the bronze medal for the U.S. in the women's parallel giant slalom event in 2006.
- Scott Gomez (b. 1979 in Anchorage), a former center in the NHL. Drafted 27th overall in the 1998 NHL entry draft, he was the first Latino player in the NHL, and won the Calder Memorial Trophy as the league's Rookie of the Year in 2000. Gomez helped the Devils win the Stanley Cup in 2000 and 2003. During the 2004–05 NHL lockout he played for the ECHL's Alaska Aces minor league team. He was a member of the U.S. men's hockey team at the 2006 Winter Olympics.
- Ruthy Hebard (b. 1998), WNBA power forward with the Chicago Sky. Born in Chicago, but adopted by a Fairbanks family within days of her birth and raised in Fairbanks.
- Sam Hoger (b. 1980 in Eagle River), a mixed martial arts fighter. He is most notable for his appearance on the first season of The Ultimate Fighter, a reality television series produced by the Ultimate Fighting Championship and broadcast on Spike TV.
- Lydia Jacoby (b. 2004 in Anchorage), swimmer and U.S. Summer Olympian. She was the first Alaskan to qualify to compete in swimming at an Olympic Games, winning the gold medal in the 100 meter breaststroke at the 2020 Summer Olympics.
- Trajan Langdon (b. 1976 in Anchorage), current general manager of the NBA's New Orleans Pelicans. A three-time Alaska Player of the Year during his years with East Anchorage High School, Langdon gained fame in the U.S. while playing collegiately at Duke University. There he earned the nickname "the Alaskan Assassin" for his proficiency at three-point shooting. He became the first Alaska-born player in the NBA after being taken 11th overall in the 1999 NBA draft by the Cleveland Cavaliers. After three years with the team, Langdon moved to the EuroLeague, playing nine seasons, most notably with CSKA Moscow, and being named to the EuroLeague's All-Decade Team for the 2000s.
- Colter Lasher (b.1994 in Anchorage) Dimond High school 2012 State Championship, 1st team Allstate 2012, Houston Baptist University 2nd Team All Conference 2010s All Decade Team. Over 1000 career points Geraldton Buccaneers NBL 1 2018, 24.6 pts 8.6 reb 5.6 ast, Geraldton Buccaneers NBL 1 2019 2019 Champion, League MVP Leverkusen Giants Pro A 12.6 pts 6.4 reb 3.4 ast
- Hilary Lindh (b. 1969 in Juneau), alpine skier, four-time National Championship winner, and U.S. Winter Olympian (1988, '92, and '94). She won the silver medal in the women's downhill event in 1992.
- Lance Mackey (b. 1970 in Anchorage), dog musher and winner of back to back Yukon Quest and Iditarod Sled Dog races. Selected as #2 on the 2008 Sports Illustrated list of toughest athletes.
- Cole Magner (b. 1982), former indoor football wide receiver best known as a member of the 2008 Grand Rapids Rampage. From Palmer, Alaska, played traditional gridiron football at Bowling Green State University in Ohio.
- Tommy Moe (b. 1970), alpine skier, five-time National Championship winner, and U.S. Winter Olympian (1992, '94, and '98). He won the gold medal in men's downhill skiing and the silver medal in the men's super-G event in 1994, making him the first American male skier to win multiple medals in a single Olympics; born in Montana, lived and trained in Alaska
- Rashard Odomes (b. 1996 in Anchorage), basketball player in the Israeli Basketball Premier League
- Josh Phelps (b. 1978 in Anchorage), a first baseman/designated hitter for the New York Yankees.
- Kikkan Randall (b. 1982), Nordic skier, seven-time National Champion, five time U.S. Winter Olympian (2002, 2006, 2010, 2014, 2018). She placed 3rd in the individual sprint at Rybinsk, Russia on January 21, 2007, the best American women's finish in a World Cup. She partnered with Jessica Diggins to win the USA's first gold medal ever in cross-country skiing with a 1st-place finish in the women's sprint relay at the 2018 Winter Olympics in Pyeongchang, South Korea. She previously had the best ever American women's finish in the Olympics (9th place in the 2006 individual sprint).
- Curt Schilling (b. 1966 in Anchorage), was a right-handed starting pitcher for the Boston Red Sox. He was a member of the Arizona Diamondbacks' 2001 World Series championship team, and was named co-winner of the World Series MVP Award. Schilling helped lead the Red Sox to a memorable 2004 World Series championship, the team's first since 1918. He pitched a dramatic victory in Game 6 of the 2004 American League Championship Series against the arch-rival New York Yankees, despite a severe ankle injury.
- Mark Schlereth (b. 1966 in Anchorage), a former NFL guard and current football analyst for ESPN. He is featured on the network's NFL Live show and is a regular fill-in host on ESPN Radio's Mike and Mike in the Morning program. Schlereth was selected in the tenth round (#263 overall) of the 1989 NFL draft by the Washington Redskins. He played twelve NFL seasons: six with Washington (1989-1994), and six with the Denver Broncos (1995-2000). He was a member of three Super Bowl championship teams.
- Dave Williams (b. 1979 in Anchorage), a left-handed relief pitcher for the New York Mets.
- Mitch Seavey (b. 1959 in Anchorage), dog musher, 3-time winner of Iditarod. Winning years including 2004, 2013, 2017. He held the world record for his 2017 Iditarod finish time of 8 day, 3 hours, 40 minutes and 13 seconds, until his son Dallas beat it in 2021.
- Allie Ostrander (b. 1996 in Kenai), a professional long-distance runner who has been sponsored by Brooks and NNormal. She was the NCAA Division I steeplechase champion in 2017, 2018 and 2019 for the Boise State Broncos.
