= List of Alaska tornadoes =

List of tornadoes in Alaska

Tornadoes in the U.S. state of Alaska are extremely rare, with only seven tornadoes and 33 funnel clouds ever recorded within state boundaries. The most recent whirlwind event was a funnel cloud that occurred on July 4, 2026, near Cantwell, Alaska. Out of the seven tornadoes that have been recorded, all were rated FU, EFU, F0 or EF0, and none have caused significant damage or injuries.

== Climatology ==
Thunderstorms are fairly rare in most of Alaska but do occur in the interior in the summer with some frequency and may cause wildfires. Anchorage gets a thunderstorm every few years. There has even been the rare thunderstorm in Utqiaġvik on the Arctic coast. While weak tornadoes and waterspouts, while extremely rare, do sometimes occur, Alaska is considered the least tornado-prone state in the United States.

== Events ==
F/EF#	Date	Type	Path length	Deaths	Injuries	Ref.
F0	November 4, 1959	Tornado		0	0	
F0	August 26, 1976	Tornado		0	0	
FU	August 22, 2000	Waterspout		0	0	
A pilot reported a brief waterspout approximately 25 miles (40 km) west of Yakutat.
F0	June 14, 2004	Tornado		0	0	
F0	June 18, 2004	Tornado		0	0	
EF0	August 1, 2009	Tornado		0	0	
EFU	September 24, 2010	Waterspout		0	0	
A strong storm system moved into the Gulf of Alaska on September 24, producing a doppler-indicated waterspout off the coast of Cape Edgecumbe.
EF0	April 19, 2024	Landspout	0.01 miles (0.016 km)	0	0	
A weak landspout briefly touched the ground near Rusty Point.

=== Tornadoes ===
- November 4, 1959 – A brief and weak tornado touched down on the south side of Kayak Island, causing minor damage to trees.
- August 26, 1976 – An extremely weak tornado moved through uninhabited portions of northwestern Alaska, causing no damage.
- June 14, 2004 – 2 brief tornadoes touched down near Bethel, causing minor damage.
- June 18, 2004 – A weak tornado moved through mountainous portions of Western Alaska, causing no damage.
- August 1, 2009 – A brief FU tornado touched down east of Nome, causing little damage to trees.
- April 19, 2024 - A very rare EF0 tornado occurred near Rusty Point, just outside of Anchorage, Alaska, marking the fifth officially recorded tornado to occur in the state. It remained over remote areas and caused no damage.
- July 4, 2026 - South of Denali Highway

=== Waterspouts ===
- December 3, 2007 – Multiple waterspouts were documented by observers in Shelter Island, and none were given an official rating.
- February 8, 2008 – A brief waterspout was reported by multiple observers, although it is unknown if it ever touched down.
- October 25, 2009 – At least 5 brief waterspouts moved through areas north of Ruth Island, and one hit an uninhabited island.
- September 24, 2010 – A relatively long-tracked waterspout moved through the waters off the coast of Sitka, causing no damage. This tornado was never witnessed by an observer but was confirmed by Doppler radar.
- November 1, 2010 – A brief waterspout moved through the offshore regions of Lodge Island and received an FU rating.
