= 100Stone =

Public installation art project in Alaska

Coordinates: 61.186°N 150.021°W

100Stone, also known as the 100 Stone project, is a public installation art project in Alaska. It depicts "personal struggles with mental health, told in sculptural form". Sarah Davies leads the project which also includes Ed Mighell (clay artist), Brian Hutton (community activist), Catherine Shenk (landscape designer; horticulturist), and Lee Holmes (engineer).

== History ==
The project began in summer 2013 and the installation occurred November 2015. By the time of the dedication, 9 December 2015, there were 68 sculptures of humans placed along the coast of Anchorage, Alaska at Point Woronzof Overlook on Northern Lights Boulevard. The figures are created using plaster-covered burlap casts of individuals, plus cement and straw, as well as mannequin parts, such as arms.

Many of the sculptures were damaged by the tides, weather and vandals. The sculptures will be removed from Point Woronzof in April, 2016.
