= List of places in Alaska =

This is a list of places in Alaska, including cities, towns, unincorporated communities, counties, and other recognized places. The list also includes information on the number and names of counties in which the place lies, and its lower and upper zip code bounds, if applicable.

== See also ==
- List of cities in Alaska
- List of boroughs and census areas in Alaska
