= List of college athletic programs in Alaska =

This is a list of college athletic programs in the U.S. state of Alaska.

== NCAA ==
=== Division II ===
Full Division II Members

Team	School	City	Conference	Sport sponsorship				
Team	School	City	Conference	Basketball		Football	Ice hockey	
Team	School	City	Conference	M	W	Football	M	W
Alaska Nanooks	University of Alaska Fairbanks	Fairbanks	Great Northwest	Yes	Yes	No	Yes (Note: Alaska Fairbanks's men's ice hockey team competes in Division I as an independent.)	No
Alaska Anchorage Seawolves	University of Alaska Anchorage	Anchorage	Great Northwest	Yes	Yes	No	Yes (Note: Alaska Anchorage's men's ice hockey team competes in Division I as an independent.)	No

== See also ==
- List of NCAA Division I institutions
- List of NCAA Division II institutions
- List of NCAA Division III institutions
- List of NAIA institutions
- List of USCAA institutions
- List of NCCAA institutions
