= Alaska Department of Health and Social Services =

Government agency in Alaska, United States

The Alaska Department of Health and Social Services is an agency within the government of Alaska, headquartered in Juneau.

== Divisions ==
- Alaska Division of Juvenile Justice
