= Prehistory of Alaska =

Prehistoric Alaska begins with Paleolithic people moving across Beringia into northwestern North America sometime between 40,000 and 15,000 years ago in western Alaska; a date less than 20,000 years ago is most likely. They found their passage blocked by a huge sheet of ice until a temporary recession in the Wisconsin glaciation (the last ice age) opened up an ice-free corridor through northwestern Canada, possibly allowing bands to fan out throughout the rest of the continent. Eventually, Alaska became populated by the Inuit and a variety of Native American groups. Trade with both Asia and southern tribes was active even before the advent of Europeans.

Today, early Alaskans are divided into several main groups: the Southeastern Coastal Native Americans (the Tlingit, Haida, and Tsimshian), the Athabascans, the Aleut, the two groups of Eskimos, and Inupiat and Yup'ik.

== Coastal Native Americans ==
The Coastal Native Americans were probably the first wave of immigrants to cross the Bering land bridge in western Alaska, although many of them initially settled in interior Canada. While there may have been migrations across this land bridge, there is also evidence from recent research that supports the arrival by sea to Alaska's southeastern coast 17,000 years ago. The Tlingit were the most numerous of this group, populating most of the coastal Panhandle by the time of European contact. The southern portion of Prince of Wales Island was settled by the Haidas emigrating from Haida Gwaii in Canada. The Tsimshian emigrated during the territorial period from a town near Prince Rupert in British Columbia. The Tlingit were known to travel for more than 1,000 miles (1,600 km) south to trade with Native peoples in the Pacific Northwest. There was no standard currency of trade, but slaves, native copper materials, and blankets made of red cedar bark, and dog and goat-hair were highly valued.

The Coastal Native Americans believed that fish and animals gave themselves willingly to humans, and strove to honor the animals' sacrifice. They also believed that the bones of a consumed salmon should be returned to the river in which it had been caught—to allow for reincarnation—otherwise, the fish would reincarnate with deformities and refuse to return to that river. Coastal Native American society featured a complex system of property ownership with a mix of private and group property. Each household owned tools, objects, and food that they had produced themselves, while the clan owned names, land, stories, buildings, and most other property.

In the social organization of the Tlingit and Haida, status and prestige were negotiated through wealth. To maintain position, a man of high rank demonstrated wealth by holding a potlatch ceremony in which he would give away, destroy, or invite guests to consume all of his food and possessions. This was referred to as "paying off" the guests who had performed ritual services or provided support in the past. Those who received goods at one potlatch would typically reciprocate by inviting their former hosts to their own potlatch at a later date; such invitations would confirm their relative levels of prestige and status. Other important features of the potlatch were the recitation of family histories and bloodlines, transfer of ceremonial titles and possessions, and offerings to ancestors.

The mild climate and plentiful resources of the Panhandle allowed the Coastal Native Americans leisure time to devote to social pastimes, travel and trade. They enjoyed complex art, music, and storytelling, and their traditions kept an accurate account of genealogy and clan history. The painted designs developed by the Coastal tribes featured fish, animals, and legendary creatures in formalized patterns of black, red, and other bold colors. They decorated their craft goods, domestic utensils, clothing, masks, canoes, and ritual objects to signify ownership. The world-renowned totem poles were carved at great expense to illustrate myths, to honor the deceased, and to imply the enormous wealth of the owners.

== Athabaskans ==
The Athabaskans of Alaska's interior were hunters and inland fishermen. Most lived in small nomadic bands along the numerous rivers of the region. Endurance and physical strength were prized, and game was often run down on foot. Athabascans harvested salmon and hunted rabbits, caribou, and bear with the help of snares, clubs, spears, and bows and arrows. Periods of famine were common. Because they were seminomadic and hunted on foot, footwear was very important, and the Athabascans designed light and flexible snowshoes made of birch and rawhide. The Athabascans used birch bark from the interior forests to make canoes, containers, sleds, and cradles. Clothing was made of animal hides, decorated with porcupine quills colored with natural dyes.

Some Athabascan groups inhabited permanent winter villages and summer fishing camps. Most bands consisted of a few nuclear families and had limited internal organization. Leadership was acquired by warriors or hunters. Athabascans also gave potlatches to mark a death and celebrate a child's first successful hunt, as a prelude to marriage. Those who aspired to leadership were expected to host memorable potlatches, at which the would-be leader would give away all his possessions then prove his prowess by providing for himself and his family for an entire year without outside help.

== Aleuts ==
The Aleuts settled the islands of the Aleutian chain approximately 10,000 years ago. Although their location allowed them easy access to fishing, they also had to contend with unpredictable violent weather, severe earthquakes, and volcanos. Aleut fishing technology included fish spears, weirs, nets, hooks, and lines. Various darts, nets, and harpoons were used to obtain sea lions and sea otters. Whales were usually killed with a poisoned, stone-bladed lance. The job of women and children was to gather shellfish along the beaches at low tide, and berries and other plants in the hills. Aleut women are still today famed for their basketry and sewing techniques, capable of weaving grasses into watertight baskets and sewing seal gut into watertight raincoats suitable for the open ocean.

Aleut society was divided into three categories: honorables, comprising the respected whalers and elders; common people; and slaves. At death, the body of an honorable was mummified, and slaves were occasionally killed in honor of the deceased.

The one- and two-person skin kayaks used by the Aleuts were called "baidarkas" or "bidarkas" by the Russians. These were the model for modern fiberglass kayaks in use today, and are the smallest ocean-going craft made by humans, capable of long journeys in some of the most dangerous seas. Three-person baidarkas were developed at the behest of the Russians, who wanted to ride as passengers in the center; these "three-hole" baidarkas were then adapted for Aleut use in long-distance travel and trade.

== Eskimos ==
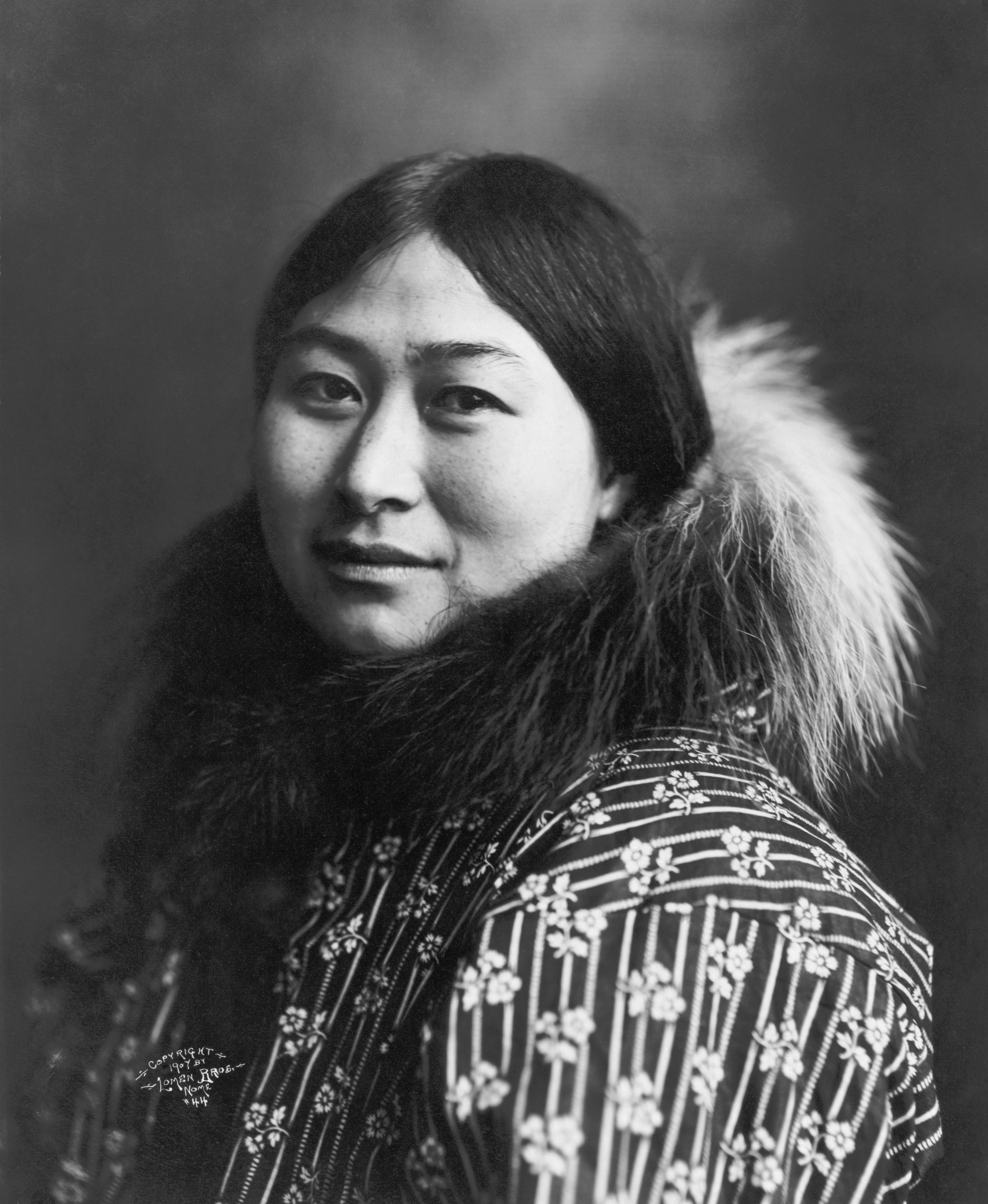
An Inupiaq woman, Nome, Alaska, c. 1907

Eskimos, the Native group most familiar to non-Alaskans, were originally divided into two subgroups: the Inupiat Eskimos settled in Alaska's Arctic region, and the Yup'ik settled in the west. To combat the cold, seasonal food was stored against future shortage, in particular against the privations of each winter. A hunter always divided a fresh kill evenly amongst the community, and status within a village was determined by hunting ability. Eskimo village sites were chosen partly on the basis of the availability of food sources. The Arctic coast people depended on seals, walruses and whales, while the inland Eskimos lived on a diet of caribou, birds, and other small game animals. These people gathered eggs, berries, roots; they ate wild greens fresh, or preserved them in skin containers.

Eskimos used open boats called umiaks, and the smaller kayaks, to hunt large sea mammals. Both vessels were made of a driftwood frame, covered with tightly sewn seal skins. Sleds and dog teams were used for winter travel, and during the summer, dogs were used as pack animals. Women were skilled in basketry and sewing. They stitched and fitted waterproof garments made of animal intestine and fish skins. The Eskimos' everyday clothing of trousers, boots, and coats was sewn from skins and fur, sometimes in complex geometric designs. The coats, which were called parkas, featured an attached hood and a ruff of wolf or bear fur.

Eskimos were known for their carvings, especially their small ivory pieces. In early times, household utensils and weapons were ornamented. Using wood, bone, baleen, walrus ivory, and fossil mammoth tusks, Eskimos crafted dishes, knives, oil lamps, small sculptures, game pieces. Snowgoggles having only small slits to look through to protect their eyes from the glare of snow and ice were carved out of wood or ivory. Replicas of the ulu (women's knives) can be found in most Alaskan tourist shops today.

== See also ==
- Ancient Beringian
- Indigenous Amerindian genetics
- Models of migration to the New World
- Paleo-Indians
