= List of Alaska state forests =

The U.S. state of Alaska has three state forests, which are managed by the Division of Forestry of the Department of Natural Resources.

== Alaska state forests ==
- Haines State Forest - Haines Borough
- Southeast State Forest - Prince of Wales-Hyder Census Area
- Tanana Valley State Forest - Fairbanks North Star Borough

== See also ==
- List of national forests of the United States
