= Seal of Alaska =

Official Government Emblem of the U.S. State of Alaska

The Seal of the State of Alaska
- Armiger: State of Alaska
- Adopted: 1959

The seal of the state of Alaska is the official state seal of the American state of Alaska. It was first adopted before statehood, when the area was known as the District of Alaska. The current seal dates back to 1910 and has been used since Alaska's accession to statehood within the United States.

== History of design ==
The first governor of the District of Alaska, John Henry Kinkead, designated a seal for the district which featured glaciers, northern lights, igloos and an Inuk person ice fishing.

In 1910, this seal was replaced with a design more representative of the state's industrial and natural wealth. This was done at the request of the Governor of the District of Alaska, Walter Eli Clark, on the grounds that he felt the old seal focussed too much on icebergs, the Northern Lights and Native Americans. Accordingly, he asked an anonymous draftsman in Juneau to design a new Seal, which was subsequently adopted. Today's seal contains rays above the mountains that represent the Alaskan northern lights. The smelter symbolizes mining, the train stands for Alaska's railroads and ships denote transportation by sea. The trees pictured in the seal symbolize the state's wealth of timber, and the farmer, his horse and the three shocks of wheat stand for Alaskan agriculture. The fish and the seals signify the importance of fishing and seal rookeries to Alaska's economy.

The physical seal is officially kept by the Lieutenant Governor of Alaska (formerly known as the Secretary of State) and is responsible for using it to confirm state regulations.

== Historical seals ==
Seal of the District of Alaska

Seal of the Territory of Alaska

== See also ==
- List of Alaska state symbols
- Flag of Alaska
