= Climate of Alaska =

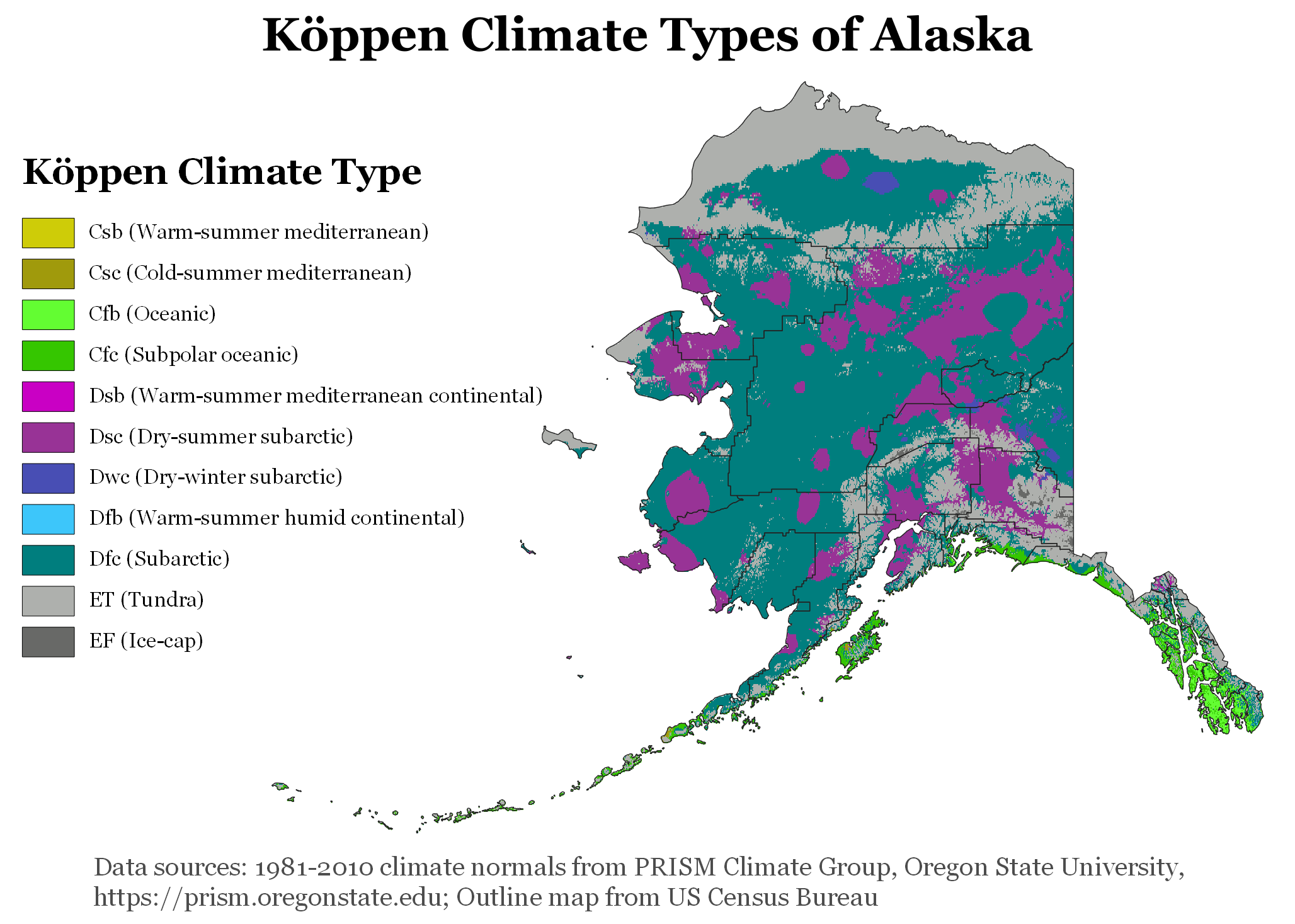
Köppen climate types of Alaska, using 1981-2010 climate normals.

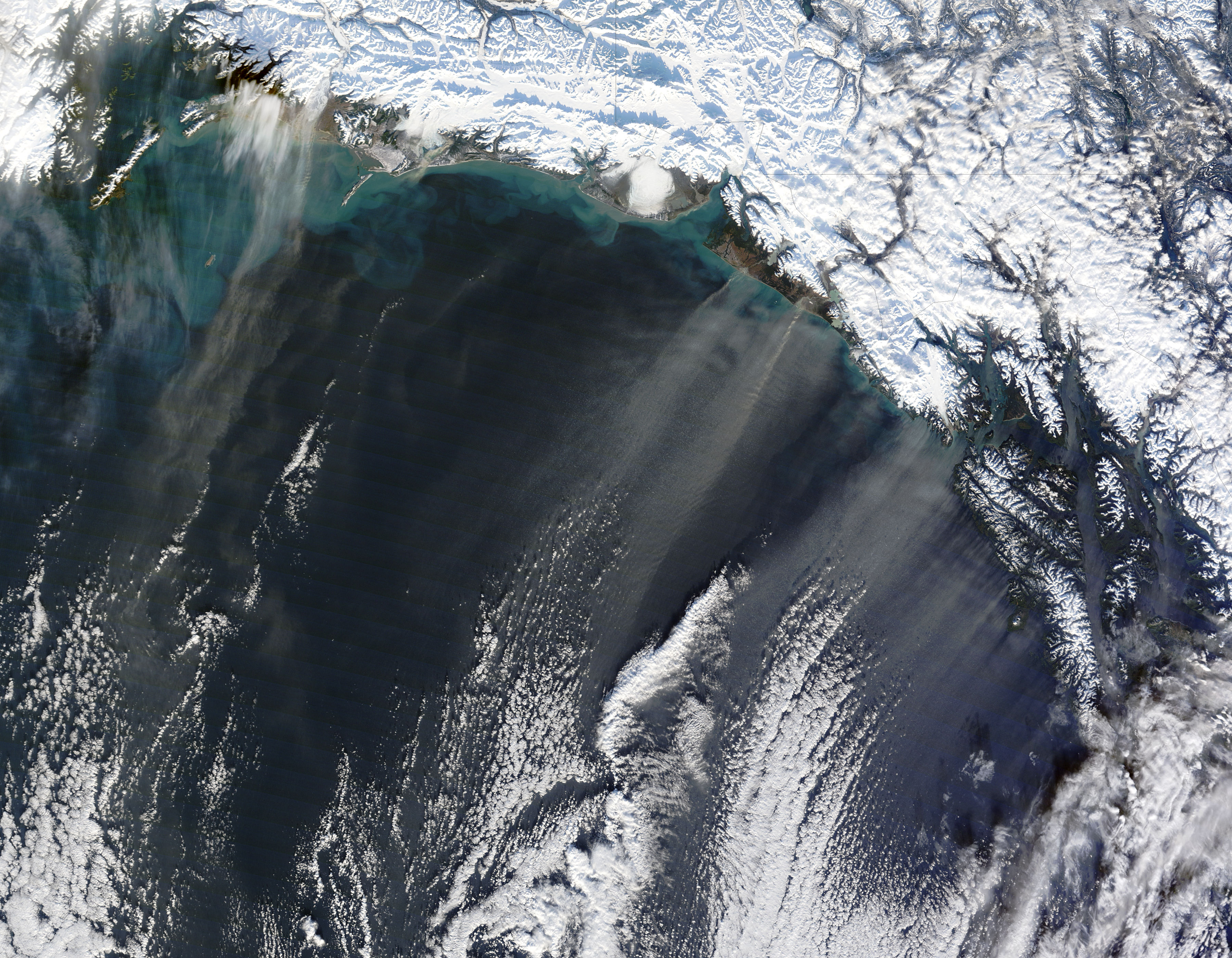
Natural-color satellite image showing thin plumes of beige dust blowing off the Alaskan coast.

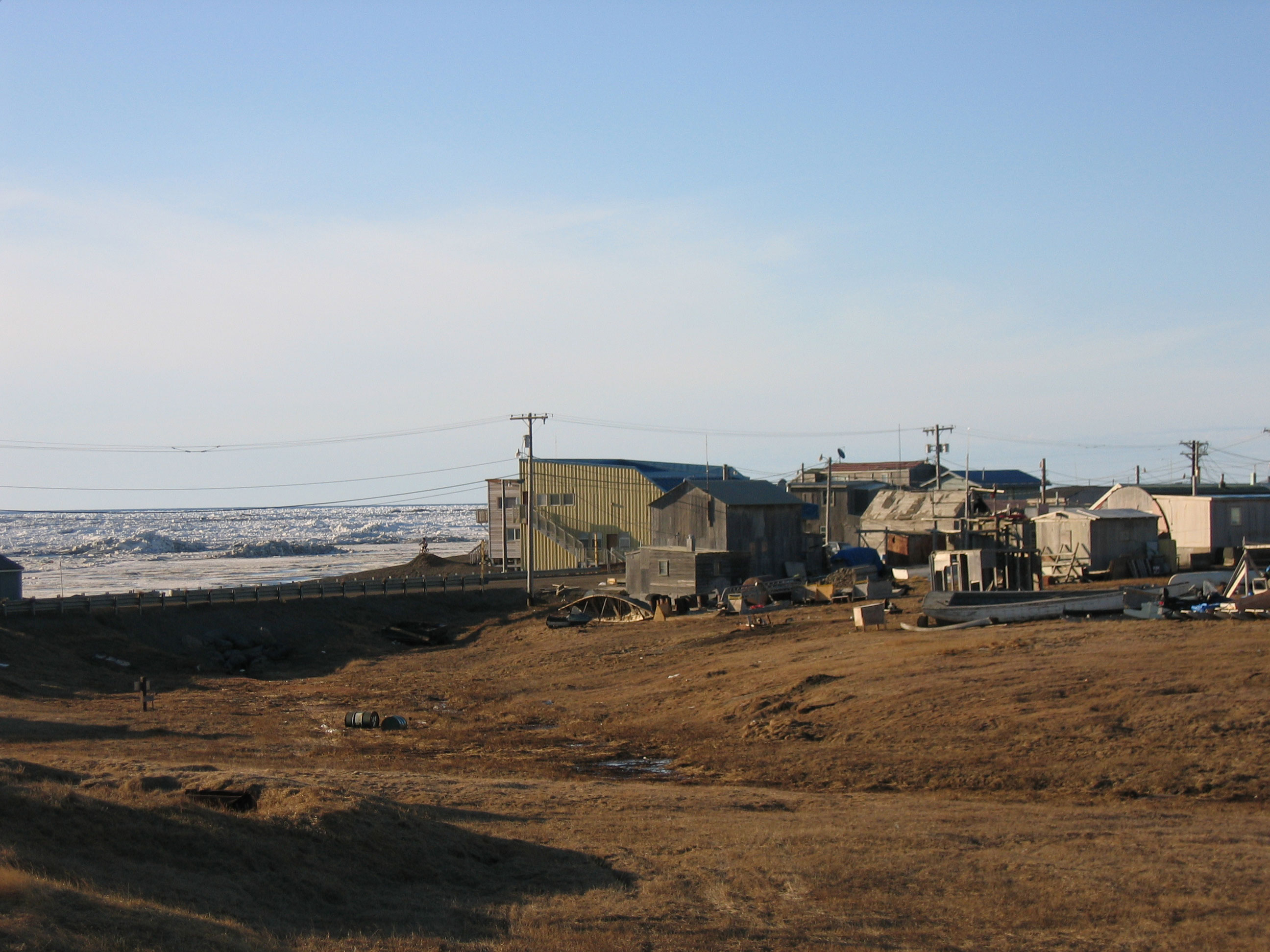
Utqiaġvik, Alaska is the northernmost city in the United States.

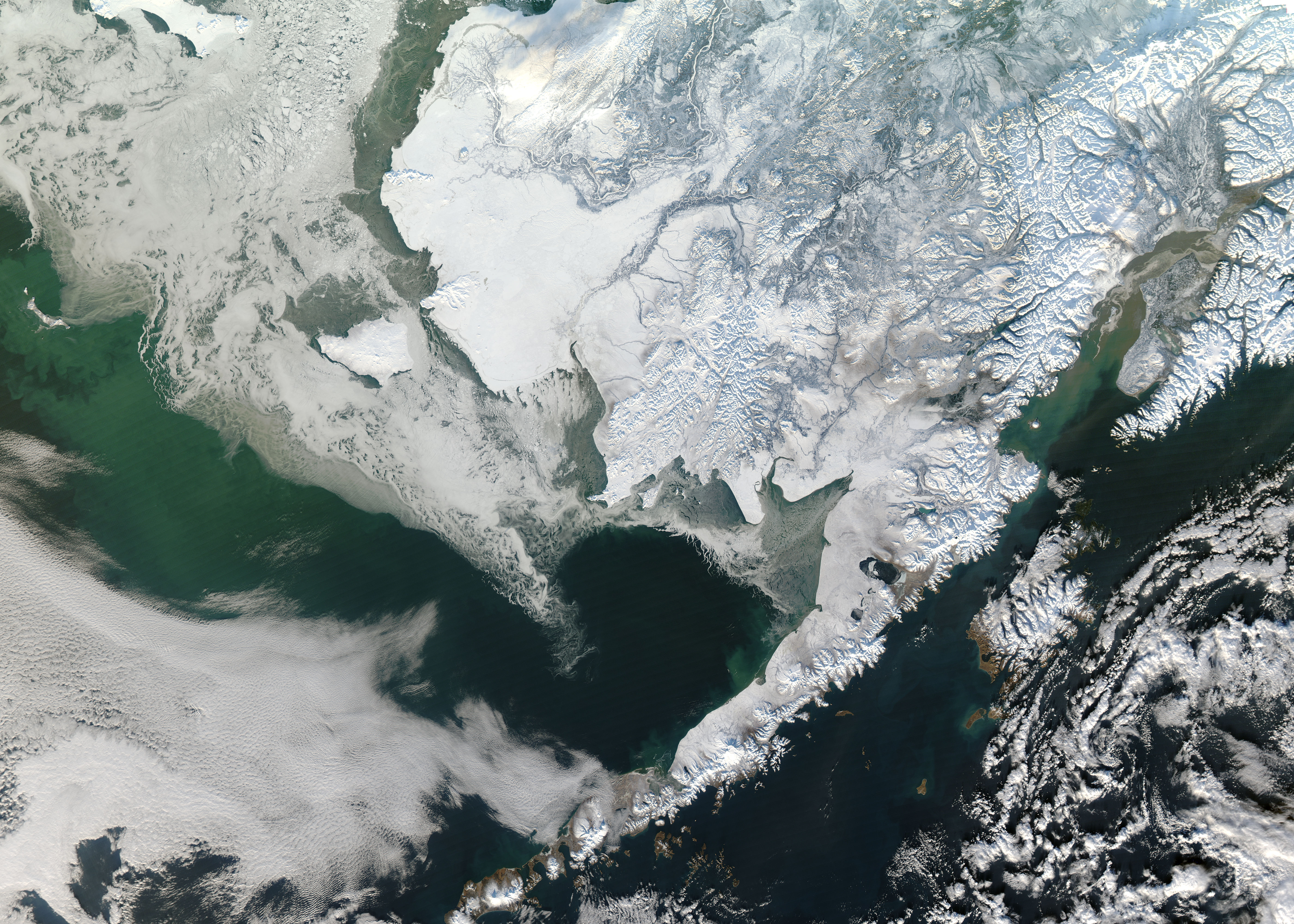
Alaska covered by snow in the winter.

The climate of Alaska is determined by average temperatures and precipitation received statewide over many years. The extratropical storm track runs along the Aleutian Island chain, across the Alaska Peninsula, and along the coastal area of the Gulf of Alaska which exposes these parts of the state to a large majority of the storms crossing the North Pacific. The climate in Juneau and the southeast panhandle is a mid-latitude oceanic climate (similar to Scotland, or Haida Gwaii), (Köppen Cfb) in the southern sections and a subarctic oceanic climate (Köppen Cfc) in the northern parts.

The climate in Southcentral Alaska is a subarctic climate (Köppen Dfc) due to its short, cool summers. The climate of the interior of Alaska is best described as extreme and represents a classic example of a true subarctic climate. The region holds both of the state’s official temperature records: the highest, 100 °F (38 °C) at Fort Yukon on June 27, 1915, and the lowest, −80 °F (−62 °C) at Prospect Creek Camp on January 23, 1971. Although Alaska stretches roughly 2,400 kilometres (1,500 miles) from its southernmost to northernmost point and covers more than 1,700,000 square kilometres (660,000 square miles) of vast and varied terrain, these record extremes were measured in the interior 240 kilometres (150 miles) apart, an unexpectedly close proximity given the size of the state. The climate in the very far north of Alaska is an Arctic climate (Köppen ET) with long, cold winters, and cool summers where snow is possible year-round.

== Temperature ==
=== Southeast ===
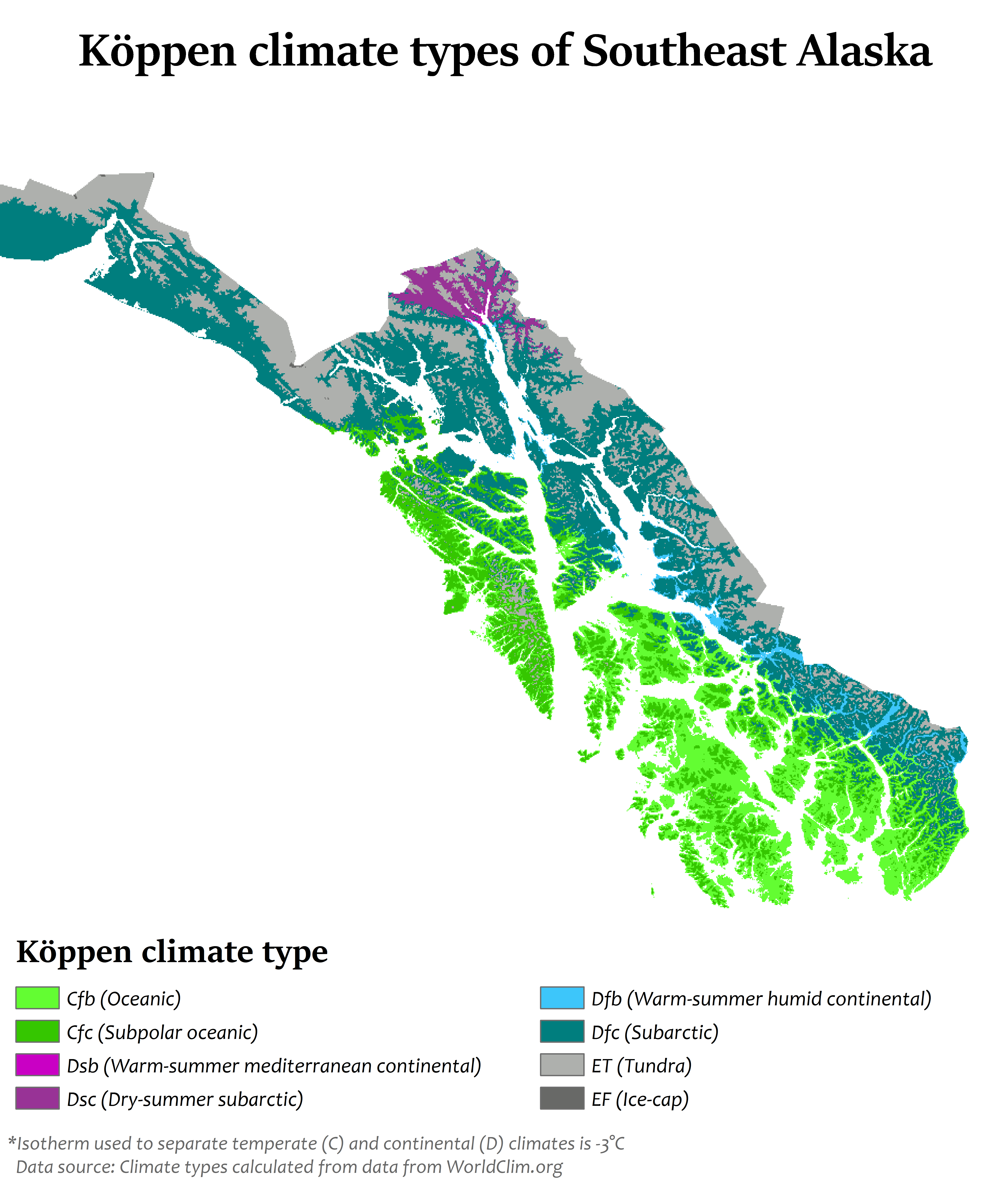
Köppen climate types in SE Alaska

The climate in Juneau and the Southeast panhandle is a mid-latitude oceanic climate (Köppen climate classification Cfb) in the southern sections and an oceanic, marine subpolar climate (similar to Scotland, or Haida Gwaii), (Köppen Cfc) in the northern parts. Much of the southern parts are temperate rainforest. On an annual basis, southern portions are both the wettest and warmest part of Alaska, with milder temperatures in the winter and high precipitation throughout the year. Average monthly precipitation is generally highest in the autumn months, especially October, and lowest in May or June. This is the only region in Alaska in which the average daytime high temperature is above freezing during the winter months, except for in the southern parts of the Aleutian Islands such as Unalaska.

=== South ===
The climate in south central Alaska, with Anchorage as a typical city, is mild by Alaskan standards. This is due in large part to its proximity to the coast. While it does not get nearly as much rain as the southeast of Alaska, it does get more snow, and days tend to be clearer there. It is a subarctic climate (Köppen Dfc) due to its short, cool summers. There are frequent, strong southeast winds known as the Knik wind in the vicinity of Palmer, especially in the winter months.

=== West ===
The climate of Western Alaska is determined largely by the Bering Sea and the Gulf of Alaska. It is a subarctic oceanic climate in the southwest and a continental subarctic climate farther north. The temperature is somewhat moderate considering how far north the area is. This area has a tremendous amount of variety, especially when considering precipitation. The northern side of the Seward Peninsula is technically a desert with less than 10 inches (254 mm) of precipitation annually, while some locations between Dillingham and Bethel average around 100 inches (2,540 mm) of precipitation.

=== East ===
The climate of the east of Alaska is best described as extreme and is an excellent example of a true continental subarctic climate. Some of the hottest and coldest temperatures in Alaska occur around the area near Fairbanks. The summers can have temperatures reaching into the 90s °F (near 34 °C). In the winter, the temperature can fall below −50 °F (−45.6 °C), and in rare cases, below −60 °F (−51.1 °C). Precipitation is generally sparse around the year, peaking during the summer months, and virtually all precipitation between October and April falls as snow. Ice fog is a significant hazard during especially cold periods between November and March.

=== North ===
The climate in the extreme north of Alaska is what would be expected for an area north of the Arctic Circle. It is an Arctic climate (Köppen ET) with long, very cold winters and short, cool summers. The sun does not rise at all during some weeks in the winter, and is out for 24 hours during some weeks in the summer. Despite 24 hours of sunshine in the summertime, the average low temperature is barely above freezing in Utqiaġvik in July, at 36 °F (2.2 °C) and snow may fall any month of the year. North Alaska is the coldest region in Alaska.

=== Temperature comparison ===

Monthly average highs and lows for various cities and towns in Alaska in Fahrenheit and Celsius
City	Jan	Feb	Mar	Apr	May	Jun	Jul	Aug	Sep	Oct	Nov	Dec
Anchorage	23 / 11 (−5 / −12)	28 / 16 (−2 / −9)	34 / 18 (1 / −8)	46 / 30 (8 / −1)	57 / 40 (14 / 4)	64 / 48 (18 / 9)	66 / 53 (19 / 12)	64 / 51 (18 / 11)	56 / 43 (13 / 6)	42 / 31 (6 / −1)	29 / 18 (−2 / −8)	25 / 14 (−4 / −10)
Utqiaġvik	−4 / −18 (−20 / −28)	−4 / −18 (−20 / −28)	−3 / −17 (−19 / −27)	12 / −2 (−11 / −19)	28 / 18 (−2 / −8)	43 / 31 (6 / −1)	49 / 36 (9 / 2)	46 / 35 (8 / 2)	38 / 30 (3 / −1)	27 / 17 (−3 / −8)	13 / 0 (−11 / −18)	1 / −12 (−17 / −24)
Fairbanks	1 / −17 (−17 / −27)	12 / −11 (−11 / −24)	25 / −3 (−4 / −19)	46 / 22 (8 / −6)	62 / 39 (17 / 4)	72 / 50 (22 / 10)	73 / 53 (23 / 12)	66 / 48 (19 / 9)	55 / 36 (13 / 2)	34 / 18 (1 / −8)	12 / −4 (−11 / −20)	4 / −13 (−16 / −25)
Fort Yukon	−8 / −22 (−22 / −30)	2 / −18 (−17 / −28)	16 / −8 (−9 / −22)	39 / 17 (4 / −8)	60 / 38 (16 / 3)	72 / 51 (22 / 11)	74 / 53 (23 / 12)	66 / 46 (19 / 8)	52 / 34 (11 / 1)	30 / 17 (−1 / −8)	3 / −10 (−16 / −23)	−4 / −18 (−20 / −28)
Juneau (downtown)	34 / 27 (1 / −3)	37 / 28 (3 / −2)	40 / 30 (4 / −1)	49 / 36 (9 / 2)	57 / 43 (14 / 6)	62 / 49 (17 / 9)	64 / 52 (18 / 11)	63 / 51 (17 / 11)	57 / 46 (14 / 8)	49 / 39 (9 / 4)	40 / 32 (4 / 0)	36 / 29 (2 / −2)
Sitka	41 / 32 (5 / 0)	41 / 32 (5 / 0)	42 / 33 (6 / 1)	48 / 37 (9 / 3)	54 / 43 (12 / 6)	58 / 48 (14 / 9)	60 / 53 (16 / 12)	62 / 53 (17 / 12)	58 / 49 (14 / 9)	51 / 42 (11 / 6)	44 / 36 (7 / 2)	42 / 33 (6 / 1)
Craig	39 / 33 (4 / 1)	40 / 32 (4 / 0)	42 / 33 (6 / 1)	47 / 37 (8 / 3)	53 / 43 (12 / 6)	57 / 48 (14 / 9)	59 / 52 (15 / 11)	61 / 53 (16 / 12)	57 / 48 (14 / 9)	50 / 42 (10 / 6)	43 / 36 (6 / 2)	40 / 34 (4 / 1)
Kodiak	36 / 26 (2 / −3)	38 / 27 (3 / −3)	39 / 28 (4 / −2)	45 / 34 (7 / 1)	52 / 40 (11 / 4)	57 / 46 (14 / 8)	62 / 50 (17 / 10)	63 / 50 (17 / 10)	57 / 44 (14 / 7)	48 / 36 (9 / 2)	40 / 30 (4 / −1)	37 / 27 (3 / −3)
Kotzebue	6 / −7 (−14 / −22)	10 / −5 (−12 / −21)	10 / −5 (−12 / −21)	25 / 10 (−4 / −12)	40 / 29 (4 / −2)	55 / 43 (13 / 6)	61 / 52 (16 / 11)	58 / 49 (14 / 9)	49 / 40 (9 / 4)	32 / 24 (0 / −4)	17 / 7 (−8 / −14)	10 / −3 (−12 / −19)
Nome	13 / −2 (−11 / −19)	17 / 1 (−8 / −17)	18 / 2 (−8 / −17)	29 / 16 (−2 / −9)	44 / 31 (7 / −1)	55 / 42 (13 / 6)	58 / 46 (14 / 8)	56 / 44 (13 / 7)	49 / 37 (9 / 3)	36 / 25 (2 / −4)	24 / 12 (−4 / −11)	16 / 2 (−9 / −17)
Unalaska	37 / 29 (3 / −2)	38 / 30 (3 / −1)	39 / 30 (4 / −1)	41 / 33 (5 / 1)	46 / 38 (8 / 3)	52 / 43 (11 / 6)	57 / 47 (14 / 8)	59 / 49 (15 / 9)	54 / 45 (12 / 7)	48 / 39 (9 / 4)	43 / 34 (6 / 1)	39 / 31 (4 / −1)
St. Paul	29 / 21 (−2 / −6)	29 / 21 (−2 / −6)	29 / 20 (−2 / −7)	34 / 26 (1 / −3)	40 / 32 (4 / 0)	47 / 38 (8 / 3)	51 / 44 (11 / 7)	53 / 46 (12 / 8)	50 / 41 (10 / 5)	43 / 35 (6 / 2)	37 / 30 (3 / −1)	33 / 24 (1 / −4)

=== Data ===
The highest and lowest recorded temperatures in Alaska are both in the Interior. The highest is 100 °F (37.8 °C) in Fort Yukon on June 27, 1915. The lowest Alaska temperature is −80 °F (−62.2 °C) in Prospect Creek on January 23, 1971, 1 °F (0.6 °C) above the lowest temperature recorded in continental North America (in Snag, Yukon, Canada). Alaska holds the extreme US record low temperatures for every month except September, where Big Piney, Wyoming recorded −15 °F or −26.1 °C on September 20, 1983. The coldest temperature recorded in Alaska in September was −13 °F or −25 °C in Arctic Village on September 30, 1970.

Climate data for Alaska (averages based on the years of 1991–2020)
Month	Jan	Feb	Mar	Apr	May	Jun	Jul	Aug	Sep	Oct	Nov	Dec	Year
Record high °F (°C)	67 (19)	66 (19)	71 (22)	82 (28)	93 (34)	100 (38)	99 (37)	99 (37)	91 (33)	76 (24)	67 (19)	67 (19)	100 (38)
Mean daily maximum °F (°C)	10.7 (−11.8)	16.2 (−8.8)	21.2 (−6.0)	35 (2)	49 (9)	59.9 (15.5)	62.3 (16.8)	58 (14)	48.3 (9.1)	33.3 (0.7)	19.2 (−7.1)	13.3 (−10.4)	35.5 (1.9)
Daily mean °F (°C)	4.2 (−15.4)	8.7 (−12.9)	12.3 (−10.9)	26.2 (−3.2)	40.1 (4.5)	50.9 (10.5)	54.1 (12.3)	50.4 (10.2)	41.4 (5.2)	27.3 (−2.6)	13.3 (−10.4)	7 (−14)	28.0 (−2.2)
Mean daily minimum °F (°C)	−2.4 (−19.1)	1.2 (−17.1)	3.5 (−15.8)	17.4 (−8.1)	31.2 (−0.4)	41.9 (5.5)	45.9 (7.7)	42.8 (6.0)	34.5 (1.4)	21.2 (−6.0)	7.3 (−13.7)	0.7 (−17.4)	20.4 (−6.4)
Record low °F (°C)	−80 (−62)	−75 (−59)	−68 (−56)	−50 (−46)	−25 (−32)	−11 (−24)	8 (−13)	−6 (−21)	−13 (−25)	−48 (−44)	−62 (−52)	−72 (−58)	−80 (−62)
Average precipitation inches (mm)	2.82 (72)	2.39 (61)	2.11 (54)	1.90 (48)	2.12 (54)	2.42 (61)	3.48 (88)	4.57 (116)	4.96 (126)	4.23 (107)	3.50 (89)	3.14 (80)	37.64 (956)
Source 1: NOAA Climate at A Glance
Source 2: Western Regional Climate Center

== Precipitation ==
Juneau averages over 50 inches (1,270 mm) of precipitation a year, while some other areas in southeast Alaska receive as much as 275 inches (6,980 mm). Average monthly precipitation generally peaks in September or October, and is lowest in May and June. Owing to the rain shadow of the coastal mountains, south-central Alaska does not get nearly as much rain as the southeast of Alaska, though it does get more snow, with up to 300 inches (762.00 cm) at Valdez and much more in the mountains.

On average, Anchorage receives 16 inches (410 mm) of precipitation a year, with around 75 inches (1.91 m) of snow. The northern coast of the Gulf of Alaska receives up to 150 inches (3,810.0 mm) of precipitation annually. Across the western sections of the state, the northern side of the Seward Peninsula is a desert with less than 10 inches (250 mm) of precipitation annually, while some locations between Dillingham and Bethel average around 100 inches (2,540 mm) of precipitation.

Inland, often less than 10 inches (254 mm) falls a year and on the North Slope as little as 4 inches (100 mm) of rainfall equivalent and 30 inches (0.76 m) of snow is typical, but what snow falls during the winter tends to stay throughout the season. Thunderstorms are fairly rare in most of Alaska, but do occur in the interior in the summer with some frequency and may cause wildfires. Anchorage gets a thunderstorm every few years. There has even been the rare thunderstorm in Utqiaġvik on the Arctic coast. While weak tornadoes and waterspouts, while extremely rare, do sometimes occur, Alaska is considered the least tornado-prone state in the United States.

La Niña events lead to drier and cooler than normal conditions, while El Niño events leads to warmer than normal temperatures but do not have a correlation towards dry or wet conditions. Precipitation increases by 10–40% when the Pacific decadal oscillation is positive.

== See also ==
- List of Alaska tropical cyclones
- List of Alaska tornadoes
