= Solar power in Alaska =

Overview of solar power in the U.S. state of Alaska

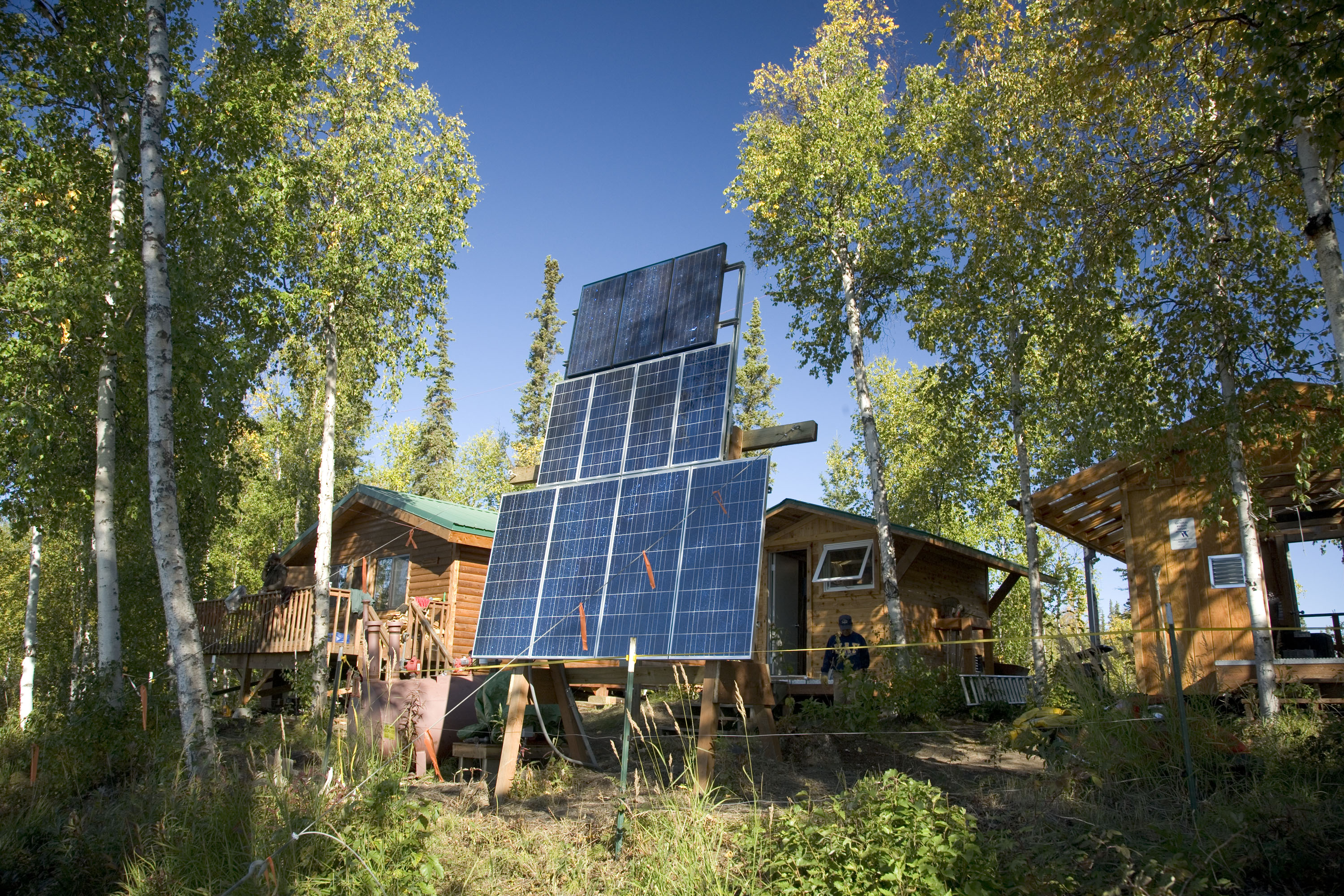
Solar panels in Kanuti National Wildlife Refuge

Solar power in Alaska has been primarily used in remote locations, such as the Nenana Teen Center near Fairbanks, where long summer days provide most of the electricity generated. In 2015, Alaska ranked 45th in installed solar among U.S. states. Rooftop solar panels could provide 23% of all electricity used in Alaska. Net metering is available for PV systems up to 25 kW but is limited to 1.5% of average demand. IREC best practices, based on experience, recommends no limits to net metering, individual or aggregate, and perpetual roll over of kWh credits.

In 2011, Alaska's largest solar array was the 17.28 kW array installed on a building in Anchorage. A 12 kW solar array installed in Lime Village in July 2001 helped reduce electricity costs.

Annual insolation and thus power production per capacity installed in Alaska is similar to central Europe, where Germany became a leader in worldwide solar power use in the years around 2010.

The Houston Solar Farm in Matanuska-Susitna Borough is the state's largest solar facility, at 8.5 MW, built in 2023. The project is designed with steeply angled and elevated bifacial panels and wide spacing between rows to accommodate snow removal and shade reduction. The project will be used for agrivoltaics research.

The Puppy Dog Lake Project in Nikiski, on the Kenai Peninsula, is planned to be 30 MW.

== Currently operating (Note: As of December 31, 2025) ==
=== Far North (Arctic) region ===
Based on the EIA dataset, there are currently no operable utility-scale solar facilities located in Alaska's Far North (Arctic) region (such as the North Slope Borough).

=== Interior region ===
Based on the EIA dataset, there are currently no operable utility-scale solar facilities located within the Interior region of Alaska.

=== Southeast region (The Inside Passage) ===
Based on the EIA dataset, there are currently no operable utility-scale solar facilities located within the Southeast (The Inside Passage) region of Alaska.

=== Southcentral region ===
Solar Facilities in Alaska (Southcentral Region)
#	Plant Name	Utility Name	County/Borough	Capacity (MW)	Operating Year
1	Houston Solar	Energy 49, LLC	Matanuska Susitna	6.0	2023

=== Southwest region ===
Solar Facilities in Alaska (Southwest Region)
#	Plant Name	Utility Name	County/Borough	Capacity (MW)	Operating Year
1	Kotzebue Hybrid	Kotzebue Electric Assn Inc	Northwest Arctic	0.8	2020
2	Kotzebue Hybrid	Kotzebue Electric Assn Inc	Northwest Arctic	0.9	2023

== Statistics ==
Source: NREL

Grid-connected PV capacity (MWp)
Year	Capacity	Change	% change
2010	<0.1		
2011	<0.1		
2012	<0.1		
2013	0.2	0.2	>100%
2014	0.39	0.21	20%
2015	0.72	0.33	85%
2016	0.95	0.23	32%
2017	1.75	0.8	84%
2018	2.78	1.23	70%
2019	7.78	5	180%
2020	12.1	4.32	56%
2021	15.4	3.3	27%
2022	18	2.6	%

== See also ==
- List of power stations in Alaska
- Wind power in Alaska
- Solar power in the United States
- Renewable energy in the United States
