= Sheep Creek =

Sheep Creek is a geographical place name. With variations, the name is given to hundreds of bodies of water, roads, canals, reservoirs and populated areas in the United States and other countries. It is the name of a tributary to Lockyear Creek in Queensland, Australia, and the name of at least three bodies of water in Canada. The U.S. state of Montana has 85 different locales that bear that name or a derivation . The U.S. state of Idaho has 92 natural and man-made areas that incorporate Sheep Creek into their names. Nature areas that include trails named Sheep Creek can be found in Canada's Yukon Territory, Colorado's Larimer County and in Utah's Bryce Canyon National Park.

== Australia ==
- Sheep Creek, tributary of Lockyer Creek (Queensland)

== Canada ==
- Sheep Creek, tributary of the Smoky River (Alberta)
- Big Sheep Creek (British Columbia)
- McLeod (or McCloud) Creek, formerly Sheep Creek, associated with the Lost Charlie McLeod Mine (Northwest Territories)

== Romania ==
- Beica River, translated as Sheep Creek (Gurghiu Mountains)

== United States ==
=== Alabama ===
- Sheep Creek (Cleburne County) 33.622°N 85.514°W

=== Alaska ===
According to the GNIS, the state of Alaska has 40 different locales with variations of the name Sheep Creek, including the following:

- Sheep Creek (Juneau)58.261°N 134.323°W
- Thane, neighborhood originally named Sheep Creek (Juneau)58.264°N 134.330°W
- Sheep Creek Trail, Kluane National Park and Reserve (Yukon Territory)

=== Arizona ===
- Sheep Dip Creek (Apache County) 36.344°N 109.576°W
- Sheep Creek (Coconino County) 34.286°N 110.805°W
- Sheep Creek Point, cape (Coconino County) 34.298°N 110.800°W
- Sheep Creek (Maricopa County) 33.918°N 111.650°W
- Sheep Creek Seep, spring (Maricopa County) 33.995°N 111.549°W
- South Fork Sheep Creek (Maricopa County) 33.930°N 111.629°W
- Upper Sheep Creek Spring (Maricopa County) 33.925°N 111.521°W
- Sheep Creek (Yavapai County) 34.881°N 113.245°W
- Sheep Creek Cabin (Yavapai County) 34.003°N 111.555°W

=== Arkansas ===
- Sheep Jump Creek (Marion County) 36.116°N 92.443°W

=== California ===
According to the GNIS, the state of California has 25 different locales with variations of the name Sheep Creek, including the following:

- Sheep Creek Campground (Fresno County) 36.792°N 118.679°W
- Sheep Creek (Ventura County) 34.673°N 119.036°W

=== Colorado ===
According to the GNIS, the state of Colorado has 36 different locales with variations of the name Sheep Creek, including the following:

- Sheep Creek (Conejos County) 37.081°N 106.304°W
- Sheep Creek Trail (Larimer County) 40.553°N 105.389°W

=== Georgia ===
- Sheep Creek (Hancock County) 33.173°N 83.018°W

=== Idaho ===
According to the GNIS, the state of Idaho has 92 different locales with variations of the name Sheep Creek, including the following:

- Sheep Creek (Bannock County) 42.510°N 112.33°W
- Sheep Creek (Owyhee County)
- Sheep Creek Reservoir (Bear Lake County) 42.242°N 111.144°W

=== Indiana ===
- Sheep Creek (Elkhart County) 41.705°N 85.873°W

=== Kentucky ===
- Sheep Creek (Whitley County) 36.660°N 84.189°W

=== Missouri ===
- Sheep Creek (Caldwell County) 39.688°N 94.102°W
- East Sheep Creek (Caldwell County) 39.704°N 94.110°W
- West Sheep Creek (Caldwell County) 39.718°N 94.115°W

=== Montana ===
According to the GNIS, the state of Montana has 85 different locales with variations of the name Sheep Creek, including the following:

- Sheep Creek (Fallon County) 45.934°N 104.00°W
- Sheep Creek Trail (Flathead County) 48.206°N 113.661°W
- Sheep Creek Bridge, NRHP (Lewis and Clark County) 46.977°N 112.081°W
- Sheep Creek Reservoir (Powder River County) 45.656°N 105.970°W

=== Nebraska ===
- Sheep Creek (Furnas County) 40.065°N 99.697°W
- Dry Sheep Creek (Sioux County) 41.985°N 103.967°W
- Sheep Creek Election Precinct (Sioux County) 42.122°N 103.834°W

=== Nevada ===
According to the GNIS, the state of Nevada has 33 different locales with variations of the name Sheep Creek, including the following:

- Sheep Creek Range (Lander County) 40.826°N 116.721°W

=== New Jersey ===
- Sheep Pen Creek (Cumberland County) 39.344°N 75.280°W

=== New Mexico ===
- Sheep Spring Creek (Colfax County) 36.920°N 104.664°W
- Sheep Creek (Grant County) 33.169°N 107.878°W
- Sheep Creek (San Miguel County) 35.738°N 105.572°W

=== North Carolina ===
- Sheep Pen Creek (Carteret County) 34.828°N 76.348°W
- Sheep Creek (Currituck) 36.243°N 75.791°W
- Sheep Cliff Creek (Jackson County) 35.152°N 83.100°W

=== North Dakota ===
- Sheep Creek, tributary of the Cannonball River (Bowman County) 45.934°N 104.004°W

=== Oklahoma ===
- Sheep Creek (Pontotoc County) 34.615°N 96.551°W

=== Oregon ===
According to the GNIS, the state of Oregon has 57 different locales with variations of the name Sheep Creek, including the following:

- Oregon Route 350, known as Little Sheep Creek Highway No. 350
- Big Sheep Creek (Wallowa County) 45.558°N 116.835°W
- Sheep Creek Siphon, canal (Malheur County) 43.908°N 117.083°W

=== South Dakota ===
- Sheep Creek (Harding County) 45.934°N 104.004°W
- Sheep Creek (Perkins County) 45.172°N 102.876°W

=== Texas ===
- Sheep Creek, west of Elephant Mountain (Brewster County) 29.070°N 103.570°W
- Sheep Creek (Callahan County) 32.455°N 99.242°W
- Sheep Creek (Fannin County) 30.715°N 99.465°W
- Sheep Creek (Knox County) 33.652°N 99.773°W
- Sheep Creek Run (Mason County) 30.715°N 99.465°W

=== Utah ===
According to the GNIS, the state of Utah has 31 different locales with variations of the name Sheep Creek, including the following:

- Sheep Creek (Daggett County) 40.922°N 109.696°W
- Sheep Creek Connecting Trail, Bryce Canyon National Park (Garfield County) 37.57°N 112.202°W

=== Virginia ===
- Sheep Creek (Bedford County) 37.391°N 79.556°W
- Sheep Creek (Rockbridge County) 37.799°N 79.335°W

=== Washington ===
According to the GNIS, the state of Washington has 21 different locales with variations of the name Sheep Creek, including the following:

- Sheep Creep Spring (Asotin County) 46.000°N 117.442°W
- Sheep Creek {Chelan County} 48.030°N 120.570°W

=== West Virginia ===
- Sheep Run (Ritchie County) 39.171°N 81.190°W

=== Wisconsin ===
- Sheep Ranch Creek, stream (Taylor County) 45.306°N 90.207°W

=== Wyoming ===
According to the GNIS, the state of Wyoming has 55 different locales with variations of the name Sheep Creek, including the following:

- Sheep Creek Mine (Albany County) 42.232°N 105.816°W
- East Fork Sheep Creek (Fremont County) 43.431°N 108.643°W
- Sheep Creek Oilfield (Fremont County) 42.398°N 107.786°W
- Sheep Dip Creek (Lincoln County) 42.013°N 110.545°W
