= List of power stations in Alaska =

Sources of Alaska utility-scale electricity generation in gigawatt-hours, full-year 2025:
1. Natural gas: 2,601 (40.3%)
2. Hydroelectric: 1,850 (28.7%)
3. Petroleum: 1,024 (15.9%)
4. Coal: 790 (12.2%)
5. Wind: 130 (2.02%)
6. Biomass: 41 (0.64%)
7. Solar: 13 (0.20%)

This is a list of electricity-generating power stations in the U.S. state of Alaska, sorted by type and name. In 2024, Alaska had a total summer capacity of 2.9 gigawatts through all of its power plants, and a net generation of 6,691 gigawatt-hours. The electrical energy generation mix in 2025 was 40.3% natural gas, 28.7% hydroelectric, 15.9% petroleum, 12.2% coal, 2% wind, 0.6% biomass and 0.2% solar. The nation's only coal plant constructed since 2015 began operations in February 2020 at the University of Fairbanks.

A grid known as "the Railbelt" serves about two-thirds of the state's population; extending from Fairbanks through Anchorage and into the Kenai Peninsula. Many of Alaska's power stations are diesel generators which service isolated communities and their localized transmission and distribution networks. Alaska is second behind Hawaii in the consumption of petroleum for electricity generation. The Alaska Village Electric Cooperative serves 58 communities in rural Alaska. Many rural residential customers receive the Power Cost Equalization subsidy to bring high electric costs closer to what urban residents pay. The state has vast untapped renewable resources, including wind near its coastlines, hydropower in its high-precipitation mountain regions, biomass from its forest and agriculture products, and solar from its rooftops.

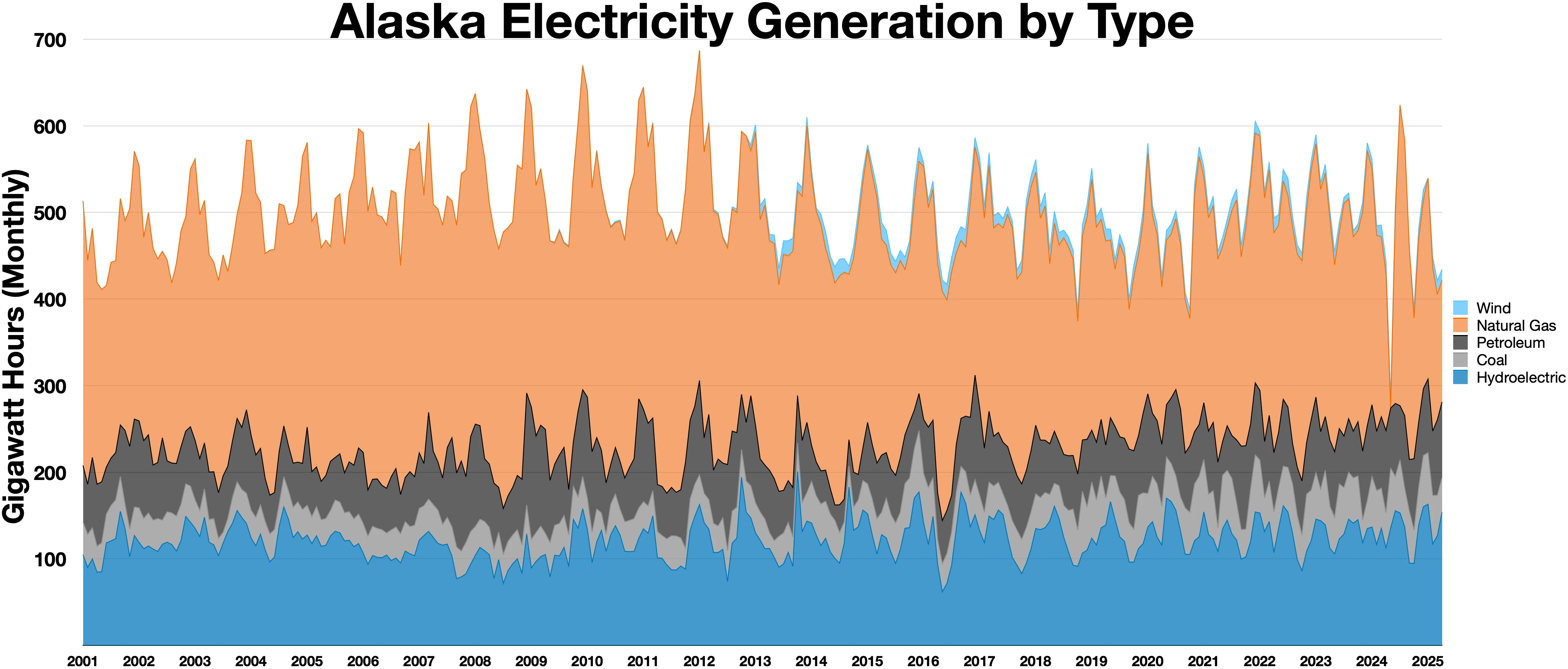
Alaska electricity generation by type

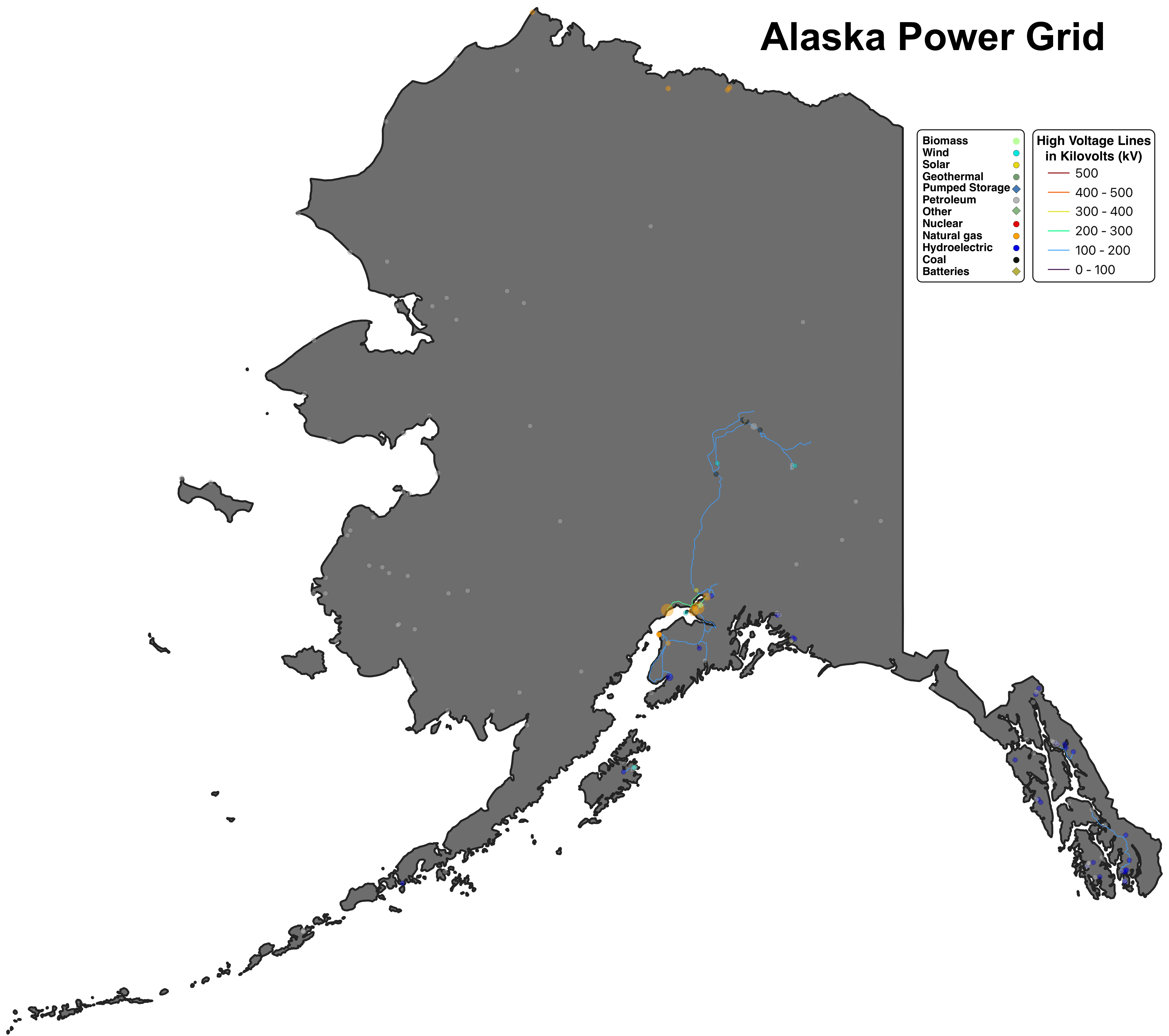
Alaska power grid

== Nuclear power stations ==
There were no utility-scale nuclear facilities in the state of Alaska in 2022. A proposed nuclear power station was the Galena Nuclear Power Plant.

== Fossil-fuel power stations ==
Data reported by U.S. Energy Information Administration

=== Coal (lignite) ===
Plant name	Location	Coordinates	Capacity (MW)^{[A]}	Technology	Year completed	Scheduled retirement	Refs
Atkinson Power Plant Addition; UA Fairbanks	Fairbanks	64°51′15″N 147°49′20″W	17	Conventional steam coal	2018-2020	TBD	
Aurora Energy LLC; Chena Power Plant	Fairbanks	64°50′52″N 147°44′06″W	25.7	Conventional steam coal	1952 (Unit; 1-4.7MW); 1952 (Unit 2-2.0MW); 1952 (Unit 3–1.3MW); 1975 (Unit 5-19MW)	TBD (Unit 1); TBD (Unit 2); 2009 (Unit 3); TBD (Unit 5)	
Ben J. Atkinson Power Plant; University of Alaska Fairbanks	Fairbanks	64°51′15″N 147°49′20″W	9.1	Conventional steam coal	1964 (Unit 1–0.5MW); 1964 (Unit 2–0.5MW); 1981 (Unit 3–8.1MW)	2020 (Unit 1); 2020 (Unit 2); TBD (Unit 3)	
Central Heat & Power Plant; Eielson Air Force Base	Fairbanks North Star	64°40′17″N 147°04′34″W	20	Conventional steam coal	1952 (Unit 1–0.5MW); 1952 (Unit 2–0.5MW); 1955 (Unit 3–5.0MW); 1969 (Unit 4–5.0MW); 1987 (Unit 5–9.0MW)	TBD (Unit 1); TBD (Unit 2); TBD (Unit 3); TBD (Unit 4); TBD (Unit 5)	
Clear Air Force Station Power Plant	Yukon-Koyukuk	64°17′26″N 149°11′13″W	22.5	Conventional steam coal	1960 (Unit 1–7.5MW); 1960 (Unit 2–7.5MW); 1960 (Unit 3–7.5MW)	2016	
Healy Power Plant	Healy	63°51′15″N 148°57′00″W	75	Conventional steam coal	1967 (Unit 1-25MW); 1998 (Unit 2-50MW)	TBD (Unit 1); TBD (Unit 2)	
(Fort Wainwright) Power Plant	Fairbanks	64°49′32″N 147°38′55″W	22.1	Conventional steam coal	1945 (Unit 1–3.5MW); 1955 (Unit 2–6.2MW); 1955 (Unit 3–6.2MW); 1955 (Unit 4–6.2MW); 1989 (Unit 5–6.2MW)	TBD (Unit 1); IDLE (Unit 2); TBD (Unit 3); TBD (Unit 4); TBD (Unit 5)	

^{A} Multi-fuel plant, listed is "total net summer capacity" by source.

=== Petroleum ===
Plant name	Location	Coordinates	Capacity (MW)	Technology	Year completed	Refs
Alakanuk	Wade Hampton	62°41′00″N 164°39′16″W	0.8	Reciprocating engine	2013	
Ambler	Ambler	67°05′17″N 157°51′24″W	1.1	Reciprocating engine (x3)	1990-1998	
Anchorage 1	Anchorage	61°13′20″N 149°51′58″W	2.0	Reciprocating engine	1972/2007	
Angoon	Skagway	57°29′57″N 134°35′10″W	1.5	Reciprocating engine (x3)	1990-2009	
Aniak	Bethel	61°34′51″N 159°32′08″W	1.7	Reciprocating engine (x3)	1988-2016	
Auke Bay	Juneau	58°23′15″N 134°38′41″W	33.7	Simple cycle (x2)	1993/1994	
Bethel	Bethel	60°47′23″N 161°47′16″W	12.6	Reciprocating engine (x6)	1976-1992	
Brevig Mission	Brevig Mission	65°19′54″N 166°28′46″W	1.0	Reciprocating engine (x3)	2010/2018	
Centennial	Ketchikan	55°07′17″N 131°33′37″W	3.3	Reciprocating engine	1987	
Central Heat & Power Plant (Eielson Air Force Base)	Fairbanks North Star	64°40′17″N 147°04′34″W	6.0	Reciprocating engine (x4)	2015	
Chevak	Chevak	61°31′31″N 165°35′25″W	1.8	Reciprocating engine (x3)	2009	
Craig	Ketchikan	55°28′37″N 133°08′55″W	4.6	Reciprocating engine (x4)	1983-2015	
Delta Power	Delta Junction	64°01′41″N 145°43′10″W	23.1	Simple cycle	1976	
Dillingham	Dillingham	59°02′34″N 158°28′07″W	11	Reciprocating engine (x9)	1988-2019	
Dutch Harbor	Dutch Harbor	53°53′33″N 166°32′18″W	21.9	Reciprocating engine (x7)	1989-2015	
Elim	Elim	64°37′00″N 162°15′49″W	1.1	Reciprocating engine (x3)	2003-2019	
Emmonak	Emmonak	62°46′40″N 164°31′53″W	1.1	Reciprocating engine (x4)	1995-2016	
Fairbanks	Fairbanks	64°51′15″N 147°43′10″W	42.2	Reciprocating engine (x2), simple cycle (x2)	1970 (5.4MW); 1971/1972 (36.8MW)	
False Island	Ketchikan	55°29′21″N 133°08′04″W	1.3	Reciprocating engine	2003	
Fort Greely Power Plant	Delta Junction	63°58′25″N 145°43′00″W	7.4	Reciprocating engine (x4)	1959/2010	
Galena Electric Utility	Galena	64°44′39″N 156°52′25″W	3.9	Reciprocating engine (x5)	1999-2015	
Gambell	Gambell	63°46′38″N 171°42′45″W	1.6	Reciprocating engine (x3)	2006	
Glennallen	Glennallen	62°06′37″N 145°31′57″W	10.7	Reciprocating engine (x4)	1976-2010	
Gold Creek	Juneau	58°18′39″N 134°25′03″W	10.7	Reciprocating engine (x5)	1952-1966	
Gwitchyaa Zhee	Fort Yukon	66°33′59″N 145°15′11″W	2.8	Reciprocating engine (x4)	2015-2016	
Haines	Haines	59°14′09″N 135°26′46″W	8.1	Reciprocating engine (x5)	1968-2006	
Healy	Healy	63°51′15″N 148°57′00″W	2.8	Reciprocating engine	1967	
Hoonah	Skagway	58°06′23″N 135°25′51″W	2.0	Reciprocating engine (x3)	1997/2012	
Hooper Bay	Hooper Bay	61°31′51″N 166°06′07″W	2.2	Reciprocating engine (x4)	1997-2018	
Hydaburg	Ketchikan	55°12′18″N 132°49′17″W	1.0	Reciprocating engine (x3)	1985-2001	
Industrial Plant	Juneau	58°22′03″N 134°36′29″W	41.7	Simple cycle	2016	
Jarvis Street	Sitka	59°14′09″N 135°26′46″W	25.6	Reciprocating engine (x5)	1979-2014	
Kake	Wrangell	59°14′09″N 135°26′46″W	3.1	Reciprocating engine (x5)	1993/2017	
Kasigluk	Kasigluk	60°52′23″N 162°31′11″W	2.0	Reciprocating engine (x3)	2004-2017	
Kiana	Kiana	66°58′26″N 160°25′43″W	1.2	Reciprocating engine (x3)	1984-2019	
King Cove	King Cove	55°03′42″N 162°18′37″W	1.8	Reciprocating engine (x4)	1995	
Kivalina	Kivalina	67°43′36″N 164°32′18″W	1.1	Reciprocating engine (x4)	1977-2004	
Klawock	Ketchikan	55°33′12″N 133°05′07″W	2.5	Reciprocating engine	2017	
Kodiak Microgrid	Kodiak	57°47′24″N 152°23′49″W	18.3	Reciprocating engine (x4)	1976-2005	
Kotlik	Wade Hampton	63°01′56″N 163°33′11″W	1.4	Reciprocating engine (x4)	2007	
Kotzebue Hybrid	Kotzebue	66°50′16″N 162°33′25″W	11.8	Reciprocating engine (x6)	1987-2016	
Koyuk	Koyuk	64°55′56″N 161°10′02″W	1.1	Reciprocating engine (x3)	2005	
Lemon Creek	Juneau	58°21′13″N 134°29′43″W	25.6	Reciprocating engine (x9), simple cycle (x2)	1969-1985 (24.5MW); 1980/1983 (1.1MW)	
Marshall	Wade Hampton	61°52′42″N 162°05′06″W	1.1	Reciprocating engine (x3)	1994-2010	
McGrath	McGrath	62°57′25″N 155°35′42″W	2.2	Reciprocating engine (x4)	1988-2011	
Mountain Village	Bethel	62°05′08″N 163°43′45″W	2.3	Reciprocating engine (x4)	1984-2015	
Naknek	Naknek	58°43′49″N 157°00′26″W	16.5	Reciprocating engine (x12)	1977-2019	
New Stuyahok	New Stuyahok	59°26′54″N 157°19′32″W	1.4	Reciprocating engine (x3)	2003-2012	
Newhalen	Iliamna	59°43′32″N 154°53′40″W	0.9	Reciprocating engine (x3)	2012	
Noatak	Noatak	67°34′15″N 162°57′57″W	1.3	Reciprocating engine (x3)	2004-2015	
Noorvik	Noorvik	66°50′04″N 161°02′19″W	1.5	Reciprocating engine (x3)	1997-2017	
North Pole	North Pole	64°44′08″N 147°20′53″W	181	Simple cycle (x2), 1x1 combined cycle	1976-1977 (121MW); 2007 (60MW)	
Northway	Tok	62°57′42″N 141°56′14″W	1.1	Reciprocating engine (x3)	1997-2007	
NSB Anaktuvuk Pass	Anaktuvuk Pass	68°08′17″N 151°44′28″W	2.7	Reciprocating engine (x5)	1994/2003	
NSB Atqasuk Utility	Atqasuk	70°28′57″N 157°25′31″W	3.2	Reciprocating engine (x5)	1986/2003	
NSB Kaktovik Utility	Kaktovik	70°07′32″N 143°37′08″W	2.6	Reciprocating engine (x4)	2000	
NSB Nuiqsut Utility	Nuiqsut	70°13′14″N 150°59′37″W	4.4	Reciprocating engine (x6)	1999-2013	
NSB Point Hope Utility	Point Hope	68°20′54″N 166°44′14″W	3.1	Reciprocating engine (x4)	1995-2014	
NSB Point Lay Utility	Point Lay	69°44′25″N 163°00′21″W	2.4	Reciprocating engine (x4)	2013	
NSB Wainwright Utility	Wainwright	70°38′34″N 160°01′14″W	3.0	Reciprocating engine (x5)	1988-2001	
Nunapitchuk	Nunapitchuk	60°53′45″N 162°27′35″W	0.5	Reciprocating engine	2006	
Nymans Plant Microgrid	Kodiak	57°43′54″N 152°30′25″W	10	Reciprocating engine (x2)	1994/2000	
Orca	Cordova	60°33′21″N 145°45′11″W	10.7	Reciprocating engine (x5)	1984-2009	
Pelican	Pelican	57°57′26″N 136°13′12″W	1.0	Reciprocating engine (x3)	2008	
Petersburg	Wrangell	56°48′40″N 132°57′26″W	12.9	Reciprocating engine (x7)	1965-2012	
Pilot Station	Wade Hampton	61°56′11″N 162°52′51″W	1.3	Reciprocating engine (x3)	2002-2018	
Port Lions Microgrid	Port Lions	57°51′53″N 152°51′19″W	0.5	Reciprocating engine	2017	
Quinhagak	Quinhagak	59°44′51″N 161°54′38″W	1.2	Reciprocating engine (x3)	1996-2019	
S W Bailey	Ketchikan	55°21′27″N 131°41′49″W	25.9	Reciprocating engine (x4)	1969-1998	
Sand Point	Aleutians East	55°20′23″N 160°29′50″W	3.0	Reciprocating engine (x4)	2000/2010	
Savoonga	Savoonga	63°41′43″N 170°28′33″W	1.7	Reciprocating engine (x3)	2008/2019	
Scammon Bay	Scammon Bay	61°50′35″N 165°34′53″W	1.3	Reciprocating engine (x3)	2001-2007	
Selawik	Selawik	66°36′24″N 160°00′53″W	1.7	Reciprocating engine (x3)	2003-2014	
Seldovia	Seldovia	59°26′22″N 151°42′48″W	2.2	Reciprocating engine (x2)	2004/2017	
Seward	Seward	60°07′51″N 149°26′06″W	15.6	Reciprocating engine (x6)	1975-2010	
Shishmaref	Shishmaref	65°15′18″N 166°04′25″W	1.5	Reciprocating engine (x4)	1976-2006	
Shungnak	Shungnak	66°53′17″N 157°08′25″W	1.2	Reciprocating engine (x4)	1984-1998	
Skagway	Skagway	59°27′16″N 135°18′47″W	3.4	Reciprocating engine (x4)	1986-2009	
Slana Generating Station	Slana	62°35′34″N 143°35′20″W	1.2	Reciprocating engine (x3)	2016	
Snake River	Nome	64°30′19″N 165°25′47″W	16.6	Reciprocating engine (x5)	1991-2013	
St Marys	Pitkas Point	62°03′05″N 163°10′21″W	6.5	Reciprocating engine (x3)	1974-2006	
St Michael	Nome	63°28′39″N 162°02′18″W	0.7	Reciprocating engine	2015	
Stebbins	Nome	63°31′16″N 162°17′11″W	2.0	Reciprocating engine (x4)	2014	
Swampy Acres	Kodiak	57°46′32″N 152°28′49″W	8.4	Reciprocating engine (x3)	2002/2015	
Thorne Bay	Ketchikan	55°41′09″N 132°31′44″W	1.0	Reciprocating engine (x2)	1993/1996	
TNSG North Plant	Deadhorse	70°14′07″N 148°23′01″W	0.3	Reciprocating engine	2010	
Togiak	Togiak	59°03′35″N 160°22′49″W	2.8	Reciprocating engine (x4)	2019	
Tok	Tok	63°20′08″N 143°00′00″W	5.3	Reciprocating engine (x6)	1985-2010	
Toksook Bay	Toksook Bay	60°31′48″N 165°06′31″W	2.1	Reciprocating engine (x3)	2005/2019	
Unalakleet	Nome	63°52′36″N 160°47′25″W	2.0	Reciprocating engine (x4)	2010	
Unalaska Power Module	Unalaska	53°51′50″N 166°30′45″W	1.1	Reciprocating engine	1993	
Unisea G 2	Dutch Harbor	53°52′47″N 166°33′12″W	17.5	Reciprocating engine (x8)	1990/2012	
University of Alaska Fairbanks	Fairbanks	64°51′15″N 147°49′20″W	9.6	Reciprocating engine	2000	
Upper Kalskag	Bethel	61°31′37″N 160°20′53″W	1.1	Reciprocating engine (x3)	2004	
Valdez	Valdez	61°07′49″N 146°21′53″W	8.6	Reciprocating engine (x5)	1972-2017	
Valdez Cogen	Valdez	61°05′02″N 146°15′10″W	5.3	Simple cycle	2000	
Viking	Ketchikan	55°32′27″N 133°06′08″W	1.0	Reciprocating engine	2003	
Westward Seafoods	Dutch Harbor	53°51′31″N 166°33′10″W	6.6	Reciprocating engine (x3)	1991	
Wrangell	Wrangell	56°27′40″N 132°22′46″W	8.5	Reciprocating engine (x4)	1987-2002	
Yakutat	Yakutat	59°32′41″N 139°43′27″W	3.8	Reciprocating engine (x4)	1999-2012	

=== Natural gas ===
Plant name	Location	Coordinates	Capacity (MW)	Technology	Year completed	Refs
Agrium Kenai Nitrogen Operations	Kenai	60°40′24″N 151°22′42″W	12.5	Simple cycle (x5)	1977	
Anchorage 1	Anchorage	61°13′20″N 149°51′58″W	75.9	Simple cycle (x2)	1972/2007	
Barrow	Utqiagvik	71°17′31″N 156°46′43″W	20.3	Simple cycle (x5), reciprocating engine (x2)	1977-2001 (17.3MW); 1994 (3.0MW)	
Beluga	Beluga	61°11′10″N 151°02′08″W	312.4	Simple cycle (x6)	1968-1978	
Bernice Lake	Nikiski	60°41′37″N 151°23′15″W	76.7	Simple cycle (x3)	1971-1981	
Eklutna Generation Station	Chugiak, Anchorage	61°27′28″N 149°21′05″W	171	Reciprocating engine (x10)	2015	
George M Sullivan Generation Plant 2	Anchorage	61°13′47″N 149°43′00″W	346.9	3x1 Combined cycle, simple cycle	1979/2017 (254.3MW); 1984 (92.6MW)	
International	Anchorage	61°10′08″N 149°54′40″W	30	Simple cycle (x2)	1964-1965	
Nikiski Co-Generation	Nikiski	60°40′35″N 151°22′40″W	80.8	1x1 combined cycle	1986/2013	
NSB Nuiqsut Utility	Nuiqsut	70°13′14″N 150°59′37″W	2.2	Reciprocating engine (x3)	2008/2013	
Soldotna	Soldotna	60°29′58″N 150°59′50″W	50	Simple cycle	2014	
Southcentral Power Project	Anchorage	61°10′03″N 149°54′19″W	203.9	3x1 combined cycle	2013	
Tesoro Kenai Cogeneration Plant	Kenai	60°40′37″N 151°22′53″W	8.6	Simple cycle (x2)	1988	
TNSG North Plant	Deadhorse	70°14′07″N 148°23′01″W	25.4	Simple cycle (x4)	2008-2014	
TNSG South Plant	Deadhorse	70°12′00″N 148°28′00″W	8.1	Reciprocating engine (x6)	1992-2010	

== Renewable power stations ==
Data reported by U.S. Energy Information Administration

=== Biomass ===
Plant name	Location	Coordinates	Capacity (MW)	Fuel type	Technology	Year completed	Refs
JBER Landfill Gas Power Plant	Anchorage	61°17′10″N 149°36′36″W	11.5	Landfill gas	Reciprocating engine (x5)	2012	

=== Geothermal ===
Plant name	Location	Coordinates	Capacity (MW)	Technology	Year completed	Refs
Chena Geothermal Plant	Fairbanks North Star	65°03′11″N 146°03′20″W	0.4	ORC generator (x2)	2006	

=== Hydroelectric ===
Plant name	Location	Coordinates	Capacity (MW)	Number of turbines	Year completed	Refs
Allison Creek	Valdez	61°05′04″N 146°21′12″W	6.5	1	2016	
Annex Creek	Juneau	58°19′03″N 134°06′04″W	4.0	2	1915	
Beaver Falls	Ketchikan	55°22′47″N 131°28′13″W	5.4	3	1947/1954	
Black Bear Lake	Craig	55°28′35″N 133°08′52″W	4.5	1	1995	
Blue Lake Hydro	Sitka	57°09′06″N 135°13′47″W	15.9	3	2014	
Bradley Lake	Kenai Peninsula	59°46′43″N 150°56′25″W	126	2	1991; 2018 (upgraded)^{[A]}	
Chester Lake	Metlakatla	55°07′01″N 131°32′45″W	1.3	1	1988	
Cooper Lake	Kenai Peninsula	60°23′32″N 149°39′56″W	19.4	2	1961	
Eklutna Hydro Project	Matanuska-Susitna	61°28′31″N 149°09′00″W	44.4	2	1955	
Goat Lake Hydro	Skagway	59°32′09″N 135°12′44″W	4.0	1	1997	
Gold Creek	Juneau	58°18′39″N 134°25′03″W	1.6	3	1914/1951	
Green Lake	Sitka, Alaska	56°59′11″N 135°07′22″W	18.6	2	1982	
Humpback Creek	Valdez Cordova	60°36′46″N 145°40′46″W	1.2	3	1991	
Kasidaya Creek Hydro	Skagway	59°24′26″N 135°20′27″W	3.0	1	2008	
Ketchikan	Ketchikan	55°20′41″N 131°38′00″W	4.2	3	1938/1952/1954	
King Cove	Aleutians East	55°03′42″N 162°18′37″W	0.7	1	1995	
Lake Dorothy	Juneau	58°13′57″N 134°03′12″W	14.3	1	2009	
Newhalen (Tazimina)	Iliamna	59°53′57″N 154°41′55″W	0.8	2	1998	
Pelican	Pelican	57°57′26″N 136°13′12″W	0.6	2	1984	
Purple Lake	Metlakatla	55°05′29″N 131°32′42″W	3.9	3	1956/1962	
Salmon Creek 1	Juneau	58°19′37″N 134°27′47″W	8.5	1	1984	
Silvis	Ketchikan	55°22′53″N 131°31′04″W	2.1	1	1958	
Skagway	Skagway	59°27′16″N 135°18′47″W	1.0	4	1909/1957/ 1981/1987	
Snettisham	Juneau	58°08′29″N 133°44′13″W	78.2	3	1973/1990	
Solomon Gulch	Valdez Cordova	61°04′58″N 146°18′12″W	12.0	2	1982	
South Fork	Klawock	55°33′48″N 132°53′28″W	2.0	1	2005	
Swan Lake	Ketchikan	55°36′55″N 131°21′22″W	22.6	2	1984	
Terror Lake	Kodiak Island	57°41′10″N 152°53′42″W	33.6	3	1984/2014	
Tyee Lake Hydroelectric Facility	Wrangell	56°12′59″N 131°30′15″W	22.6	2	1983	
Whitman	Ketchikan	55°19′41″N 131°31′51″W	2.1	2	2015	

^{A} The "Battle Creek Project" increased the Bradley Lake hydro facility's production by about 10 percent.

=== Solar ===
Plant name	Location	Coordinates	Capacity (MW)	Year completed	Refs
GVEA Solar Farm	Fairbanks		0.65	2018	
Houston Solar Farm	Matanuska-Susitna	61°35′14″N 149°47′21″E	8.5	2023	
Willow Solar Farm	Matanuska-Susitna		1.2	2020	

=== Wind ===
Additional data reported by the United States Wind Turbine Database
Plant name	Location	Coordinates	Capacity (MW)	Number of turbines	Year completed	Refs
Bethel Turbine	Bethel	60°46′53″N 161°53′04″W	0.9	1	2018	
Chevak Wind	Chevak	61°31′29″N 165°36′27″W	0.4	4	2009	
Delta Wind Farm	Delta Junction	64°00′50″N 145°35′48″W	1.9	3	2008/2009/2013	
Emmonak Wind	Emmonak	62°47′01″N 164°33′37″W	0.4	4	2011	
Eva Creek Wind	Ferry	64°03′29″N 148°53′06″W	24.6	12	2013	
Fire Island Wind	Anchorage	61°07′48″N 150°14′37″W	18	11	2012	
Gambell Wind	Gambell	63°46′44″N 171°42′42″W	0.3	3	2010	
Hooper Bay Wind	Hooper Bay	61°32′09″N 166°05′48″W	0.3	3	2008	
Kasigluk Wind	Kasigluk	60°52′16″N 162°30′48″W	0.3	3	2006	
Klondike Turbine	Seward	60°07′34″N 149°25′56″W	1.5	1	2001	
Kotzebue Hybrid Wind	Kotzebue	66°50′16″N 162°33′25″W	4.5	19	1997/1999/2002/ 2005/2006/2012	
Pillar Mountain Wind	Kodiak Island	57°47′13″N 152°26′26″W	9	6	2009/2012	
Quinhagak Wind	Quinhagak	59°44′24″N 161°54′52″W	0.3	3	2010	
Sand Point Wind	Aleutians East	55°20′23″N 160°29′50″W	1	2	2011	
Savoonga Wind	Savoonga	63°41′29″N 170°29′54″W	0.2	2	2008	
Selawik Wind	Selawik	66°36′30″N 160°01′07″W	0.26	4	2004	
Shaktoolik Wind	Shaktoolik	64°21′39″N 161°12′14″W	0.2	2	2012	
Snake River Wind (Newton Peak)	Nome	64°34′00″N 165°25′53″W	2.6	17	2013/2015	
St. Mary's Turbine	Pitkas Point	62°02′05″N 163°15′03″W	0.9	1	2019	
Toksook Bay Wind	Toksook Bay	60°31′36″N 165°06′53″W	0.3	3	2006	
Tuntutuliak Wind	Tuntutuliak	60°20′15″N 162°39′46″W	0.5	5	2012	
Unakleet Wind	Nome	60°54′33″N 160°46′12″W	0.6	6	2009	

== Storage power stations ==
Data reported by U.S. Energy Information Administration

=== Battery ===
Plant name	Location	Coordinates	Discharge capacity (MW)	Technology	Year completed	Refs
Battery Energy Storage System	Fairbanks North Star	64°49′00″N 147°43′30″W	40	Batteries	2003	
ESS Battery Microgrid	Kodiak Island	57°47′57″N 152°24′15″W	3.0	Batteries	2012	
Eyak Service Center BESS	Valdez Cordova	60°32′26″N 145°44′27″W	1.0	Batteries	2019	
Kotzebue Hybrid	Kotzebue	66°50′16″N 162°33′25″W	1.2	Batteries	2015	
	Soldotna		93	Batteries	2022	

=== Flywheel ===
Plant name	Location	Coordinates	Discharge capacity (MW)	Technology	Year completed	Refs
Flywheel Energy Storage System Microgrid	Kodiak Island	57°46′48″N 152°26′38″W	2.0	Flywheels	2015	

== See also ==
- List of power stations in the United States
