= Snettisham, Juneau =

Coordinates: 57°59′03″N 133°47′17″W

Snettisham is a locale and former populated place in the City and Borough of Juneau, Alaska, United States. Based on the mainland coast of Stephens Passage, it is 31 miles (50 km) southeast of the city of Juneau. The area was named by George Vancouver in 1794; the bay on which Snettisham was located (Port Snettisham) was named for the village of Snettisham in Norfolk, England (Vancouver was born in Norfolk). It was established as a gold- and silver-mining camp around 1895, its operations being linked to those in the immediate Juneau area, and it remained a small harbor village until 1926. The United States Department of the Treasury designated Snettisham as one of several of Alaska's "special" landing places for vessels carrying "coal, salt, railroad iron, and other like items in bulk". The designation was meant to encourage the construction of facilities to accommodate these shipments, thus stimulating creation and growth of local businesses.

Businesses in Snettisham included the Alaska-Snettisham Gold Mining Company, the Daisey Bell Mine, the Crystal Gold Mining Company, the Pacific Packing and Navigation Company, and a salmon cannery for the Taku Fishing Company (headquartered in Portland, Oregon). Snettisham produced the first paper pulp to be shipped out of Alaska in 1917.

Snettisham had a post office from June 1900 to 1912. It was an intermediary office on a route from Juneau to Sumdum and received mail once a week. The route had expanded to Kake after 1902 but by 1905.

== Alaska-Snettisham Gold Mining Company ==
The Alaska-Snettisham Gold Mining Company appears to have been the most significant business in the area. It was led by President and General Manager John N. Tisdale of Simcoe, Ontario, Canada, and Superintendent Wythe Denby. Also active in Alaska politics, Tidale joined the American Institute of Mining Engineers in 1903, Denby having been elected as a member in 1895. Tisdale was also Snettisham's postmaster for a time.

The company began operations in 1899 and was incorporated on May 31, 1901,. Led by it operated two mines, the Friday and the Crystal. The company developed the Friday mine in 1899, eventually building two tunnels, 750 feet (229 m) and 600 feet (183 m) long. Operations at Friday ceased in 1904; the ore, containing pyrite and magnetite, made extraction of gold difficult.

The Crystal quartz ledge, located just 1.5 miles (2.4 km) from the Snettisham wharf (constructed under Tisdale's direction), was discovered in 1895 and independently mined from 1901 to 1903, when the company purchased it. Even before the purchase, the Crystal Mine had produced $25,000USD worth of gold. The mine displayed "perfectly terminated" prisms of quartz, large cubes of pyrite, and crystallized octahedra of gold. By 1902, the company's capital stock was worth $892,820.

The company discontinued all operations in early 1905. That November, Tisdale drowned in the Harlem River in New York City. The company's charter, established in New Jersey, became void in 1907 from nonpayment of taxes dating back to 1904.

== See also ==
- Snettisham Airport
- Snettisham Hydroelectric Project
