= Snettisham Airport =

- IATA: none; ICAO: none; FAA LID: 7AK2

Summary
- Airport type: Private
- Owner: Alaska Electric Light & Power
- Location: Snettisham, Alaska
- Elevation AMSL: 14 ft / 4 m
- Coordinates: 58°08′03.825″N 133°43′46.25″W

Map

Runways
Direction	Length		Surface
Direction	m	ft	Surface
04W/22W	914	3,000	Water
15/33	762	2,500	Gravel
- Sources: FAA

Snettisham Airport is a publicly owned, private-use aircraft facility near the Snettisham Hydroelectric Project in Snettisham, Alaska. It is managed by Alaska Electric Light & Power.
