= Alaska-Gastineau Mine =

American former gold mine

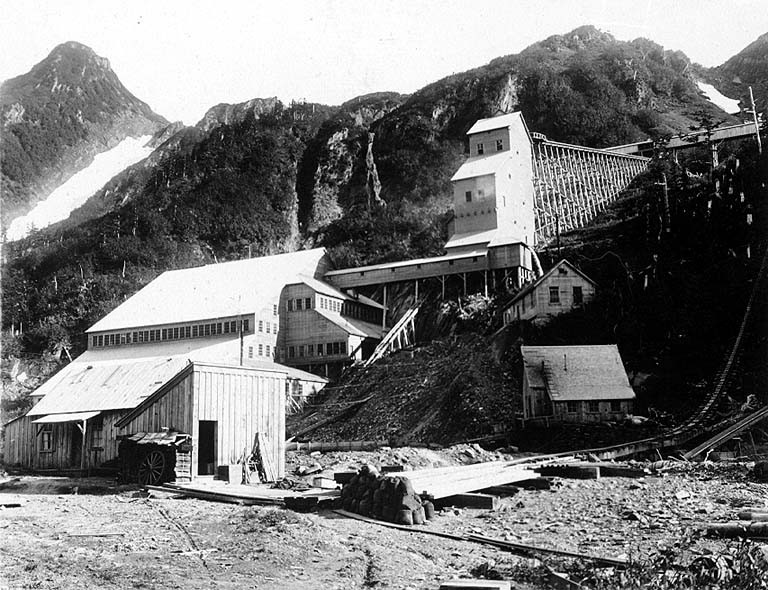
- Alaska Perseverance Co. mine and buildings at Silverbow Basin, August 1910

- Location within Alaska

Location
- Location: United States; 58°18′45″N 134°20′45″W

Production
- Products: gold

The Alaska-Gastineau Mine (alternate: Perseverance Mine) was a gold mine in Perseverance, about 4 miles (6.4 km) east of Juneau, Alaska, USA. It was briefly the largest gold mine in the world. The mine was operated by the Alaska-Gastineau Mining Company.

== Geography ==
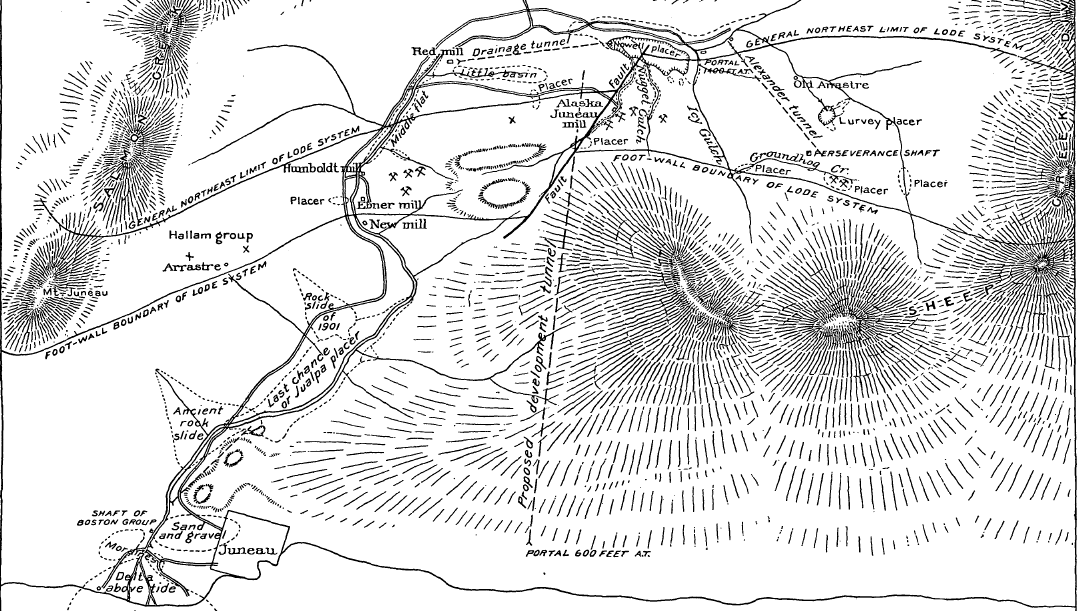
Map of the Gold Creek area showing the location of the Perseverance shaft (top right)

The Alaska-Gastineau Mine was located within the Silver Bow Basin. Its concentrating plant was situated near Thane. The mine had a 2 miles (3.2 km) shaft running through Mount Roberts that reached the Perseverance Mine near Gold Creek. It adjoined the Alaska-Juneau Mine. The mine's low-grade ore is situated on a mountain above the Gastineau Channel. Its ore body covered approximately 2,000 acres (810 ha), more than 2 miles (3.2 km) in length, with 20 miles (32 km) of tunnels and crosscuts. According to Jackling, the block of ore had at least 100,000,000 tons above sea level. The property consisted of a group of claims whose lode system covered 11,000 feet (3,400 m). It was operated on a 6,000-ton daily capacity.

== History ==
The mine's large scale development began in 1912. In 1913, while it was under construction, Emile Gastonguay was hired as the mine's chief electrician by managing director, Daniel C. Jackling. Bartlett L. Thane was the manager. Becoming unprofitable, it was shut down in 1921.

== Features ==
For a period of time preceding World War I, the Alaska-Gastineau Mine was the largest gold mine in the world. Its mills were said to be the largest and most modern gold-crushing plant in the world. For its time, the ore was handled more economically than in any other Northwest mine. "The mill avoided chemical processing with cyanide (cyanidation) or mercury amalgamation circuits by smelting all the concentrate."
