= University of Alaska Fairbanks Combined Heat and Power Plant =

Coal-fired cogeneration plant in Alaska

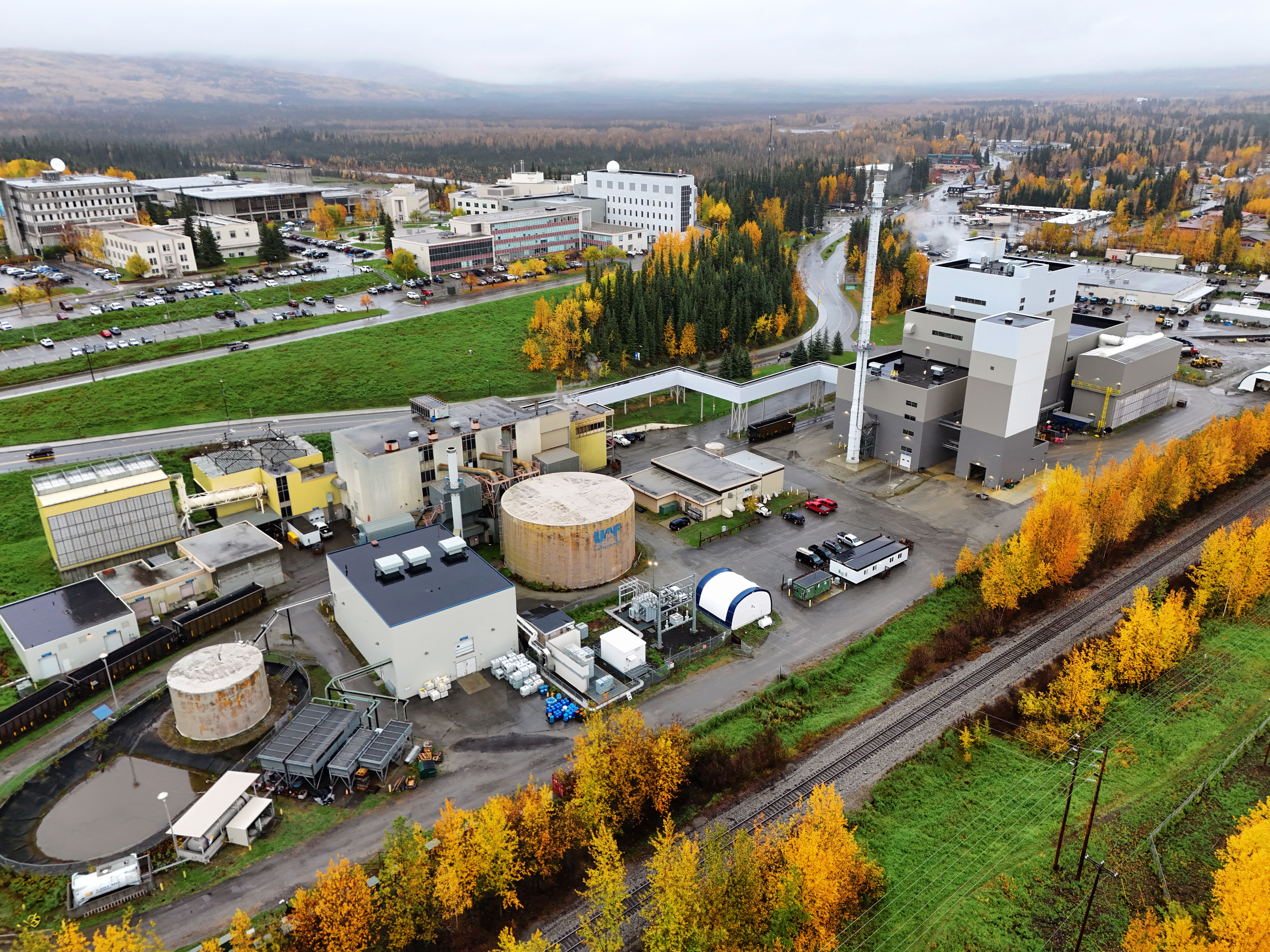
- The older Ben J. Atkinson Power Plant (left) and the Combined Heat and Power Plant (right) in 2024
- Country: United States
- Location: University of Alaska Fairbanks, College, Alaska, Fairbanks North Star Borough
- Coordinates: 64.85392°N 147.81925°W
- Status: Operational
- Construction began: 2015
- Commission date: February 2020
- Owner: University of Alaska Fairbanks
- Operator: University of Alaska Fairbanks

Thermal power station
- Primary fuel: Sub-bituminous coal
- Turbine technology: Steam turbine
- Cogeneration?: Yes

Power generation
- Nameplate capacity: 17 MW

The University of Alaska Fairbanks Combined Heat and Power Plant is a coal-fired cogeneration plant at the University of Alaska Fairbanks (UAF) in College, Alaska, near Fairbanks. The plant provides electricity and steam heat to the university's main campus and has a generating capacity of 17 megawatts (MW). It is the newest coal-fired power plant in the United States.

== History ==
The plant replaced the coal-fired boilers at the adjacent Ben J. Atkinson Power Plant, which had supplied the campus with heat and electricity since 1964. Concerns about the aging plant increased after a boiler failure in December 1998 caused a prolonged loss of heat and power. UAF subsequently examined at least 14 fuel and energy alternatives before selecting a new coal-fired plant.

Coal was retained in part because of the availability of locally mined sub-bituminous coal from the Usibelli Coal Mine near Healy, about 100 miles (160 km) south of the campus. Fairbanks lacked a natural-gas pipeline, and university officials estimated that imported liquefied natural gas would cost at least four times as much as locally mined coal.

A groundbreaking ceremony was held in August 2014, and construction began the following year. Construction was completed in 2018, followed by an extended commissioning period. The plant began supplying all heat and electricity to the campus in February 2020. The project ultimately cost approximately $255 million.

== Design ==
The plant uses a circulating fluidized bed boiler capable of producing 240,000 lb/h (30 kg/s) of steam and designed to burn Alaskan coal with the ability to co-fire up to 15 percent biomass. Air-pollution controls include limestone and dry-sorbent injection, a multiclone dust collector and a pulse-jet fabric filter.

== See also ==
- Healy Clean Coal Project
- List of power stations in Alaska
