= List of shipwrecks in January 1923 =

The list of shipwrecks in January 1923 includes ships sunk, foundered, grounded, or otherwise lost during January 1923.

== 3 January ==
List of shipwrecks: 3 January 1923
Ship	State	Description
Alice M. Colburn	United States	The 225-foot (69 m), 1,603-gross register ton four-masted schooner ran aground on Great Egg Rock off Manchester, Massachusetts, during a storm, broke up, and sank in up to 30 feet (9.1 m) of water just off the northwest side of the rock.
Four Brothers	United Kingdom	The schooner foundered in the Irish Sea off Rhyl, Denbighshire, Wales, with the loss of two lives.

== 4 January ==
List of shipwrecks: 4 January 1923
Ship	State	Description
Anita Phillips	United States	After her gasoline engine broke down and her two anchors dragged, the 21-gross register ton motor vessel ran aground and sank in 210 feet (64 m) of water in Port Snettisham off Stephens Passage in the Alexander Archipelago in Southeast Alaska. The mail boat George Jr. (United States) rescued all four people – two passengers and two crew members – on board.
The Victory	United Kingdom	The coaster ran aground at Youghal, County Cork. She was refloated and beached on 6 January but sank in the early hours of 7 January.

== 5 January ==
List of shipwrecks: 5 January 1923
Ship	State	Description
Fundus	Germany	The cargo ship sank at Hamburg.

== 6 January ==
List of shipwrecks: 6 January 1923
Ship	State	Description
Perrosien	France	The topsail schooner came ashore at Bucks Mills, Devon and was wrecked.

== 12 January ==
List of shipwrecks: 12 January 1923
Ship	State	Description
President	United States	While laid up for the winter at Graveyard Point (58°52′N 157°01′W) on the Bristol Bay coast of the Territory of Alaska, the 50-gross register ton, 72.2-foot (22.0 m) fishing vessel was wrecked in a storm.
West Calumb	United States	The cargo ship collided with Western Plains (United States) at New York and sank. She was refloated on 16 January.

== 15 January ==
List of shipwrecks: 15 January 1923
Ship	State	Description
Carmen	Sweden	The four masted auxiliary schooner ran aground on the Isle of May, Fife, United Kingdom. All sixteen crew were rescued.
Cobden	United Kingdom	The schooner collided with the trawler Stronsay (United Kingdom) in the River Humber and sank. Her crew were rescued.
Dorothy	United Kingdom	The cargo ship came ashore 10 nautical miles (19 km) from Puerto Plata, Dominican Republic and was wrecked.
Patrick Henry	United States	The cargo ship ran aground on Sibay Island, Philippines. She was refloated but was leaking and was beached. Patrick Henry was refloated on 18 January.
Sacramento	Sweden	The schooner capsized in the Baltic Sea south east of Ystad, Skåne County. She was discovered derelict and towed into Saßnitz, Mecklenburg, Germany.

== 16 January ==
List of shipwrecks: 16 January 1923
Ship	State	Description
Aleppo	Germany	The cargo ship collided with Uganglianza (Italy) at Antwerp, Belgium and sank.
Belle	United Kingdom	The tug was in collision with Trewidden (United Kingdom) off Cardiff, Glamorgan and sank with the loss of two crew members.
Germania	United Kingdom	The cargo ship struck rocks off Cape Malea, Greece and was wrecked. Her crew were rescued.
Heimat	Germany	The cargo ship sank at Sandhamn, Stockholm, Sweden with the loss of all hands.
Louise M. Richards	United States	The schooner was driven ashore at Bluefields, Nicaragua and was wrecked.
Nal	Danzig	The barque sank off the Wollaston Islands, Chile. Her crew were rescued.
Salvador	Spain	The cargo ship was wrecked near Bonanza, Andalusia. Her crew were rescued.

== 17 January ==
List of shipwrecks: 17 January 1923
Ship	State	Description
Montello	Italy	The cargo ship was abandoned in the Atlantic Ocean.

== 19 January ==
List of shipwrecks: 19 January 1923
Ship	State	Description
Maligin	Soviet Navy	The icebreaker foundered in the Baltic Sea off the coast of Sweden. She was carrying a consignment of 200,000 German rifles which had been transshipped at sea a few days prior.
Nuestra Señora del Carmen	Spain	The sailing ship was wrecked at Cape San Lorenzo with the loss of two of her six crew.
Racconigi	Italy	The cargo ship caught fire in the Mediterranean Sea and was beached 30 nautical miles (56 km) east of Algiers, Algeria.
Speranza	Italy	The cargo ship collided with Cuidad de Montevideo (Uruguay) at Buenos Aires, Argentina and sank. Her crew were rescued.

== 20 January ==
List of shipwrecks: 20 January 1923
Ship	State	Description
Yanagawa Maru	Japan	The cargo ship ran aground in the Hirado Strait. Her crew were rescued.

== 21 January ==
List of shipwrecks: 21 January 1923
Ship	State	Description
Albert	United Kingdom	The tug struck the wreck of a coal grab at Liverpool, Lancashire and sank with the loss of three of her seven crew.
Farmand	Norway	The cargo ship foundered in the Skaggerak with the loss of seven of her nine crew.
Nautilus	United Kingdom	The cargo liner collided with Australia (United Kingdom) in the Scheldt at Antwerp, Belgium and sank with the loss of three of the eighteen people on board.
Wilbo	Germany	The cargo ship foundered off Elbmündung with the loss of seven of her seventeen crew.

== 22 January ==
List of shipwrecks: 22 January 1923
Ship	State	Description
Lillian	United Kingdom	The tug sank at Erith, Kent.

== 23 January ==
List of shipwrecks: 23 January 1923
Ship	State	Description
"Beukelsdijk"	Netherlands	The 10,700-ton cargo ship was wrecked near Bodo.

== 24 January ==
List of shipwrecks: 24 January 1923
Ship	State	Description
Flora	United States	The 22-gross register ton motor vessel was wrecked without loss of life during a snowstorm at Duck Island (54°59′00″N 131°14′30″W) in Southeast Alaska, becoming a total loss. The motor vessel Hideveld (United States) rescued her crew.
Moween	Canada	The schooner was abandoned and set afire in the Atlantic Ocean (approximately 27°N 72°W). Her crew were rescued by Nord-Schleswig (Germany).

== 26 January ==
List of shipwrecks: 26 January 1923
Ship	State	Description
Clintonia	United Kingdom	The schooner caught fire in the Atlantic Ocean and was abandoned (42°30′N 58°00′W). Her crew were rescued by Empress of Scotland (United Kingdom).
Maid of England	United Kingdom	The barquentine was dismasted in the Atlantic Ocean off Halifax, Nova Scotia Canada. She was abandoned by her crew, who were rescued by Manchester Shipper (United Kingdom). Maid of England was towed into Halifax by Manchester Shipper.

== 29 January ==
List of shipwrecks: 29 January 1923
Ship	State	Description
Beukelsdijk	Netherlands	The cargo ship was wrecked at Bodø, Norway.

== 30 January ==
List of shipwrecks: 30 January 1923
Ship	State	Description
Mar del Plata	Spain	The cargo ship departed the River Clyde, United Kingdom for Bilbao. Presumed later foundered in the Irish Sea with the loss of all hands. A lifeboat from the ship was discovered off Ramsey, Isle of Man on 2 February.

== 31 January ==
List of shipwrecks: 31 January 1923
Ship	State	Description
Martha	United Kingdom	The three-masted schooner built 1903, sank in Swansea Bay. Her crew were rescued by Singleton (United Kingdom).
