= Alaska-Gastineau Mining Company =

American gold mine corporation

- Company type: Private
- Industry: Gold mining
- Founded: 1911; 115 years ago
- Defunct: 1934; 92 years ago
- Headquarters: New York City, New York, United States
- Area served: Alaska
- Key people: Charles Hayden, President
- Products: Gold ore
- Owner: Alaska Gold Mines Co.
- Number of employees: 900

The Alaska-Gastineau Mining Co. had its offices in 25 Broad St., New York City, New York. It was the operating company for the Alaska Gold Mines Co. in Alaska. It worked the Alaska-Gastineau Mine/Perseverance Mine in the Silver Bow Basin, approximately 4 miles (6.4 km) from Juneau and processed its ore at an old remodeled mill and crushing plant at Sheep Creek. The property of the Alaska Juneau Gold Mining Co. adjoined the Alaska Gastineau on the west.

== History ==
Around 1900, Joseph Gilbert bought the Perseverance claims and, with the assistance of Col. W. J. Sutherland, formed the Alaska Perseverance Mining Co. Their mill began operations in 1907. In 1910, the Alaska Perseverance Mining Co. was reorganized under the name of the Alaska-Gastineau Mining Co. The company incorporated in New York in 1911. In 1912, the Alaska Gold Mines Co. was organized as a holding company to finance the Alaska-Gastineau Mining Co., and large scale development of the mine commenced in July, 1912.

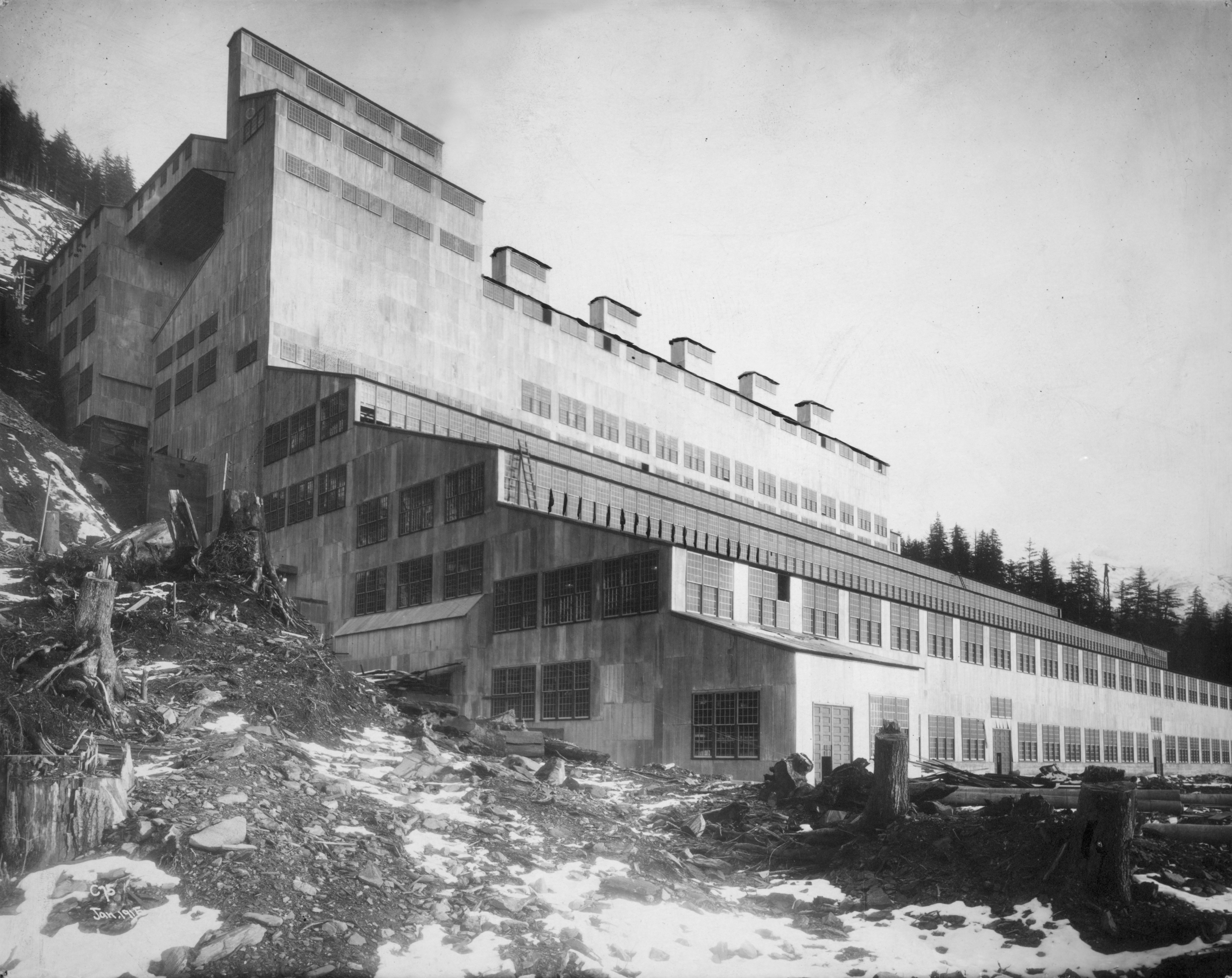
Alaska Gastineau gold crushing mill

The mill was constructed in Thane. It was designed by George Bradley, who also designed the Utah Copper Company mill. Robert Semple began excavating for the foundations in November, 1913. Construction was under the supervision of Daniel C. Jackling, the original company's managing director. After 1910, Bartlett L. Thane, the mining engineer who pioneered hydroelectric power in Juneau, Alaska, became managing director. Charles E. Bruff was superintendent of machinery installation, while Charles Hayden was the company President.

The average number of employees during 1913 was 900. It was announced on Nov. 21, 1914, that the first section of the company's reduction works would be in operation after January 1, 1915. The first unit started up on February 18, 1915. By June 30, 1915, 4000 tons of ore were being crushed daily. The Alaska Juneau Mining Company purchased all of the Alaska-Gastineau Mining Co. properties and assets in 1934.

== Holdings ==
By 1915, the company's properties included a net area of 2,166 acres, consisting of 1,672 acres of lodes, 219 acres of placers and 275 acres of millsites and homesteads. The mining claims consisted primarily of four groups, formerly owned and operated independently of each other, locally known as the "Alaska Perseverance," "Ground Hog," "Silver Bow Basin," and "Sheep Creek" groups. They covered a lode system in excess of 2 miles. The company also owned the 310-acre mill site on the Gastineau Channel. In addition, the company owned and controlled lands, reservoir sites, power plant sites and rights-of-way on Salmon Creek, emptying into Gastineau Channel; also on Annex Creek and Carlson Creek, emptying into the Taku Inlet; and on Granite Creek, Gold Creek and Lurvey Creek.

== Operations ==
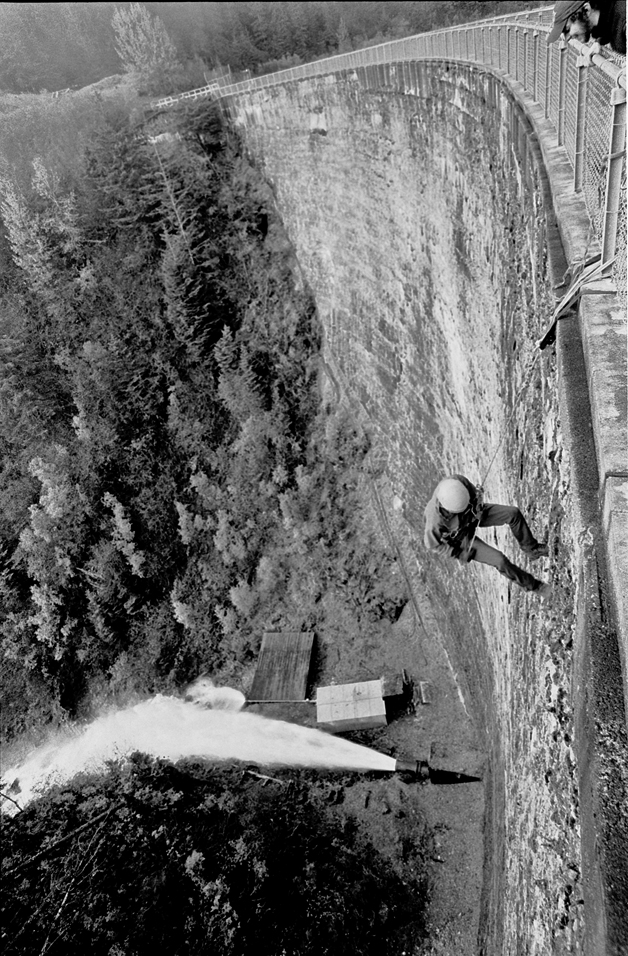
Salmon Creek Dam

With the exception of the coarse-crushing plant, the four sections of the mill were housed in one large building. The mill was built of concrete and structural steel. The coarse-crushing plant was situated on the mountainside at the terminus of the railroad at an altitude of 125 feet (38 m) above sea level. The fine-crushing plant was housed in the same building as the concentrating mill. The lowest floor of the concentrating mills was 192 feet (59 m) above sea level, affording ample grade for the disposal of the tailing, which was carried into the Gastineau Channel.

About 6,000 horsepower of electricity was required to operate the mines and mills. The big Salmon Creek power stations, owned by the company and erected at the same time as the mine and mill development, furnished the power. There were two stations, one at sea level near the mouth of the stream, and the other at the upper end of the first basin at an altitude of 350 feet (110 m) immediately below the falls. A concrete dam held in storage 19,000 acre-feet (23,000,000 m^{3}) of water as reserve to keep the Pelton wheels moving during the winter months.

The Post office was situated in the company's general store. A school was established in a building provided by the company. Private businesses were conducted nearby by consent of the company, including a steam laundry. Liquor was not sold on the premises, but it could be obtained in Douglas or Juneau.

== Major projects ==
While under Thane's management, the company conceived of and constructed the Salmon Creek Dam and hydroelectric facilities (completed in 1912), and also the Annex Creek plant (completed in 1916), both designed by Harry L. Wallenberg, chief engineer. Salmon Creek Dam, the first thin arch dam ever constructed, was built by Thane with the assistance of some of his former football teammates.

== Archives ==
- Alaska Gastineau Mining Company Annual Reports. 1916–1920. 0.58 cubic feet.
- Edwin Gardner Ames Papers. 1856–1931. Approximately 70 cubic feet. At the Labor Archives of Washington, University of Washington Libraries Special Collections.
- Asahel Curtis photographs. 1874–1941. 5.46 cubic feet (13 boxes), 1,678 photographic prints.
