= Bartlett L. Thane =

American mining engineer (1877–1927)

Bartlett Lee "Bart" Thane (August 26, 1877 – November 7, 1927) was an American mining engineer who pioneered hydroelectric power in Juneau, Alaska. The world's first thin arch dam, Salmon Creek Dam, was constructed by Thane.

== Early years ==
Thane was born in Oakland, California, USA, in August 1877. His parents were Joseph E. Thane and Laura E. Thane. His father was a well-known orchardist from Niles, California. His maternal grandfather was Judge Harmon J. Tilden. Thane's sister was named Laura. He attended the University of California, Berkeley, where he graduated with a degree in mining engineering in 1899. While attending the university, he played college football and was the quarterback of the 1898 California Golden Bears football team that defeated Stanford in the "Big Game" for the first time by a score of 22 to 0. He was also a member of Skull and Keys and Kappa Alpha Order at Cal.

== Career ==
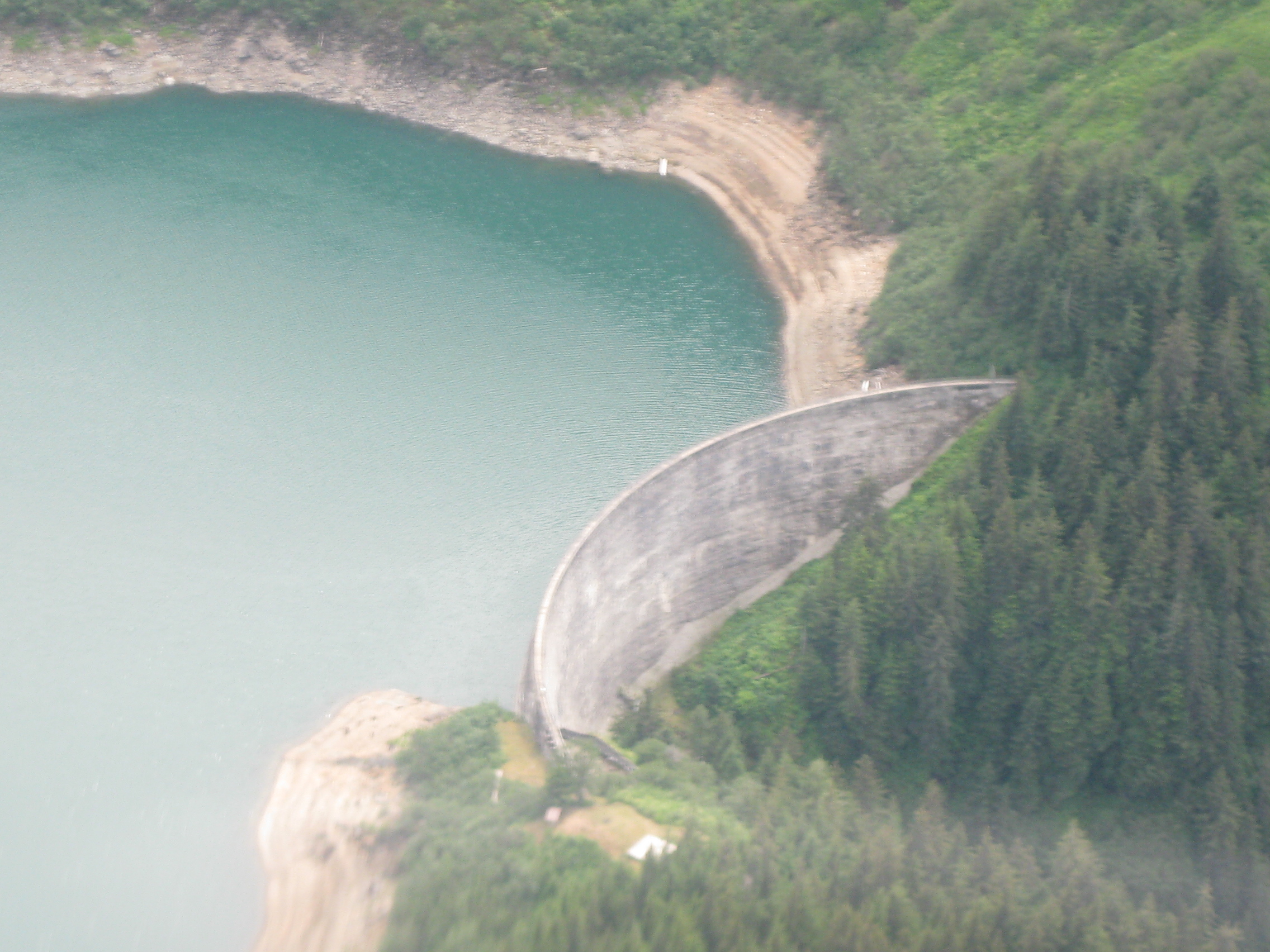
Salmon Creek Dam, Alaska

Thane first came to Alaska in 1897. He was hired by Herman T. Tripp to work at the Sumdum Chief Mine south of Juneau. He was the first superintendent of the Eagle River Mining Company (1903-1910), before becoming Managing Director of the Alaska-Gastineau Mining Company. By 1911, he had controlling interest in six Juneau area gold mines. In 1912, he took control of the Perseverance Mine and developed it into the world's largest. With the assistance of his former college football friends, Thane constructed Salmon Creek Dam, the world's first thin arch dam, in 1914.

In 1915, Thane and other mining and business executives established Juneau's first golf course, in the Mendenhall Valley. Between 1918 and 1919, Thane quit the Alaska-Gastineau Mining Company, moved to San Francisco, and then returned to the Alaska-Gastineau Mining Company. In 1921, after the Alaska-Gastineau Mine shut down, Thane attempted to develop his facilities for a new pulp mill, but a deal with Japanese investors failed in 1923.

== Personal life ==
In June 1902, Thane married Juliet Fay Blaine (born March 27, 1879) at Berkeley, California. They lived in what was to become the Wickersham State Historic Site on Chicken Ridge in Juneau during the period of 1914-1916, along with their daughter, also named Juliet Fay Thane (born August 2, 1906 in Juneau). Thane's sister Laura married James R. Whipple who became a business associate of Thane's.

In a Draft Registration Card completed in September 1918, Thane listed his permanent address as the Fairmont Hotel in San Francisco. He identified himself as a mining engineer with an office at San Francisco's Crocker Building. Also, in a 1923 passport application submitted of a trip to Japan, Korea, China and Australia, Thane listed San Francisco as his permanent residence. Thane died in New York City in 1927. Thane, Alaska, and Thane Road, on the Gastineau Channel, were named in his honor.
