= Crystal Mine =

Mine near Juneau, Alaska, USA

- Location in Alaska

Location
- Location: Juneau City and Borough, Alaska, United States; 57°58′12.36″N 133°47′37.03″W

Production
- Products: Gold from quartz veins in ore minerals of Chalcopyrite and pyrite

History
- Opened: 1901
- Closed: 1925

Crystal Mine is located near Juneau in the U.S. state of Alaska. The quartz ledge at the Crystal Mine was first discovered in 1895 by B. Heins. It was so named because of the large pyrite cubes which were found occurring in the surface outcrops of the ledge. Gold was extracted till 1905 from quartz using ten-stamp mill and from about 1,000 feet of underground workings yielded 1,210 ounces of gold. Intermittent production of gold is reported till 1925 but there are no records of the yield. The formation was determined as of 54 to 56 Ma age. The gold yielding resources available from the mine were assessed as 9,000 tons of material with yield of 0.21 ounce of gold per ton.

== Geography ==
On the sides of many of the pyrite cubes, small particles and crystals of gold may be observed, and this somewhat novel occurrence makes the ore of special mineralogic interest. The mine workings were situated 1.5 miles (2.4 km) from the wharf at Snettisham and 700 feet (210 m) above high tide water. The ledge has a width of from 1–10 feet (0.30–3.05 m), averaging about 4 feet (1.2 m), and is exposed for over 1,000 feet (300 m) in length. Fragments of the enclosing andesite are often included in the vein, and these as well as the quartz carry the gold values.

== Geology ==
The gold deposits were discovered in quartz veins (in undulating form) in a low-angle fault with a strike of S30-50E and dipping 8-35E; the fault itself was identified as 1–10 feet (0.30–3.05 m) in thickness in rock formations of amphibolite as part of the Snettisham ultramafic complex. Sheared and altered amphibolite were the dominant formations in the fault where quartz were not found; the fault zone also had large fillings of weathered calcite orange in colour, with quartz formation located in a limited thickness of few inches to 10 feet (3.0 m). The composition of quarts varied with 60 percent silicified amphibolite to 100 % of quartzite. The veins were also filled with gauges. Quartz and calcite crystals up to 6 inches (150 mm) long were common and pyrites covered with euhedral gold crystals were found in 60% of the veins. A remarkable sample of a cubic pyrite crystal from the Crystal Mine, which measures about 3 inches (76 mm) on a side with large amount of terminated crystals of gold on its surface, is on display in the Smithsonian Institution. Based on detailed geological investigations of the mine, the age of the formation has been determined as 54 to 56 Ma. The gold resources available from the mine was assessed as 9,000 tons of material with yield potential of 0.21 ounce of gold per ton.

== History ==
Crystal Mine was discovered in 1895 and the ten-stamp mill was installed in 1901. Operations were first undertaken in 1901–2, aided by a 20-stamp mill close to the shore at Snettisham, said to have produced approximately $25,000 work of gold. In 1903, the mine was purchased by the Alaska Snettisham Gold Mining Company and rapid development immediately began. At the close of the year 1903, the work done aggregated 1,000 feet (300 m) of tunneling and drifting along the ledge at different levels. These levels were connected by winzes and much of the intermediate ore was mined. Power was acquired by a flume over a 1 mile (1.6 km) in length, which follows the mountain slope at an elevation of 400 feet (120 m), collecting water from the many small creeks. This was connected with a pipe line, which supplied Pelton wheels at the mill, and a total of 300 horsepower was obtained. In 1904, mining continued, and most of the developed ore is said to have been stamped out and milled. Early in 1905, this company discontinued operations at Snettisham and plans were being made to remove both mill and mine equipment. During this time the ore mined up to 1905 in about 1,000 feet of underground workings yielded about 1,210 ounces of gold.

By 1909, 750 tons of ore had been processed. Work continued intermittently and had finally stopped in 1925. At that time the mine consisted of 2,350 feet of tunnels, 5 stages, a 175 ft upper adit with a stet. Gold produced after 1905 was not recorded.
