= Salmon Creek Dam =

Lake in the state of Alaska, United States

Salmon Creek Dam, Alaska
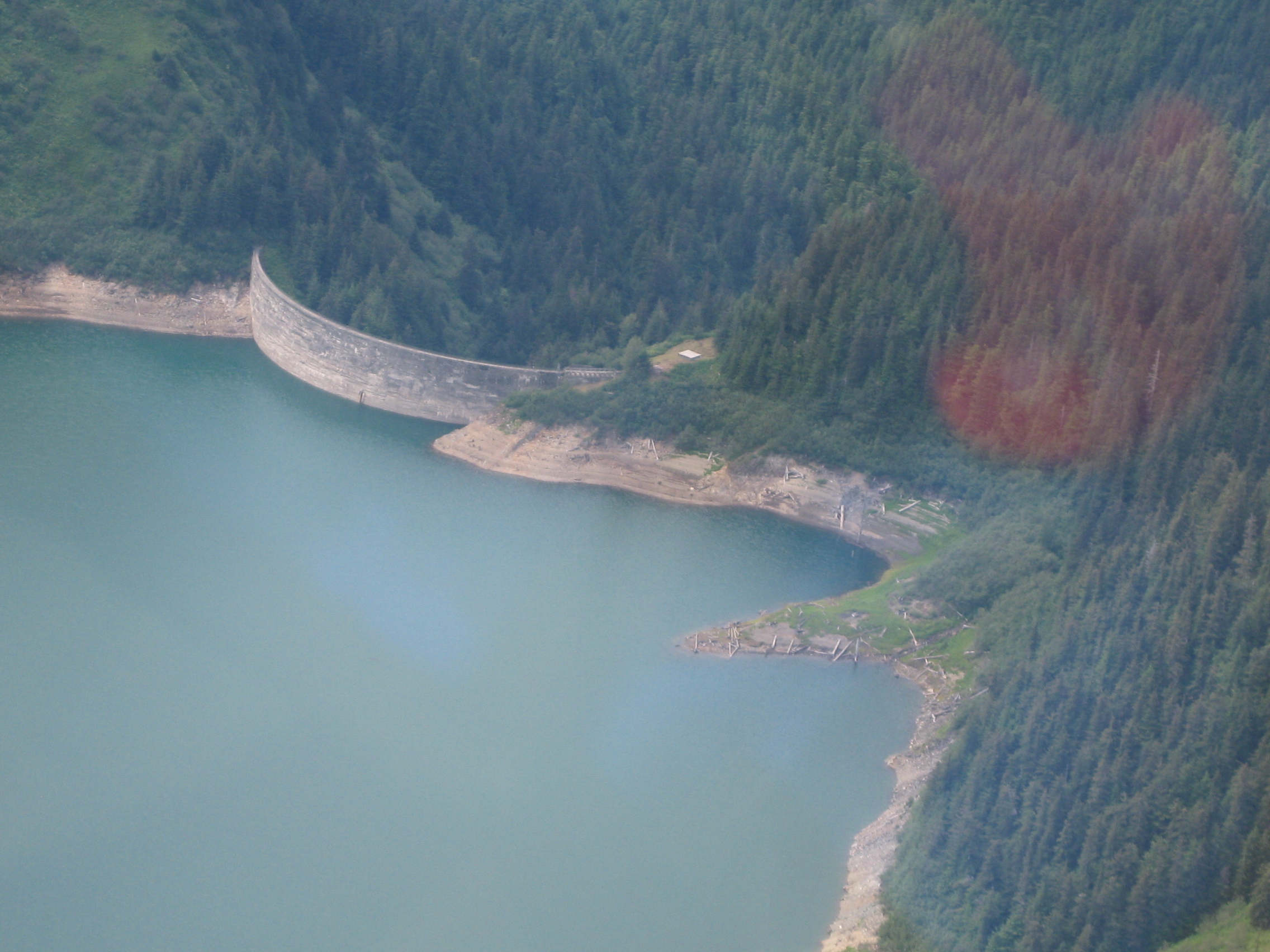
- Aerial view of Salmon Creek Dam in Juneau, Alaska

- Location within Alaska
- Official name: Salmon Creek Dam
- Location: Juneau, Alaska, USA
- Coordinates: 58°20′30″N 134°24′05″W
- Construction began: July 24, 1913
- Opening date: August 13, 1914
- Owners: Alaska Electric Light & Power (AEL&P)
- Operator: AEL&P

Dam and spillways
- Type of dam: Constant-angle concrete arch dam
- Height: 175 ft (53 m)
- Length: 645 ft (197 m)
- Width (base): 6.5 ft (2.0 m) at top and 47.5 ft (14.5 m) at base

Reservoir
- Creates: Salmon Creek Reservoir
- Total capacity: 18,000 acre⋅ft (22,000,000 m^{3})
- Catchment area: 7.5 sq mi (19 km^{2})
- Surface area: 192 acres (78 ha)

Power Station
- Operator: AEL&P
- Commission date: 1914
- Installed capacity: 6.7 MW
- Annual generation: 29.5 GWh
- Multi-purpose use

The Salmon Creek Dam is a concrete arch dam on the Salmon Creek, 3 miles (5 km) northwest of Juneau, Alaska. Built in 1914, it is the world's first constant-angle arch variable radius dam. Since it was built, over 100 such dams have been constructed all over the world. The dam was designated as a National Historic Civil Engineering Landmark by the American Society of Civil Engineers in 2022.

The dam was built by the Alaska-Gastineau Mining Company to meet the electrical energy needs for mining operations. The dam continues to be fully functional for hydroelectric generation, as one of the drinking water sources to Juneau city and for aquaculture and fishing. When built, adoption of the constant arch design for the dam reduced costs by 20% because less concrete was needed to construct the dam. Of the two hydroelectric power stations built at the initial stage (one at the upper level and the other at the lower level) – the latter one is still in use after a new powerhouse was built adjoining the old one – it produces 10% of the energy needs of Juneau city. When built, the dam and its two power plants were considered engineering wonders. Both are operated and maintained by the Alaska Electric Light & Power (AEL&P).

== Topography ==
The dam was built in a forested, scenic and narrow valley of the Salmon creek, which runs from Salmon Creek Reservoir and flows southwest for 3 miles (4.8 km) to the Gastineau Channel. The dam (marked as Juneau B-2 in USGS maps) is located at the terminus of the tram-way that was built specifically by the Alaska Gastineau Mining Co. The tram-way was built for hauling material for constructing the dam and its associated power stations. The power supply was for the mines located at a site 6 miles (9.7 km) to the south at Sheep Creek. However, a 3 miles (4.8 km) long road had been built by AEL&P to the upper powerhouse at the base of the Salmon Creek Dam, which has since been de-commissioned.

The creek runs for a length of 3 miles (4.8 km) within the watershed, which has a creek divide of 1.5 miles (2.4 km) and a ridge line of 2.2 miles (3.5 km). The stream bed has large gravel and bedrock substrata and its gradient decreases downstream of the dam. The average width of the stream is 30 feet (9.1 m) and depth of water is about 1.5 feet (0.46 m). The basin is surrounded by hills with steep slopes and with elevation above 980 feet (300 m) above sea level. The distance from the dam to Juneau city is 2.9 miles (4.7 km), to the Juneau harbor is 3.2 miles (5.1 km), and to the Juneau Harbor Seaplane Base is 3.4 miles (5.5 km).

== Evolution of the arch dam design ==
During the Roman period, the theory of building a curved dam (arch dam) was known as a means to withstand the water pressure and hold the masonry joints. However, in the background of masonry arch dams which dominated dam building scenario in the 19th century and with introduction of concrete technology for building dams, the structural design of arch dams underwent a dramatic change in its economic evolution to minimize use of construction material and inter alia, the cost of construction. Basically, an arch dam is a structure that curves upstream and the water pressure is transferred either directly to the valley sides or indirectly through concrete abutments. Theoretically, the ideal constant angle arch in a V-shaped valley for such an arch dam has a central angle of 133° of curvature. This theory led to the development of the "constant-angle" (or variable radius) arch dam, which was also thinner in design. The theory was first initiated in North America for several dams, and in Alaska in particular, in 1913 with the building of the Salmon Creek Dam, which was completed in 1914. In this regard, Bartlett Lee Thane, the mining engineer, who made a lasting impact in the mining industry – in the Alaska-Gastineau Mining Company – was instrumental in introducing this design of thin arch dam with help from his former football team mates. Lars Jorgensen evolved the specific first design of the constant arch dam. However, AEL&P gives design credit to their then Chief Engineer Harry L. Wallenberg for the Salmon Creek Dam. The idea for building such a dam had been thought about 30 years earlier to economize on the use of construction material for building the dam. However, it was only in 1913 that the concept was transformed on ground by the pioneer mining engineer Thane.

== Theory and design ==
In arch dam design, two basic shapes are adopted. These are the constant–radius arch and the constant-angle arch, the latter design is more complex. In the constant-radius arch design, which is also known as the single-radius arch, the shape of the dam is cylindrical with vertical upstream face while the downstream face is battered. The constant-angle arch design has also a variable–radius arch. In this design, the central opening angle is constant whereas the arch radius increases from the base to the crest; this increase towards the crest is proportional to the increase of the canyon width of the gorge. Further, according to the theory of constant-arch design, the arch action at the base of the dam exerts the maximum pressure on the base. A V-shaped gorge in particular is considered an ideal feature for building this type of dam. This design ensures substantial savings in use of construction material as opposed to the constant–radius arch design. Lars R. Jorgenson who had conceived this concept had proved that the most economic design of the dam was obtained with an optimum opening angle of 133.6°, with the least quantity of concrete. This design was applied with some modifications for the Salmon Creek Dam, which was designed with constant opening angle of 113° with radius varying from 147.5 feet (45.0 m) at the base to 331 feet (101 m) at the crest.

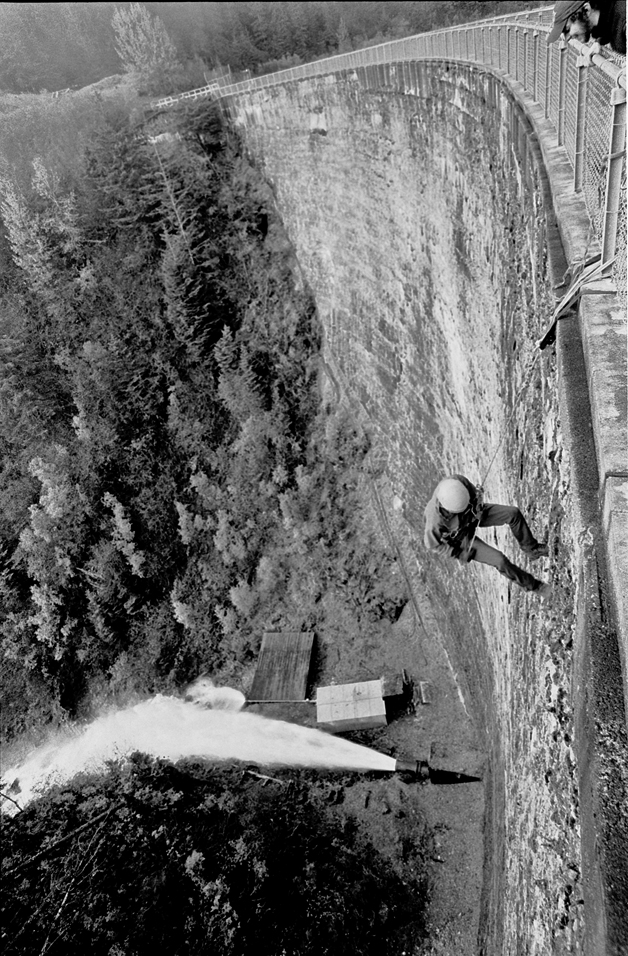
The spillway pipe has a diameter of 4 feet (1.2 m). It is shown here in full flow.

The "V" shape of the gorge at the dam site was adjudged ideal for building this type of dam at Salmon Creek site.

An ice pressure of 10 tons per square foot (500 kPa) was considered based on the rim conditions of the reservoir and the design was also checked for an ice pressure of 20 tons per square foot (1,000 kPa); in the latter case the safety factor in concrete under resultant compression values was considered to be 5 and safe. The dam was designed with a base width of 47.5 feet (14.5 m) (width of 37.5 feet (11.4 m) is also mentioned in one source) and it tapers to a width of 6.5 feet (2.0 m) (6 feet (1.8 m) is also mentioned in one source) at the top over a dam height of 168 feet (51 m). The geological condition at the base of the dam also dictated the type of dam as a flat rocky bed of 75 feet (23 m) width was available to lay the foundation for the arch dam without resorting to large-scale excavations. The dip of the rock was also steep both on upstream and downstream side of the flat base. Bank to bank, the crest length is 640 feet (200 m). The dam envisaged storage of about 18,000 acre-feet (22,000,000 m^{3}) at the full reservoir level while it is 445 acre-feet (549,000 m^{3}) when the water is 25 feet (7.6 m) deep. A steel outlet pipe of 4 feet (1.2 m) diameter was proposed to be embedded in the mid base of the dam as a spillway. The dam was planned with a top elevation of 343 feet (105 m) above sea level. The reservoir water spreads to an area of 192 acres (78 ha), while the catchment drained is 7.5 square miles (19 km^{2}).

Concurrently, two power houses were planned to generate power for the mining industry from the reservoir's water – an upper power station with a 3 MW capacity about 1 mile (1.6 km) downstream of the dam and a lower power station with a 3 MW capacity near the shore of the Gastineau Channel. The variable-radius type shape of the dam adopted for Salmon Creek became a standard for many high and large dams, particularly in western USA. An article from the National Science Foundation's SimScience project notes the following:

The upstream bulging served to offset the undercutting by the stronger curved lower arches near the abutments while the pronounced downstream toe reduced the tensile stresses at the upstream heel. The full realization of the new design was made possible by building the dam entirely out of concrete.

— SimScience

== Construction ==
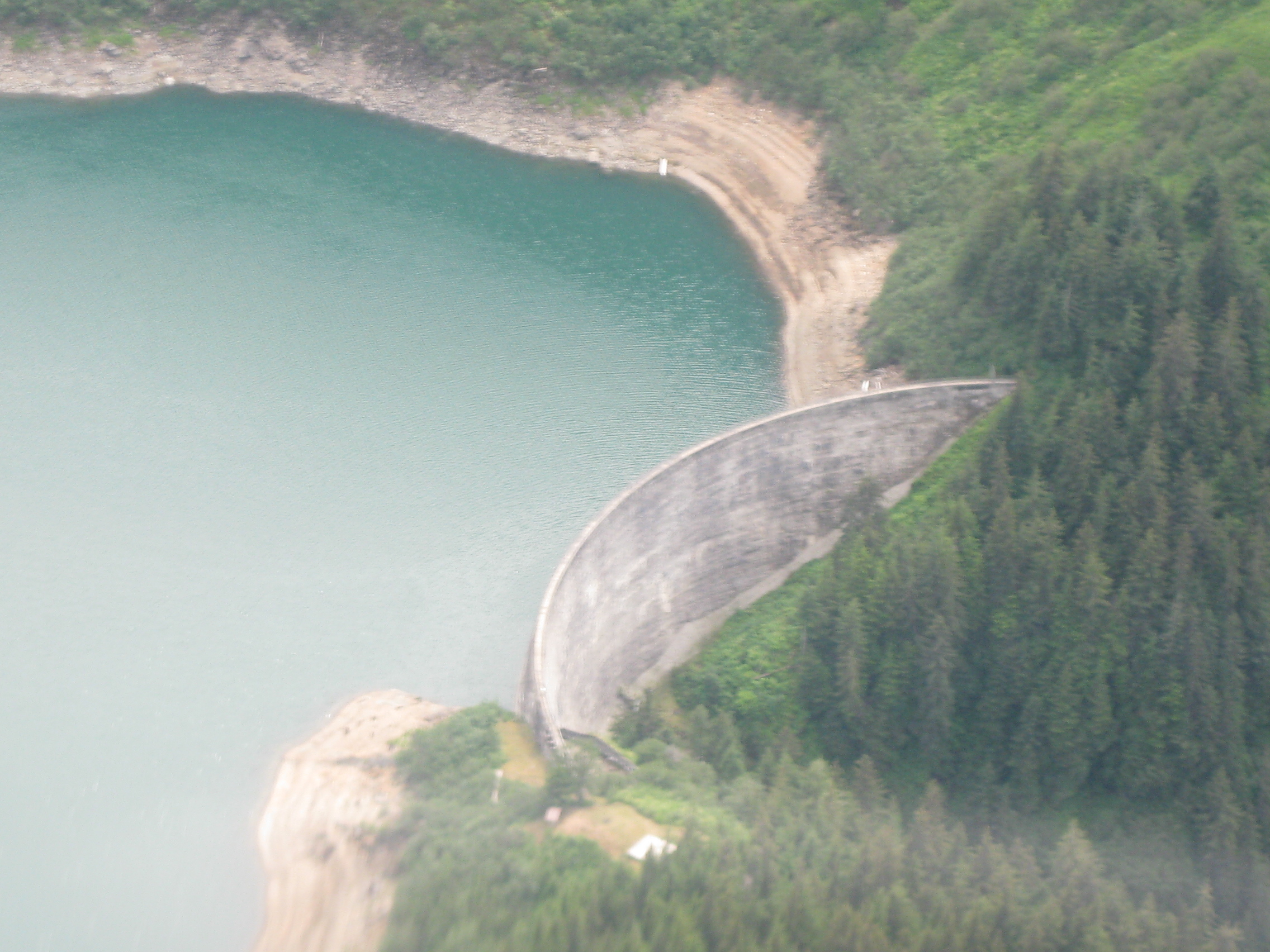
Close view of the downstream face of the Salmon Creek Dam.

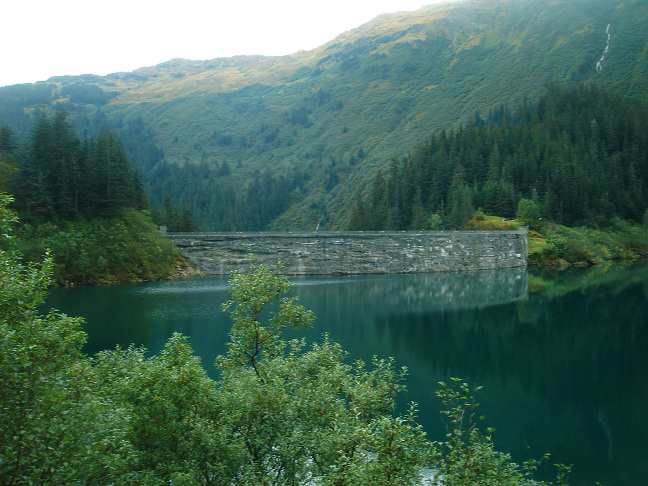
View of the upstream face of the Salmon Creek Dam.

Based on the plans prepared for the concrete arch dam and the two power stations, construction was started in May 1912. Construction of the lower power house on the shore at the confluence of Salmon Creek with Gastineau Channel was initiated first; a transmission line was erected from here to the mines in March 1913 and the construction of the dam was started in April 1913. Construction facilities for the dam were established upstream where aggregates (fine and coarse) were produced by crushing rocks at the crushing plant. The aggregates were mixed in designed proportions with cement and with a small admixture of lime to manufacture concrete for placing on the dam. The first batch of concrete was placed on the dam on July 14, 1913. The dam was completed, over a 13 months period, on August 13, 1914. A concrete quantity of 54,000 cubic yards (41,000 m^{3}) was placed on the dam. Concrete was placed at the rate of 400 cubic yards (310 m^{3}) per day.

Between 1912 and 1914, two power stations were built to utilize the water stored in the reservoir created by the dam. The first power station, the upper powerhouse titled 'Powerhouse 2', was located 1 mile (1.6 km) below the dam and had an installation of two units of 1.5 MW capacity each operating under a hydraulic head of 600 feet (180 m). The tail waters from this power station was conveyed through a 10,000 feet (3,000 m) long power channel to the second power station titled 'Powerhouse 1' located on the shore of the Gastineau Channel. The power house at this location also had two units of 1.5 MW capacity each operating under a head of 500 feet (150 m). Thus, the total generation from the two power stations was 6,000 kW (8,000 hp). In 1916, the average load on the two power stations was 5,187 horsepower (3,868 kW). Near Powerhouse 1 on the shore, office buildings, machine shops, saw mills, canteen and housing facilities for staff were also built.

== Rehabilitation ==
Since its completion, the dam and its two power stations have gone through many rehabilitation measures. Power House 2 was damaged in a fire in 1923. It was rehabilitated in 1935. It was finally abandoned in 1998.

With aging, the dam also needed to be rehabilitated and work was carried out in 1967. Deteriorated concrete was removed, the dam body was regrouted and the upstream face of the dam was provided with a layer of high strength concrete in the top 45 feet (14 m).

The lower power house also underwent major rehabilitation measures. It was shut down in December 1974 due to the high cost of operation and maintenance. In 1984 a new power plant was built adjoining the old powerhouse, with installation of 6.7 MW capacity.

== Benefits ==
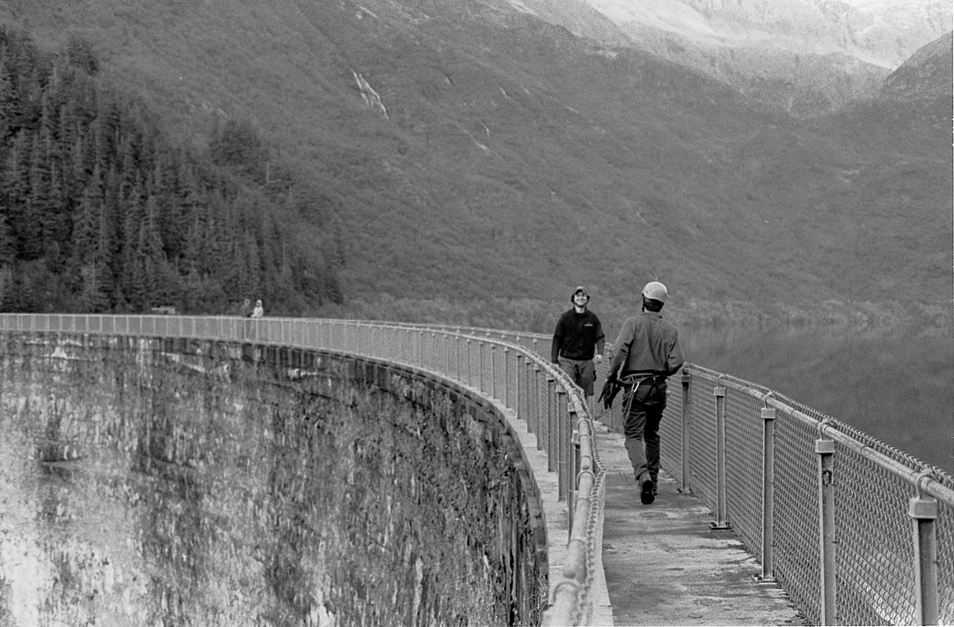
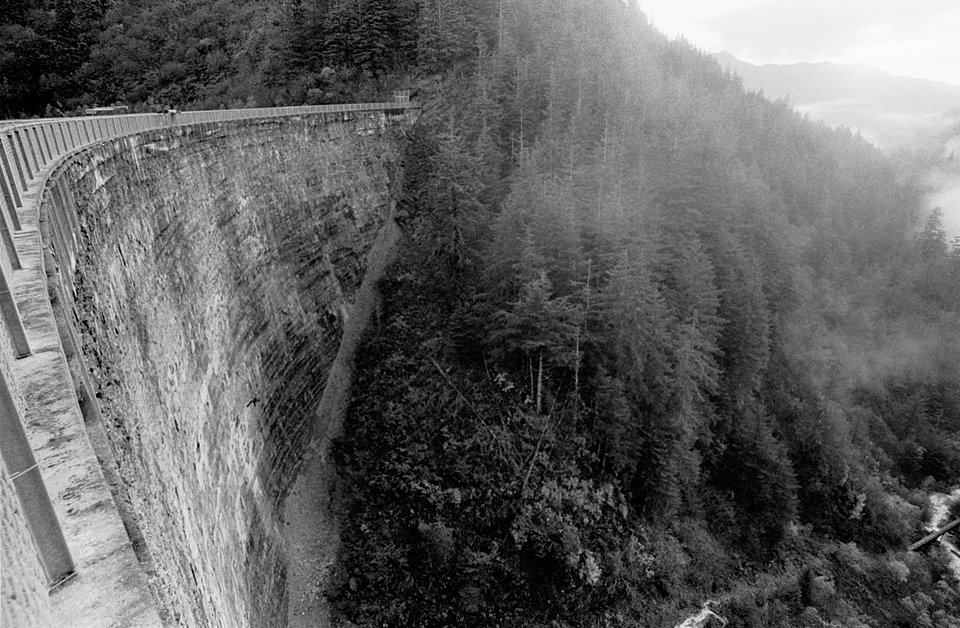
Left: Salmon Creek Dam in 2006 after rehabilitation; top of the dam 6.5 ft (2.0 m) walkway. Right: Salmon Creek Dam, full arch downstream view.

Even though the project was initially built for hydroelectric power generation to meet the mining requirements, it has over the years evolved into a multipurpose reservoir with benefits of power generation, drinking water and fisheries.

=== Hydroelectricity ===
The rehabilitated dam and the new power house facility at the lower house site are now fully functional. The generating capacity of the power station is 29.5 GWh annually, which accounts for nearly 10% of Juneau's power demand. Alaska Electric Light and Power operates and maintains the system.

=== Drinking water supply ===
Salmon Creek reservoir is a secondary source of drinking water which is provided in conjunction with Alaska Electric Light and Power Company (AEL&P). Water is drawn from near the Salmon Creek power generation plant, which is located near sea level. Tail waters from the power station are then pumped to a water treatment plant for membrane filtration, chlorination, and pH and alkalinity adjustment with soda ash before the water is supplied to the distribution system. This system was commissioned by the City Borough of Juneau (CBJ) in 2015. The reservoir is also used as chlorine contact tanks, where chlorine is added for purification and given time to react with any pathogens, before it is supplied to the city. However, this source is subject to seasonal high turbidity and also interruptions due to the annual maintenance of the generator units. This system is able to supply 2,000,000 US gallons (7,600 m^{3}) of water. The water resources are generally pollution-free and quality is monitored and tested every month to check for drinking-water standards set by the EPA and Alaska Department of Environmental Conservation (ADEC).

=== Fisheries ===
In 1880, the Salmon Creek was named by Richard Harris and Joe Juneau (during their first visit to the area for gold prospecting). The local people called it Tilhini meaning "dog salmon" a native name used by Tingit Alaskan Indian; this name is also shown in some early topographic maps. In 1917, fish propagation was established in Salmon Creek Reservoir by introducing 50,000 fry lings (small and young recently hatched fish) in the reservoir with assistance from Alaska Fish and Game Club, which maintained a hatchery at Juneau. This helped in propagating fish reserves of Salmon in the reservoir. It is reported that by the time the lake was opened for fishing, the fish measured 6 inches (150 mm) and could be caught with a fly of 6–8 inches (150–200 mm). Salmon Creek Reservoir is now open for bait fishing all the year round. Salmon fish varieties are many. Some fish species identified are: Dolly Varden, Brook Trout, Freshwater Trout, Salmon family, Chum Salmon and Coho Salmon.
