= Speel River =

Coordinates: 58°07′40″N 133°43′15″W

The Speel River is a river in the southeastern portion of the City and Borough of Juneau, Alaska. It begins at Speel Glacier and flows for 18 kilometers (11 mi) before entering Port Snettisham. It has a drainage area of 226 miles (363.71 km), typically steep and wooded terrain.

A pulp mill operated along the Speel River during the 1920s, which produced 40 tons of pulp per day. The Speel Dam was proposed on the river in the 1950s and 1960s.
