= Thane Road =

Road in Alaska, USA

- Length: 6 mi (9.7 km)
- West end: AK-7 (Franklin Street) in Juneau
- East end: Thane Road in Thane

Thane Road is a road connecting Juneau with Thane, Alaska. The road is the location for a bicycle race event.
