= Sumdum mine =

One of the largest lead and zinc mines in United States

- Location: Alaska, United States
- Products: Lead, Zinc

The Sumdum mine is one of the largest lead and zinc mines in United States. The mine is located in north-western United States in Alaska. The mine has reserves amounting to 24 million tonnes of ore grading 0.37% zinc and 79.1 million oz of silver.

== Geology ==
The country rock in the proximity of the mine is a black graphitic slate, though the schist belt lies a short distance to the east. This slate is usually wrinkled, rich in carbonaceous matter, and scattered throughout are stringers and films of calcite, often carrying particles of pyrite. The mineral deposits are well-defined quartz-filled fissures, striking approximately parallel with the northwest trend of the country rock. They extend for a few hundred feet in a horizontal direction and have been mined to a depth of several hundred feet below their surface outcrops. Two such ledges, which have been largely developed, are known as the Sumdum Chief and the Bald Eagle. The former ledge varies from a surface width of 3 feet (0.91 m) to a narrow vein filling at a depth of 1,200 feet (370 m). The Bald Eagle ledge, on the other hand, increases from a surface width of 2 feet (0.61 m) to 20 feet (6.1 m) at a depth of 500 feet (150 m). In the latter ledge, the vein changes from a free-milling ore near the surface to a low-grade ore at 500 feet (150 m) in depth. Within the quartz bodies, the gold is not uniformly distributed, but is segregated here and there, forming rich pockets, which seem to represent enrichments where the main ledges are intersected by smaller quartz veins. The ore is essentially free gold and gold-bearing pyrite, with small amounts of galena and sphalerite. Quartz and calcite are the gangue minerals, and films of graphite occur between the fillings and the black-slate country.

== Geography ==
A tunnel 3,500 feet (1,100 m) in length undercuts the Bald Eagle vein 500 feet (150 m) below the surface outcrop and encounters the Sumdum Chief at a depth of 1,200 feet (370 m). From this working tunnel to the surface, most of the ledge material has been extracted by overhand stoping, and the slopes have been supported by square sets of timber. Below the tunnel level an attempt was made to mine the ore by underhand stoping.

== Mill ==
The mill contained 10 stamps with 4 large Frue vanners, and when running at full capacity, 10 tons of rock were milled per day at a cost of US$0.50 per ton. An 18 inches (460 mm) pipe 1,200 feet (370 m) in length brought the water from a flume, the lower end of which is 187 feet (57 m) above the power plant, and with the aid of two Pelton wheels, 170 horsepower were generated. From the mill, a wagon road, together with a short tramway, lead to the wharf, and over this, the concentrates were hauled, and the conveying wagons returned with freight for the mine.

== History ==
The total cost of production was estimated at US$2.50 per ton. During the autumn of 1903, the last of the developed ore was being mined and a diamond drill was in search of other bodies. This evidently failed to reveal anything of importance, operations ceased, and a portion of the mining plant was removed.
