= Thane, Juneau =

Thane, Alaska
- Location of Thane in the U.S. state of Alaska
- Coordinates (USGS GNIS 1410784): 58°15′51″N 134°19′49″W
- Country: United States
- State: Alaska
- Borough: Juneau
- Named for: Bartlett L. Thane
- Elevation: 141 ft (43 m)
- Time zone: UTC-9 (Alaska (AKST))
  - Summer (DST): UTC-8 (AKDT)
- Area code: 907
- FIPS code: 02-76700
- GNIS feature ID: 1410784

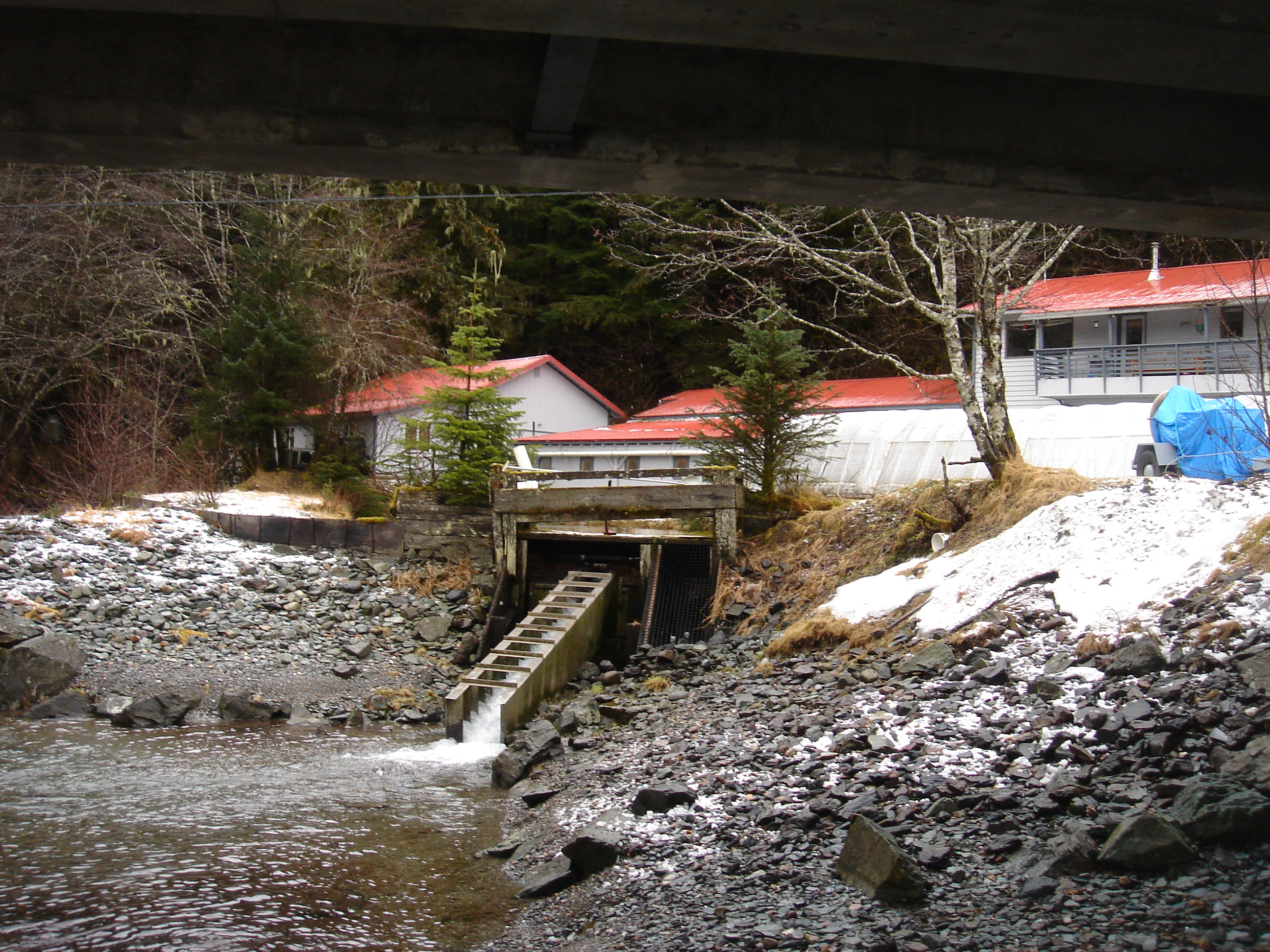
Sheep Creek Hatchery, seen from beneath the bridge carrying Thane Road over Sheep Creek.

Thane is a neighborhood in the City and Borough of Juneau in the U.S. state of Alaska. Located along Gastineau Channel, it begins one mile (1.6 km) south of downtown Juneau and consists of approximately five dozen houses spread over five miles (8 km). All the houses are located on Thane Road, which comes to a dead end about six miles (10 km) from downtown; there are no side streets. It was named for Bartlett L. Thane, Manager and Director of the Alaska-Gastineau Mining Company.

The only electric link to Snettisham hydroelectric dam - Juneau’s primary electric power plant - travels through Thane. Avalanches knock out this power line somewhat routinely, forcing the local power company, Alaska Electric Light & Power, to keep a series of reserve diesel generators on standby.

== History ==
Thane was founded in 1881 as a result of mining operations in the vicinity. Since World War II the population has steadily declined with the curtailment of mining activities. It is now a residential area (DeArmond, 1957, p43-44).

=== Etymology ===
The community was named in 1914 for Bartlett L. Thane, 1878–1927, general manager of the Alaska Gastineau Mining Co. which had its mill here. Thane was born in California and went to Alaska in 1897. The name Sheep Creek, which was the original miners' name for the town, was published by United States Coast and Geodetic Survey in the 1901 Coast Pilot, but was later changed to Thane by the United States Board on Geographic Names.

== Demographics ==
Historical population
Census	Pop.	Note	%±
1920	421		—
1930	68		−83.8%
1940	66		−2.9%
1950	81		22.7%
1960	82		1.2%
U.S. Decennial Census

Thane first appeared on the 1920 U.S. Census as an unincorporated village. It continued to appear until the 1960 census. It was annexed into Juneau soon after.

== Geography ==
Thane lies on the eastern shore of Gastineau Channel, 4 miles (6.4 km) southeast of Juneau and 6 miles (9.7 km) northwest of Point Salisbury, Coast Mountains.

== Government ==
Juneau assesses personal property and real estate taxes, and distributes a portion of collections to settlements within the Borough. Tax rates are generally low.

== Media ==
Radio and television broadcast are available either via satellite or from local broadcasts in Juneau, Alaska.
