= Alaska Electric Light & Power =

Electricity supplier for Juneau, Alaska

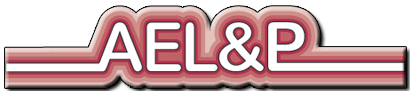
- Industry: Energy, Public Utility
- Founded: 1893; 133 years ago in Juneau, Alaska, United States
- Founder: Willis Thorpe
- Headquarters: 5601 Tonsgard Court, Juneau, Alaska, United States
- Products: Electricity
- Number of employees: 78
- Parent: Avista Corporation
- Website: aelp.com

Alaska Electric Light & Power, also known as AEL&P, is the power utility for Juneau, the capital city of Alaska. AEL&P gets their electricity primarily through the Snettisham hydroelectric power plant, located in an uninhabited region 30 miles (48 km) southeast of downtown Juneau, accessible only by boat and aircraft.

Founded in 1893 by Willis Thorpe, AEL&P is one of the only privately held utilities in the state. The company is Alaska’s oldest electrical utility and its oldest continuously operating corporation. It originally ran on local hydroelectric dams run by the mining-focused Treadwell Company. These first dams were constructed on Salmon Creek and Sheep Creek. The current plant at Snettisham was completed in 1973.

On July 1, 2014, Avista Corp., based out of Washington, bought out AEL&P's parent Alaska Energy and Resources Company.

AEL&P has a total hydroelectric capacity of 102 megawatts. The Snettisham Plant provides about two-thirds of Juneau’s electricity and has a generating capacity of 78.2 megawatts.

== Generation ==
AEL&P operates five hydroelectric generating facilities in Juneau with a combined capacity of 102.7 megawatts: Snettisham, Lake Dorothy, Salmon Creek, Annex Creek, and Gold Creek. Four of the facilities are owned by AEL&P, while the Snettisham Hydroelectric Project is owned by the Alaska Industrial Development and Export Authority (AIDEA). AEL&P operates Snettisham under a long-term power purchase agreement with AIDEA.

Snettisham has a capacity of approximately 78 megawatts and is the largest of the five facilities. Lake Dorothy, commissioned in 2009, has a capacity of more than 14 megawatts. Under normal conditions, AEL&P's base-load generation is entirely hydroelectric.

== Backup generation and isolated grid ==
AEL&P operates four diesel generating facilities with a combined capacity of 107.5 megawatts to provide backup service to firm customers when necessary. Juneau's electrical system has no interconnections with the transmission facilities of other utilities and has no pipeline access to natural gas or other fuels, making the community dependent on local generation and fuel supplies.

== 2008 avalanches and emergency power ==
On April 16, 2008, a series of avalanches destroyed and damaged transmission towers on the line connecting the Snettisham Hydroelectric Project with Juneau, severing the city's main source of hydroelectric power. AEL&P immediately switched to diesel generators to supply the city's electricity needs. Diesel consumption exceeded 80,000 gallons per day, while electricity costs increased from about 11 cents to 52.5 cents per kilowatt-hour. The resulting increase in electricity costs prompted widespread conservation efforts among Juneau residents and businesses. The transmission line was repaired and hydroelectric service restored after about 45 days.
