= Sheep Creek (Moreau River tributary) =

Stream in South Dakota, U.S.

Coordinates: 45°10′19″N 102°52′35″W

Sheep Creek is a stream in the U.S. state of South Dakota. It is a tributary of the North Fork Moreau River.

Sheep Creek was named after nearby Sheep Mountain.

== See also ==
- List of rivers of South Dakota
