= Sheep Creek (South Fork Grand River tributary) =

Stream in South Dakota, U.S.

Coordinates: 45°35′40″N 103°23′57″W

Sheep Creek is a stream in the U.S. state of South Dakota. It is a tributary of the South Fork Grand River.

Sheep Creek was named for the fact sheep grazed near it.

== See also ==
- List of rivers of South Dakota
