= Port Snettisham =

- Fjord
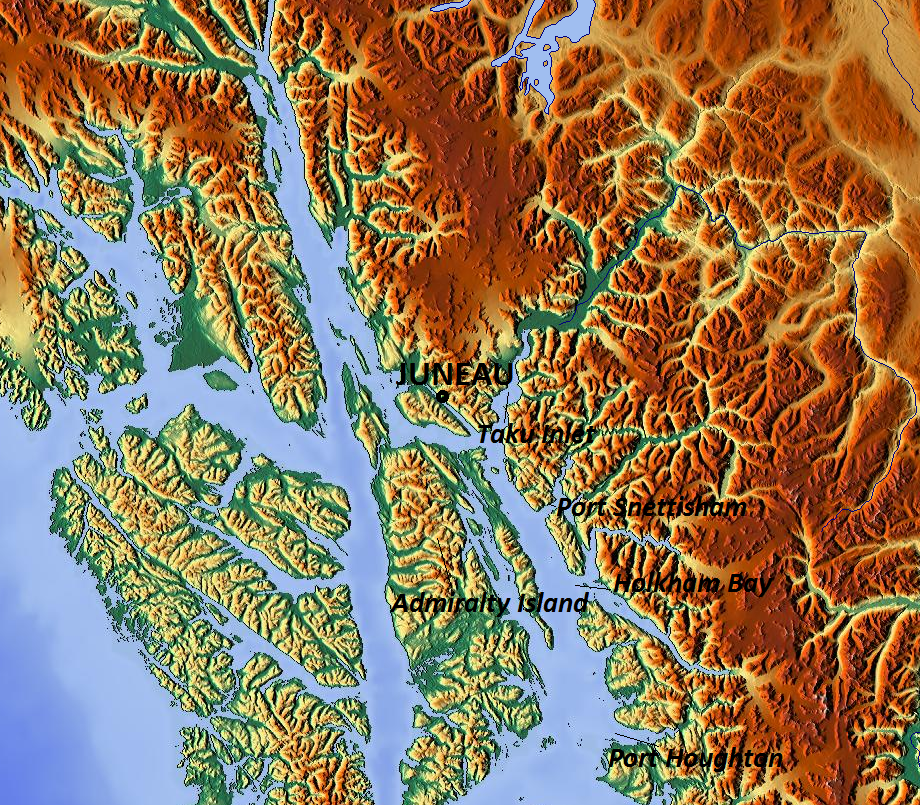
- Map

- Location in Alaska
- Coordinates: 58°00′20″N 133°46′21″W
- Country: United States
- State: Alaska
- Time zone: UTC-9 (Alaska (AKST))
  - Summer (DST): UTC-8 (AKDT)

Port Snettisham is a narrow fjord 30 miles (48 km) southeast of Juneau in the U.S. state of Alaska. It is a semi protected deep water port that was developed to transport many mineral deposits found in the Snettisham Peninsula. Lieutenant Joseph Whidbey of the Royal Navy discovered the fjord on August 12, 1794; George Vancouver named it after the town of Snettisham in England.

== Geography ==
The entrance to Port Snettisham is on the northeast side of Stephens Passage, to the east of Admiralty Island, about 50 kilometres (31 mi) southeast of Juneau and 30 kilometres (19 mi) from the Canada–US border to the east. The eastern shore to the north of Point Windham is a very large bay which is divided into two bays. The first bay is called the Holkham Bay and the other bay is named as Port Snettisham. Snettisham is an inland water way in the system of waterways in the partially protected system along the coasts of southeastern Alaska and Canada. It is a deep water bay which was proposed to be developed to facilitate transportation of magnetite.

The fiord has three branches. At the head of North Arm is Speel River, a swift-flowing stream which enters the Coast Range for a distance of 18 miles (29 km). The tributary to East Arm, a much shorter inlet, is Whiting River, traversing the mountain system for 35 miles (56 km), though not crosscutting it. This river is navigable in small boats for about 4 miles (6.4 km) from the mud flats at its mouth. At the head of South Arm are extensive flats which are bare at low water for a distance of 1 mile (1.6 km), and back of these is a low valley 5 miles (8.0 km) in length connecting with Holkham Bay. From the shore line, the land rises abruptly to peaks reaching heights of 4,000–6,000 feet (1,200–1,800 m). The Snettisham Peninsula, a promontory with peaks averaging 2,500 feet (760 m) in elevation, is connected with the mainland by a low pass less than 100 feet (30 m) above tide level. Snettisham post office is situated on the north end of this peninsula and 3 miles (4.8 km) inside the entrance to Port Snettisham.

== People ==
Historically, the Taku people have had several settlements at Port Snettisham, and still visit the area to fish, particularly for sockeye salmon.

== Economy ==
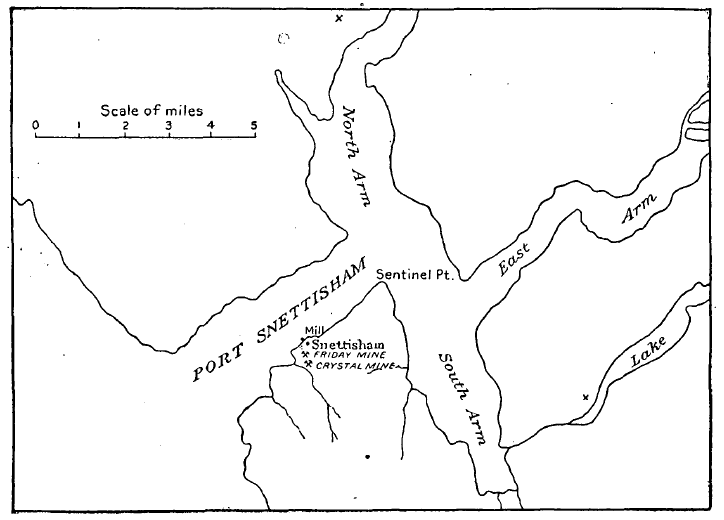
Map of Port Snettisham and principal mines

Several mineral deposits were discovered in the drainage basin of the port. The iron ore deposits identified in 1954 were located in a stretch of about 1,000 feet (300 m) to southwest of the Sentinel Point extending into the southeastern shore line of the port. It was suggested in 1954 to establish a small dock, deep enough for large ocean-going vessels. Of all the deposits developed, gold was the chief mineral output, mined by the Alaska Snettisham Gold Mining Company which was established on the south shore of the Port Snettisham, 3 miles (4.8 km) from the entrance.

The quartz ledge which constitutes the Crystal Mine was discovered by B. Heins in 1895. A 20-stamp mill was in operation by 1901. This mine was purchased in 1903 by the Alaska Snettisham Gold Mining Company, but operations were discontinued by 1905.

The Port Snettisham Iron Ore Property is located in Port Snettisham, and includes 49 contiguous properties, encompassing an area of 1,012 acres (410 ha), under an agreement between Arrowstar Resources Ltd. (formerly Gulfside Minerals) and Pacific Rim Mineral.

== See also ==
- Juneau gold belt
