= Healy Clean Coal Project =

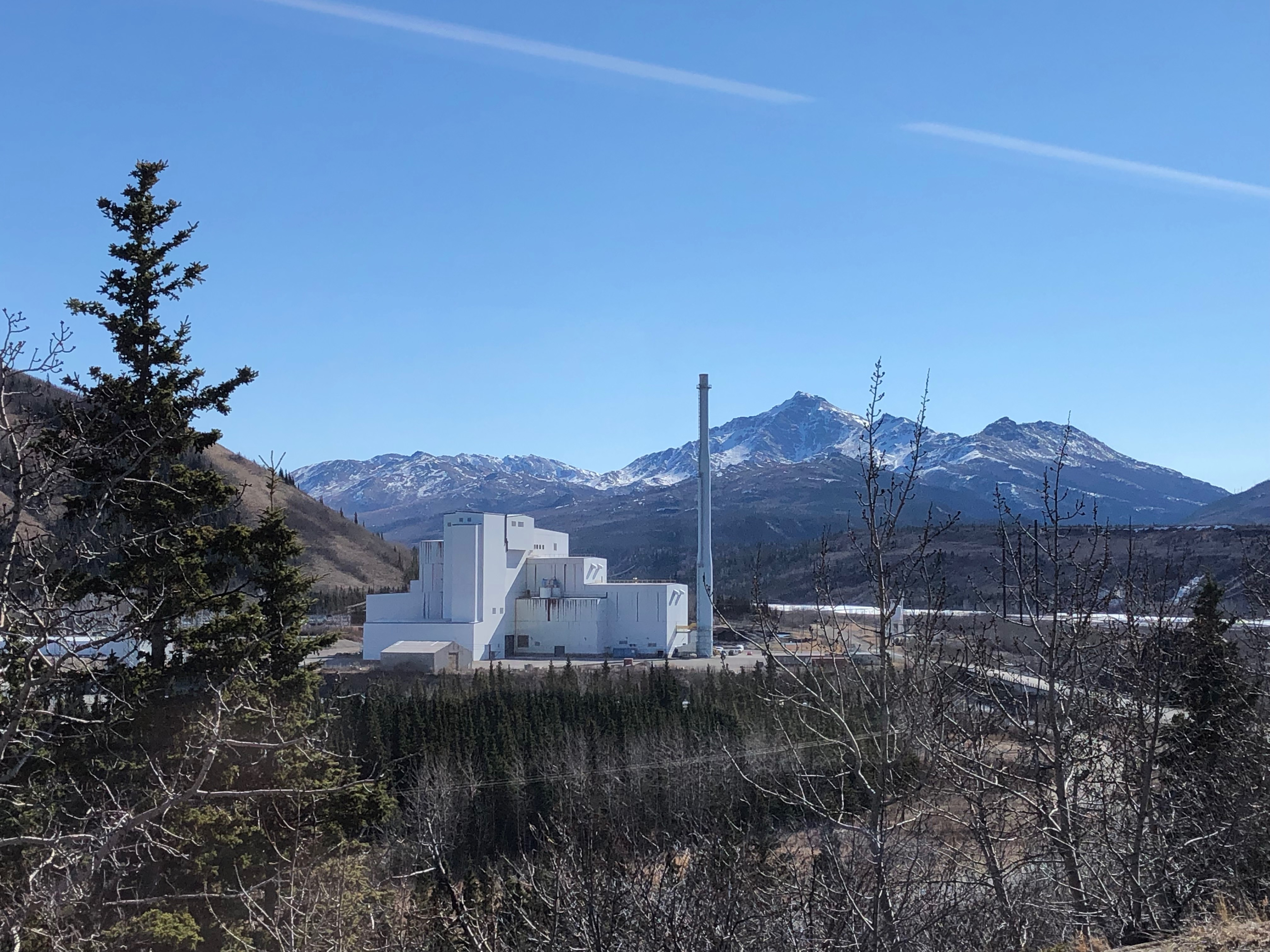
- Country: United States
- Location: Healy, Alaska
- Coordinates: 63°51′17″N 148°57′02″W
- Status: Shutdown in 2000, sale to GVEA pending
- Commission date: 1998
- Owner: Alaska Industrial Development and Export Authority (AIDEA)

Thermal power station
- Primary fuel: Usibelli Sub-bituminous coal
- Turbine technology: Clean coal technology

Power generation
- Nameplate capacity: 50 MW

Healy Clean Coal Project was a clean coal technology demonstration program consisting of a coal fired electrical power station located in Healy, Alaska in Denali Borough. The project was a demonstration of the TRW Clean Coal Combustion System and the Babcock & Wilcox/Joy Spray Dryer Absorber (SDA) System designed to reduce oxides of nitrogen (NOX) and sulfur dioxide (SO_{2}) emissions while burning a variety of coal types, including waste coal. The plant still operates as Healy Unit 2 but without the emissions-reduction technology.

The project constructed a plant adjacent to Golden Valley Electric Association (GVEA) 25 MW coal plant Healy Unit 1. Construction occurred from 1995 to 1997 at a cost of around $300 million. The facility operated briefly following its construction as part of the demonstration program, but has been shut down since 2000. The research project is considered "complete" by the Department of Energy. The plant was sold in 2012 to the GVEA to resume power production. It restarted in 2015, only to close the next year after an explosion. It resumed commercial operation in November 2018.

Healy Unit 2 will be shut down in 2024 and Unit 1 will receive an emissions control system.

== Costs ==
According to Golden Valley Electric Association (GVEA) the facility cost around $300 million, with the United States Department of Energy contributing $120 million, the Alaska Legislature contributing $25 million, the Alaska Industrial Development and Export Authority (AIDEA) contributing $150 million and both GVEA & Usibelli Coal Mine contributing $10 million in addition to in-kind contributions.

== See also ==
- Clean coal technology
