= Sheep Creek (Juneau, Alaska) =

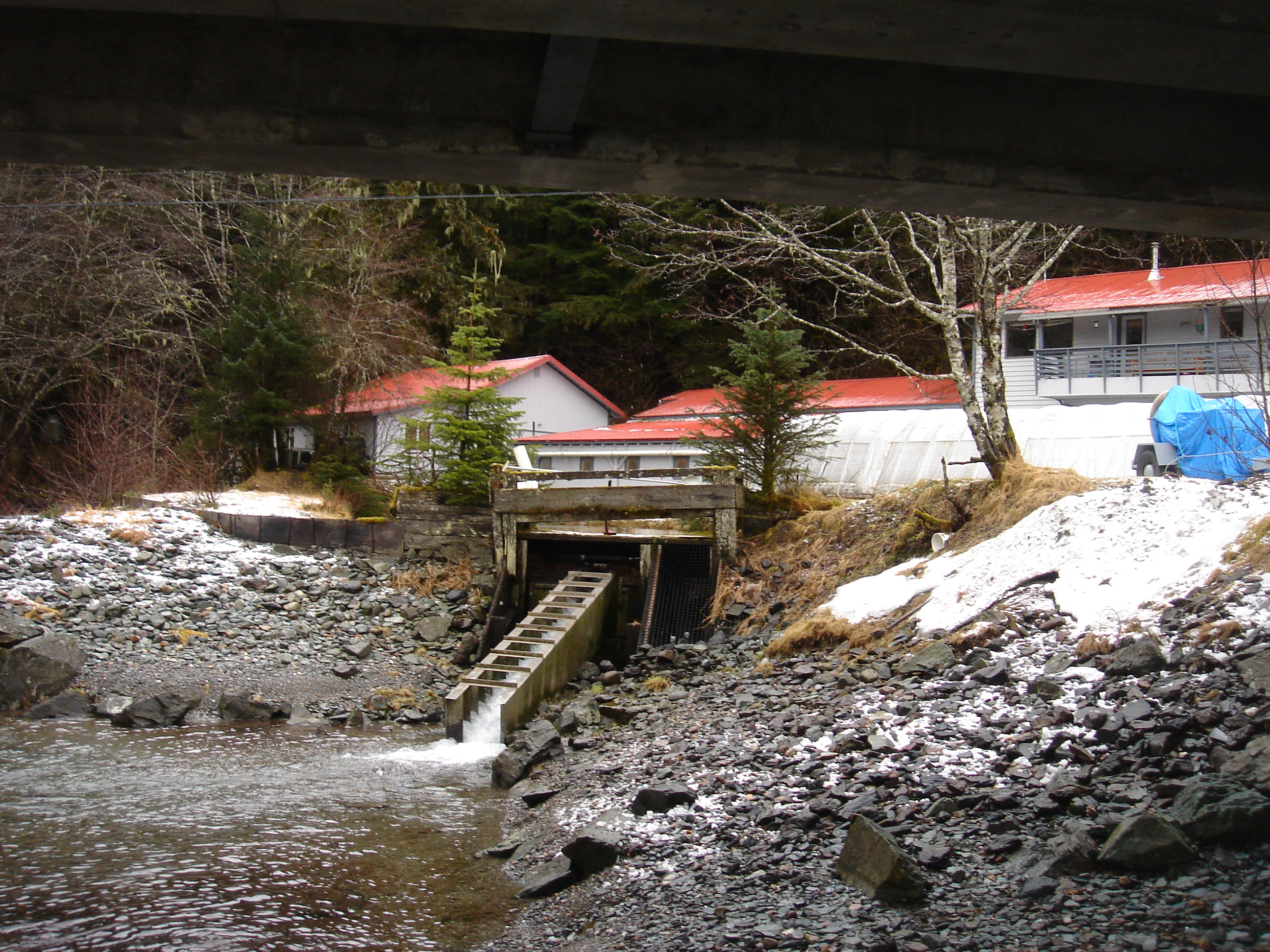
- Sheep Creek Hatchery, as seen from beneath the bridge carrying Thane Road over Sheep Creek

- Location of the mouth of Sheep Creek in Alaska

Location
- Country: United States
- State: Alaska

Physical characteristics
- Source
  - coordinates: 58°15′40″N 134°19′23″W
- Length: 3.5 km (2.2 mi)
- Basin size: 5 km^{2} (1.9 sq mi)

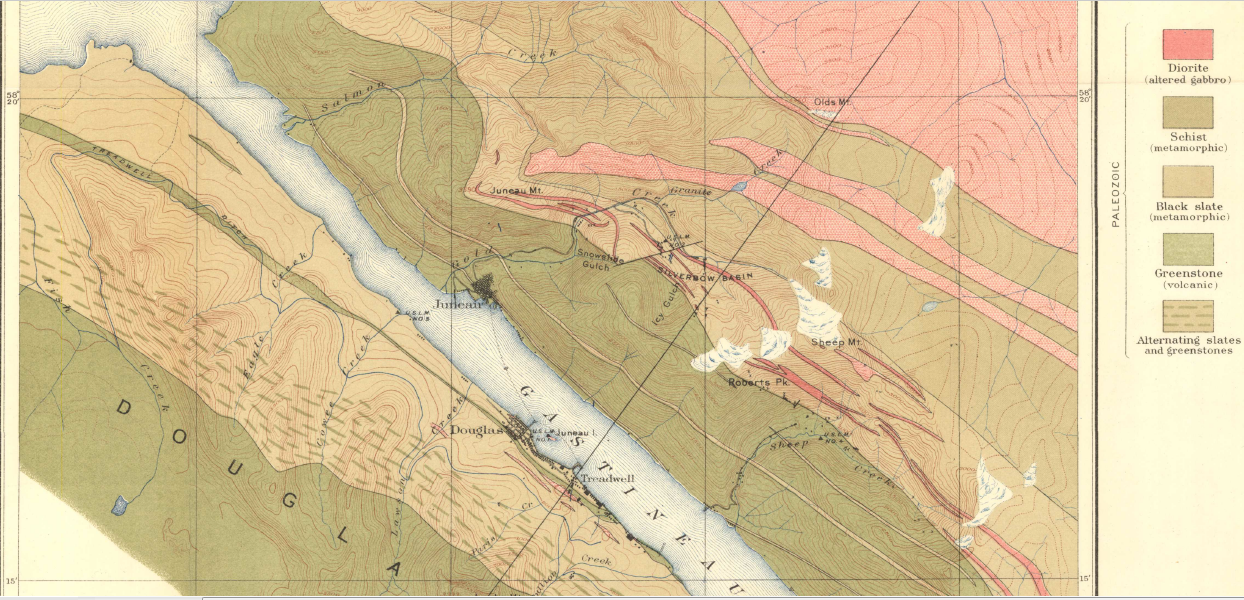
Geological map of the Sheep Creek area (lower right)

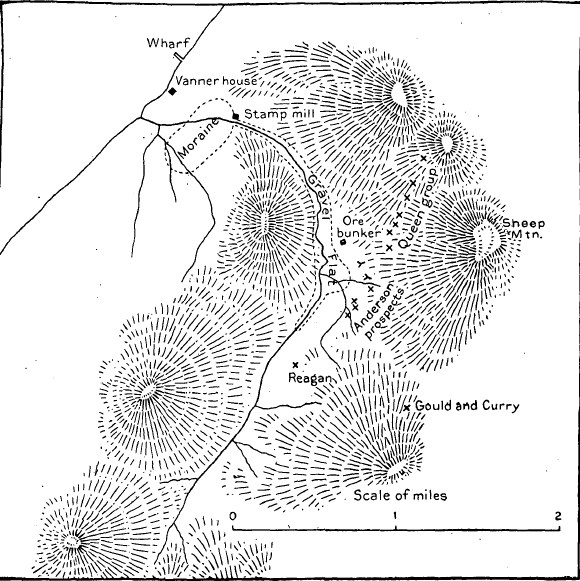
Sheep Creek map showing gold prospects

Sheep Creek is located 4 miles (6.4 km) southeast of Juneau, in the U.S. state of Alaska. The Juneau community of Thane was originally called Sheep Creek. Draining an area of about 5 square miles (13 km^{2}), it empties into Gastineau Channel. The valley formed by the river has a flat, gravel, trekking trail of 3.5 miles (5.6 km), south of Mount Roberts. The Snettisham hydroelectric dam substation is situated on a trail spur. Sheep Creek Hatchery is located at the outflow.

== Geography ==
Sheep Creek raises from the Sheep Mountain at an elevation of 4,238 feet (1,292 m). Flowing from the water parting next to Grindstone Creek, the course of the main valley runs from southeast to northwest. About 2 miles (3.2 km) from its head, the stream makes a broad turn and in the lower 1.5 miles (2.4 km), flows toward the southwest. The total length of the river valley is about 3.5 miles (5.6 km). The upper and lower thirds of its course have steep grades, but the middle course is over a gravel flat sloping from 700–550 feet (210–170 m) elevation. Below the gravel flat, the tributary slopes are very narrow and there are no side gulches. Practically all of the drainage comes into the upper basin, where the walls of the valley are steep, though up to an elevation of about 1,800 feet (550 m), they are covered with alder brush and grass, and are generally sodded nearly to the summit of the surrounding ridges. The latter are nowhere more than 1 mile (1.6 km) distant from the stream, though they rise to elevations of from 2,500–3,800 feet (760–1,160 m). The generally smooth, but somewhat corrugated character of the slopes points to the molding action of ice, and the recency of glaciation is indicated by the shallowness of the rills, which collect the drainage from the mountain sides.

The gravel trail is 3.5 miles (5.6 km) in length and provides access to the Mount Juneau Trail, the Granite Creek Trail and the Red Mill Trail and also many spur trails that lead to view locations and to mine ruins of historic value. The trail is wide and is in gravel formations and hence is not slippery as in the case of mud formed trails, and easy to access.

== Geology ==
The formations of Gold Creek extend without interruption southeastward to Taku Inlet, but only the two outer divisions—namely, the black slate and the group of green stones and intercalated slate—are cut by Sheep Creek. On the ridge between Gold and Sheep creeks, the band of slates with their intrusive dikes of dark diorite is about 6,800 feet (2,100 m) across and this width is only slightly diminished in the vicinity of the Grindstone Creek divide, 3.5 miles (5.6 km) distant. The black slates contain dikes of dark diorite (altered gabbro), which follow the general trend of the formation. However, these rocks have not been greatly affected by vein waters. On the southeast ridge of Sheep Mountain and extending southeastward for 1.5 miles (2.4 km) is a somewhat irregular dike of the Coast Range-type of diorite. This rock has been impregnated to a certain extent by sulphides and locally contains stringers of quartz. This intrusion cuts a dike of the dark diorite.

== Flora and fauna ==
Notable flora reported are berries on which the bears feed in the entire valley, wild geranium, columbine, Dodecatheon, or "shooting stars", Fritillaria affinis or "chocolate lilies", blueberry and salmonberry bushes.

The fauna reported in the valley are: Mountain goats and black bear. During late summer, chum salmon (also called dog) Oncorhynchus keta fully clog the stream waters from bank to bank, and is popular location to witness the fishes and also do fishing in the stream. Sheep Creek Hatchery was established in 1980 with the objective of incubating about 40 million pink and/or chum salmon for use in commercial fisheries. The Coho Annex facility became part of this hatchery as the coho brood stock source. In the following years, this expanded into the Macaulay Salmon Hatchery, which is now the coho rearing facility.

== See also ==
- Juneau gold belt
