= Snettisham hydroelectric power plant =

Hydroelectric plant in Alaska, U.S.

Coordinates: 58°10′00″N 133°44′00″W

The Snettisham hydroelectric power plant is a 78 MW power plant located 28 miles south of central Juneau, Alaska and accessible only by boat or seaplane. The power plant is fed by two lakes that are tapped from below, negating the need for a traditional dam. As of 2020 it supplies 65% of the electricity for Alaska Electric Light & Power. It is connected to Juneau by a 44-mile transmission line.

It was completed in 1973.

== Climate ==
Climate data for Snettisham Power Plant, Alaska, 1991–2020 normals, 2003–2023 extremes: 29ft (9m)
Month	Jan	Feb	Mar	Apr	May	Jun	Jul	Aug	Sep	Oct	Nov	Dec	Year
Record high °F (°C)	47 (8)	49 (9)	57 (14)	66 (19)	81 (27)	88 (31)	90 (32)	87 (31)	77 (25)	65 (18)	55 (13)	51 (11)	90 (32)
Mean maximum °F (°C)	41.7 (5.4)	42.2 (5.7)	48.1 (8.9)	59.2 (15.1)	72.6 (22.6)	79.5 (26.4)	78.7 (25.9)	78.2 (25.7)	69.3 (20.7)	57.8 (14.3)	45.7 (7.6)	41.6 (5.3)	83.4 (28.6)
Mean daily maximum °F (°C)	30.3 (−0.9)	33.0 (0.6)	38.0 (3.3)	48.1 (8.9)	57.5 (14.2)	63.0 (17.2)	63.4 (17.4)	62.6 (17.0)	55.8 (13.2)	46.3 (7.9)	36.2 (2.3)	31.0 (−0.6)	47.1 (8.4)
Daily mean °F (°C)	26.1 (−3.3)	28.0 (−2.2)	31.7 (−0.2)	40.1 (4.5)	47.7 (8.7)	54.4 (12.4)	56.5 (13.6)	56.0 (13.3)	50.4 (10.2)	41.7 (5.4)	32.4 (0.2)	27.3 (−2.6)	41.0 (5.0)
Mean daily minimum °F (°C)	21.9 (−5.6)	23.1 (−4.9)	25.5 (−3.6)	32.1 (0.1)	37.9 (3.3)	45.8 (7.7)	49.6 (9.8)	49.4 (9.7)	44.9 (7.2)	37.1 (2.8)	28.6 (−1.9)	23.5 (−4.7)	35.0 (1.7)
Mean minimum °F (°C)	5.0 (−15.0)	8.3 (−13.2)	12.5 (−10.8)	24.6 (−4.1)	31.7 (−0.2)	39.5 (4.2)	44.4 (6.9)	43.6 (6.4)	36.8 (2.7)	29.0 (−1.7)	16.6 (−8.6)	9.5 (−12.5)	0.4 (−17.6)
Record low °F (°C)	−11 (−24)	−6 (−21)	−7 (−22)	16 (−9)	23 (−5)	34 (1)	40 (4)	40 (4)	33 (1)	19 (−7)	0 (−18)	−2 (−19)	−11 (−24)
Average precipitation inches (mm)	18.56 (471)	14.88 (378)	10.90 (277)	8.99 (228)	8.31 (211)	6.85 (174)	10.24 (260)	13.99 (355)	27.01 (686)	28.90 (734)	21.08 (535)	19.98 (507)	189.69 (4,816)
Average snowfall inches (cm)	50.2 (128)	44.9 (114)	35.9 (91)	4.7 (12)	0.1 (0.25)	0.0 (0.0)	0.0 (0.0)	0.0 (0.0)	0.0 (0.0)	2.6 (6.6)	31.0 (79)	47.8 (121)	217.2 (551.85)
Average extreme snow depth inches (cm)	48.9 (124)	61.8 (157)	65.4 (166)	50.7 (129)	23.4 (59)	0.0 (0.0)	0.0 (0.0)	0.0 (0.0)	0.0 (0.0)	2.0 (5.1)	16.5 (42)	33.6 (85)	71.8 (182)
Average precipitation days (≥ 0.01 in)	21.4	16.9	15.8	18.0	15.4	18.4	18.8	20.2	21.6	23.9	19.9	20.5	230.8
Average snowy days (≥ 0.1 in)	13	11	9	3	0	0	0	0	0	1	9	14	60
Source 1: NOAA
Source 2: XMACIS2 (extremes & 2003-2023 snow)
