= Climate change in Alaska =

Climate change in the US state of Alaska

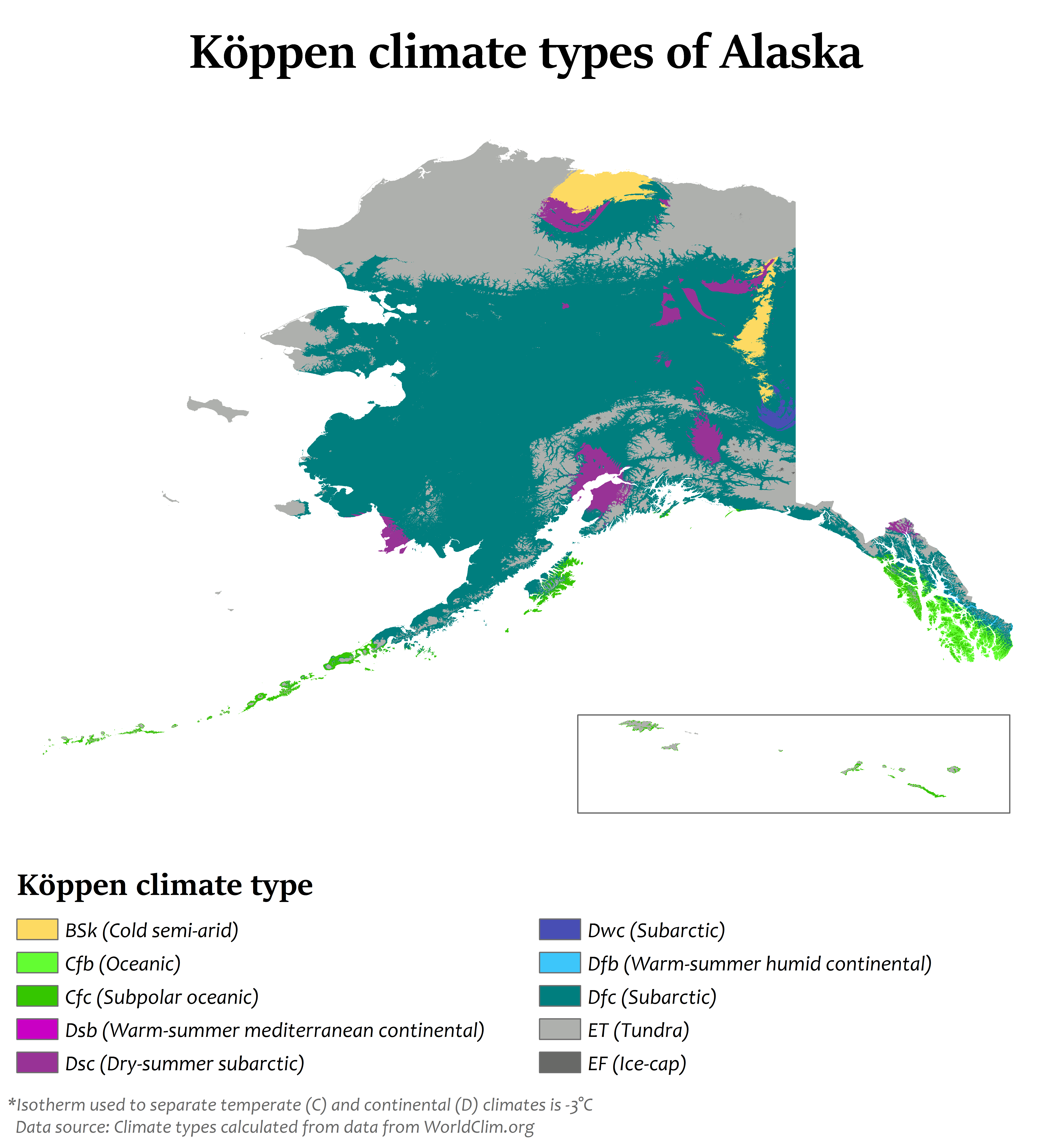
Köppen climate types in Alaska.

Climate change in Alaska encompasses the effects of climate change in the U.S. state of Alaska.

With winter temperatures increasing, the type of precipitation will change. Lack of snow cover on the ground will expose tree roots to colder soils, and yellow cedar is already showing the result of this with many trees dying. The melting of glaciers in the watershed is likely to accelerate and will cause hydrological changes that will impact the wetland habitats and the distribution of wildlife. Animals such as the black-tailed deer, moose and mountain goat may benefit from less snow cover, while such mammals as the northwestern deer mouse that tunnels under the snow are likely to be disadvantaged.

The Alaska Climate Change Sub-Cabinet was established in 2006 to advise the Governor on climate change strategy, including opportunities to reduce greenhouse gas emissions through the use of alternative fuels, energy conservation, fuel efficiency, and transportation planning.

== Observed effects of climate change ==
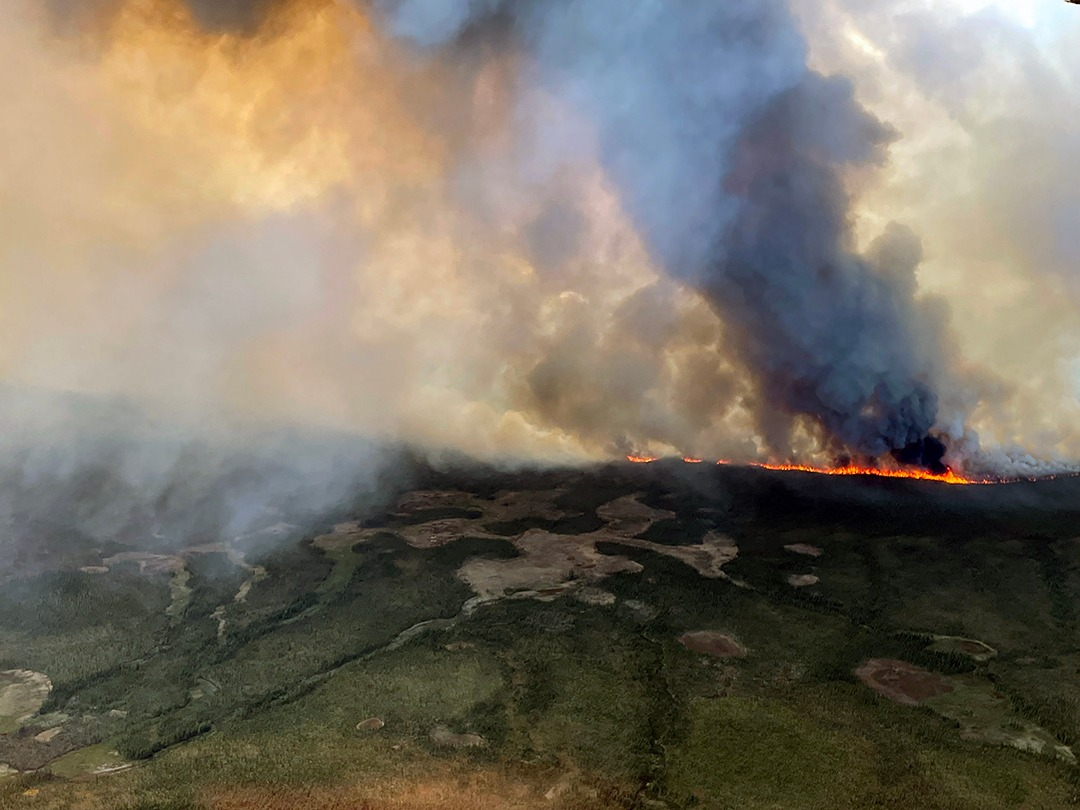
Hog Butte Fire, Alaska, June 2022

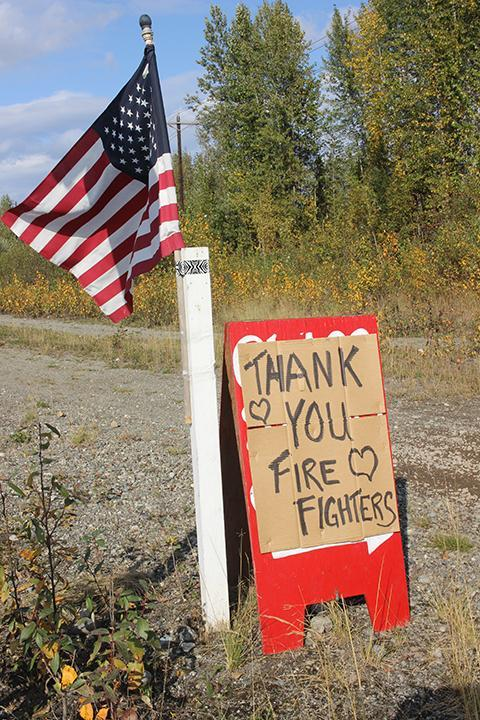
Sign thanking firefighters, Deshka Landing Fire, 2019.

In August 2016, the Environmental Protection Agency (EPA) reported that "[o]ver the past 60 years, most of the state has warmed three degrees (F) on average and six degrees during winter" As a result of this temperature increase, the EPA noted that "Arctic sea ice is retreating, shores are eroding, glaciers are shrinking, permafrost is thawing, and insect outbreaks and wildfires are becoming more common". The EPA further noted that these changes were likely to accelerate in the future, potentially causing infrastructure damage due to thawing permafrost, and a decline of the state's fishing industry.

The temperate rainforest in southeast Alaska, in the Tongass National Forest is a perhumid (always wet) temperate rain forest. A perhumid temperate rainforest is a rainforest that receives above ten percent of its annual rainfall during the summer. Another contributing factor to define a perhumid rainforest is transient snow must be present in the winter with mean annual temperatures of 7 °C. These qualities define the rainforest as cool and temperate.

At present, the southeast Alaskan temperate rainforest is strongly dominated by old growth stands. The vegetation is strongly represented by a series of conifers; Sitka spruce, western hemlock, mountain hemlock, amabilis fir, shore pine, western red cedar, and Alaska yellow cedar. This forest, unlike its neighboring regions to the north and south, is completely safe from fires. Fire is virtually nonexistent in the southeast region due to the moist and cool climate. Small scale windthrow is the main disturbance that affects the rain forest in this region. Temperatures and precipitation in the southeast region of Alaska for the year of 2011 have matched what a typical temperate rainforest needs to be defined as one by DellaSala. Juneau, Alaska, received 2,940 millimeters (115.9 inches) of precipitation and averaged 40.6 °F during 2011. Snowfall, as will be discussed in further detail later, is an important player for the temperate rainforest in this region, and the Juneau area received 1,690 millimeters (66.4 inches) which, converted to its liquid equivalent is 294 millimeters (11.59 inches). The weather characteristics of the southeast region match up very well with what a temperate rainforest needs as defined by DellaSala.

=== Coastal erosion ===
A number of communities in Alaska are expected to be effected by coastal erosion and sea level rise. A 2009 report by the Government Accountability Office identified 21 communities at direct risk, and recommended their managed retreat. For example, Kivalina, Alaska will be inundated by 2025.

=== Trans-Alaska Pipeline System ===
Heavy rains in Alaska resulting from climate change have brought flooding close to the Trans-Alaska Pipeline System in recent years. In May 2019, the Dietrich River flooded north of Coldfoot, eroding 7.6–15.2 meters (25–50 feet) of riverbank, necessitating emergency work that left only an 80-foot buffer between the river and the pipeline. A few months later, in August, the Sagavanirktok River flooded, eroding 30 meters (100 feet) of river bank, and leaving only a 30-foot buffer between the river and the pipeline. The Lowe River also flooded near the pipeline in March 2019, and again in June 2020. Although Alyeska appears to be responding by stockpiling construction and emergency response materials, and has installed ground chillers beneath a stretch of pipeline 92 kilometers (57 miles) northwest of Fairbanks, comprehensive information on plans for addressing pipeline breaks in "high consequence areas" is not readily available.

== Projected effects of climate change ==
Windstorms are the most relevant disturbance regime that impacts the southeast temperate rainforests. Stand-replacing wind storms happen in 100-year intervals and wind throw as a main disturbance will continue to be one of the main disturbances in the coming years. Wind protected areas that support old growth stands will become more prone to wind throw events. Stem decay and other disease agents have smaller impacts on these stands and are to be considered a finer scale and exclusive disturbance. With rising temperatures comes longer growing-season, and is predicted to increase growth rates of these fungi. Combined wind-throw events and fungi disturbances generate concern for persistence of old growth stands throughout the region. Decreasing old growth stands paves the way for an increase of early successional species taking over a greater proportion of area.

One species of tree, yellow-cedar, has already been observably impacted by the changing climate. The main disturbance to yellow-cedar in the northern part of the southeast region is lack or depletion of snow-pack. The yellow-cedar has been dying throughout an area of 200,000 hectares (770 sq mi) over the last 100 years. The yellow-cedar's fine root system is susceptible to cold soil temperatures; temperatures below −5 °C are lethal. Snow pack acts as an insulator to the trees root system. Rising temperatures means earlier snow-melt and later freeze-up dates. When insulated by snow, the temperature barrier remains in place and the tree's roots can survive. Onset of early spring freezing episodes will be detrimental to the yellow-cedar population.

Changing climate factors will also have a detrimental effect on the sea level surrounding Alaska. Since 1950, sea levels off of the coast of Alaska have declined as much as 810 millimeters (32 inches). This significant change is due to shifts in Earth's tectonic plates due to a process called glacial isostatic adjustment.

These changing climate factors are predicted to have a substantial influence on the condition of wildlife habitat. With increase in temperatures and a decrease of wetlands and streams raises the likelihood of fire risk, which is a prominent issue concerning the temperate rainforest.

The major biophysical factor that is prevalent in many areas that contain temperate rainforests is snow and glaciers. The continual warming in this region poses major hydrological changes that may impact the rainforest in the future. These hydrological changes will impact place species distribution and wildlife habitat.

=== Climate models ===
In order to predict how climate change might affect the southeast region of Alaska, there must be a standard of how the data will be collected and interpolated. The models used in the Scenarios Network for Alaska and Arctic Planning (SNAP) research took in to account a steady increase in carbon dioxide emissions from fossil fuel combustion over the first several decades of the 21st century. As the implementation of low-emission energy alternatives becomes more prevalent, a projected decline in CO_{2} emissions will occur. According to SNAP, this scenario is a moderate estimate. This scenario will be the standard for how the temperate rainforest in the southeast region will be impacted in the coming decades.

The southeastern region is projected to become warmer over the next century. Warmer temperatures in this region mean additional length to the growing season. These two changes in the ecosystem are likely to result in increase in evapotranspiration, enough to outweigh the increase of precipitation that is also predicted to occur throughout the region. Many scientists have already discovered typical signs of climate change in wetland drying and glacial recession.

Assuming a mid-range emission scenario described as, a world of rapid economic growth, a global population that peaks mid-century, rapid introduction of new and more efficient technologies, and a balance between fossil fuels and other energy sources. By using this scenario presented by the Scenarios Network for Alaska and Arctic planning, there is a predicted increase in average annual temperature by about 3 °F by the year 2040, increasing to 6 °F by 2080. The final result would be an increase of average annual temperature from about the current 42 °F to close to 48 °F over the southeast region of Alaska. More importantly than average annual temperature rises, is in winter temperatures. Winter temperatures could dramatically rise to 42 °F from the average of 36 °F. With winter temperatures increasing, the type of precipitation will change.

=== Projected effects on wildlife ===
Climate change effects on the wildlife in temperate rainforests in the southeast region will be influenced by decreasing snow-pack and lengthening of the growing-season. Snow depth impacts foraging and herbivore animals such as blacktailed deer (Odocoileus hemionus), moose, and mountain goat (Oreamnos americanus). Protection by snow-pack is taken advantage of by the northwestern deer mouse (Peromyscus keeni); decreasing snow-pack creates habitat concern for the deermouse. Conversely, less snow for less of time means bigger area of winter range for the blacktailed deer; this would create the availability of high quality foods in spring for the black tailed deer, which would ultimately decrease winter mortality.

The temperate rainforest that covers the Southeastern part of the state is a result of humid summers and transient snow cover in winter. The conifers that thrive in this moist climate are free from fire risk as compared to the forests to both the north and south. Warmer weather will lengthen the growing period of the trees and the increase in evapotranspiration is likely to outweigh the increase of precipitation. Assuming a scenario involving a mid-range increase in emissions, the average temperature may rise by about 3 °F by the year 2040 and by 6 °F by 2080. The trees will grow more vigorously but fungi that cause rot will also thrive, there is likely to be an increase in windthrow, and fire risk may rise.

== Climate change policy in Alaska ==
Alaska has approximately 737,000 residents and ranks 50th in the nation in terms of GDP, which is $75 billion. In 2005, Alaska ranked 26th in the nations industrial energy consumption at 417.3 trillion Btu and 4th in the nations industrial natural gas consumption at 356.7 trillion Btu. Alaska's leading industry is food manufacturing, which is responsible for 7,621 jobs, $230.2 million in payroll, and $1,925.1 million in shipments. In addition, there is one complete R&D in Alaska.

Governor Frank Murkowski created the Rural Energy Action Council to help guide Alaska's long-term energy policy.

The nine-member task force will make recommendations in several areas: incentives to lower energy delivery costs, regional supply and distribution centers, cooperative fuel purchases, power plant operational efficiencies, consolidation of energy providers, a review of Alaska Energy Authority programs, acceleration of wind turbine generator installations, and energy conservation measures.

The task force is responsible for reviewing and analyzing the state's current and long-term energy needs. It is to deliver its recommendations for a long-term energy plan for Railbelt Alaska by December 31, and to produce similar recommendations for Rural Alaska by March 31, 2006.

In making its recommendations for state energy policy, the task force will consider the needs of Railbelt communities, which are served by the state's main power grid, and those of rural Alaskans who live off the grid for reliable and renewable sources of affordable energy.

In 2018, the Climate Action Leadership Team a draft for new state-level climate policy. The draft outlined goals centered on reducing greenhouse gas emissions and increasing usage of renewables with targets for 2025 using market-based pricing. Governor Mike Dunleavy disbanded this team via executive order shortly after he was placed in office.

=== Biofuels ===
In certain geographic areas and during months in which fuel containing ethanol is required to be sold, transferred, or used in an effort reduce emissions carbon monoxide and attain air quality standards as required by federal or state law, the tax rate on fuel containing at least 10% ethanol by volume is reduced by $0.06 per gallon as compared to the tax rate on other motor fuels.

The state Department of Transportation (DOT) is required to consider using alternative fuels for automotive purposes whenever practicable. The DOT may participate in joint ventures with public or private partners that will foster the availability of alternative fuels for all consumers of automotive fuel.

=== Fossil fuel extraction approvals ===
In December 2020 the federal court of the United States rejected the approval of a large offshore oil project off the Alaska coast, claiming required review of emissions and wildlife impacts had not been performed. Environmental groups describe it as a victory for climate and polar bear protection.

In August 2021, a federal court blocked a planned oil and gas development project that would have constructed five drill sites and pipelines on public lands on Alaska's North Slope, stating that the project approval was based on a flawed environmental protection analysis. The federal judge said the environmental report lacked mitigation measures for polar bears and that the report's exclusion of greenhouse gas emissions from foreign oil consumption was "arbitrary and capricious". Conservation groups said the project would have released large amounts of greenhouse gases into the atmosphere and described the court decision as a step toward protecting public lands and the people who would be negatively affected by the project.

== Public response to climate change in Alaska ==
Alaska Youth for Environmental Action organized a climate strike in Anchorage in September 2019, arguing and including a petition to reinstate the Climate Action Leadership Team disbanded by Governor Dunleavy. Hundred of youth joined the march. One of the organizers of the strike, noted that many participants were inspired by Greta Thunberg, who had recently testified before Congress.

== See also ==
- List of U.S. states and territories by carbon dioxide emissions
- Plug-in electric vehicles in Alaska
