= 1960 Alaska Initiative 1 =

- August 9, 1960
- Moving Capital to Cook Inlet-Railbelt Area

Results
Choice	Votes	%
Yes	18,865	44.04%
No	23,972	55.96%
Election district results
Yes
80–90%
60–70%
50–60%
No
90–100%
80–90%
70–80%
60–70%

A referendum that was rejected by voters in the U.S. State of Alaska was held on August 9, 1960, in parallel with the state's primary elections. The proposal would have moved the state capital from Juneau to a settlement within the Cook Inlet and Railbelt area, to be chosen by a committee of five appointed by the Governor of Alaska. The capital of Alaska has long been the subject of efforts to be relocated, as Juneau is inaccessible by road to the rest of Alaska and the contiguous United States.

== Contents ==
The proposal appeared on the ballot as follows:

Moving Capital to Cook Inlet-Railbelt Area

It is proposed that on and after January 1, 1965, the Capital of the State of Alaska, which is by Section 20 of Article XV of the State Constitution located in Juneau, be relocated within the Cook Inlet-Railbelt area. The exact location within this area is to be selected by a committee of five to be appointed by the governor.

== Endorsements ==
Against
- Kodiak Daily Mirror

== Results ==
The measure was defeated, with approval of the initiative variying widely. While Initiative No. 1 ran up huge margins from the Anchorage metropolitan area, where the capital would have been moved to, it was near-universally rejected by Southeast Alaska, the home of the current capital, with support for the initiative being as low as one percent in some representative districts.

1960 Alaska Initiative No. 1
Choice	Votes	%
For	18,865	44.04
Against	23,972	55.96
Total	42,837	100.00

=== By election district ===
Region	Election district	For		Against		Margin		Total
Region	Election district	#	%	#	%	#	%	Total
South- eastern	1—Prince of Wales	8	2.08%	377	97.92%	369	95.84%	385
South- eastern	2—Ketchikan	45	1.60%	2,759	98.40%	2,714	96.79%	2,804
South- eastern	3—Wrangell-Petersburg	11	0.95%	1,149	99.05%	1,138	98.10%	1,160
South- eastern	4—Sitka	65	4.30%	1,448	95.70%	1,383	91.41%	1,513
South- eastern	5—Juneau	139	3.79%	3,526	96.21%	3,387	92.41%	3,665
South- eastern	6—Lynn Canal-Icy Straits	65	6.23%	978	93.77%	913	87.54%	1,043
South- eastern	Absentee	63	3.64%	1,669	96.36%	1,606	92.73%	1,732
SOUTHEASTERN TOTAL		396	3.22%	11,906	96.78%	11,510	93.56%	12,302
South- central	7—Cordova-McCarthy	63	14.86%	361	85.14%	298	70.28%	424
South- central	8—Valdez-Chitina-Whittier	194	39.11%	302	60.89%	108	21.77%	496
South- central	9—Palmer-Wasilla-Talkeetna	1,504	89.95%	168	10.05%	−1,336	−79.90%	1,672
South- central	10—Anchorage	11,425	84.26%	2,134	15.74%	−9,291	−68.52%	13,559
South- central	11—Seward	255	35.27%	468	64.73%	213	29.46%	723
South- central	12—Kenal-Cook Inlet	850	66.77%	423	33.23%	−427	−33.54%	1,273
South- central	13—Kodiak	215	30.85%	482	69.15%	267	38.31%	697
South- central	14—Aleutian Islands	119	35.95%	212	64.05%	93	28.10%	331
South- central	Absentee	522	63.12%	305	36.88%	−217	−26.24%	827
SOUTHCENTRAL TOTAL		15,147	75.73%	4,855	24.27%	−10,292	−51.45%	20,002
Central	15—Bristol Bay	209	53.73%	180	46.27%	−29	−7.46%	389
Central	16—Bethel	115	32.12%	243	67.88%	128	35.75%	358
Central	17—Kuskokwim	144	37.11%	244	62.89%	100	25.77%	388
Central	18—Yukon-Koyukuk	154	25.25%	456	74.75%	302	49.51%	610
Central	19—Fairbanks Northstar	1,850	30.56%	4,204	69.44%	2,354	38.88%	6,054
Central	20—Upper Yukon	74	23.95%	235	76.05%	161	52.10%	309
Central	Absentee	125	29.21%	303	70.79%	178	41.59%	428
CENTRAL TOTAL		2,671	31.29%	5,865	68.71%	3,194	37.42%	8,536
North- western	21—Barrow	42	15.91%	222	84.09%	180	68.18%	264
North- western	22—Kobuk	129	27.45%	341	72.55%	212	45.11%	470
North- western	23—Nome	695	52.73%	623	47.27%	−72	−5.46%	1,318
North- western	24—Wade Hampton	77	37.56%	128	62.44%	51	24.88%	205
North- western	Absentee	8	20.00%	32	80.00%	24	60.00%	40
NORTHWESTERN TOTAL		951	41.40%	1,346	58.60%	395	17.20%	2,297
STATEWIDE TOTAL		18,865	44.04%	23,972	55.96%	5,107	11.92%	42,837

== See also ==
- List of Alaska ballot measures
