= List of Alaska ballot measures =

Alaska is a non-contiguous U.S. state on the northwest extremity of North America. Alaska was purchased by the United States in 1867, however, it did not become an incorporated territory of the United States until 1912.

A ballot measure can be created by either citizens or the legislature. Additionally, any constitutional amendments to the Constitution of Alaska requires a supermajority of the legislature's support and a simple majority of voters' support. Additionally, the constitution mandates that a referendum must be held every ten years on whether to hold a constitutional convention.

Alaska is one of two states that uses a ranked-choice voting system. The system was first implemented in the nonpartisan blanket primary for the 2022 special election for Alaska's at-large congressional district. In 2024, a measure to repeal the system narrowly failed.

As of 2024, a total of 212 measures have appeared on the ballot. 60 of them have failed and 152 have passed.

== Background ==
The Constitution of Alaska, itself ratified by a vote of the people in 1956, outlined specific guidelines for ballot measures in Article XI, stating that "the people may propose and enact laws by the initiative, and approve or reject acts of the legislature by the referendum." Congress approved statehood in 1958 and when Alaska formally entered the union in 1959, it became the 20th state to have a system of direct voting.

In 2004, the Alaskan Legislature took steps to limit the number of measures that could appear on the ballot each year. The new rules required that measures initiatives and referendums receive signatures from three-quarters of Alaska's legislative districts and increased the total number of signatures required to a tenth of voters in the most recent election.

In 2020, Alaska became the second state, after Maine, in the nation to adopt a ranked-choice voting system when Ballot Measure 2 passed by less than 4,000 votes. Implementation of this system was postponed while state courts processed several legal challenges, but the Alaska Supreme Court upheld the measure in January 2022. The system was first used in the 2022 special election primary. In 2024, a measure to repeal the system was held but failed by a margin of less than 700 votes.

== Types of ballot measures ==
=== Citizen-initiated ===
There are two types of citizen-initiated ballot measures in Alaska. Both types must be proposed by a three-member committee of citizens and receive the qualifying amount of signatures within a year of the committee proposing the measure.

- Initiatives are measures placed on the ballot in order to introduce and enact a new law without it going through the legislature. Initiatives may not be used to allocate funding, create new courts, or modify the jurisdiction of existing courts. If the state passes a law substantially similar to proposed initiatives, the petition will automatically be rendered void.
- Referendums are measures placed on the ballot in order to approve or reject an action taken by the state legislature. Referendums may not be used to allocate funding or modify laws necessary "for the immediate preservation of the public peace, health, or safety" (as determined by the Lieutenant Governor of Alaska).

=== Legislature-initiated ===
There are two types of legislature-initiated ballot measures in Alaska.

- Bond propositions are measures placed on the ballot to create general obligation bonds. The Constitution of Alaska requires that these bonds be ratified by a simple majority of voters after passing the legislature.
- Constitutional amendments are measures placed on the ballot to modify the Constitution of Alaska. Amendments to the constitution must receive a supermajority of the legislature's support and a simple majority of voters' support. Additionally, the Constitution of Alaska requires a referendum be held every ten years on whether to hold a constitutional convention.

== 1960–1999 ==
=== 1960 ===
Ballot Measures from 1960
Measure Name	Description	Outcome	Yes Votes	No Votes	Ref(s)
Initiative No. 1	A measure moving the Alaskan capital from Juneau to a location in the Cook Inlet area	Failed	18,865 (44.04%)	23,972 (55.96%)	
Bonding Proposition 1	A measure providing $9,000,000 in funding to construct state office buildings in Anchorage and Fairbanks (equivalent to $98,000,000 in 2025)	Failed	20,778 (41.57%)	29,206 (58.43%)	
Bonding Proposition 2	A measure providing $23,000,000 in funding to construct and maintain a ferry and road system in the state (equivalent to $250,000,000 in 2025)	Passed	27,197 (52.32%)	24,779 (47.68%)	
Bonding Proposition 3	A measure providing $1,500,000 in funding for vocational education programs (equivalent to $16,000,000 in 2025)	Passed	32,494 (63.94%)	18,327 (36.06%)	
Bonding Proposition 4	A measure providing $2,000,000 in funding to the University of Alaska (equivalent to $22,000,000 in 2025)	Passed	37,085 (72.92%)	14,640 (27.08%)	
Bonding Proposition 5	A measure providing $2,500,000 in funding for the construction and maintenance of new hospitals (equivalent to $27,000,000 in 2025)	Passed	37,852 (73.33%)	13,770 (26.67%)	
Bonding Proposition 6	A measure providing $1,500,000 in funding for airfields in rural parts of the state (equivalent to $16,000,000 in 2025)	Passed	33,800 (66.58%)	16,969 (33.42%)	

=== 1962 ===
Ballot Measures from 1962
Measure Name	Description	Outcome	Yes Votes	No Votes	Ref(s)
Initiative No. 1	A measure moving the Alaskan capital from Juneau to a location in Western Alaska within thirty miles of Anchorage	Failed	26,542 (45.09%)	32,325 (54.91%)	
Bonding Proposition 1	A measure providing $5,950,000 in funding for new buildings at the University of Alaska (equivalent to $63,000,000 in 2025)	Passed	42,747 (76.07%)	13,447 (23.93%)	
Bonding Proposition 2	A measure providing $5,000,000 in funding for the construction of new schools (equivalent to $53,000,000 in 2025)	Passed	39,117 (70.58%)	16,306 (29.42%)	
Bonding Proposition 3	A measure providing $4,175,000 in funding for the construction and maintenance of rural airports (equivalent to $44,000,000 in 2025)	Passed	32,606 (59.18%)	22,492 (40.82%)	
Bonding Proposition 4	A measure providing $2,200,000 in funding for the construction of vocational schools (equivalent to $23,000,000 in 2025)	Passed	33,374 (60.98%)	21,356 (39.02%)	

=== 1964 ===
Ballot Measures from 1964
Measure Name	Description	Outcome	Yes Votes	No Votes	Ref(s)
Bonding Proposition 1	A measure providing $2,000,000 in funding for the construction of assisted living residences (equivalent to $21,000,000 in 2025)	Passed	46,970 (72.72%)	17,616 (27.28%)	
Bonding Proposition 2	A measure providing $5,000,000 in funding for the construction of new health and welfare facilities (equivalent to $52,000,000 in 2025)	Passed	47,099 (73.17%)	17,274 (26.83%)	

=== 1966 ===
Ballot Measures from 1966
Measure Name	Description	Outcome	Yes Votes	No Votes	Ref(s)
Senate Joint Resolution 1	A measure allowing the state legislature to reduce the residency requirement to vote in presidential elections	Passed	36,667 (74.75%)	12,383 (25.25%)	
Bonding Proposition 1	A measure providing $900,000 in funding for outdoor recreation construction (equivalent to $9,000,000 in 2025)	Passed	41,242 (66.63%)	20,655 (33.37%)	
Bonding Proposition 2	A measure providing $2,285,000 in funding for the construction of new schools (equivalent to $23,000,000 in 2025)	Passed	50,532 (80.34%)	12,367 (19.66%)	
Bonding Proposition 3	A measure providing $15,500,000 in funding for the construction of new ferries (equivalent to $154,000,000 in 2025)	Passed	36,518 (60.12%)	24,225 (39.88%)	
Bonding Proposition 4	A measure providing $16,900,000 in funding for the construction of new university buildings (equivalent to $168,000,000 in 2025)	Passed	43,674 (71.09%)	17,758 (28.91%)	
Bonding Proposition 5	A measure providing $10,500,000 in funding for the construction of a state highway system (equivalent to $104,000,000 in 2025)	Passed	49,336 (78.08%)	13,852 (21.92%)	
Bonding Proposition 6	A measure providing $11,500,000 in funding for the construction of new airports (equivalent to $114,000,000 in 2025)	Passed	41,146 (66.57%)	20,665 (33.43%)	
Bonding Proposition 7	A measure providing $2,285,000 for the construction of new regional high schools (equivalent to $23,000,000 in 2025)	Passed	49,007 (77.68%)	14,084 (22.32%)	

=== 1968 ===
Ballot Measures from 1968
Measure Name	Description	Outcome	Yes Votes	No Votes	Ref(s)
Constitutional Amendment No. 1	A measure establishing a judicial commission to set guidelines on eligibility for practicing law	Passed	32,481 (71.70%)	12,823 (28.30%)	
Constitutional Amendment No. 2	A measure establishing that members of the judicial commission may be financially compensated for their work there	Passed	27,156 (60.30%)	17,467 (39.70%)	
Referendum Relating to Voter Registration	A measure establishing a system of pre-registration for Alaskan voters.	Passed	37,152 (51.29%)	35,278 (48.71%)	
Bonding Proposition 1	A measure providing $2,000,000 in funding for the construction of assisted living residences in the southcentral region (equivalent to $19,000,000 in 2025)	Passed	48,992 (64.12%)	27,417 (35.88%)	
Bonding Proposition 2	A measure providing $11,200,000 in funding for the construction of a state highway system (equivalent to $104,000,000 in 2025)	Passed	60,782 (78.93%)	16,225 (21.07%)	
Bonding Proposition 3	A measure providing $1,200,000 in funding for the construction of new hospitals (equivalent to $11,000,000 in 2025)	Passed	56,272 (74.14%)	19,631 (25.86%)	
Bonding Proposition 4	A measure providing $8,800,000 in funding for the construction of new airports (equivalent to $81,000,000 in 2025)	Passed	54,330 (71.60%)	21,519 (28.40%)	
Bonding Proposition 5	A measure providing $10,000,000 in funding for the construction of new schools (equivalent to $93,000,000 in 2025)	Passed	61,619 (79.70%)	15,661 (20.30%)	
Bonding Proposition 6	A measure providing $8,500,000 in funding for the construction of new university buildings (equivalent to $79,000,000 in 2025)	Passed	50,741 (66.83%)	25,190 (33.17%)	
Bonding Proposition 7	A measure providing $18,000,000 in funding for the construction of ferries (equivalent to $167,000,000 in 2025)	Failed	35,549 (47.27%)	39,655 (52.73%)	
Bonding Proposition 8	A measure providing $3,000,000 in funding for the construction of new fish hatcheries (equivalent to $28,000,000 in 2025)	Passed	49,558 (65.04%)	26,638 (34.96%)	

=== 1970 ===
Ballot Measures from 1970
Measure Name	Description	Outcome	Yes Votes	No Votes	Ref(s)
Constitutional Amendment No. 1	An amendment lowering the voting age to eighteen years old	Passed	36,590 (53.96%)	31,216 (46.04%)	
Constitutional Amendment No. 2	An amendment eliminating the ability to read English as a voting requirement	Passed	34,079 (51.13%)	32,578 (48.87%)	
Constitutional Amendment No. 3	An amendment renaming the Secretary of State to the Lieutenant Governor	Passed	46,102 (71.05%)	18,781 (28.95%)	
Constitutional Amendment No. 4	An amendment requiring the position of Chief Justice be elected by the other justices on the Alaska Supreme Court	Passed	44,055 (69.23%)	19,583 (30.77%)	
Constitutional Amendment No. 5	An amendment requiring that the administrator of the Alaskan court system be appointed by the Alaska Supreme Court	Passed	43,462 (69.97%)	18,651 (30.03%)	
Referendum Relating to Constitutional Convention	A referendum calling for a Constitutional convention	Passed	34,911 (50.32%)	34,472 (49.68%)	
Bonding Proposition 1	A measure providing $20,300,000 in funding for the construction of schools	Passed	61,528 (79.53%)	15,835 (20.47%)	
Bonding Proposition 2	A measure providing $3,000,000 in funding for the construction of housing in remote areas	Passed	45,137 (59.14%)	31,188 (40.86%)	
Bonding Proposition 3	A measure providing $2,300,00 in funding for the construction of recreational facilities	Passed	50,272 (66.56%)	25,256 (33.44%)	
Bonding Proposition 4	A measure providing $29,200,000 for the construction of new highways	Passed	61,010 (79.58%)	15,658 (20.42%)	
Bonding Proposition 5	A measure providing $8,600,000 in funding for the construction of new health and welfare correctional facilities	Passed	52,977 (69.71%)	23,016 (30.29%)	
Bonding Proposition 6	A measure providing $5,600,000 in funding for the construction of new health and medical facilities	Passed	57,358 (77.14%)	17,001 (22.86%)	
Bonding Proposition 7	A measure providing $11,000,000 in funding for the construction of new wastewater systems	Passed	57,380 (75.10%)	19,024 (25.90%)	
Bonding Proposition 8	A measure providing $5,500,000 in funding for highway maintenance	Passed	56,540 (74.56%)	19,287 (25.44%)	
Bonding Proposition 9	A measure providing $10,000,000 in funding for the construction of new airports	Passed	50,964 (69.96%)	21,887 (30.04%)	
Bonding Proposition 10	A measure providing $21,000,000 in funding for the construction of ferries	Passed	42,901 (58.69%)	30,193 (41.31%)	
Bonding Proposition 11	A measure providing $29,700,000 in funding for construction relating to the University of Alaska	Passed	51,864 (70.49%)	21,710 (29.51%)	

=== 1972 ===
Ballot Measures from 1972
Measure Name	Description	Outcome	Yes Votes	No Votes	Ref(s)
Amendment 1	An amendment requiring voters maintain residency in Alaska for at least one year before being eligible to vote	Passed	31,130 (60.01%)	20,745 (39.99%)	
Amendment 2	An amendment prohibiting discrimination on the basis of sex	Passed	43,281 (80.81%)	10,278 (19.19%)	
Amendment 3	An amendment providing a right to privacy to all residents of Alaska	Passed	45,539 (86.18%)	7,303 (13.82%)	
Amendment 4	An amendment reforming the structure of borough assemblies	Passed	30,132 (60.89%)	19,354 (39.11%)	
Amendment 5	An amendment affirming that no exclusive rights to fishing exist in Alaska	Passed	39,837 (78.73%)	10,761 (21.27%)	
Constitutional Convention	A measure calling for a constitutional convention	Failed	29,192 (65.49%)	55,389 (65.49%)	
Proposition 1	A measure providing $3,500,000 in funding for the construction of new hospitals	Passed	62,374 (67.41%)	30,159 (32.59%)	
Proposition 2	A measure providing $10,000,000 in funding for the construction of new highways	Passed	65,985 (71.04%)	26,899 (28.96%)	
Proposition 3	A measure providing $11,500,000 in funding for the construction of recreation centers	Failed	42,936 (46.84%)	48,730 (53.16%)	
Proposition 4	A measure providing $18,000,000 in funding for the construction of facilities at the University of Alaska	Passed	55,190 (59.78%)	37,130 (40.22%)	
Proposition 5	A measure providing $24,000,000 in funding for the construction of airports	Passed	57,413 (62.83%)	33,971 (37.17%)	
Proposition 6	A measure providing $16,000,000 in funding for the construction of state operated schools	Passed	59,942 (65.50%)	31,576 (34.50%)	
Proposition 7	A measure providing $3,500,000 in funding for flood control and small boat harbors	Passed	51,995 (56.70%)	39,708 (43.30%)	
Proposition 8	A measure providing $33,000,000 in funding for the construction of sewage systems	Passed	63,817 (68.92%)	28,777 (31.08%)	

=== 1973 ===
Ballot Measures from 1973
Measure Name	Description	Outcome	Yes Votes	No Votes	Ref(s)
Proposition 1	A measure providing $11,500,000 in funding for the construction of recreation and sports facilities	Failed	28,849 (42.40%)	39,187 (57.60%)	

=== 1974 ===
Ballot Measures from 1974
Measure Name	Description	Outcome	Yes Votes	No Votes	Ref(s)
Amendment 1	An amendment requiring that future constitutional amendments appear on general election ballots rather than primary election ballots	Passed	56,017 (73.30%)	20,403 (26.70%)	
Initiative 1	A measure to move the state capital from Juneau to an unspecified location in Western Alaska	Passed	46,659 (56.66%)	35,683 (43.34%)	
Initiative 2	A measure requiring candidates for statewide political office to disclose their personal finances	Passed	57,094 (71.15%)	23,151 (28.85%)	
Proposition 1	A measure providing $2,700,000 in funding for the construction of fire protection facilities	Passed	57,922 (62.85%)	34,230 (37.15%)	
Proposition 2	A measure providing $22,500,000 in funding for port facilities development	Passed	46,280 (50.68%)	45,046 (49.32%)	
Proposition 3	A measure providing $7,900,000 in funding for the construction of new library facilities	Passed	48,325 (52.78%)	43,240 (47.22%)	
Proposition 4	A measure providing $10,400,000 in funding for the construction of new airports	Passed	47,988 (52.45%)	43,511 (47.55%)	
Proposition 5	A measure providing $37,300,000 in funding for the construction of state transportation infrastructure	Passed	55,138 (60.14%)	36,545 (39.86%)	
Proposition 6	A measure providing $10,900,000 in funding for healthcare facilities	Passed	55,040 (60.17%)	36,427 (39.83%)	
Proposition 7	A measure providing $10,500,000 in funding for wildlife management and enforcement	Passed	53,944 (59.07%)	37,383 (40.93%)	
Proposition 8	A measure providing $7,515,000 in funding for assisted living facilities	Passed	58,307 (63.43%)	33,612 (36.57%)	
Proposition 9	A measure providing $40,337,000 in funding for the construction of schools in rural areas	Passed	59,327 (63.87%)	33,567 (36.13%)	
Proposition 10	A measure providing $39,500,00 in funding for improvements to the University of Alaska	Passed	54,445 (58.38%)	38,820 (41.62%)	

=== 1976 ===
Ballot Measures from 1976
Measure Name	Description	Outcome	Yes Votes	No Votes	Ref(s)
Referendum 1	A veto referendum to repeal a law which increased the salary and retirement benefits for certain government employees	Passed	41,736 (80.14%)	10,341 (19.86%)	
Capital Site Selection	A referendum selecting a new location for the state capital, with three listed options: Larson Lake, Mount Yenlo, and Willow	Passed	56,219 (53.26%) (Note: "Yes" votes indicate votes cast specifically for the winning location, Willow)	49,339 (46.74%) (Note: "No" votes indicate votes cast for the two losing locations. Larson Lake received 33,170 votes (31.42%) while Mount Yenlo received 16,169 votes (15.32%).)	
Proposition 1	An amendment giving the legislature a time limit to reconsider vetoed bills	Passed	71,829 (64.24%)	39,980 (35.76%)	
Proposition 2	An amendment establishing the Alaska Permanent Fund	Passed	75,588 (66.24%)	38,518 (33.76%)	
Proposition 3	An amendment requiring the legislature to approve sales of state-owned lands	Failed	46,652 (41.88%)	64,744 (58.12%)	
Proposition 4	An amendment allowing the state to provide scholarships and grants to students at private universities	Failed	54,636 (45.97%)	64,211 (54.03%)	
Proposition 5	A measure repealing a law which limited commercial fishing	Failed	44,304 (37.10%)	75,125 (62.90%)	
Proposition 6	An advisory question asking whether the legislature should combine into a unicameral legislature	Passed	58,782 (51.57%)	55,204 (48.43%)	
Proposition 7	A measure providing $7,100,000 in funding for firefighter training programs	Passed	60,628 (52.14%)	55,656 (47.86%)	
Proposition 8	A measure providing $59,290,000 in funding for the construction and maintenance of school facilities	Passed	66,165 (56.45%)	51,040 (43.55%)	
Proposition 9	A measure providing $6,600,000 in funding for new parks and recreation facilities	Passed	58,708 (50.66%)	57,186 (49.34%)	
Proposition 10	A measure providing $29,205,000 in funding for fish and game management	Passed	66,813 (57.44%)	49,513 (42.56%)	
Proposition 11	A measure providing $7,500,000 in funding for housing for the elderly	Passed	78,463 (66.08%)	40,273 (33.92%)	
Proposition 12	A measure providing $26,960,000 in funding for the University of Alaska	Failed	56,467 (47.35%)	62,793 (52.65%)	
Proposition 13	A measure providing $53,360,000 in funding for state transportation infrastructure	Passed	71,910 (60.38%)	47,189 (39.62%)	
Proposition 14	A measure providing $6,866,000 in funding for the construction of airports	Passed	62,475 (52.62%)	56,250 (47.38%)	
Proposition 15	A measure providing $10,630,000 in funding for the construction of new criminal justice facilities	Failed	35,598 (30.39%)	81,547 (69.61%)	
Proposition 16	A measure providing $31,000,000 in funding for new water supply and sewage systems	Passed	66,693 (56.41%)	51,528 (43.59%)	

=== 1978 ===
Ballot Measures from 1978
Measure Name	Description	Outcome	Yes Votes	No Votes	Ref(s)
Proposition 1	An advisory question asking whether legislative sessions should be standardized at 120 days	Passed	87,100 (74.96%)	29,093 (25.04%)	
Proposition 2	An amendment empowering the Governor with the ability to approve or disapprove aspects of the budget	Failed	48,078 (41.28%)	68,403 (58.72%)	
Proposition 3	A measure requiring the public approve all costs of moving the capital before any move takes place	Passed	69,414 (55.68%)	55,253 (44.32%)	
Proposition 4	A measure making all unappropriated land available for homesteading until a total of 30,000,000 acres were transferred	Passed	70,409 (55.92%)	55,511 (44.08%)	
Proposition 5	A measure requiring all aluminum drink containers sold in major municipalities have a refund value of at least ten cents	Failed	49,882 (39.84%)	75,337 (60.16%)	
Proposition 6	A measure providing $33,290,000 in funding for flood control and harbor projects	Passed	70,207 (58.33%)	50,156 (41.67%)	
Proposition 7	A measure providing $5,850,000 in funding for public parks and walking paths	Passed	63,455 (52.66%)	57,034 (47.34%)	
Proposition 8	A measure providing $25,000,000 in funding for healthcare facilities and assisted living homes	Passed	86,099 (71.07%)	35,054 (28.93%)	
Proposition 9	A measure providing $33,656,000 in funding for vocational training facilities and the University of Alaska	Passed	65,211 (52.97%)	57,896 (47.03%)	
Proposition 10	A measure providing $88,450,000 in funding for state transportation infrastructure	Passed	75,454 (61.32%)	47,600 (36.68%)	
Proposition 11	A measure providing $30,504,000 in funding for the construction of correctional facilities	Passed	61,071 (50.21%)	60,561 (49.79%)	
Proposition 12	A measure providing $26,965,000 in funding for the construction of new fisheries management facilities	Passed	68,128 (55.68%)	54,229 (44.32%)	
Proposition 13	A measure providing $3,654,000 in funding for new National Guard facilities	Failed	41,001 (34.52%)	77,789 (65.48%)	
Proposition 14	A measure providing $27,640,000 in funding for new water supply and sewage systems	Passed	68,746 (57.64%)	50,525 (42.36%)	
Proposition 15	A measure providing $966,000,000 in funding for the construction of a new state capital in Willow	Failed	31,491 (26.18%)	88,783 (73.82%)	

=== 1980 ===
Ballot Measures from 1980
Measure Name	Description	Outcome	Yes Votes	No Votes	Ref(s)
Statehood Commission Advisory Votes	An advisory question asking whether a commission should examine Alaska's relationship to the rest of the United States	Passed	46,705 (50.60%)	45,598 (49.40%)	
Proposition 1	An amendment empowering the state legislature to overrule regulations adopted by state agencies	Failed	58,808 (41.76%)	82,010 (58.24%)	
Proposition 2	An amendment allowing legislators to accept salary increases while in office	Failed	47,054 (32.06%)	99,705 (67.94%)	
Proposition 3	An amendment establishing a new procedure for the legislature to create committees	Failed	41,868 (29.05%)	102,270 (70.95%)	
Proposition 4	An amendment granting the legislature the power to make appointments to government boards and commissions	Failed	56,316 (41.16%)	80,506 (58.84%)	
Proposition 5	An amendment establishing a general stock ownership corporation in Alaska	Failed	72,072 (47.90%)	78,404 (52.10%)	
Bonding Proposition A	A measure providing $7,718,800 in funding for improvements to fisheries facilities	Passed	91,091 (60.15%)	60,342 (39.85%)	
Bonding Proposition B	A measure providing $33,000,000 in funding for water treatment and sewage facilities	Passed	84,650 (55.94%)	66,668 (44.06%)	
Bonding Proposition C	A measure providing $18,787,500 in funding for energy conservation and upgrades to state buildings	Failed	64,978 (43.56%)	84,187 (56.44%)	
Bonding Proposition D	A measure providing $28,350,000 in funding for the construction of new correctional facilities	Passed	77,816 (51.91%)	72,090 (48.09%)	
Bonding Proposition E	A measure providing $20,000,000 in funding for the construction of cultural facilities	Failed	62,545 (40.93%)	90,255 (59.07%)	
Bonding Proposition F	A measure providing $156,992,700 in funding for state transportation infrastructure	Passed	105,122 (68.33%)	48,726 (31.67%)	
Bonding Proposition G	A measure providing $63,651,000 in funding for educational facilities	Passed	86,958 (56.59%)	66,718 (43.41%)	

=== 1982 ===
Ballot Measures from 1982
Measure Name	Description	Outcome	Yes Votes	No Votes	Ref(s)
Bonding Proposition A	A measure providing $400,000,000 in funding for purchasing mortgages for veterans	Passed	118,874 (63.90%)	67,168 (36.10%)	
Measure 1	A measure calling for a constitutional convention	Failed	63,816 (37.07%)	108,319 (62.93%)	
Measure 2	A measure allowing the state to issue bonds paying for veteran's housing loans	Passed	111,463 (60.69%)	72,197 (39.31%)	
Measure 3	A measure modifying membership requirements for the Commission on Judicial Conduct	Passed	123,172 (69.75%)	53,424 (30.35%)	
Measure 4	A measure limiting appropriations to no more than $2.5 billion, adjusted for inflation and population yearly	Passed	110,669 (60.97%)	70,831 (39.03%)	
Measure 5	A measure claiming state ownership of all federal land in Alaska with limited exceptions for nature reserves and military property	Passed	137,633 (73.04%)	50,791 (26.96%)	
Measure 6	A measure prohibiting state funding of abortions in all situations except to save the life of the mother	Failed	77,829 (40.79%)	112,995 (59.21%)	
Measure 7	A measure prohibit the state from classifying hunters into identity categories	Failed	79,679 (41.62%)	111,770 (58.38%)	
Measure 8	A measure asking whether the population supported the state's intent to move the capital from Juneau to Willow	Failed	91,049 (47.14%)	102,083 (52.86%)	

=== 1983 ===
Ballot Measures from 1983
Measure Name	Description	Outcome	Yes Votes	No Votes	Ref(s)
Bonding Proposition A	A measure providing $500,000,000 in funding for purchasing mortgages for veterans	Passed	24,167 (74.57%)	8,243 (25.43%)	

=== 1984 ===
Ballot Measures from 1984
Measure Name	Description	Outcome	Yes Votes	No Votes	Ref(s)
Bonding Proposition A	A measure providing $700,000,000 in funding for purchasing mortgages for veterans	Passed	145,258 (73.07%)	53,548 (26.93%)	
Legislative Annulment of Regulations Amendment	An amendment allowing the legislature to overrule executive branch regulations	Failed	91,171 (48.06%)	98,551 (51.94%)	
Length of Legislative Sessions Amendment	An amendment requiring state legislature sessions take no more than 120 consecutive days	Passed	150,999 (76.61%)	46,099 (23.39%)	
Reduce Transportation Regulation Initiative	A measure establishing the Alaska Transportation Commission	Passed	116,891 (59.77%)	78,663 (40.23%)	

=== 1986 ===
Ballot Measures from 1986
Measure Name	Description	Outcome	Yes Votes	No Votes	Ref(s)
Measure 1 (August)	A measure acknowledging nuclear war as a threat to human existence and encouraging a nuclear weapons freeze	Passed	80,326 (58.44%)	57,125 (41.56%)	
Bonding Proposition A	A measure providing $600,000,000 in funding for purchasing mortgages for veterans	Passed	112,672 (65.45%)	59,482 (34.55%)	
Measure 1 (November)	A measure allowing the state to exceed fiscal limits provided it passes a vote of the people	Passed	119,775 (71.01%)	48,909 (28.99%)	
Measure 2	A measure providing the legislature to overturn executive branch actions	Failed	65,176 (40.87%)	94,299 (59.13%)	
Measure 3	An advisory question asking whether the state should adopt a pension bonus for elderly pensioners	Passed	99,222 (60.13%)	65,789 (39.87%)	

=== 1988 ===
Ballot Measures from 1988
Measure Name	Description	Outcome	Yes Votes	No Votes	Ref(s)
Measure 1	An amendment granting Alaskan residents preference over non-residents	Passed	162,997 (83.74%)	31,650 (16.26%)	
Measure 2	A measure preventing excessive lawsuit damages in civil lawsuits	Passed	138,511 (71.87%)	54,206 (28.13%)	
Measure 3	A measure establishing a state community college system	Failed	83,472 (44.35%)	104,719 (55.65%)	

=== 1990 ===
Ballot Measures from 1990
Measure Name	Description	Outcome	Yes Votes	No Votes	Ref(s)
Measure 1 (August)	A measure mandating that the Alaska Railroad only operate within state borders	Failed	31,612 (22.76%)	107,269 (77.24%)	
Measure 2 (August)	A measure creating an Alaska Gambling Board	Failed	50,446 (35.71%)	90,827 (64.29%)	
Measure 1 (November)	A measure creating a budget reserve fund, funded with money from mineral revenue lawsuits	Passed	124,280 (66.25%)	63,307 (33.75%)	
Measure 2 (November)	A measure criminalizing marijuana possession	Passed	105,263 (54.29%)	88,644 (45.71%)	

=== 1992 ===
Ballot Measures from 1992
Measure Name	Description	Outcome	Yes Votes	No Votes	Ref(s)
Constitutional Convention Question	A measure calling for a constitutional convention	Failed	84,929 (37.30%)	142,735 (62.70%)	

=== 1994 ===
Ballot Measures from 1994
Measure Name	Description	Outcome	Yes Votes	No Votes	Ref(s)
Measure 1	An amendment clarifying that the state government may not infringe people's right to bear arms	Passed	153,300 (72.68%)	57,636 (27.32%)	
Measure 2	An amendment adding additional rights for victims of crime, including fair treatment, access to information, and ability to view court proceedings	Passed	178,858 (86.61%)	27,641 (13.39%)	
Measure 3	A measure moving the state capital from Juneau to Wasilla	Failed	96,398 (45.33%)	116,277 (54.67%)	
Measure 4	A measure prohibiting candidates for the U.S. Senate and House from being listed on the ballot if they have served more than three terms	Passed (Note: Would not take effect until 24 other states adopt similar ban)	126,960 (62.97%)	74,658 (37.03%)	
Measure 5	A measure requiring a vote of the people and public disclosure of information before the state may move the capital or legislature	Passed	159,781 (77.40%)	46,665 (22.60%)	

=== 1996 ===
Ballot Measures from 1996
Measure Name	Description	Outcome	Yes Votes	No Votes	Ref(s)
Measure 1	An amendment establishing a procedure for any change to the Alaska Statehood Act	Passed	157,936 (68.96%)	71,082 (31.04%)	
Measure 2	A measure prohibiting the hunting of certain wild animals on the same day as a scouting airplane flight	Passed	137,635 (58.49%)	97,690 (41.51%)	
Measure 3	A measure encouraging the United States Federal Government to adopt term limits for U.S. Senators and Representatives	Passed	123,167 (54.57%)	102,533 (45.43%)	

=== 1998 ===
Ballot Measures from 1998
Measure Name	Description	Outcome	Yes Votes	No Votes	Ref(s)
Measure 2	A measure defining marriage as taking place between one man and one woman	Passed (Note: Overturned in 2014 by Hamby v. Parnell)	152,965 (68.11%)	71,631 (31.89%)	
Measure 3	A measure reorganizing the state reapportionment board	Passed	110,768 (52.14%)	101,686 (47.86%)	
Measure 5	A measure banning billboards	Passed	160,922 (72.38%)	61,401 (27.62%)	
Measure 6	A measure requiring the state to only use English in all official documents and actions	Passed	153,107 (68.60%)	70,085 (31.40%)	
Measure 7	A measure allowing candidates for office to make term limits pledges	Passed	109,613 (50.20%)	108,731 (49.80%)	
Measure 8	A measure legalizing medical marijuana	Passed	131,586 (58.67%)	92,701 (41.33%)	
Measure 9	A measure prohibiting the use of snares in wolf trapping	Failed	83,224 (37.27%)	140,049 (62.73%)	

=== 1999 ===
Ballot Measures from 1999
Measure Name	Description	Outcome	Yes Votes	No Votes	Ref(s)
Special Advisory Vote	A measure advising the government to use excess Alaska Permanent Fund money to balance the budget	Failed	30,994 (16.75%)	153,996 (83.25%)	

== 2000–present ==
=== 2000 ===
Ballot Measures from 2000
Measure Name	Description	Outcome	Yes Votes	No Votes	Ref(s)
Measure 1	A measure prohibiting ballot initiatives relating to wildlife control	Failed	96,253 (34.90%)	179,552 (65.10%)	
Measure 2	An amendment requiring new amendments to the Alaska Constitution be limited to a single subject	Failed	114,310 (43.01%)	151,467 (56.99%)	
Measure 3	A measure transferring control of the Alaska Permanent Fund to a public corporation	Failed	72,419 (27.08%)	194,975 (72.92%)	
Measure 4	A measure prohibiting local municipalities from setting property taxes above a certain amount	Failed	80,276 (29.29%)	193,760 (70.71%)	
Measure 5	A measure removing penalties for adult marijuana use	Failed	114,321 (40.88%)	165,321 (59.12%)	
Measure 6	A veto referendum to repeal Senate Bill 267, which allowed hunters to shoot wolves on the same day they were spotted from an airplane	Passed	147,408 (53.55%)	127,883 (46.45%)	

=== 2002 ===
Ballot Measures from 2002
Measure Name	Description	Outcome	Yes Votes	No Votes	Ref(s)
Measure 1 (August)	A measure establishing a statewide ranked-choice voting system	Failed	39,666 (36.27%)	69,683 (63.73%)	
Bonding Proposition A	A measure providing $500,000,000 in funding for the purchasing of veteran's mortgages	Passed	156,158 (70.03%)	66,836 (29.97%)	
Bonding Proposition B	A measure providing $226,719,500 in funding for new transportation projects	Passed	150,404 (67.75%)	71,580 (32.25%)	
Bonding Proposition C	A measure providing $236,805,441 in funding for new educational and museum facilities	Passed	133,348 (59.60%)	90,386 (40.40%)	
Measure 1 (November)	A measure calling for a constitutional convention	Failed	60,217 (28.36%)	152,120 (71.64%)	
Measure 2	A measure moving the State Legislature from Juneau to the Matanuska-Susitna Borough	Failed	74,650 (32.77%)	153,127 (67.23%)	
Measure 3	A measure creating an Alaska Natural Gas Development Authority	Passed	138,353 (62.03%)	84,682 (37.97%)	

=== 2004 ===
Ballot Measures from 2004
Measure Name	Description	Outcome	Yes Votes	No Votes	Ref(s)
Measure 1	An amendment to change the process of signature gathering for ballot measures in Alaska	Passed	149,236 (51.66%)	139,642 (48.34%)	
Measure 2	A measure to legalize marijuana for adults older than 21.	Failed	134,647 (44.25%)	169,608 (55.75%)	
Measure 3	A measure banning bear baiting	Failed	130,648 (43.26%)	171,338 (56.74%)	
Measure 4	A measure requiring a special election if the position of United States Senator is vacated unexpectedly	Passed	165,017 (55.59%)	131,821 (44.41%)	

=== 2006 ===
Ballot Measures from 2006
Measure Name	Description	Outcome	Yes Votes	No Votes	Ref(s)
Measure 1 (August)	A measure decreasing the maximum campaign contribution and instituting strict reporting requirements	Passed (Note: Partially overturned by Thompson v. Hebdon)	113,130 (73.00%)	41,836 (27.00%)	
Measure 2 (August)	A measure raising taxes for cruise ships operating in Alaskan waters	Passed	81,963 (52.07%)	75,432 (47.93%)	
Measure 1 (November)	A measure decreasing the length of legislative sessions from 121 days to 90 day	Passed	117,675 (50.83%)	113,832 (49.17%)	
Measure 2 (November)	A measure creating a new tax on oil and gas-related properties	Failed	80,909 (34.60%)	152,889 (65.40%)	

=== 2007 ===
Measure Name	Description	Outcome	Yes Votes	No Votes	Ref(s)
Advisory Vote	An amendment forbidding the state from providing same-sex partners of public employees any form of employment or retirement benefit	Passed	60,896 (52.80%)	54,442 (47.20%)	

=== 2008 ===
Ballot Measures from 2008
Measure Name	Description	Outcome	Yes Votes	No Votes	Ref(s)
Measure 1	A measure establishing an Alaska Gaming Commission	Failed	73,463 (38.64%)	116,670 (61.36%)	
Measure 2	A measure prohibiting same day shooting of wolves and bears, with an emergency exemption for employees of the Alaska Department of Fish and Game to shoot and kill wolves and bears if the prey population is documented to be the lowest possible	Failed	85,619 (44.82%)	105,417 (55.18%)	
Measure 3	A measure creating a voluntary system of public funding for state election campaigns	Failed	67,162 (35.72%)	120,875 (64.28%)	
Measure 4 (Note: Also known as the "Alaska Clean Water Initiative")	A measure to create new water quality standards for mining operations	Failed	83,574 (43.59%)	108,138 (56.41%)	
Proposition A	A measure providing $315,050,000 in funding for new state transportation projects (equivalent to $471,000,000 in 2025)	Passed	187,961 (63.59%)	107,624 (36.41%)	

=== 2010 ===
Ballot Measures from 2010
Measure Name	Description	Outcome	Yes Votes	No Votes	Ref(s)
Measure 1 (August)	A measure banning the use of public funds for political campaigning or lobbying	Failed	62,909 (39.22%)	97,78 (60.78%)	
Measure 2	A measure requiring abortion providers to notify women's parents if they are under the age of 18	Passed	90,259 (55.06%)	70,746 (43.94%)	
Bonding Proposition A	A measure providing no more than $600,000,000 in funding for veteran's mortgage bonds	Passed	152,629 (61.98%)	93,624 (38.02%)	
Bonding Proposition B	A measure providing no more than $397,200,000 in funding for new libraries and educational facilities	Passed	147,980 (59.38%)	101,246 (40.62%)	
Measure 1 (November)	A measure expanding the Alaska State House of Representatives and Senate	Failed	99,490 (40.24%)	147,744 (59.76%)	

=== 2012 ===
Ballot Measures from 2012
Measure Name	Description	Outcome	Yes Votes	No Votes	Ref(s)
Ballot Measure 1	A measure to allow municipalities to raise the property tax exemption from $20,000 to $50,000 with the approval of a vote of the people	Passed	61,804 (50.13%)	61,495 (49.87%)	
Ballot Measure 2	A measure to establish a coastal management program under the Department of Commerce, Community, and Economic Development	Failed	46,678 (37.91%)	76,440 (62.09%)	
Bonding Proposition A	A measure providing no more than $453,499,200 in funding for state transportation projects	Passed	159,976 (58.13%)	115,222 (41.87%)	
Ballot Measure 1	A measure calling for a constitutional convention to amend the state constitution	Failed	90,079 (33.41%)	179,567 (66.59%)	

=== 2014 ===
Ballot Measures from 2014
Measure Name	Description	Outcome	Yes Votes	No Votes	Ref(s)
Ballot Measure 1	A veto referendum to repeal Senate Bill 21, which granted tax breaks to oil and gas companies and created a government board to monitor oil and gas investment.	Failed	89,608 (47.30%)	99,855 (52.70%)	
Ballot Measure 2	A measure to legalize marijuana for adults older than 21.	Passed	149,021 (53.23%)	130,924 (46.77%)	
Ballot Measure 3	A measure to raise the state minimum wage from $7.75 to $9.75 and to continue adjusting the minimum wage for inflation in the future.	Passed	194,654 (69.35%)	86,040 (30.65%)	
Ballot Measure 4	A measure to grant the legislature the ability to halt mining projects in Bristol Bay in order to protect wild salmon populations.	Passed	180,490 (56.94%)	93,212 (34.06%)	

=== 2016 ===
Ballot Measures from 2016
Measure Name	Description	Outcome	Yes Votes	No Votes	Ref(s)
Ballot Measure 1	A measure making voter registration automatic upon application for the annual permanent fund dividend.	Passed	197,702 (64.57%)	108,467 (35.43%)	
Ballot Measure 2	A constitutional amendment allowing the state to contract debt for postsecondary school loans.	Failed	130,867 (44.19%)	165,275 (55.81%)	

=== 2018 ===
Ballot Measures from 2018
Measure Name	Description	Outcome	Yes Votes	No Votes	Ref(s)
Ballot Measure 1	A measure creating salmon habitat protection standards and strengthening fishing permit requirements	Failed	103,836 (37.68%)	171,711 (67.32%)	

=== 2020 ===
Ballot Measures from 2020
Measure Name	Description	Outcome	Yes Votes	No Votes
Ballot Measure 1	A measure increasing taxes on oil and gas production on the North Slope	Failed	145,392 (42.14%)	199,667 (57.86%)
Ballot Measure 2	A measure creating an open primary, ranked-choice system for elections and strengthening campaign finance regulations	Passed	174,032 (50.55%)	170,251 (49.45%)

=== 2022 ===
Ballot Measures from 2022
Measure Name	Description	Outcome	Yes Votes	No Votes	Ref(s)
Ballot Measure 1	A measure calling for a constitutional convention to amend the state constitution	Failed	75,723 (29.55%)	180,529 (70.45%)	

=== 2024 ===
Measure name	Description	Outcome	Yes votes	No votes	Ref(s)
Ballot Measure 1	A measure increasing the state's minimum wage to $15 per hour and require employers to provide earned paid sick leave.	Passed	183,744 (57.98%)	133,162 (42.02%)	
Ballot Measure 2	A measure calling for the repeal of the top-four ranked-choice voting (RCV) system that was adopted in 2020.	Failed	160,124 (49.89%)	160,861 (50.11%)	

=== 2026 ===
Measure name	Description	Outcome	Yes votes	No votes	Ref(s)
Establish Campaign Contribution Limits for State and Local Elections Initiative	A measure seeking to establish new campaign contribution limits for campaigns for state and local office	Passed	92,783 (71.46%)	37,059 (28.54%)	
An Act Restoring Political Party Primaries, Ending Ranked-Choice General Elections, and Repealing Recent Campaign Finance Laws	A measure seeking to repeal Alaska's electoral system of ranked-choice voting, nonpartisan blanket primaries, and campaign disclosure rules which were enacted by Alaska Measure 2 from 2020, and return the state to partisan primaries, plurality voting, and make the Governor of Alaska run separately from the Lieutenant Governor of Alaska.				
Citizenship Voting Requirement Initiative	A measure seeking to establish that only United States citizens may be qualified voters in Alaska elections.				

== See also ==
- Elections in Alaska
