= Murray Pezim =

Canadian businessman

Murray Pezim ("the Pez")
- Born: December 29, 1920; Toronto, Ontario, Canada
- Died: November 12, 1998 (aged 77); Vancouver, British Columbia, Canada
- Occupations: Businessman, Sports Franchise Owner, Mining promoter
- Known for: Promoting gold mines on the Vancouver Stock Exchange

Murray Pezim (29 December 1920 – 12 November 1998), better known as "the Pez", was a Canadian businessman. He was a flamboyant mining promotor and stockbroker that promoted a number of gold investment over his lifetime. Later in his life he would buy the BC Lions Canadian Football League team, but the 1991–1992 season was one of the worse seasons in the history of the team to such extent that Pezim had to file for bankruptcy on 27 August 1992 and give up the ownership. Pezim was one of the most colorful and flamboyant "characters" selling shares in his companies on the Vancouver Stock Exchange.

== Early life and education ==
Pezim was born in Toronto, the son of Romanian Jewish immigrants. His father worked as a butcher. In a 1991 interview, Pezim described his father, Isadore Pezim, as a bootlegger. He was known as a hustler from his early age as he constantly sought to find ways to make more money. Pezim took to flattering the women who brought the meat to his father's butcher shop, recalling in 1991: "These poor, horrible-looking, downtrodden women who had been beaten by their husbands during the night would show up with six or eight cents to buy meat. I'd say, 'Mrs. O'Brien, you look so beautiful this morning. Let me just look at you.' They loved it. It was a bright moment in their dull lives. It got so they wouldn't buy meat from anyone but me. Sure it was phony, but so what? It made them feel better. This job also gave me insights into women. I've always liked women better than men. Most men are jerks".

In World War Two, he served in the Canadian Army as a truck driver in the British colony of Jamaica. In 1950, he entered the mining business by investing $12,000 he saved from his career in the meat business in a copper mining company and promptly lost it all. In 1953, he started to work as a stockbroker. In 1957, to impress a group of young women, Pezim dived into a pool with no water in it, and broke a number of his bones when he landed on the concrete. He defended jumping into an empty pool despite the injuries he suffered under the grounds: "I impressed 'em. It was worth it." Pezim worked as a stockbroker before turning to promoting gold mining companies listed on the Vancouver Stock Exchange (VSE).

== Mining promotion ==
In 1965, the Vancouver Stock Exchange (VSE) attracted much attention when Pyramid Mines, which was listed on the VSE, discovered a zinc deposit in the Northwest Territories, and which led to the stock of Pyramid Mines rising almost overnight from 0.25 cents per share to $22 per share. The success of Pyramid Mines made the VSE the premier stock exchange for listing mining companies in Canada, and led Pezim to move west to Vancouver. The journalist Geoff Castle described Pezim as "Howe Street’s promoter in chief" from 1965 onward. In the 1960s and 1970s, Pezim was active in promoting boxing fights in Vancouver. In 1970, he booked the boxer/gangster Marvin Elkind to fight against a much younger man with the expectation that Elkind would lose. Elkind described Pezim as a very flamboyant man whose outward bonhomie and good humor masked a cynical, manipulative and utterly selfish personality. Elkind confounded Pezim by winning the fight via knockout, which costed him a great deal of money as Pezim had bet against him.

In 1972 Pezim promoted a boxing match in Vancouver between George Chuvalo and Muhammad Ali, renewing the famous rivalry between Chuvalo and Ali who fought each other in two matches in 1965 and 1966. Ali had not unable to knock out Chuvalo in their two matches in the 1960s and won both matches by decision of the judges, which given Chuvalo the image of a boxer with a nearly superhuman ability to absorb the powerful blows inflicted by Ali's fists and still keep fighting. Ali made a great point of insisting that this time he would finally knock out Chuvalo and told the media in his usual colorful way that he would regard any victory less than a knockout as a defeat. To attract media attention and build hype around the match, Pezim arranged for a series of public relations stunts where Ali and Chuvalo would make a great show of insulting each other. Ali carried an ax with him at the events to symbolize his intention to finally take down the "Canadian Oak" as Chuvalo had been nicknamed. The Ali-Chuvalo fight which occurred on 1 May 1972 turned out to be anticlimactic as Ali dominated the match for all of 12 rounds and won by decision, disappointing fans who expected the Chuvalo-Ali fight to be like their matches in the 1960s. The 1972 Ali-Chuvalo fight lacked the ferocity and explosive energy of their 1965 and 1966 fights as Chuvalo was in decline as a boxer by the early 1970s while Ali was not. The Ali-Chuvalo fight was a disaster for Pezim as he sold only half of the 17, 465 seats at the Pacific Coliseum, which ended up costing him $100, 000. Pezim charged too much for the tickets to the Ali-Chuvalo fight, leading him to him selling only half the seats. Many boxing fans had anticipated Ali's victory as Chuvalo who had been Canada's top boxer in the 1950s-1960s had seen a marked decline in his fighting ability while Ali had not, which also contributed to the underwhelming public response. In January 1977, Pezim was charged with fraud for his stock market dealings, but was acquitted in 1979. The Canadian journalists David Cruise and Alison Griffiths in their 1991 book Fleecing the Lamb : the Inside Story of the Vancouver Stock Exchange described Pezim as an unscrupulous mining promoter who went about maniacally promoting penny stocks of questionable value and strongly implied that he routinely broke the law in his business deals on Howe Street. Pezim frequently visited Las Vegas casinos, and the comedian Joey Bishop gave him the nickname of "the Jewish Howard Hughes".

Three geologists Don McKinnon, John Larche and David Bell contracted Pezim to provide the capital for a gold mine. In 1980, Pezim allied himself with another VSE stockbroker Nell Dragovan, to create a company, Corona Resources, to develop a potential gold mine in northern Ontario at Hemlo Valley, committing $1.2 million in exchange for a 3% smelter royalty fee. Dragovan was a former secretary to Pezim whom Pezim lent $750, 000 while she herself invested $45, 000 of her own money. With the capital provided by Pezim and Dragovan, Bell began prospecting for gold in Hemlo Valley in November 1980. After encouraging drill results, Bell recommended that Corona buy two slots of land adjacent to the land it already owned. On 6 May 1981, LAC Minerals approached Corona with an offer to buy a share of the Hemlo Valley, which led to some sort of understanding being reached, though the precise arrangement was the subject of much ligationý. On 29 May 1981, a drilling result from hole 76 discovered a rich vein of gold. On 8 June 1981, Pezim became a director on the board of Corona and a vice president in August 1981. Before the drilling results from hole 76, the shares of Corona traded for about $1. 50 per share on the VSE, but as a result of Pezim's relentless efforts to promote the company, the price of Corona shares traded for $32 per share. Pezim founded at least 30 companies to speculate in Hemlo Valley while owning shares in another 30. Lola Williams, an American woman who owned a slot of land in Hemlo Valley was first approached by Corona to sell her land, and then by LAC Minerals.

The Hemlo Valley gold mine turned out to be one of the richest gold mines in Canada, which by itself increased Canada's gold production by 23%. Patrick Mars, a mining expert stated that Hemlo Valley was the world's biggest gold mine outside of the gold mines of the Witwatersrand in South Africa. The ownership of the Hemlo Valley mine became mired in lawsuits as Pezim in 1984 sued the LAC Minerals for breach of trust. Pezim argued that the way that LAC Minerals had outbid him for the land owned by Williams was a breach of trust in the agreement that LAC and Corona were not to compete. Pezim was deposed from the board of directors of Corona Resources, but in 1986 won a lawsuit against LAC Minerals for breach of trust and was awarded shares worth $154 million. In the summer of 1989, geologists working for Pezim discovered a gold deposit at Eskay Creek in northern British Columbia that proved to be worth billions once a mine was opened. The complex geology of northwestern British Columbia had led many to assume it would be impossible to profitably mine gold there, but Pezim persisted with having his geologists search for gold in the late 1980s, which led to the discovery of the Eskay Creek gold deposit in 1989. The announcement by Pezim in August 1989 of the discovery of the Eskay Creek gold deposit, which he estimated to be worth $1 billion, caused pandemonium on the floor of the VSE as trading that day broke all records. Pezim's announcement about Eskay Creek led to a feverish gold rush atmosphere on the VSE as millions poured into the exchange and TV crews were present everyday to record the rampant speculation.

Pezim was one of the most colorful and flamboyant "characters" selling shares in his companies on the Vancouver Stock Exchange. The journalist Bob Mackin wrote: " "The Pez" was the quintessential Howe Street wheeler-dealer known for smoking cigars, promoting his latest get-rich-quick scheme and womanizing. He flogged Vita Pez pep pills and audio tape greeting cards through Pezzaz Productions, a subsidiary of Pezamerica. He scored big with the 1981 Hemlo Valley and 1989 Eskay Creek gold discoveries." Pezim was married four times, and in 1991 was in a common law relationship with a 29-year old woman, Tammy Patrick. Pezim came to dominate the VSE as companies owned by him placed first, second, third, fourth and sixth among trading volume on the VSE in 1990. In 1990, the American journalist Greg Heberlein wrote: "Pezim's ego may be bigger than British Columbia, but he is a legend in more than just his own mind. His 1981 discovery of gold in Hemlo Valley, Ontario - the largest gold find ever in North America - is credited with saving the Vancouver Stock Exchange. He made a similarly huge discovery in British Columbia last year." Pezim defended the penny stocks in mining companies that he promoted and sold on the VSE, saying: "Take 500 shares at 40 cents. That's $2,000. The woman who bought those shares starts dreaming, `Maybe this is the one.' Those dreams are worth so much. What do you think lottery tickets do for people? You spend a couple bucks on the lottery, you get five nights of good dreams. These people can't afford IBM or General Motors." The average price of a stock on the VSE was 45 cents per share, which gave the VSE the image of a stock market accessible to ordinary people." As the VSE had the dubious reputation as "the scam capital of the world" as there was more fraud on the VSE than any other stock exchange in the world, the VSE was generally shunned by major investors and the majority who of those brought stocks on the VSE were ordinary people, who were more often than not swindled out of their money. About the frequent occurrence of fraud on the VSE, Pezim said all stock exchanges have "bad apples" and it was the responsibility of investors to exercise due diligence before buying shares on the VSE. The chairman of the VSE in 1990, Marty Reynolds stated that Pezim was a relentless promoter of his stocks, but added he was a "promoter, in the good sense of the word".

In 1990, Pezim had at least 50 companies listed on the VSE. The singer Kenny Colman said of Pezim: "Murray's a throwback, the last of Damon Runyan characters. He's a real Guys and Dolls character. If he wanted, he could have been a movie impresario, like Louis B. Mayer...That was Murray. Always promoting. It was never the money, it was always the action. When Murray's not in the action, he's dying." Pezim suffered from bipolar disorder, which explained much of his maniacal, hyperactive personality along with his obsessive need for media attention and extremely reckless behavior. The American anthropologist Emily Martin observed that CEOs with bipolar depression tend to be flamboyant characters known for seeking publicity along with rash decision-making. Martin listed Pierre Karl Péladeau, Richard Branson, and Ted Turner as other examples of CEOs with bipolar disorder.

== B.C. Lions owner ==
In 1989, Pezim purchased the BC Lions Canadian Football League team. Faced with the team going bankrupt, the premier of British Columbia, Bill Vander Zalm, was heard to say: "Time to bring in the Pez". The lawyer and politician Roy McMurtry who was serving as an adviser to Vander Zalm expressed some concern about the choice of Pezim as he was lobbying the province at the time to build a highway to the remote Eskay Creek gold deposit located in the mountains in northern-western British Columbia close to the American border. With the support of the provincial government, Pezim purchased the B.C. Lions on 7 September 1989 in order to keep the team in Vancouver. Pezim purchased the Lions at a discount for $1.7 million. Shortly after buying the Lions, Pezim caused controversy with his statement that planned to bring in a football team from the rival American National Football League, which would have threatened the business prospects of the Lions. His decision to buy the Lions was taken without consulting his management team, who were all opposed to the purchase. In 1990, he invited the American football player Doug Flutie to visit him at his house overlooking English Bay. Flutie wrote about his weekend as a guest of Pezim's: "Murray was a real character. He described himself publicity as "the world's greatest promoter". He said all kinds of crazy things and didn't care what people thought." Pezim signed a contract with Flutie agreeing to pay him US$350,000 annually for the next two years, which was a record salary for the CFL. In a reference to Vancouver's perennial rivalry with Toronto, Pezim called a press conference to announce that the Lions would crush the Toronto Argonauts with Flutie as their quarterback and win the Grey Cup.

On 17 December 1990, Pezim was banned by the B.C. Securities Commission from trading on the VSE for one year for insider trading, disclosure violations and misleading the exchange. Pezim did not release the news of the encouraging drilling results at Eskay Creek in 1989 in order to buy more shares in the Prime Resources and Calpine companies, which owned the rights to Eskay Creek, and then announced the news of the discovery of gold at Eskay Creek. The B.C. Securities Commission stated in a 1990 press release: "It is damaging to public confidence in the integrity of the securities market and prejudicial to the public interest when such significant market participants contravene basic and fundamental rules". Pezim owned so many companies on the VSE that the banning trade on him led to a significant decrease in the volume of trading. In 1991, Pezim was the subject of a sympathetic biography, The Pez: The Manic Life of the Ultimate Promoter by the journalist Jennifer Wells that first disclosed that Pezim suffered from manic-depression. In a review of Well's book the journalist Brian Fawcett wrote: "The Vancouver Stock Exchange is well known for being North America's fiscal approximation of Planet of the Apes, and Pezim has long been its alpha gorilla...Wells falls for Pezim's perpetually adolescent, wounded-entrepreneur persona. (She's not alone in this. The entire West Coast media have followed Pezim around over the last five years, doting on every silly note he plays as if he were the Pied Piper of Hamelin.) What she misses, in this oddly sympathetic portrait of a very strange man, is that Pezim is the perfect metaphor for the Vancouver Stock Exchange, and for all the stock exchanges around the world."

An October 1991 profile in Sports Illustrated described him as: "Up in the owner’s box at Vancouver’s B.C. Place stadium, during a Canadian Football League game involving the British Columbia Lions, an old fat guy is on his feet. On his hands are huge orange mittens that look like lion paws. He is waving them and growling like a lion in support of the Lions. Fans look up at him with a mixture of amusement, amazement, bewilderment and contempt. He is Murray Pezim, 70. He owns the Lions. He knows nothing about football. Never mind, says Pezim. ‘I’m a natural, kooky owner.'" The journalist Doug Looney noted that Pezim was one of Canada's richest men and one of the most flamboyant whose antics dominated the news in the Lower Mainland, saying: "Murray Pezim lives somewhere beyond Outrageous. To get there, drive to Crazed, keep going toward Bonkers via Berserk, then slow at Around the Bend and look for signs". Pezim was noted for operating in a chaotic and erratic style with major business decisions involving millions being made seemingly on whims. Pezim had his winter home at Paradise Valley in Arizona, where he was known for his lavish spending and disorganized style as he agreed to finance business schemes without even having a business plan being presented to him. Looney noted that Pezim surrounded himself with extremely attractive women dressed in revealing uniforms as his staff, which added to his mystique. Pezim seemed to have a good sense of humor as he enjoyed the celebrity roasts in Las Vegas where comedians such as Milton Berle and Don Rickles would joke at his expense as Pezim had an obsessive need for attention. Likewise, Pezim behaved in a very loud and flamboyant manner during his frequent visits to the casinos of Las Vegas. His summer home overlooking English Bay was widely viewed as one of the most lavish and luxurious in the entire Lower Mainland. He was described as being more interested in making deals than in actually making profits as he promoted various unlikely business schemes to which he committed millions.

Looney asked the question if Pezim was: "...a driving force in sports and finance in Canada and beyond or is he just a buffoon? Or both?” The answer was: "Depends. One high-level football source, who insists on anonymity because he fears Pezim’s power, says, ‘The man is a promoter, so all he has are his words—and none of them can be believed". The BC MPP Bill Reid stated: "If Murray hadn't stepped in and bought this team before last season, the Lions would have failed, and without Vancouver, there is no CFL. So all he did was save the league. He came to the party, became the messiah, and very few know." Former Lions coach Annis Stukus stated: "Murray isn't appreciated because, frankly, he has made too much money—and he's Jewish." His management of the Lions team was controversial as the Lions had a sustained losing streak during his tenure. Despite his claims to be one of Canada's richest men, Pezim was in debt. The decision by the B.C. Securities Commission to ban him from trading on the VSE in 1990 along with the heavy financial losses the B.C. Lions took under his management led to severe liquidity problems by the fall of 1991. Pezim treated the Lions very much like his mining companies, as something to be relentlessly promoted while neglecting to invest in the Lions. With the notable exception of Flutie, Pezim was unwilling to hire good players and did not seem to understand that importing one star American player such as Flutie was insufficient to win the Grey Cup. In 1992, the star quarterback of the Lions, Doug Flutie, became a free agent after his contract expired and he and Pezim were unable to agree to a new contract. In March 1992, the Lions lost Flutie to the Calgary Stampeders as the Stampeders owner Larry Ryckman made a more generous offer of one million U.S. dollars annually, which was more what Pezim was willing to pay to retain Flutie. The loss of Flutie caused attendance and viewership to decline. The 1991–1992 season was one of the worse seasons in the history of the B.C. Lions to such an extent that Pezim had to file for bankruptcy on 27 August 1992 and give up the ownership of the B.C. Lions to the Canadian Football League.

In 1996, he suffered a stroke that left him paralyzed on his left side, leaving him bedridden for the last years of his life. Pezim died of a heart attack in 1998. The journalist Clyde Woolman wrote that Pezim damaged the image of the VSE between the 1960s to the 1990s as she wrote: "The often swashbuckling, sometimes outrageous style of the likes of Nelson Skalbania and Murray Pezim sucked up newspaper print and did nothing to alter the exchange's image". In 1999, the VSE was shut down on the account of the high number of frauds on the exchange, which given the VSE the well deserved reputation as "the scam capital of the world".

== Books and articles ==
- Barnes, Michael (1998). Great Northern Ontario Mines. Renfrew: General Store Publishing House. ISBN 9781896182858.
- Cruise, David; Griffiths, Alison (1991). Fleecing the Lamb : the Inside Story of the Vancouver Stock Exchange. Toronto: Penguin Group. ISBN 9780140145854.
- Flutie, Doug; Lefko, Perry (1999). Flutie. Champaign: Sports Publishing Incorporated. ISBN 9781583820216.
- Humphreys, Adrian (2011). The Weasel: A Double Life in the Mob. Toronto: John Wiley & Sons. ISBN 978-0470964514.
- Kelly, Graham (2005). Greatest Grey Cups The Best of Canadian Football. Toronto: James Lorimer Limited, Publishers. ISBN 9781554390564.
- Martin, Emily (2009). Bipolar Expeditions Mania and Depression in American Culture. Princeton: Princeton University Press. ISBN 9780691141060.
- McMurtry, Roy (2013). Memoirs and Reflections. Toronto: University of Toronto Press. ISBN 9781442616622.
- Ryan, Joe (2013). Heavyweight Boxing in the 1970s The Great Fighters and Rivalries. Jefferson: McFarland, Incorporated, Publishers. ISBN 9780786492497.
- Woolman, Clyde (2023). Growing Up Canadian Canada and Its Youth Come of Age 1960-1980. Altona: FriesenPress. ISBN 9781039179493.
