= Kerr Sulphurets Mitchell =

Active mine exploration project in Canada

Coordinates: 56°31′N 130°16′W

Kerr-Sulphurets-Mitchell (KSM) is an active mine exploration project 65 km northwest of Stewart, British Columbia (1,545 km northwest of Vancouver, British Columbia). The property is 100% owned by Toronto-based Seabridge Gold. Denver-based royalty company Royal Gold owns a 2% net smelter return royalty on the mine. Since May 2011, the project has also been called Kerr-Sulphurets-Mitchell-Iron Cap due to the addition of significant reserves from the Iron Cap region.

Boundary between the KSM property and Pretium Resource's Snowfield-Brucejack project and the road connecting them to Barrick Gold's Eskay Creek mine. The large land impressions that can be seen running through the Kerr and Sulphurets properties are glaciers (Sulphurets Glacier, Mitchell Glacier), icefields and lakes (Brucejack Lake is to the right just outside the area shown).

When operational it will feature three open-pit mines, a processing plant and a tailings facility. It is the largest undeveloped gold deposit in Canada and one of the world's biggest copper-gold porphyry deposits. Though 2P reserves are significant (39 million ounces of gold, 214 million ounces of silver, 9.9 billion pounds of copper and 257 million pounds of molybdenum) they only represent about 65% of the mine's total resource of each metal. The mines have a 52-year mine life (up from the 37 year estimate in 2009) and in the first seven years gold production costs are estimated to have been $105/oz. Environmental/geological assessment was done by Rescan and Wardrop (other Rescan projects include Pueblo Viejo and Ekati). All of the proven reserves and 75% of the proven + probable reserves are in the Mitchell Valley. Although the area's pyritic gossans have been clearly visible for a while, mining has never been attempted before.

It neighbors Pretium Resources’ Snowfield project (previously owned by Silver Standard Resources). Snowfield has reserves of 25.9 million ounces for gold, 3 billion pounds for copper, 75.8 million ounces for silver and 258.3 million pounds for molybdenum. Barrick Gold's Eskay Creek Mine is 20 km northwest of KSM.

== History and background ==
The property was purchased by Seabridge Gold in 2000 from Placer Dome (currently Barrick Gold) and exploratory activity began in 2006. Since then exploration by Seabridge has added about 20 million ounces of gold resource.

A preliminary feasibility study released in May 2010 increased reserves by 61% for silver (133 million ounces), 42% for copper (7 billion pounds), 27% for gold (8.5 million ounces) and 22% for molybdenum; Most of the new reserves came from the Iron Cap portion of the property which wasn't part of previous development plans.

Exploration spending in British Columbia was $521 million in 2008 and 2009 combined with spending in 2009 being the "6th highest total in the last 20 years". Besides KSM there were 87 other significant exploration projects in BC that year (60% of the companies involved were based in BC).

In 2010 a comprehensive environmental assessment of the area was completed by Canada's ministry of environment. While the study was being done the Canadian Environmental Assessment Agency (CEAA) was undergoing a review of its own by the Supreme Court of Canada.

KSM is located near the headwaters of a tributary of the Unuk River, which flows into Behm Canal near Ketchikan. Seabridge unveiled its development plan during a public meeting in Ketchikan in October 2011 before a crowd of skeptical residents.

== Geology ==
The sulphurets zone has the lowest elevations while the highest elevations of the entire valley region are covered by glaciers. The main sulfides are pyrite and chalcopyrite and all mineralization came from processes occurring deep below the surface (hypogene). Quartz stockwork is the main mineralization type.

Kerr - Recognized as a porphyry copper deposit since 1987 (specifically a modified porphyry deposit with unique characteristics). A hydrothermal system generated by intrusion of monzonite, naturally upgraded mineral grades (caused by one of the many deformations occurring in its geological history). That deformation introduced new veins which consisted of a combination of sulfides occurring with minor chalcopyrite, bornite and quartz occurring with carbonate minerals and chlorite.

Sulphurets - This deposit is centered on the Sulphurets Thrust Fault where volcanic activity helped to form it (portions previously exposed to fracturing form the site's gold zone). Copper can be found within the Main Copper Zone and the Raewyn Copper-Gold Zone. Gold is found in its highest concentrations at the Breccia Gold Zone (up to 5.6 g/t in the K-feldspar hydrothermal breccias and up to 21.2 g/t in the siliceous breccias).

Currently (July 2011) it has 3 million ounces of inferred gold resource that Seabridge has an agenda to upgrade by 2012. At a depth between 42.9 m and 65.9 m, Sulphurets has a gold grade of 1.26 g/t (1.12 g/t beyond 79 m).

Mitchell - The deposit was previously exposed through erosion of the Mitchell Thrust Fault. Copper-gold mineralization occurs mostly in a zone 300 to 600 meters thick. Glacial melting increased exposure of the deposit.
