= Seabridge Gold =

Canadian mineral mining company

Seabridge Gold Inc.
- Formerly: Seabridge Resources, Dragoon Resources, Chopper Mines
- Type: Public
- Traded as: TSX: SEA AND NYSE: SA
- Industry: Mineral exploration
- Founded: 1979 as Chopper Mines Ltd.
- Headquarters: Toronto, Ontario, Canada
- Key people: Rudi P. Fronk, (Chairman and CEO, 1999-current); Ryan C. Hoel, (President and CEO), Greg J. Martin (Chief Financial Officer)
- Net income: ▼C$6.6 million (Q1-2026)
- Total assets: C$1,799 million (March 31, 2026)
- Total equity: C$1,202 million (March 31, 2026)
- Subsidiaries: KSM Mining Inc., Seabridge Gold (NWT) Inc., Seabridge Gold (Yukon) Inc., Seabridge Gold Corp., SnipGold Corp. and Snowstorm Exploration (LLC)
- Website: www.seabridgegold.com

Seabridge Gold is a Canadian company that is pursuing the development of the Kerr Sulphurets Mitchell ("KSM") gold-silver-molybdenum-copper mine in northwest British Columbia. Headquartered in Toronto, the company is listed on the Toronto Stock Exchange and the New York Stock Exchange. The company was founded in 1979 as a mining company but, in 1999, re-organized to pursue exploration and development of gold deposits with a new board of directors and new management team. Of the mineral properties acquired between 2000 and 2002, the KSM project emerged as its core asset. The project advanced through its preliminary feasibility study and received its environmental assessment approval in 2014. The Company has completed new development plans and is actively looking for a partner to co-develop the project. KSM is one of the world’s largest gold/copper projects as measured by mineral reserves and resources. Seabridge also owns several other mineral properties, including the Bronson Corridor Project in northwest BC, the Snowstorm project in Nevada and the 3 Aces project in Canada’s Yukon.

== Corporate history ==
The company was incorporated as Chopper Mines Incorporated on September 14, 1979, in Vancouver, British Columbia, Canada. It was listed on the Canadian Venture Exchange. It was renamed Dragoon Resources Ltd on November 9, 1984, and pursued exploration work on mineral properties, principally in British Columbia and Labrador. Between 1998 and 1999 the company underwent a major re-organization, with a new management to pursue gold and the company was renamed Seabridge Resources Ltd on May 20, 1998. Between 2000 and 2002 they acquired numerous exploratory gold projects in Canada and the U.S., including the KSM property in British Columbia and the Courageous Lake Project located in the Northwest Territories. On June 20, 2002, they adopted the name Seabridge Gold and moved its corporate headquarters to Toronto. The company became listed on the American Stock Exchange in 2004 and graduated from the TSX Venture Exchange to the Toronto Stock Exchange in 2008. Its stock had peaked in October 2007 based on the potential of its KSM holdings. In 2016, Seabridge acquired SnipGold Corp. (formerly Skyline Gold Corporation) in an all-stock deal valued at $10 million for its Bronson Corridor Project (formerly Iskut project) in northern British Columbia.

== Kerr Sulphurets Mitchell ==
Boundary between the KSM property and Pretium Resource's Snowfield-Brucejack project and the road connecting them to Barrick Gold's Eskay Creek mine (now closed).Glaciers/lakes are also visible in the KSM map

Located in north-western British Columbia, 65 kilometres (40 mi) north of Stewart in the Iskut-Stikine region and near the Alaska border, the KSM property consists of four deposits: Kerr, Sulphurets, Mitchell, and Iron Cap. Its 2010 Preliminary Feasibility Study, updated in 2011, reported a combined proven and probable reserves at 38.5 million ounces of gold, 214 million ounces of silver and 257 million pounds of molybdenum and 10 billion pounds of copper. The report estimated the open pit mine would have a startup cost of US$4.68 billion and a mine life of 52 years. It ranks among the largest known undeveloped gold deposits in the world. The property had been purchased by Seabridge in June 2001 from Placer Dome for 500,000 common shares, 5000 warrants (exercised in 2003) and royalty payments capped at C$4.5 million.

The project's environmental assessment application received provincial government approval in July 2014 and federal approval in December 2014. Despite the lack of development activity, a five-year extension on the approval was granted in 2018 and a second extension was requested in 2020, as the projected costs rose to $5.5 billion due to an alternative mine plan capturing higher grade copper than previously reported. The project design includes an exceptionally large tailings dam which has been vetted by an independent geotechnical review committee.

== Other holdings ==
The Courageous Lake exploration project was acquired in 2002 from Newmont Canada Limited and Total Resources $5.5 million plus a 2% net smelter return royalty. It is located 240 kilometres (150 mi) north of Yellowknife, Northwest Territories, Canada. Its 2012 preliminary feasibility study reported 6.5 million ounces of gold (proven and probable) over two deposits (Felsic-Ash-Tuff and Walsh Lake deposits) and projected a potential 15-year mine life. Initial resource for the Walsh Lake deposit was announced in early 2014 totalling 4.62 million tonnes grading 3.24 g/T and containing 482,000 ounces of gold, all inferred.

A 36-hole diamond drill program commenced in February, 2018 to test seven targets for mineralization similar to the Walsh Lake discovery. Two targets were found to have grade and size potential similar to Walsh Lake.

On June 3, 2026, Seabridge completed the spin-out of its 100% interest in the Courageous Lake Project into Valor Gold Corp. pursuant to a statutory plan or arrangement. Under the transaction, Seabridge shareholders received shares of Valor, which now owns and is advancing Courageous Lake Project as an independent public company listed on the TSX under the symbol "VGC".[18]

In December 2020 Seabridge acquired the Snowfield Property from Pretium Resources Inc. ("Pretivm"). The Snowfield Property hosts a large gold resource immediately adjacent to Seabridge's 100%-owned KSM gold-copper project in northeast British Columbia, Canada adding 25.9 million oz of M&I gold resources. The Company is in the process of updating the KSM preliminary feasibility study to incorporate Snowfield into the project design.

The Iskut Project was obtained with the closing of Seabridge's acquisition of SnipGold Corp. in June, 2016. The Iskut Project now knows as Bronson Corridor Project includes the former high grade gold Johnny Mountain Mine and the copper-gold Bronson Slope deposit.

The 2017 drill program confirmed the presence of a gold-bearing intermediate sulfidation epithermal system within the Quartz Rise lithocap. Subsequent work has found the potential for a large porphyry system below the lithocap which will be targeted in 2020 drilling. In conjunction with its exploration program, Seabridge is undertaking environmental work to carry out remediation programs to mitigate impacts of historical mining activity as well as community engagement.

Snowstorm Project was purchased in June 2017. Seabridge purchased a 100% interest in Snowstorm from PFR Gold Holdings (formerly Paulson Gold Holdings) for 700,000 Seabridge common shares and 500,000 common share purchase warrants exercisable for four years. Additional payments of $2.5 million are due on condition of exploration activities and $5 million upon delineation of additional gold resources. An initial drill program in 2019 has targeted a possible Getchell Trend type of high grade gold deposit.

In May 2020 Seabridge acquired the 3 Aces project in Canada’s Yukon for 300,000 Seabridge common shares, potential future cash payments totalling $2.25 million, and continuing royalty participation in the project by the previous owner. 3 Aces is a district scale, orogenic-gold project consisting of 1,536 claims covering approximately 350 km² located in a readily accessible part of southeastern Yukon. Historical work has identified a broad area of gold-in-soil extending more than 20 kilometers (12.4 miles) along strike and recent drilling in the Central Core Area has intersected high-grade, near surface gold mineralization. Exploration activities are planned at 3 Aces in 2021.
