= Southeast Alaska =

Region of Alaska

Coordinates: 57°34′48″N 135°29′14″W

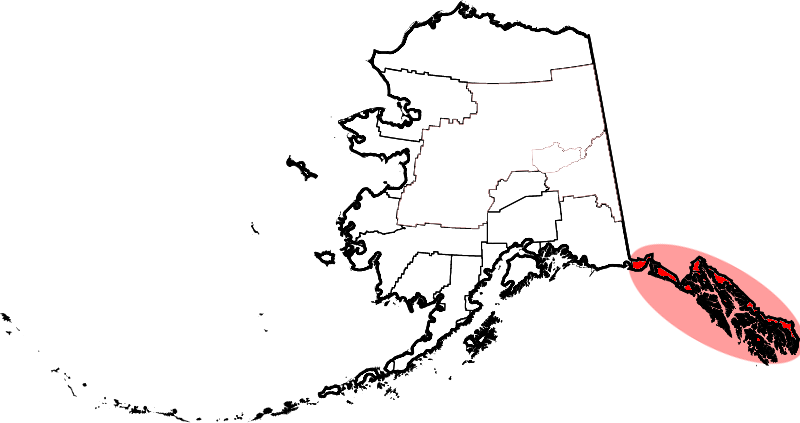
Southeast Alaska highlighted on a map

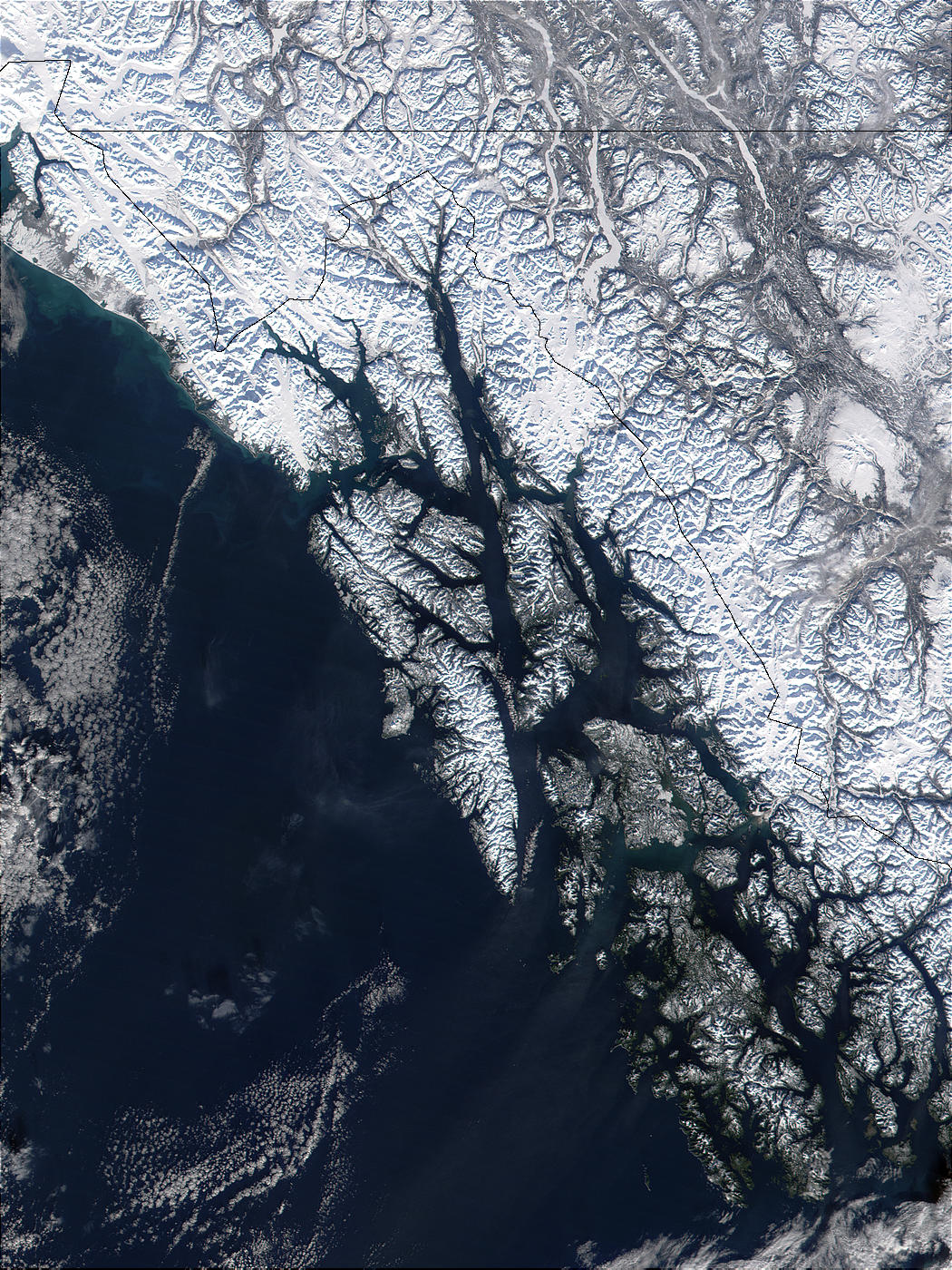
A MODIS photograph of Southeast Alaska, February 2002. Border lines with Yukon and British Columbia have been artificially added.

Southeast Alaska, often abbreviated to southeast or southeastern, and sometimes called the Alaska(n) panhandle, is the southeastern portion of the U.S. state of Alaska, bordered to the east and north by the northern half of the Canadian province of British Columbia (and a small part of Yukon). The majority of southeast Alaska is situated in Tlingit Aaní, much of which is part of the Tongass National Forest, the United States' largest national forest. In many places, the international border runs along the crest of the Boundary Ranges of the Coast Mountains (see Alaska boundary dispute). The region is noted for its scenery and mild, rainy climate.

The largest cities in the region are Juneau, Sitka, and Ketchikan. This region is also home to Hyder, the easternmost town in Alaska.

== Geography ==
Southeast Alaska has a land area of 35,138 square miles (91,010 km^{2}), comprising much of the Alexander Archipelago. The largest islands are, from North to South, Chichagof Island, Admiralty Island, Baranof Island, Kupreanof Island, Revillagigedo Island and Prince of Wales Island. Major bodies of water of southeast Alaska include Glacier Bay, Lynn Canal, Icy Strait, Chatham Strait, Stephens Passage, Frederick Sound, Sumner Strait, and Clarence Strait.

The archipelago is the northern terminus of the Inside Passage, a protected waterway of convoluted passages between islands and fjords, beginning in Puget Sound in Washington state. This was an important travel corridor for Tlingit, Haida, and Tsimshian Native peoples, as well as gold-rush era steamships. In modern times it is an important route for Alaska Marine Highway ferries as well as cruise ships.

== Demographics ==
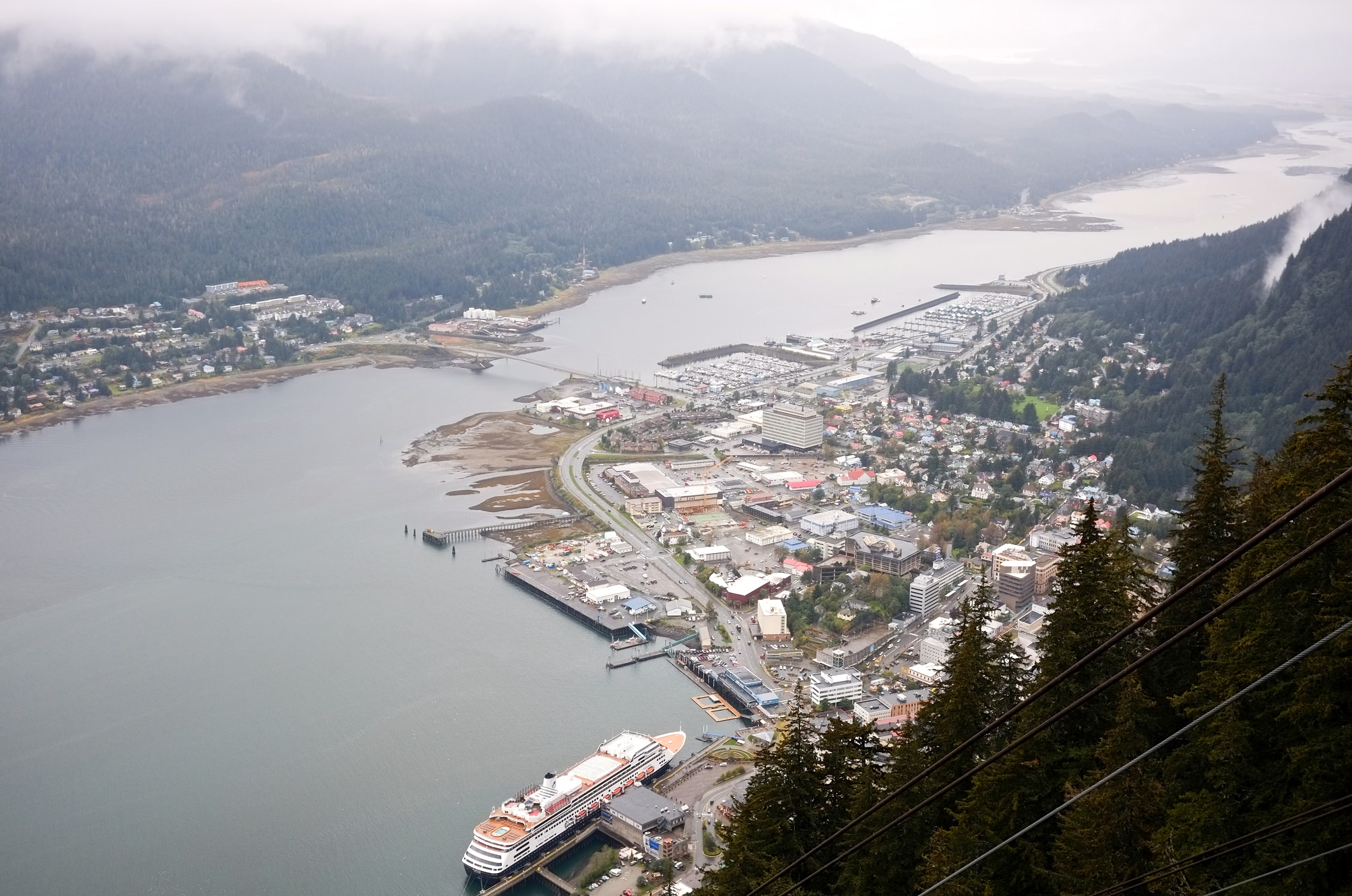
The City and Borough of Juneau, the most populous borough in southeast Alaska.

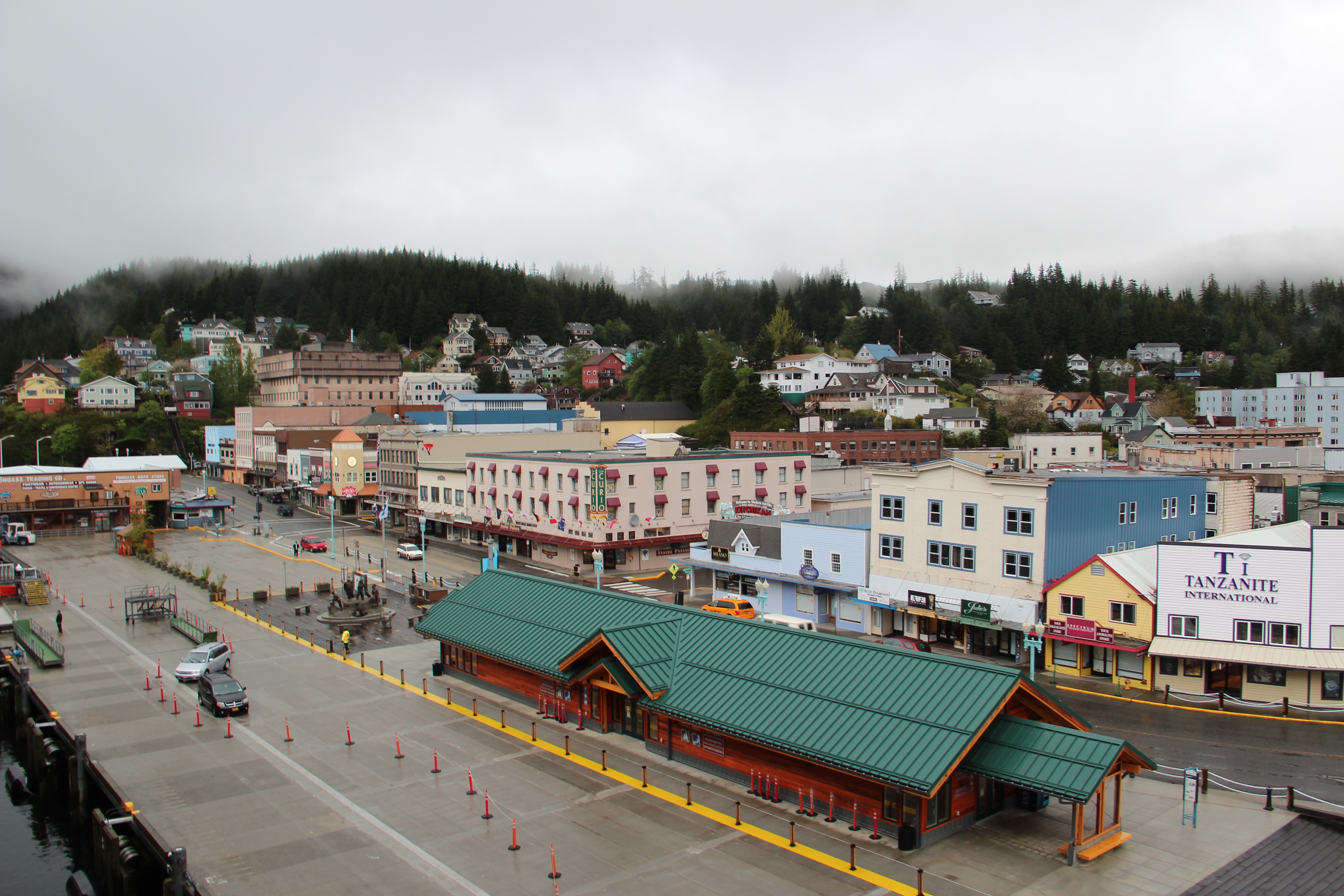
Ketchikan Gateway Borough, the second most populous borough in southeast Alaska.

Southeast Alaska includes seven entire boroughs and two census areas, in addition to the portion of the Yakutat Borough lying east of 141° West longitude. Although it has only 6.14 percent of Alaska's land area, it is larger than the state of Maine, and almost as large as the state of Indiana. The southeast Alaskan coast is roughly as long as the west coast of Canada.

The 2010 census population of southeast Alaska was 71,616 inhabitants, representing approximately 10% of the state's total population. About 45% of residents in the southeast Alaska region were concentrated in the city of Juneau, the state capital. As of 2018, the number of settlements in southeast Alaska that have a population of at least 1,000 people has grown to nine.

=== Boroughs ===
- Haines Borough
- Hoonah-Angoon Census Area
- Juneau Borough
- Ketchikan Gateway Borough
- Petersburg Borough
- Prince of Wales-Hyder Census Area
- Sitka Borough
- Skagway Borough
- Wrangell Borough
- Yakutat Borough (the part east of 141° W longitude; 12,506.53 km^{2} (4,828.80 sq mi), or about 63.12 percent of the borough)

=== Major cities and towns ===
Populations are taken from the 2020 census.

- Juneau - 32,255 inhabitants
- Sitka - 8,458 inhabitants
- Ketchikan - 8,192 inhabitants
- Petersburg - 3,043 inhabitants
- Wrangell - 2,127 inhabitants
- Haines - 1,657 inhabitants
- Metlakatla - 1,454 inhabitants
- Skagway - 1,240 inhabitants
- Craig - 1,036 inhabitants

== National protected areas ==
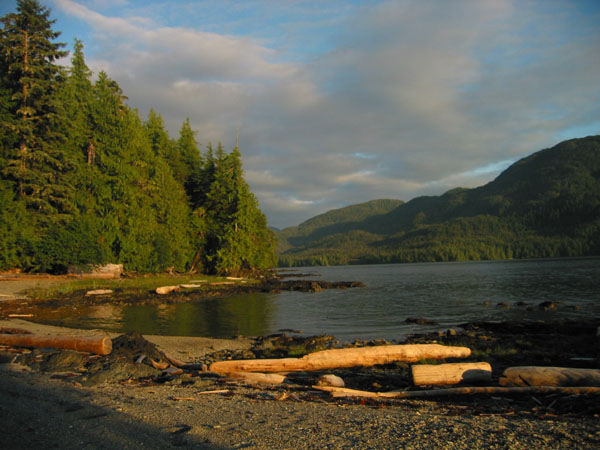
The Tongass National Forest, near Ketchikan

Southeast Alaska includes the Tongass National Forest (which manages Admiralty Island National Monument and Misty Fjords National Monument), Glacier Bay National Park, and Sitka National Historical Park. On August 20, 1902, President Theodore Roosevelt established the Alexander Archipelago Forest Reserve, which formed the heart of the Tongass National Forest that covers most of the region.

- Glacier Bay National Park and Preserve
- Klondike Gold Rush National Historical Park
- Sitka National Historical Park
- Wrangell–St. Elias National Park and Preserve (part, the most southeastern section only)
- Admiralty Island National Monument
- Misty Fjords National Monument

== Climate ==
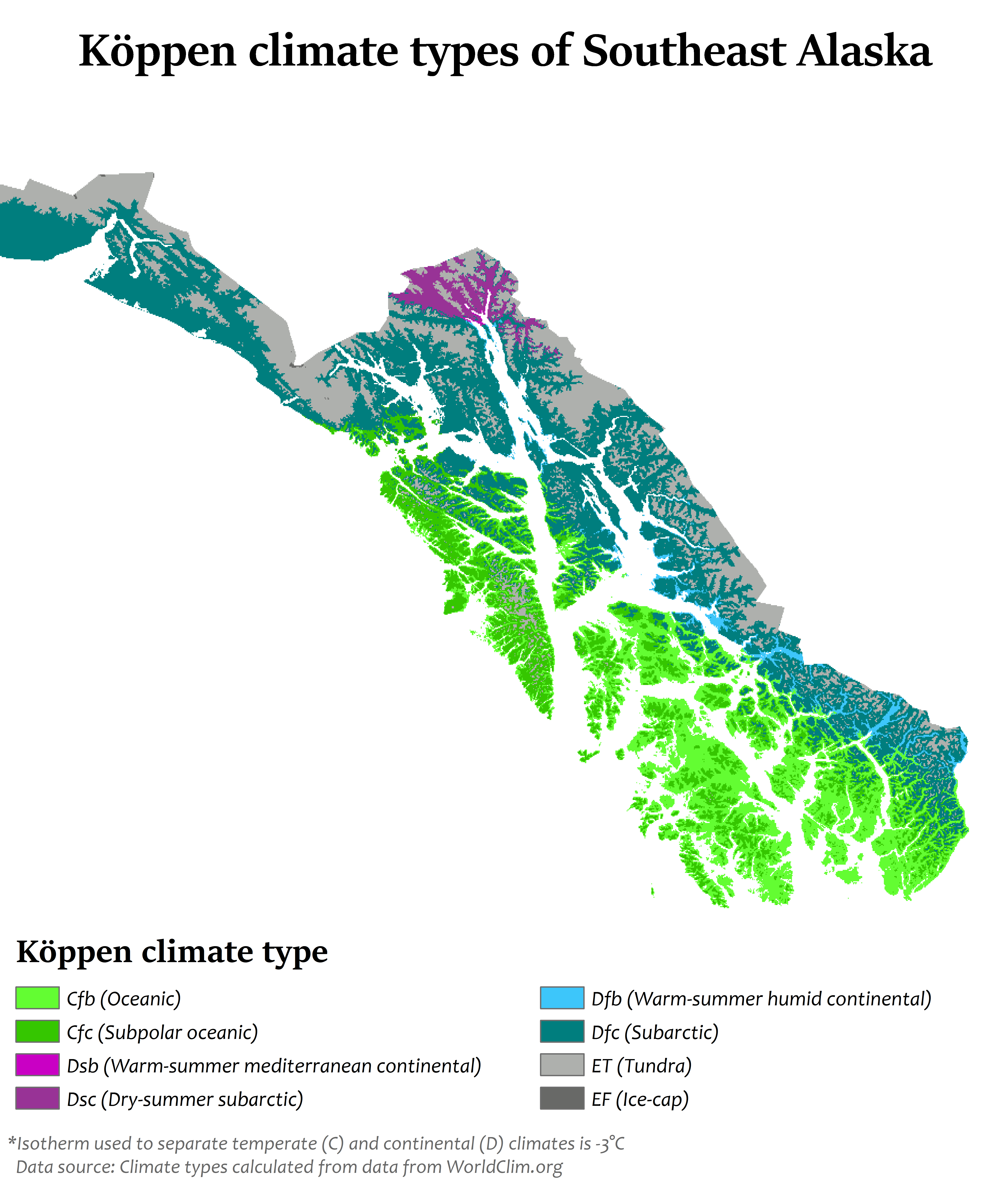
Köppen climate types in southeast Alaska.

The climate of southeast Alaska is dominated by a mid-latitude oceanic climate (Köppen Cfb) in the south, an oceanic, marine sub-polar climate (Köppen Cfc) in the central region around Juneau, and a subarctic climate (Köppen Dfc) to the far northwest and the interior highlands of the archipelago. Southeast Alaska is also the only region in Alaska where the average daytime high temperature is above freezing during the winter months, except for in the southern parts of the Aleutian Islands such as Unalaska.

== Ecology ==
Southeast Alaska is a temperate rain forest within the Pacific temperate rain forest zone, as classified by the World Wildlife Fund's ecoregion system, which extends from northern California to Prince William Sound. The most common tree species are sitka spruce and western hemlock.

Wildlife includes brown bears, black bears, endemic Alexander Archipelago wolf packs, Sitka black-tailed deer, humpback whales, orcas, five species of salmon, bald eagles, harlequin ducks, scoters, and marbled murrelets.

The Ecological Atlas of Southeast Alaska, published by Audubon Alaska in 2016, offers an overview of the region's landscape, birds, wildlife, human uses, climate change, and more, synthesizing data from agencies and a variety of other sources.

== Culture ==
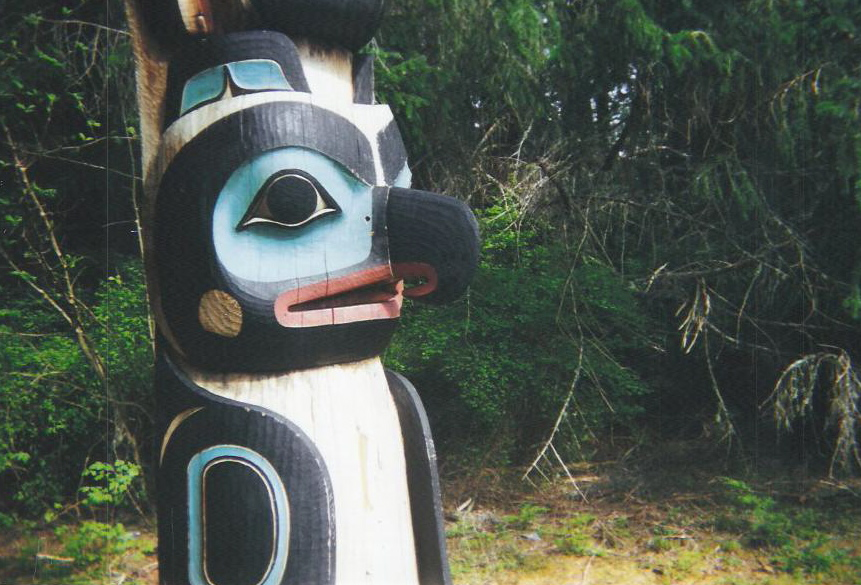
A totem pole at Sitka National Historical Park.

This area is the traditional homeland of the Tlingit, and home of a historic settling of Haida as well as a modern settlement of Tsimshian. The region is closely connected to Seattle and the American Pacific Northwest economically and culturally.

== Industry ==
Major industries in southeast Alaska include commercial fishing and tourism (primarily the cruise ship industry). The regional economic development organization Southeast Conference publishes an annual Southeast Alaska By the Numbers which summarizes the region's economy, and in 2024 included data on total jobs, wages, tourism jobs, seafood sales, regional population, and healthcare jobs.

=== Logging ===
Logging has been an important industry in the past, but has been steadily declining with competition from other areas and the closure of the region's major pulp mills; the Alaska Forest Association described the situation as "desperate" in 2011. Its members include Alcan Forest Products (owned by Canadian Transpac Group, one of the top 5 log exporters in North America) and Viking Lumber, which is based in Craig, Alaska. Debates over whether to expand logging in the federally owned Tongass are not uncommon.

=== Mining ===
Mining remains important in the northern area with the Juneau mining district containing the Kensington mine owned by Coeur Mining and Admiralty mining district, primarily Greens Creek operated by Hecla Mining, hosting active mines as of 2025. Gold was discovered in 1880 and played an important part in the early history of the region, although as of 2025 Greens Creek is notably focused on silver.

In the 2010s, mines increasingly began to be explored and eventually completed in neighboring British Columbia, upstream of important rivers such as the Unuk and the Stikine, which became known as the transboundary mining issue. In 2014, the dam breach at the Mount Polley mine focused attention on the issue, and an agreement between Canada and Alaska was drafted in 2015.

The proposed Kerr Sulphurets Mitchell exploration is upstream of the Unuk. Mines upstream of the Stikine include the Red Chris, which is owned by the same company (Imperial Metals) as the Mount Polley mine.

=== Healthcare ===
Major hospitals include Bartlett Regional Hospital in Juneau and PeaceHealth Ketchikan Medical Center in Ketchikan. Southeast Alaska Regional Health Consortium runs healthcare facilities across 27 communities as of 2022, including hospitals in Sitka and Wrangell; although it originally served Native Americans only, it has expanded access and combined with other local facilities over time.

=== Shipbuilding ===
Due to the fishing and ferries in the region, ship building and maintenance are economically significant.

Ketchikan hosts a shipbuilding yard owned by Vigor Industrial.

=== Tourism ===
Tourists visit southeast Alaska primarily in the summer, and most visit via cruise ships, which run from April 15 to October 30. In 2019, around 1.3 million people visited Alaska by cruise ship.

The northbound Inside Passage cruise commonly starts from either Seattle or Vancouver, Canada and stops in various ports including Ketchikan, Juneau, and Skagway. One-way trips will end in Whittier or Seward.

An alternative Gulf of Alaska cruise starts in Whittier (Anchorage) and also passes through southeast Alaska's Inside Passage.

The cruise ship industry became prominent in the 1960s after cruise ship entrepreneur Stanley B. McDonald repurposed a transport ship named Princess Pat, founding Princess Cruises to do leisure cruises which expanded into southeast Alaska by 1969. The TV series The Love Boat was set on a Princess cruise and featured episodes in Alaska; it also helped to popularize cruising generally which helped it grow rapidly between 1977 and 1987.

Prior to Princess cruises, Chuck West created a tourism agency in 1947 under the name Arctic Alaska Tours which was renamed Westours, which originally arranged trips for travelers on steamships.

=== Economic research ===
The University of Alaska's Institute of Social and Economic Research (ISER) publishes research on the Alaska economy; the former director Gunnar Knapp published extensively on the economics of fishing.

== History ==
The border between Alaska and the Canadian province of British Columbia was the subject of the Alaska boundary dispute, where the United States and the United Kingdom claimed different borderlines at the Alaskan panhandle. While the British foreign affairs were in favor of support of the Canadian argument, the event resulted in what was thought of as a betrayal, leading to alienation of the British from the new nation of Canada.

== Transportation ==
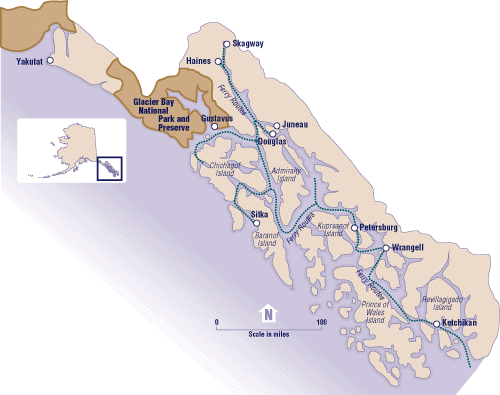
Southeast Alaska and Alaska Marine Highway ferry routes.

Due to the extremely rugged, mountainous nature of Southeastern Alaska, almost all communities (with the exception of Hyder, Skagway, and Haines) have no road connections outside of their locale, so aircraft and boats are the major means of transport. The Alaska Marine Highway passes through this region.

=== Air transportation ===
Alaska Airlines is by far the largest air carrier in the region, with Juneau's Juneau International Airport serving as the aerial hub for all of southeast, and Ketchikan's Ketchikan International Airport serving as a secondary hub for southern southeast Alaska. Alaska's bush airlines and air taxis serve many of the smaller and more isolated communities and villages in the regions. Many communities are accessible by air only by floatplane, as proper runways are often difficult to construct on the steep island slopes.

=== Marine transportation ===
Southeast Alaska is primarily served by the state-run Alaska Marine Highway, which links Skagway, Haines, Hoonah, Juneau, Sitka, Petersburg, Wrangell, Ketchikan and other outlying communities with Prince Rupert, BC and Bellingham, Washington; and secondarily by the Prince of Wales Island-based Inter-Island Ferry Authority, which provides the only scheduled passenger and auto ferry service to the island. A new Authority, the Rainforest Islands Ferry Authority, was created and in 2014 may possibly operate the North End route. The Authority would connect Coffman Cove with Wrangell and Petersburg. Small companies like Sitka-based Allen Marine and other independent operators in the Lynn Canal occasionally also offer marine passenger service. Ship traffic in the area is seasonally busy with cruise ships.

== See also ==
- Alexander Archipelago
- Alexander Archipelago wolf
- Climate change in Alaska
- List of edible plants and mushrooms of Southeast Alaska
