= Transportation in Alaska =

This article discusses transportation in the U.S. state of Alaska.

Alaska has a small population within a very large geographic area. The geographic differences mean that no single transportation strategy works for the state as a whole. Roads connect the major Southcentral population centers with Fairbanks and the Canadian border. Barges supply the communities along the coast and major rivers, and a ferry system supports the coastal communities in the south. A railroad connects the ports of Seward, Whittier, and Anchorage with the interior via Fairbanks. Many interior communities are connected by seasonal ATV trails when the weather is cold enough to freeze otherwise impassable grounds. Air travel is the critical connection between these various regions.

== Ground transportation ==
=== Roads ===
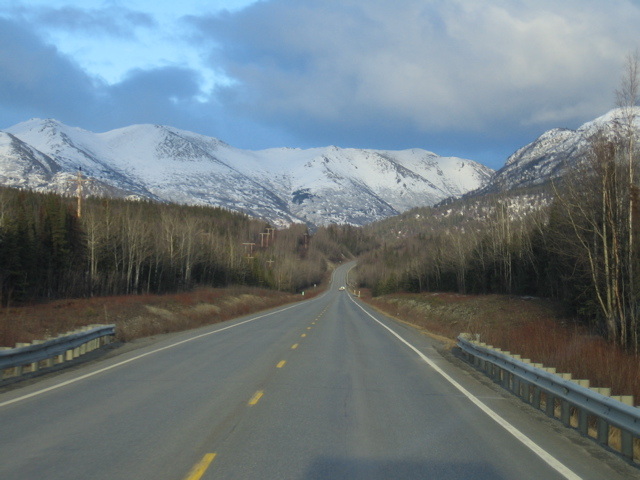
Sterling Highway

Alaska's climate and geography provide significant challenges to building and maintaining roads. Mountain ranges, permafrost, long distances between small population centers, and the cost of transporting materials all add to the costs and challenges of Alaska's road system. Many of the northern highways have tighter weight restrictions during spring, where axle load limits can be reduced by as much as 20% due to seasonally soft ground.

Alaska is arguably the least-connected U.S. state in terms of road transportation. Its road system covers a relatively small area of the state, linking the central population centers and the Alaska Highway, the principal route out of the state through Canada. The state capital, Juneau, is not accessible by road, which has spurred several debates over the decades about moving the capital to a city on the road system. One unique feature of the road system is the Anton Anderson Memorial Tunnel, which links the Seward Highway south of Anchorage with the relatively isolated community of Whittier. The tunnel held the title of the longest road tunnel in North America (at nearly 2.5 miles [4 km]) until completion of the 3.5-mile (5.6 km) Interstate 93 tunnel as part of the "Big Dig" project in Boston, Massachusetts. The tunnel retains the title of the longest combination road and rail tunnel in North America.

Vehicles are transported to and from many coastal communities only by boat.

=== Trails ===
==== Winter Trails ====
The State and local boroughs maintain about 4,700 miles (7,600 km) of winter trails throughout the northern and western regions. The trails often follow paths laid out by indigenous people, and the network stretches along the coast from Norton Sound to the Beaufort Sea. Trails reach the interior along the Yukon, Koyukuk, and Kobuk rivers. In 2004, the State Department of Transportation worked with local partners to provide wayfinding in the form of tripods made of 8-foot (2.4 m) tall reflective stakes, able to be placed each season when the ground freezes enough to allow passage. It intended to place these tripods at least every 500 feet (150 m). In addition to refuge cabins maintained along the route in case of emergency, the tripods can be used for basic shelter with the addition of a tarpaulin.

Winter trails are established every winter after the ground freezes and contain three categories:

- Winter Trails are unimproved trails suitable for dog sleds or snowmachines. (Note: Snowmachines are generally known as snowmobiles outside of Alaska. Since "snowmachine" is the terminology used within the State of Alaska's official long-range transportation plans, it is what is being used in this article.) The trails are marked with blazes and signs where tall vegetation allows, or tripods and plastic stakes when there is no tall vegetation.
- Snow Roads are routes constructed of packed snow that is suitable for dog sleds, snowmachines, and 4WD vehicles traveling in a convoy. The Bureau of Land Management (BLM) and Alaska Department of Natural Resources (DNR) are experimenting with whether snow roads can be expanded under specific, structured conditions in a way that protects the fragile tundra environment.
- Ice Roads are routes constructed of frozen water that are suitable for heavier equipment. These roads have been popularized by the reality TV show Ice Road Truckers.

==== Iditarod Trail System ====
The Iditarod National Historic Trail (not to be mistaken for the race of the same name) is a network of roughly 2,400 miles (3,900 km) of trail stretching from Seward in the southeast to Nome in the northwest. The trail began as a composite of trails established by Alaskan native peoples. During the Gold Rush era from the 1890s to the 1920s, it connected a string of mines, trading posts, and settlements, for which it was declared a National Historic Trail in 1978.

==== RS 2477 ====
The Revised statute 2477 of 1866 was passed to allow for the development of the Western states. It states that "the right-of-way for the construction of highways across public lands not otherwise reserved for public purposes is hereby granted," with no requirements for a survey or a recorded decision creating the road. RS 2477 was repealed in 1976, but the access it provided across Federally owned land was not rescinded. Access to trails across what was at the time Federal lands can be retained as public highways. Since most land title in Alaska was held by the Federal Government before the passage of the Alaska Native Claims Settlement Act (ANCSA) in 1977, RS277 trails now cross public and private lands and remain vital to transportation within Alaska. The DNR actively researches and pursues historical trail use to assert public access to RS 2477 trails.

=== Railroad ===
==== Alaska Railroad ====
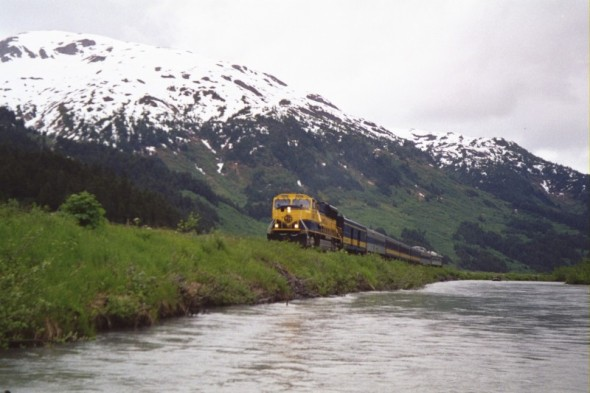
Alaska Railroad "Glacier Discovery" train

The Alaska Railroad runs from Seward through Anchorage, Denali, and Fairbanks to North Pole, with spurs to Whittier and Palmer (locally known as "The Railbelt"). Purchased by the State from the Federal Government in 1985, it is run as a state cooperation. The railroad carries both freight and passengers throughout its system, but only runs daily passenger service in the summer to accommodate tourists and a more limited weekly passenger service in the winter primarily for residents. The railroad plays a vital part in moving Alaska's natural resources, such as coal and gravel, to ports in Anchorage, Whittier, and Seward. In 2015, the railroad carried more than 4.3 million tons of freight. The railroad brings goods from tidewater to the interior city of Fairbanks, and to Nenana, where goods are put on barges to travel the Tanana and Yukon rivers. There are rail connections by barge between Whittier and the port of Seattle.

The Alaska Railroad carries about 500 thousand passengers a year. Most passengers use the Alaska Railroad for seasonal recreational use. The Alaska Railroad offers one of the last flag stop routes in the country. A stretch of about 60 miles (97 km) of track along an area inaccessible by road serves as the only transportation to cabins in the area. Although rail ferry service links Alaska with Washington state (Seattle) and British Columbia, there are plans to link Alaska to the rest of the North American rail network via Yukon Territory and British Columbia.

==== White Pass and Yukon ====
The White Pass and Yukon Route was established in 1898 between Skagway and Whitehorse. Originally built for the Klondike Gold Rush, it was not completed before the rush died down. The railway found work hauling Canadian copper, silver, and lead to tidewater in Skagway. A combination of low ore prices and competition with the Haines Highway, which saw major improvements in 1976, caused the White Pass and Yukon Railroad to close on October 7, 1982.

In 1988 the railroad was reopened as a passenger-only line catering to tourists, traveling to Lake Bennet and back, using vintage parlor cars. In 2015 the line carried 401,905 passengers on an excursion to the summit and back.

==== Potential connections with Canada ====
The idea of a Canada–Alaska Railway has been discussed and studied for years. In 2005, a joint study funded by Alaska and the Yukon found that such a railroad would cost US$11 Billion to build, but could increase the GDP of Alaska and Canada by approximately US$170 Billion. In 2016, an Alberta to Alaska pre-feasibility study paid for by the Alberta government determined that a railroad connecting Alberta to Alaska would cost between $27 and $34 Billion CDN, but could allow the development of $659 Billion CDN worth of minerals over 30 years.

As of November 2021, the Alaska-Alberta Railway Development Corporation is proposing connecting Fort McMurray, Alberta with the Point MacKenzie, Alaska through the Alaska Railroad.

=== Bus ===
Nearly all larger cities and boroughs across the state operate local bus systems, including Anchorage, Fairbanks, Juneau, Sitka, Ketchikan and Bethel. While Greyhound does not operate in Alaska, numerous private bus companies in the state offer regional bus service, with Anchorage and Fairbanks as the primary hub cities.

== Marine transport ==
Many cities and villages in the state are accessible only by sea or air. Alaska has a well-developed ferry system, known as the Alaska Marine Highway, which serves the cities in Southeast and Southcentral Alaska as well as in the Alaska Peninsula. The system also operates a ferry service from Bellingham, Washington and Prince Rupert, British Columbia in Canada up the Inside Passage to Skagway. In the Prince of Wales Island region of Southeast, the Inter-Island Ferry Authority also serves as an important marine link for many communities and works in concert with the Alaska Marine Highway. Cruise ships are an increasingly popular way for tourists to see Alaska.

=== River barges ===
The Yukon and Tanana rivers allow for seasonal barge use for barges with about 4.5 feet of draft. Barge service is provided by private industry and provides most of the bulk fuel and material shipments for villages in the area. The tight ice-free season means that some villages only receive barge service 3 or 4 times a year. The only permanent port barge facilities are the rail/barge transfer sites at Nenana, although most bulk fuel is loaded onto the barge in North Pole.

== Air transport ==
Since surface transportation in Alaska has so many difficulties, air transport is essential to how Alaskans travel within the state. The state owns and maintains a majority of the airports within the state but relies on private air carriers to provide air service. Alaska has several regional hubs, such as Bethel, Nome, Kotzebue, and Dillingham, that receive regular service with large aircraft and act as the base for smaller aircraft to serve communities within the region. The bulk of remaining commercial flight offerings come from small regional commuter airlines like Ravn Alaska, PenAir, and Frontier Flying Service. The smallest towns and villages rely on scheduled or chartered bush flying services using general aviation aircraft such as the Cessna Caravan, the most popular aircraft in use in the state. With surface transportation being varied and seasonable, aircraft are used extensively for freight as well as passengers, and Alaska Airlines is the only major U.S. airline to maintain a fleet of dedicated cargo aircraft.

Air travel is the cheapest and most efficient form of transportation in and out of the state. Anchorage recently completed extensive remodeling and construction at Ted Stevens Anchorage International Airport to help accommodate the upsurge in tourism. In 2000–2001, the latest year for which data are available, 2.4 million total arrivals to Alaska were counted, 1.7 million came via air travel, and 1.4 million were visitors.

Perhaps the most quintessentially Alaskan plane is the bush seaplane. The world's busiest seaplane base is Lake Hood, located next to Ted Stevens Anchorage International Airport, where flights bound for remote villages without an airstrip carry passengers, cargo, and an abundance of items from stores and warehouse clubs. Alaska has the highest number of pilots per capita of any U.S. state: out of the estimated 663,661 residents, 8,550 are pilots, or about one in every 78.

=== Bypass Mail Service ===
Because of the high volume of mail that travels by air within the state, the Bypass Mail System was formed to "alleviate congestion of mail in processing centers by creating bypass mail acceptance points." Because of the high quantity of mail shipped to rural Alaska from Anchorage and Fairbanks, the program intended to allow certain volume shippers to bypass postal facilities entirely, reducing cost and congestion. The USPS pays airlines to deliver the packages by air, but charges shippers USPS ground rates to do so, based on a premise that the Post Office should treat each customer the same, whether that customer is in rural Alaska a more well-connected suburb in the lower 48 U.S. states. A 2011 report from the U.S. Postal Service Office of Inspector General states the program lost $73 million 2010, that it supports a freight service shipping things that would not be considered mail in the rest of the United States, and that it provides a higher level of service than Priority Mail while charging less than parcel post. Supporters of the bypass mail system argue that it is an essential lifeline for rural Alaska, and that it actually saves money for the USPS by reducing the handling costs on mail the Post Office would be obligated to ship anyway.

The bypass mail system pays at an "intra-Alaska mainline service rate," which is an average cost of operations from a pool of carriers. Some carriers receive as much as 60% of their revenue from Bypass Mail contracts, allowing them to provide more frequent passenger service as well.

=== Essential Air Service ===
With the Airline Deregulation Act, airlines gained the ability to end service on unprofitable routes. To maintain service, Congress created the Essential Air Service (EAS) program. Through EAS, the Department of Transportation subsidizes passenger and freight service to communities that would otherwise be too small for viable service. In Alaska, there are approximately 60 communities served by EAS.

== Other transport ==
Another Alaskan transportation method is the dogsled. In modern times, dog mushing is more of a sport than a true means of transportation. Various races are held around the state, but the best known is the Iditarod Trail Sled Dog Race, a 1,150-mile (1,850 km) trail from Anchorage to Nome. The race commemorates the famous 1925 serum run to Nome in which mushers and dogs like Balto took much-needed medicine to the diphtheria-stricken community of Nome when all other means of transportation had failed. Mushers from all over the world come to Anchorage each March to compete for cash prizes and prestige.

In areas not served by road or rail, primary summer transportation is by all-terrain vehicle and primary winter transportation is by snowmobile, or "snow machine," as it is commonly referred to in Alaska.

In the United States, Alaska has the highest percentage of people whose method of commute to work is walking.

== See also ==
- Plug-in electric vehicles in Alaska
