= Yellow cedar =

Yellow cedar is a common name for several trees and may refer to:

- Callitropsis nootkatensis, native to northwestern North America
- Palicourea croceoides, found in the West Indies and French Guiana
- Thuja occidentalis, native to northeastern North America
