= Plug-in electric vehicles in Alaska =

As of 2021, there were about 1,500 electric vehicles in Alaska.

In 2021, Alaska was ranked by Bumper.com as the worst state in the U.S. for electric vehicle ownership.

As of 2021, Alaska is the only state in the U.S. where a company other than Tesla—in this case, Nissan—comprises a plurality of the state's electric vehicle market.

== Charging stations ==
As of March 2022, there were 48 charging stations in Alaska.

The state received its first public DC charger in August 2021.

== By region ==
=== Juneau ===
As of February 2022, Juneau has the highest rate of electric vehicle ownership in the state, and one of the highest in the country.
