= Eskay Creek =

Stream in British Columbia, Canada

Coordinates: 56°38′59″N 130°28′02″W

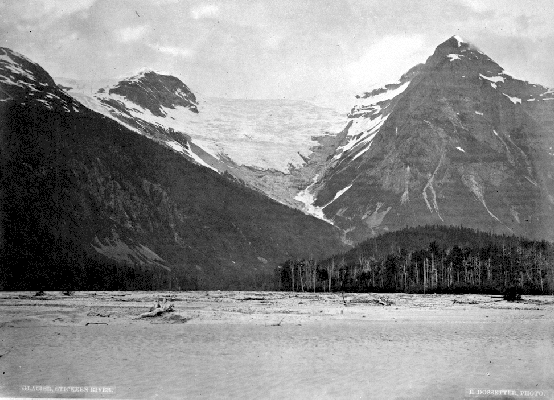
Stikine River

The Eskay Creek region is a rich gold and silver mining area in the Unuk and Iskut River region on north coastal mountains of British Columbia.

The area was mined by Homestake Mining and then Barrick Gold Corporation. The geology is considered by most workers to be a volcanogenic massive sulfide ore deposit containing gold, silver, copper, zinc, arsenic, antimony and mercury. The mine produced 3.3 million ounces of gold and 160 million ounces of silver at average grades of 45 g/t gold and 2,224 g/t silver from 1994–2008.

== Climate ==
Unuk River Eskay Creek is a weather station located near the Eskay Creek Mine, situated at an elevation of 887 m (2910 ft).

Climate data for Unuk River Eskay Creek, British Columbia, 1990-2009 normals, 1989-2010 extremes: 887m (2910ft)
| Month | Jan | Feb | Mar | Apr | May | Jun | Jul | Aug | Sep | Oct | Nov | Dec | Year |
|---|---|---|---|---|---|---|---|---|---|---|---|---|---|
| Record high °C (°F) | 8 (46) | 19 (66) | 17 (63) | 21 (70) | 24 (76) | 29 (84) | 28 (82) | 33 (91) | 21 (70) | 21 (70) | 6 (43) | 4 (39) | 33 (91) |
| Mean maximum °C (°F) | 2.1 (35.8) | 3.4 (38.1) | 5.7 (42.3) | 11.7 (53.1) | 16.2 (61.2) | 21.6 (70.9) | 23.5 (74.3) | 23.9 (75.0) | 16.7 (62.1) | 10.2 (50.4) | 3.4 (38.1) | 1.5 (34.7) | 25.4 (77.8) |
| Mean daily maximum °C (°F) | −5.3 (22.5) | −2.9 (26.8) | −0.4 (31.2) | 4.6 (40.3) | 8.8 (47.8) | 13.2 (55.7) | 14.9 (58.8) | 14.7 (58.4) | 9.2 (48.5) | 3.2 (37.8) | −2.2 (28.1) | −4.5 (23.9) | 4.4 (40.0) |
| Daily mean °C (°F) | −8.1 (17.4) | −6.1 (21.1) | −4.1 (24.7) | 0.5 (32.9) | 4.3 (39.8) | 8.2 (46.8) | 10.4 (50.8) | 10.3 (50.6) | 5.9 (42.7) | 0.7 (33.2) | −4.6 (23.8) | −7.2 (19.0) | 0.9 (33.6) |
| Mean daily minimum °C (°F) | −10.8 (12.5) | −9.1 (15.7) | −7.6 (18.3) | −3.6 (25.5) | 0.0 (32.0) | 3.3 (38.0) | 6.0 (42.8) | 6.1 (43.0) | 2.9 (37.2) | −1.9 (28.6) | −7.0 (19.4) | −9.8 (14.3) | −2.6 (27.3) |
| Mean minimum °C (°F) | −23.1 (−9.5) | −19.4 (−2.9) | −17.3 (0.9) | −10.7 (12.8) | −4.6 (23.8) | −0.4 (31.3) | 2.0 (35.6) | 1.4 (34.6) | −2.2 (28.0) | −8.7 (16.4) | −16.1 (3.1) | −21.6 (−6.8) | −26.4 (−15.6) |
| Record low °C (°F) | −31 (−24) | −28 (−18) | −28 (−18) | −15 (5) | −9 (16) | −2 (28) | −1 (30) | −3 (27) | −10 (14) | −14 (7) | −29 (−20) | −30 (−22) | −31 (−24) |
| Average precipitation mm (inches) | 249 (9.80) | 212 (8.34) | 177 (6.95) | 97 (3.83) | 82 (3.21) | 64 (2.52) | 80 (3.13) | 129 (5.09) | 207 (8.15) | 237 (9.32) | 214 (8.44) | 226 (8.91) | 1,974 (77.69) |
| Average snowfall cm (inches) | 243 (95.6) | 206 (81.0) | 172 (67.7) | 78 (30.9) | 16 (6.2) | 0.0 (0.0) | 0.0 (0.0) | 0.0 (0.0) | 5.6 (2.2) | 101 (39.9) | 198 (78.1) | 226 (88.8) | 1,245.6 (490.4) |
Source: XMACIS2 (normals, extremes & 1990-2009 precip/snow)
