= 1969 in Alaska =

- Decades: 1940s; 1950s; 1960s; 1970s; 1980s
- See also: History of Alaska; Historical outline of Alaska; List of years in Alaska; 1969 in the United States

The following is a list of events of the year 1959 in Alaska.

== Incumbents ==
=== State government ===
- Governor:

Wally Hickel (until January)
Keith Harvey Miller (after January)

== Deaths ==
- Harry Kawabe, businessman
- 5 February – Nick Bez, aviator and businessman
- 10 March – Muriel Hannah, artist

== Births ==
- Vivica Genaux, singer
- 10 May – Hilary Lindh, skier

== See also ==
- 1969 in the United States
