= 2024 in Alaska =

- Decades: 2000s; 2010s; 2020s
- See also: History of Alaska; Historical outline of Alaska; List of years in Alaska; 2024 in the United States

The following is a list of events of the year 2024 in Alaska.

== Incumbents ==
=== State government ===
- Governor: Mike Dunleavy (R)

== Events ==
- February 22 – Murder of Kathleen Jo Henry: An Alaskan jury finds Brian Smith guilty of the murder of Kathleen Jo Henry and Veronica Abouchuk.
- March 5 – Super Tuesday:
  - The Democratic Party holds presidential nominating contests in Alaska amongst other states.
  - The Republican Party holds presidential nominating contests in Alaska amongst other states.
- April 23 – A Douglas DC-4 crashes into the Tanana River, shortly after takeoff from Fairbanks, killing two people on board.
- July 24 – The North American Aerospace Defense Command intercepts two Russian and two Chinese bomber aircraft flying together near Alaska, marking the first record of Chinese H-6 aircraft entering Alaska's Air Defense Identification Zone, and marking the first time both countries were intercepted operating together.
- August 26 – One person is killed and three others are injured in a landslide in Ketchikan.

== See also ==
- 2024 in the United States
