= 2025 in Alaska =

- Decades: 2000s; 2010s; 2020s
- See also: History of Alaska; Historical outline of Alaska; List of years in Alaska; 2025 in the United States

The following is a list of events of the year 2025 in Alaska.

== Incumbents ==
=== State Government ===
- Governor: Mike Dunleavy (R)

== Events ==
=== January ===
- January 20 – President Donald Trump signs an executive order to change the federal designation of Denali back to Mount McKinley. The Alaskan government continues to use Denali.

=== February ===
- February 6 – The 10 occupants of a plane are killed in a crash near Nome.

=== March ===
- March 4 – Three skiers from Minnesota are killed in an avalanche near Girdwood.

=== May ===
- May 21 – 2025 Southwest United States measles outbreak: A resident of the Municipality of Anchorage tests positive for measles.

=== June ===
- June 19 – Olga Michael from the village of Kwethluk is officially canonized as Saint Olga of Alaska by the Orthodox Church, making her the first female Orthodox saint from North America.

=== August ===
- August 15 – 2025 Russia–United States Summit in Anchorage

=== October ===
- October 7 – Mindy O'Neill is elected mayor of Fairbanks, defeating incumbent mayor David Pruhs.
- October 11–12 – Remnants of Typhoon Halong strike Alaska, killing one person. More than 1,500 are displaced and the villages of Kipnuk and Kwigillingok are badly damaged.

=== December ===
- December 6 – A magnitude 7.0 earthquake strikes a rural area near the Canadian border. No injuries or property damage are reported.

== See also ==
- 2025 in the United States
