= 2022 in Alaska =

- Decades: 2000s; 2010s; 2020s
- See also: History of Alaska; Historical outline of Alaska; List of years in Alaska; 2022 in the United States

The following is a list of events of the year 2022 in Alaska.

== Incumbents ==
=== State government ===
- Governor: Mike Dunleavy (R)

== Events ==
- Ongoing: COVID-19 pandemic in Alaska
- November 8:
  - 2022 Alaska gubernatorial election
  - 2022 Alaska Senate election
- December 9 – The Ironman Triathlon cancels the 2023 and 2024 triathlons to be held in Juneau, citing economic concerns.

== See also ==
- 2022 in the United States
