= 1959 in Alaska =

- Decades: 1930s; 1940s; 1950s; 1960s; 1970s
- See also: History of Alaska; Historical outline of Alaska; List of years in Alaska; 1959 in the United States

The following is a list of events of the year 1959 in Alaska.

== Incumbents ==
=== State government ===
- Governor: William A. Egan (D)

== Events ==
- January 3 –
  - The Territory of Alaska is admitted as the 49th state of the United States.
  - William A. Egan is elected as the first governor of the State of Alaska.
- January 26 – The 1st Alaska State Legislature is established.

== See also ==
- 1959 in the United States
