= 2023 in Alaska =

- Decades: 2000s; 2010s; 2020s
- See also: History of Alaska; Historical outline of Alaska; List of years in Alaska; 2023 in the United States

The following is a list of events of the year 2023 in Alaska.

== Incumbents ==
=== State government ===
- Governor: Mike Dunleavy (R)

== Events ==
- January 11 – The launch of an unmanned ABL Space Systems RS1 rocket fails at the Pacific Spaceport Complex – Alaska in Kodiak. The rocket crashes during the launch, damaging the launch platform and destroying the rocket and its cargo.
- January 17 – A polar bear attacks and kills a woman and her son in Wales, after charging several others, in the first fatal attack since the early 1980s. The bear is shot and killed following the attack.
- February 10 – 2023 Alaska high-altitude object: The White House's spokesperson John Kirby announces that the United States Air Force shot down a high-altitude object over territorial waters in Alaska, just days after shooting down a Chinese balloon over the Atlantic Ocean. The object was ordered to be shot down by U.S. President Joe Biden because it posed "a reasonable threat to the safety of civilian flight".
- April 27 – 2023 Alaska mid-air collision: Three United States Army personnel are killed and another is injured when two AH-64 Apache helicopters collide over Healy, near Fort Wainwright.
- May 29 – One person is killed and four others are missing after a chartered boat sinks near Sitka.
- July 16 – A 7.2 magnitude earthquake strikes off the coast of Alaska, causing a tsunami warning to be issued for the region.
- August 10 – Alaska reports its worst air quality in recorded history after extreme amounts of smoke enter the state due to the Canadian wildfires.
- November 20 – An avalanche kills three people and leaves several others missing in Wrangell.

== See also ==
- 2023 in the United States
