= 2026 in Alaska =

- Decades: 2000s; 2010s; 2020s
- See also: History of Alaska; Historical outline of Alaska; List of years in Alaska; 2026 in the United States

The following is a list of events of the year 2026 in Alaska.

== Incumbents ==
=== State Government ===
- Governor: Mike Dunleavy (R)

== Events ==
- January 13 – A University of Alaska Fairbanks student is arrested for eating multiple pieces of AI-generated art at the university's Fine Arts building.
- February 19 – The North American Aerospace Defense Command (NORAD) detects several Russian military aircraft operating in the Alaska Air Defense Identification Zone (ADIZ).
- March 7 – The Iditarod Trail Sled Dog Race is held in Anchorage.
- March 15 – Two tugboat crew members are killed in an accident off the coast of Ketchikan.
- May 27 – Four members of a seven-person Latvian climbing team fall while climbing near Denali. Three of the members die and one is rescued.
- June 15 – A judge rules that a Petersburg man named Dan J. Sullivan, who shares the same name as incumbent Senator Dan S. Sullivan and is running against him in the senate election, is ineligible for the ballot because his candidacy "was not filed in order to declare an actual good-faith candidacy for the office of United States Senator, but was instead filed with a purpose to confuse or mislead and to thereby compromise the ballot's fairness or neutrality."
- June 26 – A superior court judge reinstates Dan J. Sullivan to the ballot, ruling that the earlier "good faith" declaration was not based on the Constitution, state law, or other regulations.
- August 20 – Eight people are killed in a charter plane crash near Cape Newenham Long Range Radar Site.
- August 26 – Four men, including former Bethel mayor Eric Middlebrook, are killed in a plane crash near Seldovia.
- September 11 – The state of Alaska drops charges against several American Samoans who voted in an election. Unlike other territories, American Samoans are American nationals, not citizens, and thus cannot vote in elections in the states.
- October 23 – The Trump administration files a lawsuit to block the Senate election in Alaska from being certified should Dan S. Sullivan lose, citing confusion over names.

=== Predicted and scheduled ===
- November 3
  - 2026 Alaska gubernatorial election
  - 2026 United States Senate election in Alaska

== See also ==
- 2026 in the United States
