= 2021 in Alaska =

- Decades: 2000s; 2010s; 2020s
- See also: History of Alaska; Historical outline of Alaska; List of years in Alaska; 2021 in the United States

The following is a list of events of the year 2021 in Alaska.

== Incumbents ==
=== State government ===
- Governor: Mike Dunleavy (R)

== Events ==
Ongoing: COVID-19 pandemic in Alaska

- January 26: Alaska reports its first case of the UK variant of SARS-CoV-2.
- February 24:
  - Governor Mike Dunleavy tests positive for COVID-19 following a brief period of isolation after suspected exposure.
  - Alaska reports their first case of the Lineage P.1 variant first detected in Brazil in a person from Anchorage with no known travel history.
- March 9: Governor Mike Dunleavy announces that Alaska will drop its eligibility requirements for the COVID-19 vaccine and allow all residents over the age of 16 to receive it, thereby becoming the first state to do so. The state has also led other states in the percentage of its population to be fully vaccinated against COVID-19.
- March 18: Representatives from China and the U.S. meet in Anchorage for diplomatic talks.
- March 27: A Eurocopter AS350B3 helicopter crashes into a glacier near Anchorage,, killing five people, including Czech billionaire Petr Kellner. One crew member survived and has been hospitalized.
- June 1: U.S. Secretary of the Interior Deb Haaland suspends all oil and gas drilling leases in Alaska's Arctic National Wildlife Refuge, pending further review of their environmental impacts. U.S. President Joe Biden previously on January 20 issued an executive order freezing oil and gas exploration activities at the Refuge for similar reasons.
- July 28: An 8.2 magnitude earthquake strikes off the coast of Alaska, with at least two strong aftershocks (6.2 and 5.6) and prompting tsunami warnings. It is the strongest earthquake to hit the United States since the 1965 Rat Islands earthquake, which also occurred off the Alaskan coast.
- December 26: Kodiak sets the highest temperature ever recorded in December in the state of Alaska, reaching 19.4 °C (66.9 °F). The Aleutian Islands and island communities in West Alaska have seen abnormally high temperatures since mid-December, including eight straight days of over 10 °C (50 °F) in Unalaska, including 13.3 °C (55.9 °F) on Christmas Day, the warmest Christmas temperature on record for the state. Temperature anomalies for late December reach 10–15 °C (18–27 °F) in some areas. The state also lately experiences unusually wet spells of weather.

== See also ==
- 2021 in the United States
