= 2013 in Alaska =

== Events ==
- January 15 – The 28th Alaska State Legislature convened its first regular session in Juneau.
- May – Severe flooding along the Yukon River affected communities including Galena and other western Alaska settlements.
  - May 21 – Governor Sean Parnell signed legislation overhauling Alaska's oil production tax system, replacing the state's previous tax structure with the More Alaska Production Act (SB 21).
- September – Mining company Anglo American withdrew from the proposed Pebble Mine project in southwest Alaska.

== Deaths ==
September 9 – Bill Ray, politician, businessman and former member of the Alaska Legislature.

== See also ==
- 2013 in the United States
