= Murder of Kathleen Jo Henry =

2019 murder of Alaska Native woman

- Date: September 4, 2019 (murder occurred); October 2, 2019 (body discovered)
- Location: Anchorage, Alaska, U.S.
- Arrests: Brian Steven Smith
- Charges: First degree murder Second-degree murder Sexual assault Tampering with evidence
- Verdict: Guilty on all counts

The murder of Kathleen Jo Henry occurred on September 4, 2019, in Anchorage, Alaska, United States. The murder occurred at a local TownePlace Suites hotel, room 323, operated by Marriott International.

== Overview ==
Kathleen Jo Henry's remains were found along Alaska's Seward Highway on October 2, 2019. She had been strangled and sexually assaulted approximately one month earlier.

An SD card containing videos and photos of her death was turned over to detectives with the Anchorage Police Department who recognized Brian Steven Smith from a previous investigation, and obtained a warrant for his arrest. On October 8, 2019, Smith was arrested at Ted Stevens Anchorage International Airport upon returning from a trip. Smith was subsequently booked into an Anchorage jail.

Police later stated that they discovered thirty-nine photos and twelve videos related to Henry's assault and murder on the SD card, onto which the videos and images had been saved from a cellular phone by a woman who had earlier stolen the phone from Smith's truck.

== Kathleen Jo Henry ==
Kathleen Jo Henry was an Alaska Native woman from the Yup'ik village of Eek, in Western Alaska. She was born December 22, 1988, in Bethel, Alaska. Henry was a mother, a frequent user of Facebook and other social media, and enjoyed writing poetry. She obtained her GED in 2012, while incarcerated in Alaska's Highland Mountain Correctional Center, a state prison in the Anchorage neighborhood of Eagle River. At the time of her death in September of 2019, Henry was 30 years old. For a time preceding her death, Henry had reportedly struggled with addiction and had previous contact with local law enforcement.

== Suspect ==
Smith (b. March 23, 1971) was born in South Africa, in the Queenstown area, and later immigrated to the United States. He became a U.S. citizen in September 2019.

Smith was identified as the suspect in Henry's murder based on photograph and video evidence obtained by the Anchorage Police Department. Since then, Smith has been implicated in another murder, and authorities consider him a serial killer. His past in both the United States and South Africa is the subject of an ongoing, international investigation. Smith is also known to have expressed racist views on Quora posts. For example, he claimed that Black people are far more likely to commit crimes: "White people don’t assume it, everyone assumes it when they look at police crime statistics. Wherever black people go in the world, there is an immediate rise in crime. It is a statistical fact that blacks are ± 600% more likely to violate the law."

Smith was also charged with murdering a second woman, Veronica Abouchuk, after confessing to her murder and telling authorities where they could find her body. The Police already had discovered the remains of Abouchuk on the 18th, likely before questioning. Detectives with the Anchorage Police Department, as well as the Federal Bureau of Investigation, continued to look into Smith's past.

== Trial ==
On February 22, 2024, an Anchorage jury found Smith guilty on 11 felony counts, including the murders of both Kathleen Henry and Veronica Abouchuk, sexual assault, and tampering with physical evidence. On July 12, 2024, Smith was sentenced to 226 years in prison.

Smith filed an appeal with the Alaska Court of Appeals on October 7th, 2024. Briefings have not yet been filed in that case as of February, 2026.

== See also ==
- List of solved missing person cases (2010s)
- List of unsolved murders (2000–present)
- Missing and murdered indigenous women
