= Northwest Coast =

Northwest Coast may refer to:

- The coastal region of the Pacific Northwest
- The anthropological term for Indigenous peoples of the Pacific Northwest Coast
- British Columbia Coast
- North West Australia
- North West Tasmania

== See also ==
- North West Coastal Highway, in Western Australia
