= Harry Kawabe =

Japanese businessman incarcerated during WWII

Harry Sotaro Kawabe
- Born: June 10, 1890; Near Osaka, Japan
- Died: November 1969 (age 79); United States
- Occupation: Businessman
- Known for: Contributing greatly to the economy of Seward, Alaska
- Spouse(s): Toshiko Suzuki (1923-1930), Tomo Kawano (1931-November 1969)

Harry Sotaro Kawabe (June 10, 1890 – 1969) was a Japanese businessman who was incarcerated during World War II. He is known for contributing greatly to the economy of Seward, Alaska. In 1969, he founded the Kawabe Memorial House for elderly Japanese Americans, and the 154-unit complex was built through the HUD Senior Housing program in 1972.

== Biography ==
Harry Sotaro Kawabe (ja:川部 惣太郎) was born on June 10, 1890, in a small rural village near Osaka, Maihara, Shiga, Japan. His family members were farmers. In 1906, Kawabe moved to Seattle, Washington and worked as a houseboy. He moved to Alaska in 1909, hoping to become rich off of gold mining. He did not have much luck and used what he had to move to Seward. He started buying empty lots and businesses in Seward. In 1923 he moved back to Japan and married Toshiko Suzuki (c.1901-1930), who died in 1930. He moved back to Alaska and married Tomo Kawano (August 1, 1893 - March 1970). Harry and Tomo had no children of their own but were kind to the local children, doing things such as driving the children in one of the town's few cars. When the Japanese attacked Pearl Harbor Kawabe, his wife, and other Japanese American residents of Seward were detained at Fort Richardson. At the end of the war the detainees returned to Seward; however, Harry and Tomo moved to Seattle after staying in Alaska for a while. In 1953, after the McCarran-Walter Act removed restrictions that had barred Asian immigrants from naturalization since 1924, Harry was allowed to obtain U.S. citizenship. In 1978, the Kawabe Scholarship, given to Seward High School students, was created in his honor. Harry died in November 1969.

== Businesses ==
While in Seward Kawabe owned various businesses, such as:

- Bank of Seward
- Kawabe's Gift Store
- Alaska Furs
- Seward Hardware Company
- Place Hotel and Bar
- Moose Bar
- local liquor store
- Marathon Cafe
- Seward Grill
- O.K. Barber Shop
- Miller Barber Shop
- Northern Apartments
- Dreamland Hall
- various laundromats
