= History of Alaska =

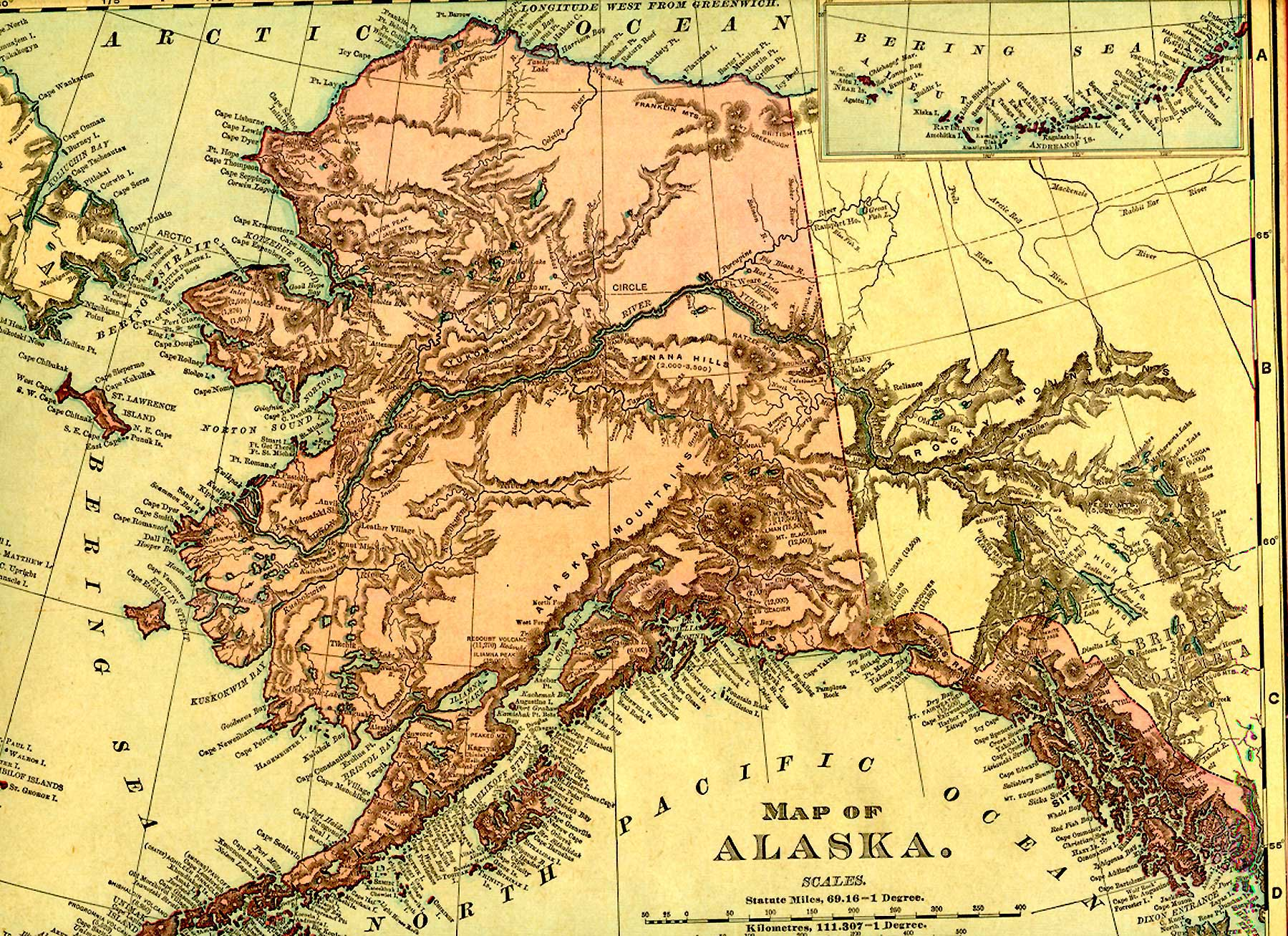
Alaska in 1895 (Rand McNally). The boundary of southeastern Alaska shown is that claimed by the United States before the conclusion of the Alaska boundary dispute.

The history of Alaska dates back to the Upper Paleolithic period (around 14,000 BC), when foraging groups crossed the Bering land bridge into what is now western Alaska. At the time of European contact by the Russian explorers, the area was populated by Alaska Native groups. The name "Alaska" derives from the Aleut word Alaxsxaq (also spelled Alyeska), meaning "mainland" or "continent" (literally, "the object toward which the action of the sea is directed"). While initially used to refer solely to the Alaska Peninsula, the name eventually broadened to represent the entirety of Alaska.

The U.S. purchased Alaska from Russia in 1867. In the 1890s, gold rushes in Alaska and the nearby Yukon Territory brought thousands of miners and settlers to Alaska. Alaska was granted territorial status in 1912 by the United States of America.

In 1942, two of the outer Aleutian Islands—Attu and Kiska—were occupied by the Japanese Navy during World War II and their recovery for the U.S. became a matter of national pride. The construction of military bases contributed to the population growth of some Alaskan cities.

Alaska was granted U.S. statehood on January 3, 1959.

In 1964, the massive "Good Friday earthquake" killed 131 people and leveled several villages.

The 1968 discovery of oil at Prudhoe Bay and the 1977 completion of the Trans-Alaska Pipeline led to an oil boom. In 1989, the Exxon Valdez hit a reef in Prince William Sound, spilling between 11 and 34 million US gallons (42,000 and 129,000 m^{3}) of crude oil over 1,100 miles (1,800 km) of coastline. Today, the battle between philosophies of development and conservation is seen in the contentious debate over oil drilling in the Arctic National Wildlife Refuge.

== Prehistory of Alaska ==
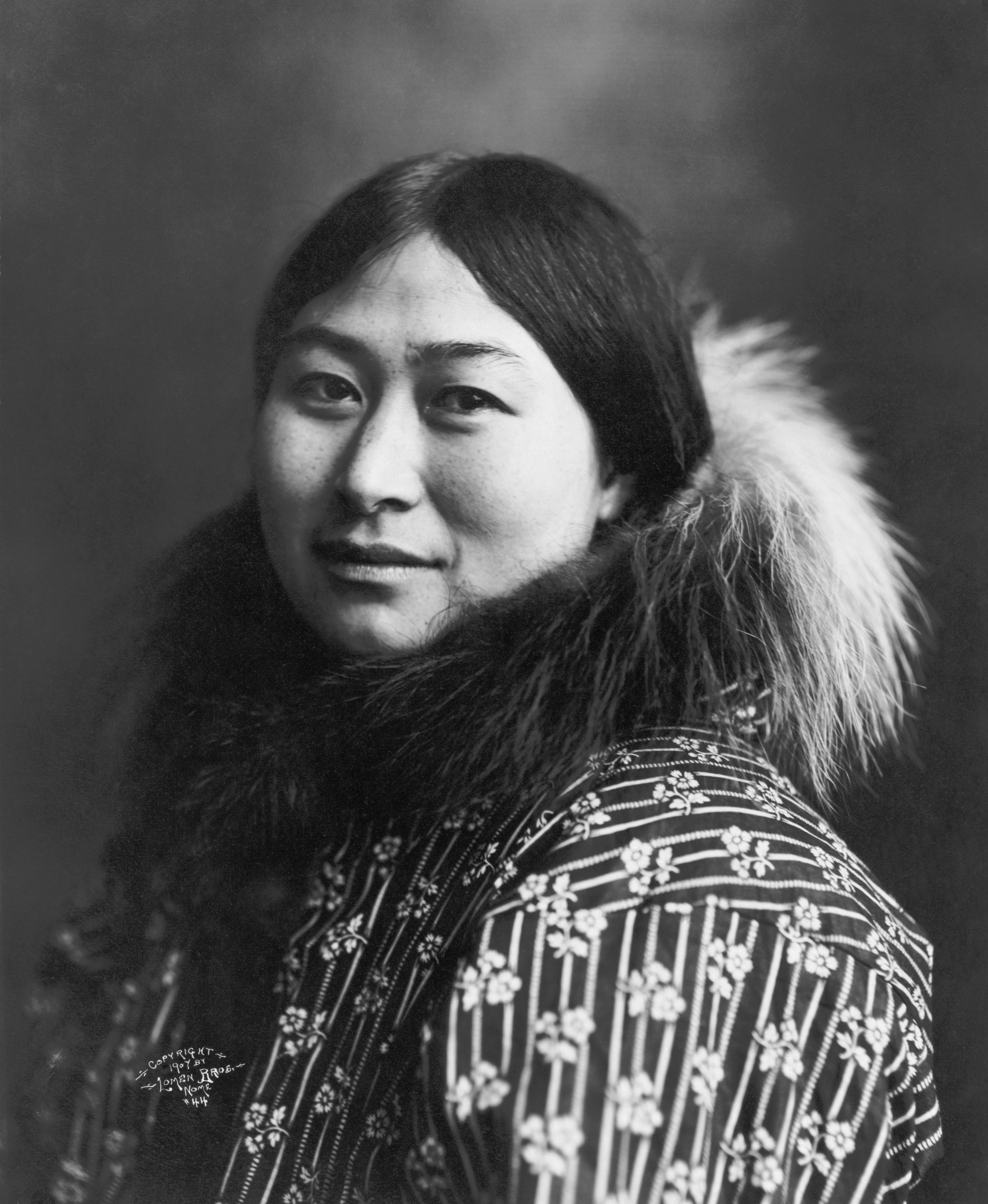
An Inupiaq woman, Nome, Alaska, c. 1907

Paleolithic families moved into northwestern North America before 10,000 BC across the Bering land bridge in Alaska (see Settlement of the Americas). Alaska became populated by the Inuit and a variety of Native American groups. Today, early Alaskans are divided into several main groups: the Southeastern Coastal Indians (the Tlingit, Haida, and Tsimshian), the Athabascans, the Aleut, and the two groups of Eskimos, the Inupiat and the Yup'ik.

The coastal migrants from Asia were probably the first wave of humans to cross the Bering land bridge in western Alaska, and many of them initially settled in the interior of what is now Canada. The Tlingit were the most numerous of this group, claiming most of the coastal Panhandle by the time of European contact and are the northernmost of the group of advanced cultures of the Pacific Northwest Coast renowned for its complex art and political systems and the ceremonial and legal system known as the potlatch. The southern portion of Prince of Wales Island was settled by the Haidas fleeing persecution by other Haidas from the Queen Charlotte Islands (which are now named Haida Gwaii and part of British Columbia). The Aleuts settled the islands of the Aleutian chain approximately 10,000 years ago.

Cultural and subsistence practices varied widely among native groups, who were spread across vast geographical distances.

== 18th century ==
=== Early Russian settlement ===
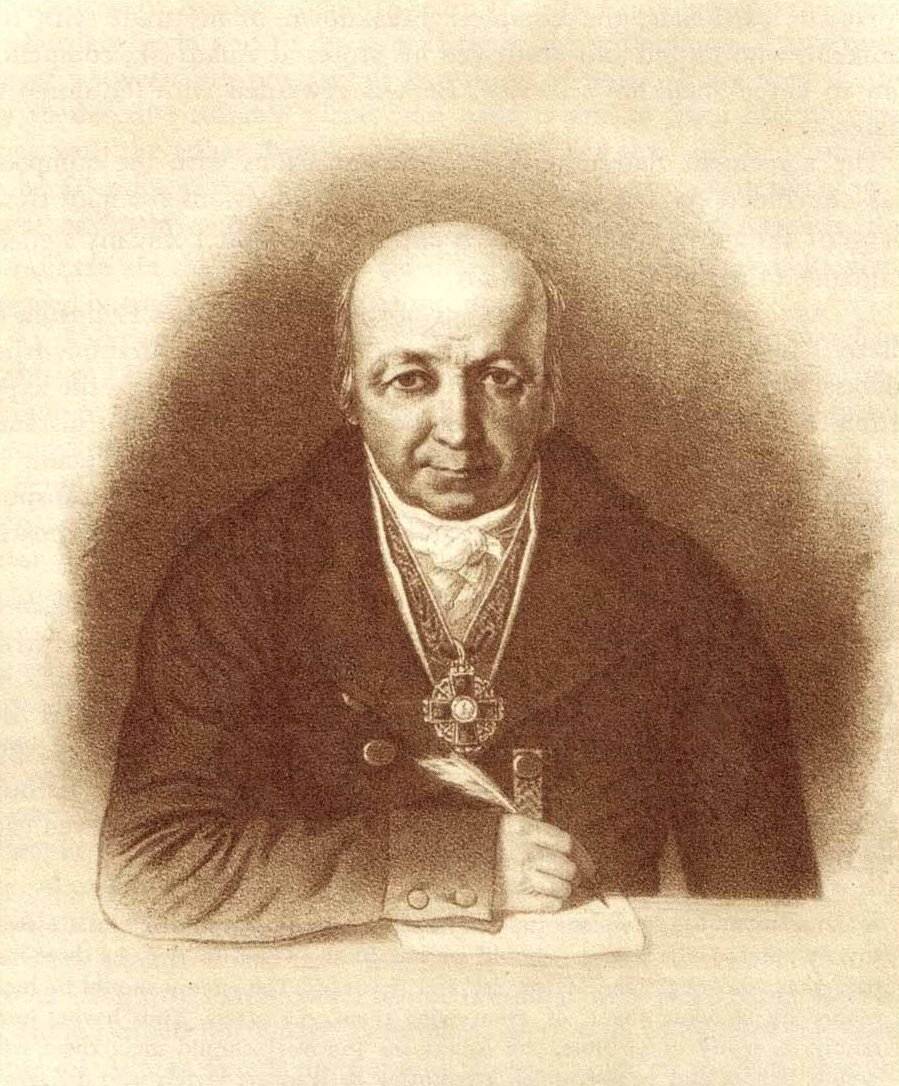
Aleksandr Baranov, "Lord of Alaska"

Russian expeditions of exploration reached Alaska by the early 18th century, and colonial traders (especially fur-traders) followed. On some islands and parts of the Alaskan peninsula, groups of Russian traders proved capable of relatively peaceful coexistence with the local inhabitants. Other groups could not manage the tensions and perpetrated exactions. Hostages were taken, individuals were enslaved, families were split up, and other individuals were forced to leave their villages and settle elsewhere. In addition, during the first two generations of Russian contact, eighty percent of the Aleut population died of Old World diseases, against which they had no immunity.

In 1784 Grigory Ivanovich Shelikhov arrived in Three Saints Bay on Kodiak Island, operating the fur-trading Shelikhov-Golikov Company. Shelikhov and his group killed hundreds of indigenous Koniag, then founded the first permanent Russian settlement in Alaska – on the island's Three Saints Bay. By 1788 Shelikhov and others had established a number of Russian settlements over a large region, including the mainland areas around Cook Inlet.

The Russians had gained control of the habitats of the most valuable sea-otters, the Kurilian-Kamchatkan and Aleutian sea-otters. Their fur was thicker, glossier, and blacker than that of sea-otters on the Pacific Northwest coast and in California. The Russians, therefore, advanced southwards along the Pacific coast only after the superior varieties of sea-otters had become depleted, around 1788. The Russian entry to the Northwest Coast was slow, however, due to a shortage of ships and sailors. Russians reached Yakutat Bay in 1794 and built the settlement of Slavorossiya there in 1795. James Shields, a British employee of the Golikov-Shelikhov Company, reconnoitred the coast as far as the Queen Charlotte Islands. In 1795 Alexander Baranov, hired in 1790 to manage Shelikhov's fur enterprise, sailed into Sitka Sound and claimed it for Russia. Hunting-parties arrived in the following years, and by 1800 three-quarters of Russian America's sea-otter skins were coming from the Sitka Sound area. In July 1799 Baranov returned on the brig Oryol and established the settlement of Arkhangelsk. Destroyed by Tlingits in 1802 but rebuilt nearby in 1804, it became Novo-Arkhangelsk (Russian: Новоархангельск, lit. 'New Archangel'). It soon become the primary settlement and colonial capital of Russian America. (After the United States purchased Alaska in 1867, Novoarkhangelsk was renamed Sitka and became the first capital of Alaska Territory.)

==== Missionary activity ====
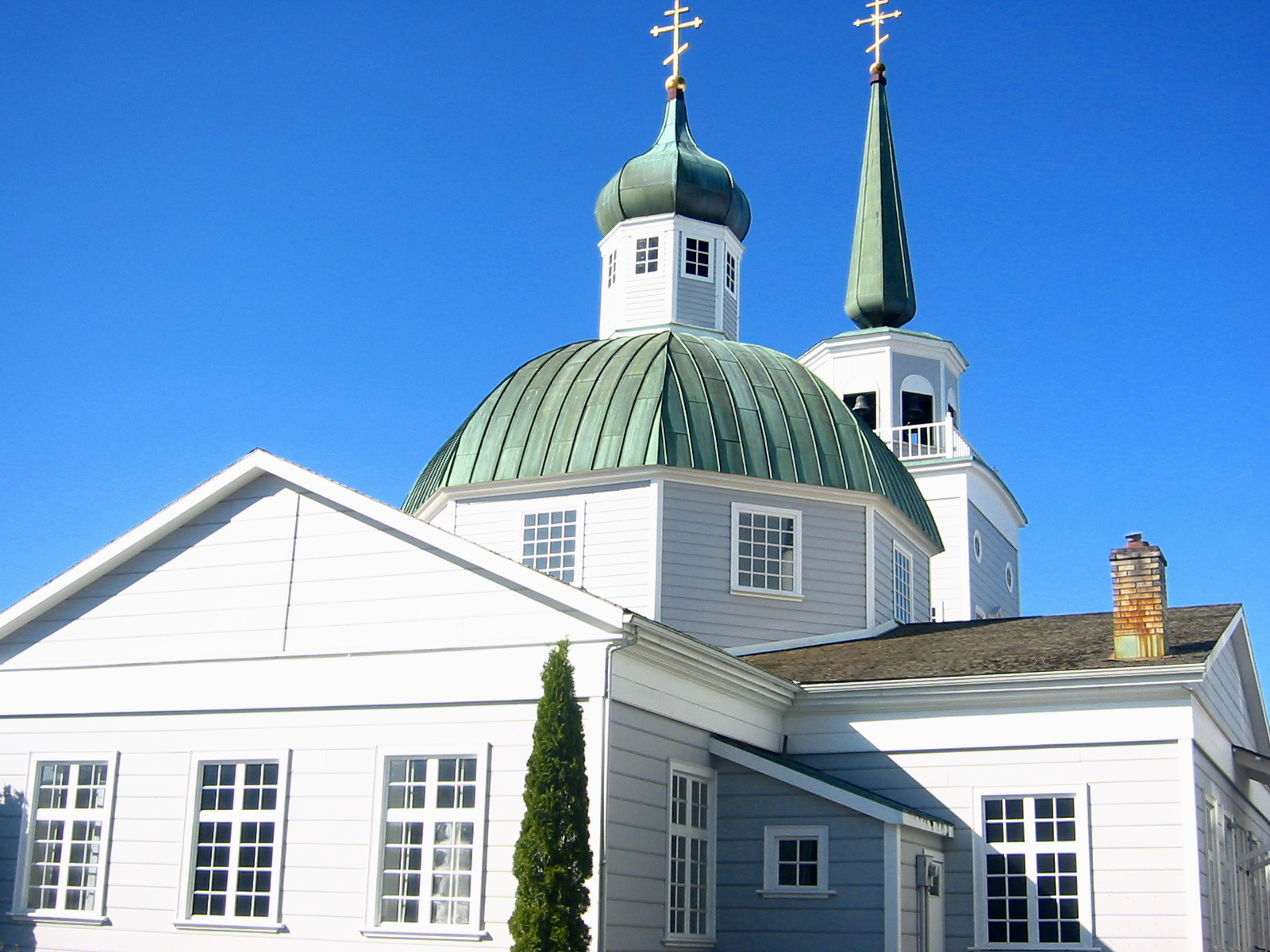
St. Michael's Cathedral in Sitka. The original structure, built in 1848, burned down in a fire on January 2, 1966. The cathedral was rebuilt from plans of the original structure and contains artifacts rescued from the fire.

Russian fur-traders informally introduced the Russian Orthodox church (with its rituals and sacred texts translated into Aleut at a very early stage) in the 1740s–1780s. During his settlement of Three Saints Bay in 1784, Shelikov introduced the first resident missionaries and clergymen. This missionary activity would continue into the 19th century, ultimately becoming the most visible trace of the Russian colonial period in present-day Alaska.

=== Spanish claims ===
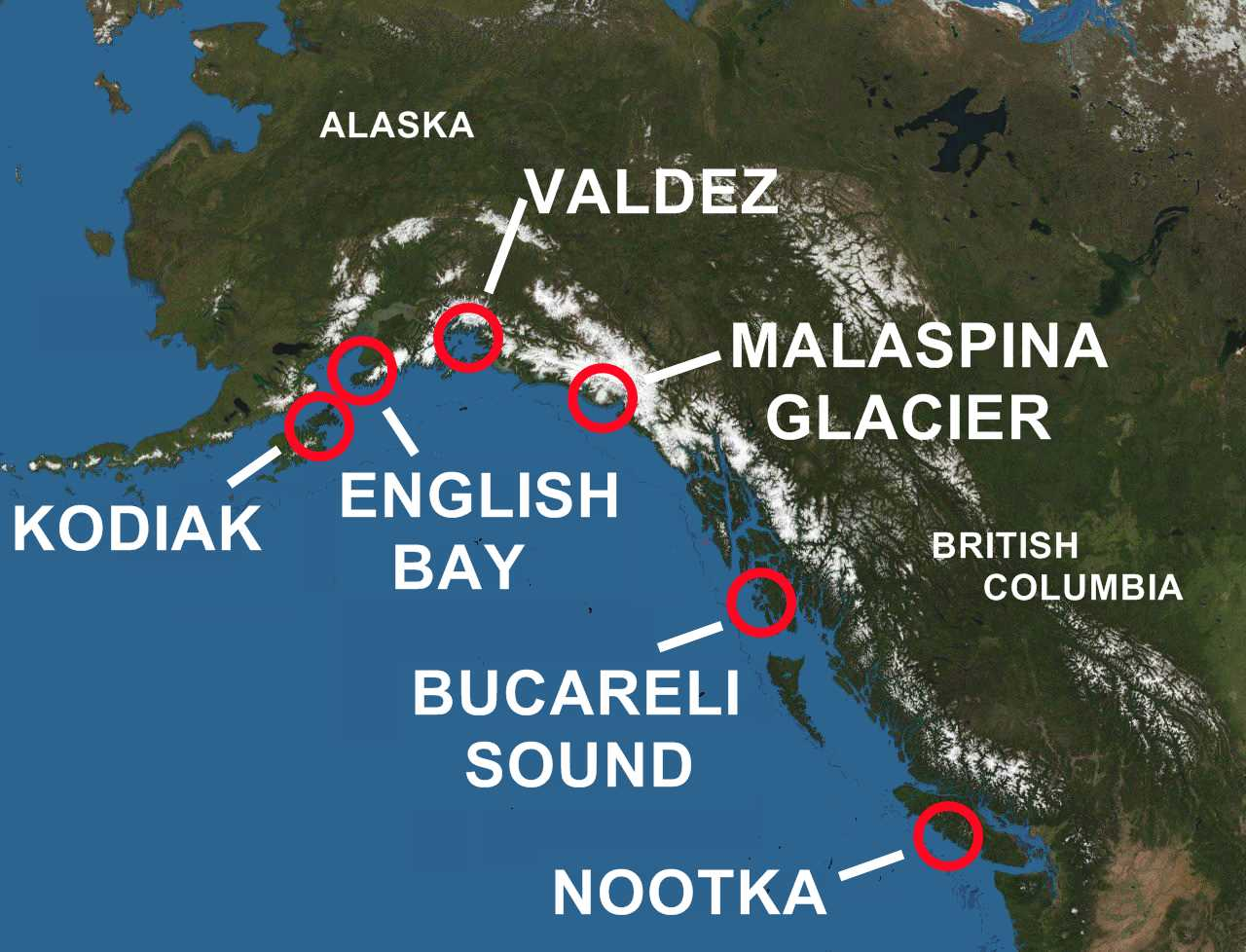
Spanish contact in British Columbia and Alaska

Spanish claims to the Alaska region dated to the papal bull of 1493, but never involved colonization, forts, or settlements. Instead, Madrid sent out various naval expeditions to explore the area and to claim it for Spain. In 1775 Bruno de Hezeta led an expedition; the Sonora, under Bodega y Quadra, ultimately reached latitude 58° north, entered Sitka Sound and formally claimed the region for Spain. The 1779 expedition of Ignacio de Arteaga and Bodega y Quadra reached Port Etches on Hinchinbrook Island, and entered Prince William Sound. They reached a latitude of 61° north, the most northern point attained by Spain.

In 1788 Esteban José Martínez and Gonzalo López de Haro visited Russian settlements at Unalaska.

The Nootka Crisis of 1789 almost led to a war between Britain and Spain: Britain rejected Spanish claims to lands in British Columbia and Spain seized some British ships. The crisis was resolved in Madrid by the Nootka Conventions of 1790–1794, which provided that traders of both Britain and Spain could operate on the northwest coast, that the captured British ships would be returned and an indemnity paid. This marked a victory for Britain, and Spain effectively withdrew from the North Pacific. It transferred its claims in the region to the United States in the Adams–Onís Treaty of 1819. Today, Spain's Alaskan legacy endures as little more than a few place names, among these the Malaspina Glacier and the towns of Valdez and Cordova.

=== Britain's presence ===
British settlements at the time in Alaska consisted of a few scattered trading outposts, with most settlers arriving by sea. Captain James Cook, midway through his third and final voyage of exploration in 1778, sailed along the west coast of North America aboard HMS Resolution, from then-Spanish California all the way to the Bering Strait. During the trip he discovered what became known as Cook Inlet (named in honor of Cook in 1794 by George Vancouver, who had served under his command) in Alaskan waters. The Bering Strait proved to be impassable, although the Resolution and its companion ship HMS Discovery made several attempts to sail through it. The British ships left the straits to return to Hawaii in 1779.

Cook's expedition spurred the British to increase their sailings along the northwest coast (the north-eastern coast of the Pacific), following in the wake of the Spanish. From 1791 to 1795, Vancouver would lead his own expedition to map the Pacific coastline from the Cook Inlet down to Spanish California. Alaska-based posts owned by the Hudson's Bay Company operated at Fort Yukon, on the Yukon River, Fort Durham (a.k.a. Fort Taku) at the mouth of the Taku River, and Fort Stikine, near the mouth of the Stikine River (associated with Wrangell throughout the early-19th century).

== 19th century ==
=== Later Russian settlement and the Russian-American Company (1799–1867) ===
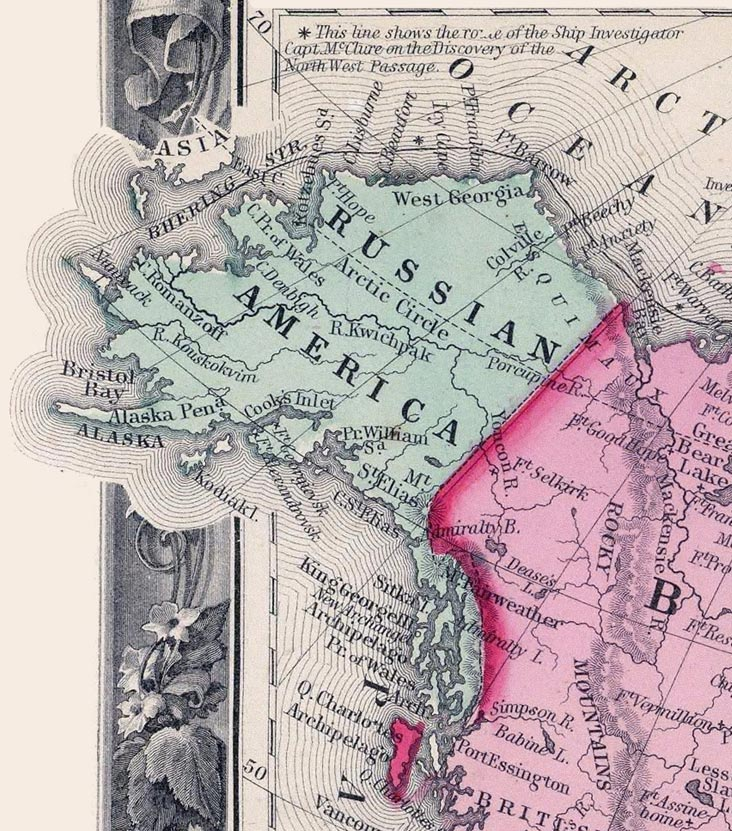
1860 map of Russian America

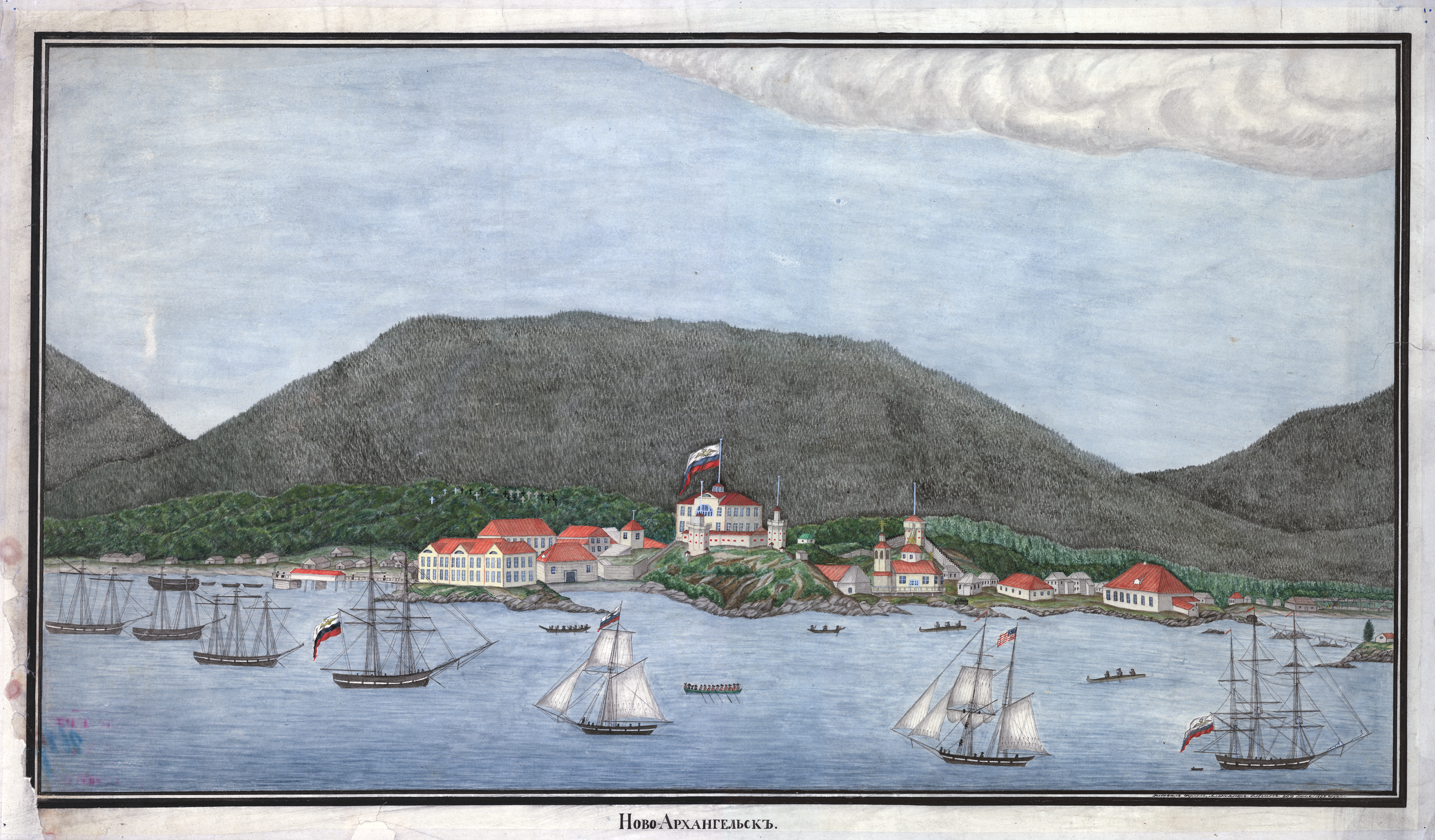
The Russian-American Company's capital at New Archangel (present-day Sitka, Alaska) in 1837

In 1799, Shelikhov's son-in-law, Nikolay Petrovich Rezanov, acquired a monopoly on the American fur trade from emperor Paul I and formed the Russian-American Company. As part of the deal, the emperor expected the company to establish new settlements in Alaska and carry out an expanded colonization program.

By 1804, Alexander Baranov, now manager of the Russian–American Company, had consolidated the company's hold on the American fur trade following his victory over the local Tlingit clan at the Battle of Sitka. Despite these efforts the Russians never fully colonized Alaska. The Russian monopoly on trade was also being weakened by the Hudson's Bay Company, which set up a post on the southern edge of Russian America in 1833.

In 1818 management of the Russian-American Company was turned over to the Imperial Russian Navy and the Ukase of 1821 banned foreigners from participating in the Alaskan economy. It soon entered into the Anglo-Russian Convention of 1825 which allowed British merchants to trade in Alaska. The convention also settled most of the border between Alaska and British North America.

The Russo-American Treaty of 1824, which banned American merchants above 54° 40' north latitude, was widely ignored and the Russians' hold on Alaska weakened further.

At the height of Russian America, the Russian population reached 700.

Although the mid–19th century was not a good time for Russians in Alaska, conditions improved for the coastal Alaska Natives who had survived contact. The Tlingits were never conquered and continued to wage war on the Russians into the 1850s. The Aleuts, though faced with a decreasing population in the 1840s, ultimately rebounded.

=== Alaska purchase ===
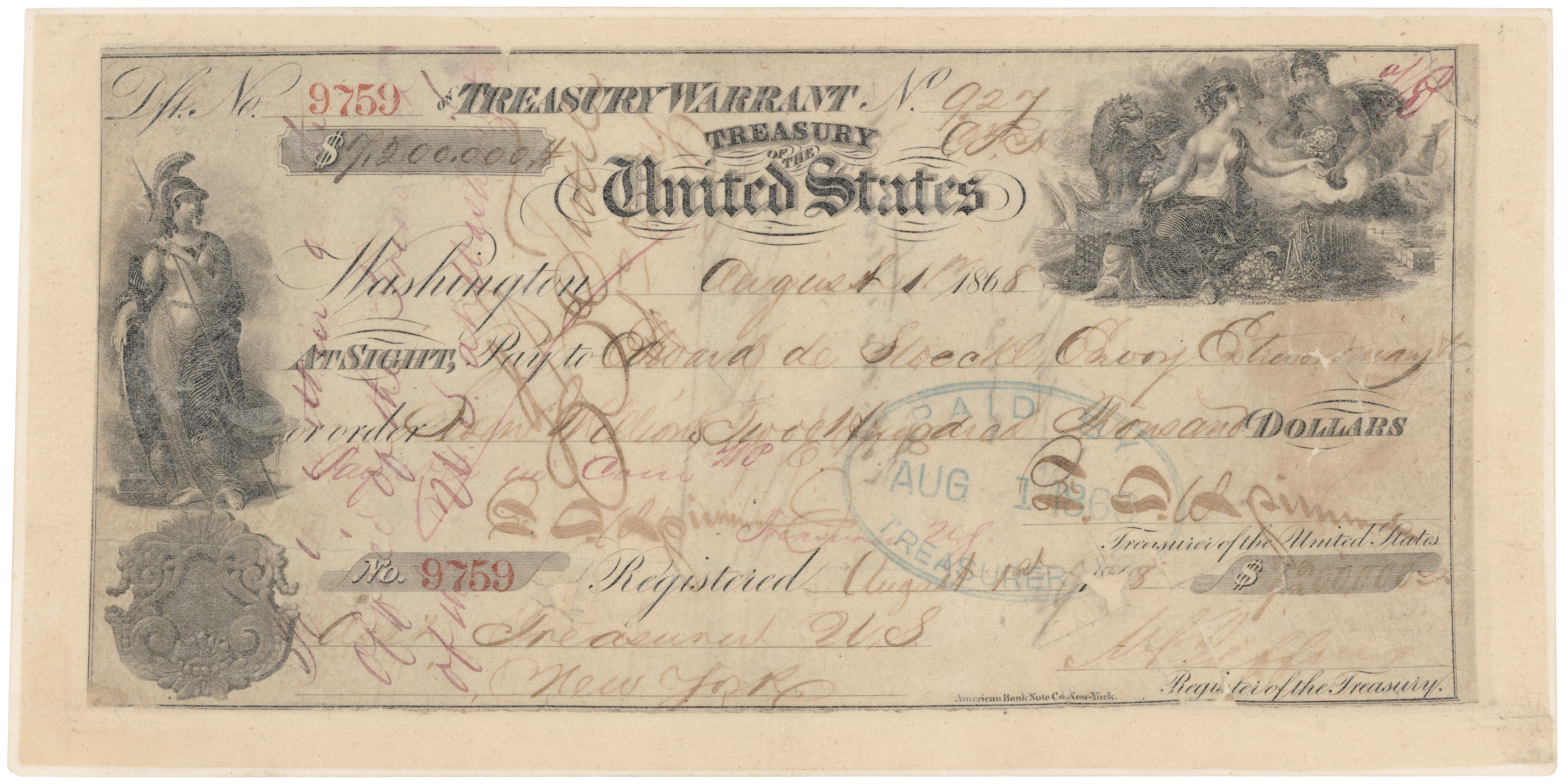
The check that paid for Alaska

Financial difficulties in Russia, the low profits of trade with Alaskan settlement, and the important desire to keep Alaska out of British hands all contributed to Russia's willingness to sell its possessions in North America. At the instigation of U.S. Secretary of State William Seward, the United States Senate approved the purchase of Alaska from Russia for US$7.2 million on August 1, 1867 (equivalent to approximately $166M in 2025). This purchase was popularly known in the U.S. as "Seward's Folly", "Seward's Icebox," or "Andrew Johnson's Polar Bear Garden", and was unpopular among some people at the time. Later discovery of gold and oil would show it to be a worthwhile one. Scholars debate whether the purchase of Alaska was financially profitable for the federal Treasury itself, apart from its benefits to Alaskans and to businesses, and to national defense.

=== The Department of Alaska (1867–1884) ===
The United States flag was raised on October 18, 1867, now called Alaska Day, and the region changed from the Julian calendar to the Gregorian calendar. Therefore, for residents, Friday, October 6, 1867, was followed by Friday, October 18, 1867—two Fridays in a row because of the 12-day shift in the calendar minus one day for the date-line shift.

During the Department era, from 1867 to 1884, Alaska was variously under the jurisdiction of the U.S. Army (until 1877), the United States Department of the Treasury from 1877 to 1879, and the U.S. Navy from 1879 to 1884. Civil administration of Alaska began in 1877 under the United States Treasury Department. A Collector of Customs was appointed by the president of the United States. The collector was the highest-ranking official of the United States government in Alaska and de facto governor. Henry C. DeAhna, a former Union Army officer and Mottrom D. Ball, a former Confederate Army officer, were the first individuals to serve as Collector of Customs.

When Alaska was first purchased, most of its land remained unexplored. In 1865, Western Union laid a telegraph line across Alaska to the Bering Strait where it would connect, under water, with an Asian line. It also conducted the first scientific studies of the region and produced the first map of the entire Yukon River. The Alaska Commercial Company and the military also contributed to the growing exploration of Alaska in the last decades of the 19th century, building trading posts along the Interior's many rivers.

=== District of Alaska (1884–1912) ===
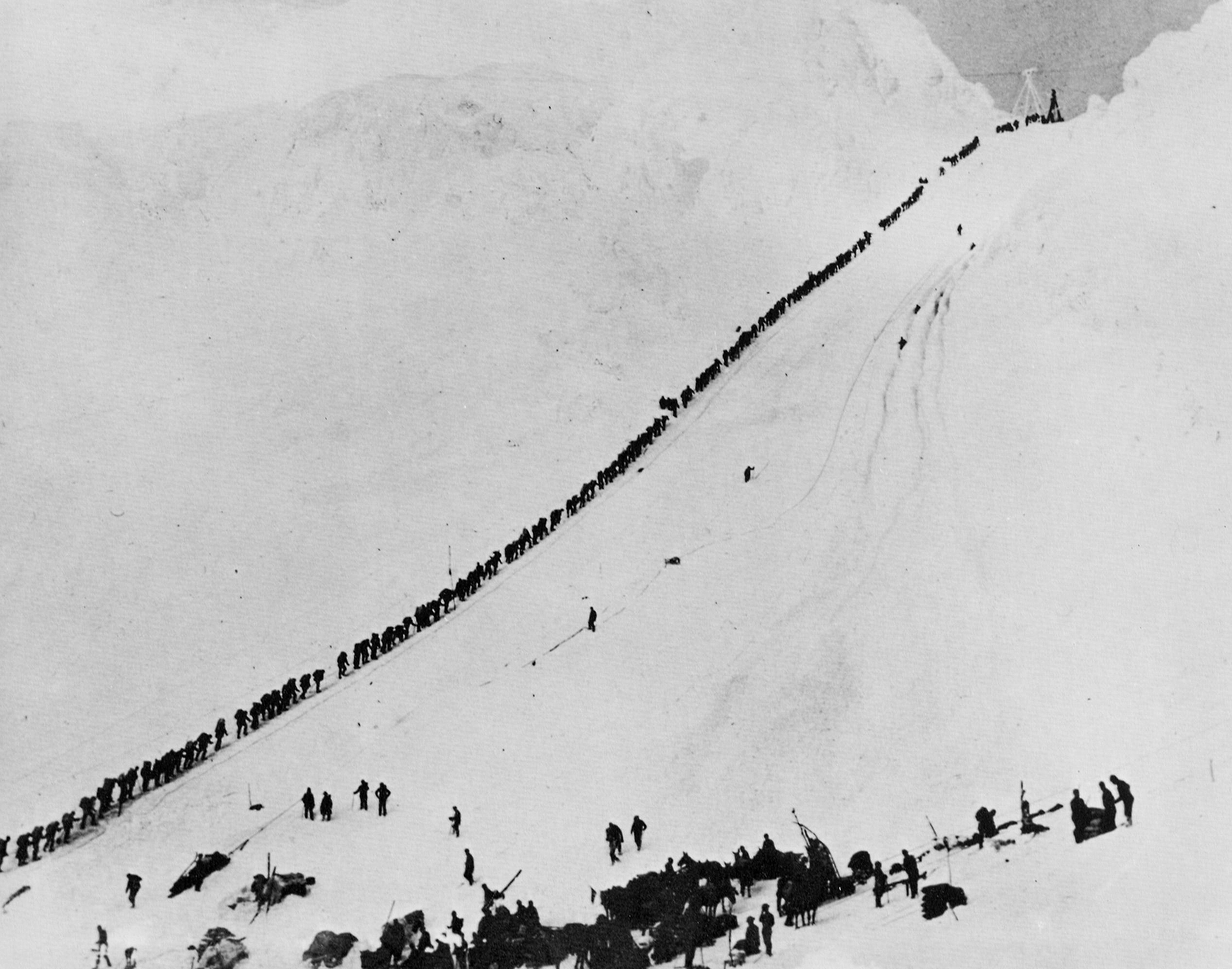
Miners and prospectors climb the Chilkoot Trail during the Klondike Gold Rush.

In 1884, the region was organized and the name was changed from the Department of Alaska to the District of Alaska. At the time, legislators in Washington, D.C., were occupied with post-Civil War reconstruction issues, and had little time to devote to Alaska. In 1896, the discovery of gold in Yukon Territory in neighboring Canada, brought many thousands of miners and new settlers to Alaska, and very quickly ended the nation's four year economic depression. Although it was uncertain whether gold would also be found in Alaska, Alaska greatly profited because it was along the easiest transportation route to the Yukon goldfields. Numerous new cities, such as Skagway, Alaska, owe their existence to a gold rush in Canada. Soapy Smith, a crime boss confidence man who operated the largest criminal empire in gold rush era Alaska, was shot down by vigilantes in the famed Shootout on Juneau Wharf. He is known as "Alaska's Outlaw."

In 1899, gold was found in Alaska itself in Nome, and several towns subsequently began to be built, such as Fairbanks and Ruby. In 1902, the Alaska Railroad began to be built, which would connect from Seward to Fairbanks by 1914, though Alaska still does not have a railroad connecting it to the lower 48 states today. Still, an overland route was built, cutting transportation times to the contiguous states by days. The industries of copper mining, fishing, and canning began to become popular in the early 20th century, with 10 canneries in some major towns.

In 1903, a boundary dispute with Canada was finally resolved.

By the turn of the 20th century, commercial fishing was gaining a foothold in the Aleutian Islands. Packing houses salted cod and herring, and salmon canneries were opened. Another commercial occupation, whaling, continued with no regard for over-hunting. They pushed the bowhead whales to the edge of extinction for the oil in their tissue. The Aleuts soon suffered severe problems due to the depletion of fur seals and sea otters which they needed for survival. As well as requiring the flesh for food, they also used the skins to cover their boats, without which they could not hunt. The Americans also expanded into the Interior and Arctic Alaska, exploiting the furbearers, fish, and other game on which Natives depended.

== 20th century ==
=== Alaska Territory (1912–1959) ===
When Congress passed the Second Organic Act in 1912, Alaska was reorganized, and renamed the Territory of Alaska. By 1916, its population was about 58,000. James Wickersham, a Delegate to Congress, introduced Alaska's first statehood bill, but it failed due to the small population and lack of interest from Alaskans. Even President Warren G. Harding's visit in 1923 could not create widespread interest in statehood. Under the conditions of the Second Organic Act, Alaska had been split into four divisions. The most populous of the divisions, whose capital was Juneau, wondered if it could become a separate state from the other three. Government control was a primary concern, with the territory having 52 federal agencies governing it.

Then, in 1920, the Jones Act required U.S.-flagged vessels to be built in the United States, owned by U.S. citizens, and documented under the laws of the United States. All goods entering or leaving Alaska had to be transported by American carriers and shipped to Seattle prior to further shipment, making Alaska dependent on Washington. The U.S. Supreme Court ruled that the provision of the Constitution saying one state should not hold sway over another's commerce did not apply because Alaska was only a territory. The prices Seattle shipping businesses charged began to rise to take advantage of the situation. This situation created an atmosphere of enmity among Alaskans who watched the wealth being generated by their labors flowing into the hands of Seattle business holdings.

In July 1923 Warren Harding became the first sitting president to visit Alaska as part of his Pacific Northwest Voyage of Understanding. Harding arrived by boat from Seattle and made nine stops in the Territory via train which went from Seward to Fairbanks. On July 15 Harding drove in a golden railroad spike at Nenana. The train car in which he rode now sits in Fairbanks' Pioneer Park.

The Depression caused prices of fish and copper, which were vital to Alaska's economy at the time, to decline. Wages were dropped and the workforce decreased by more than half. In 1935, President Franklin D. Roosevelt thought Americans from agricultural areas could be transferred to Alaska's Matanuska-Susitna Valley for a fresh chance at agricultural self-sustainment. Colonists were largely from northern states, such as Michigan, Wisconsin, and Minnesota under the belief that only those who grew up with climates similar to that of Alaska's could handle settler life there. The United Congo Improvement Association asked the president to settle 400 African American farmers in Alaska, saying that the territory would offer full political rights, but racial prejudice and the belief that only those from northern states would make suitable colonists caused the proposal to fail.

The exploration and settlement of Alaska would not have been possible without the development of the aircraft, which allowed for the influx of settlers into the state's interior, and rapid transportation of people and supplies throughout. However, due to the unfavorable weather conditions of the state, and high ratio of pilots-to-population, over 1700 aircraft wreck sites are scattered throughout its domain. Numerous wrecks also trace their origins to the military build-up of the state during both World War II and the Cold War.

- See also History of aviation in Alaska

==== World War II ====
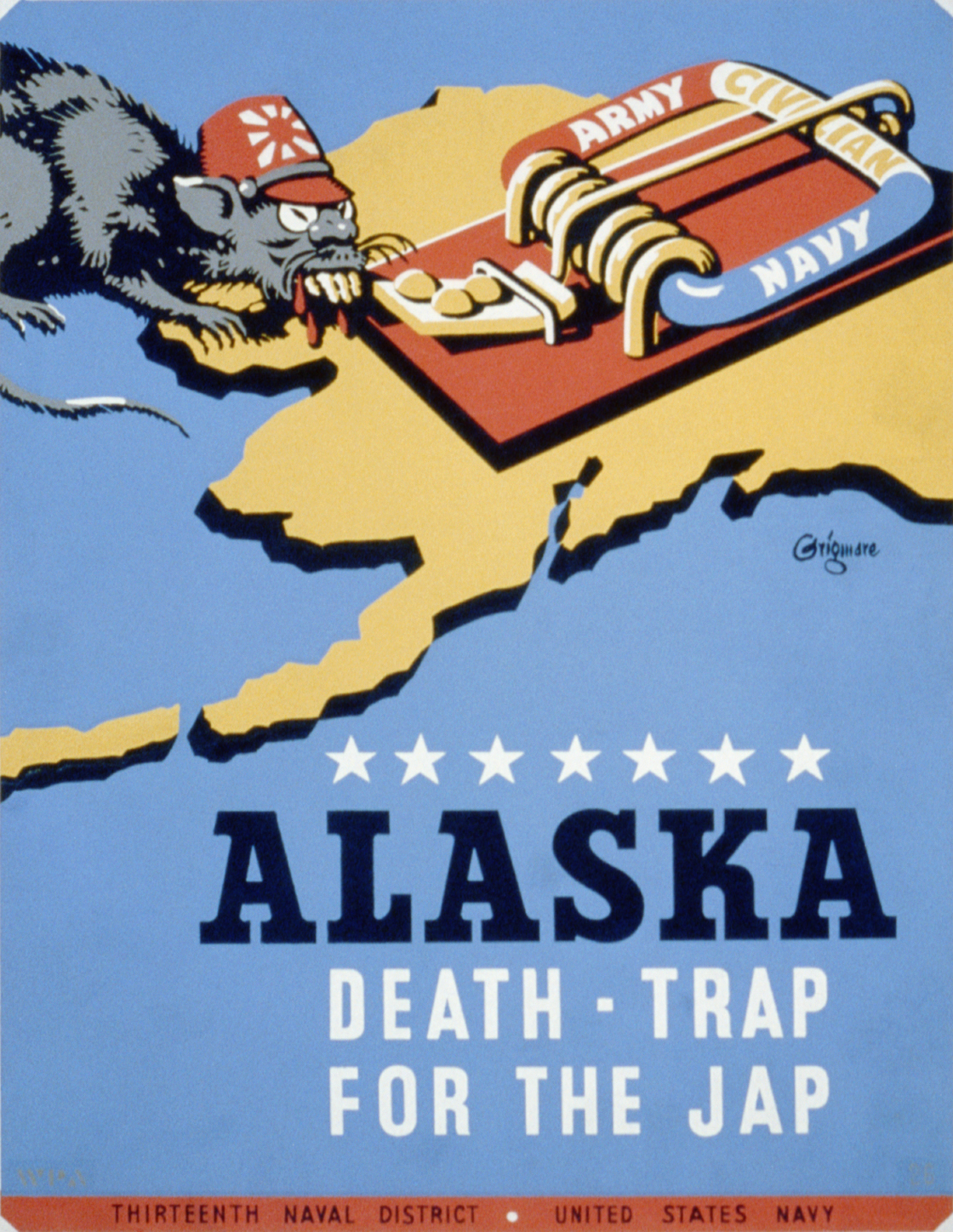
Propaganda poster, World War II, depicting Alaska as a death trap for Japan.

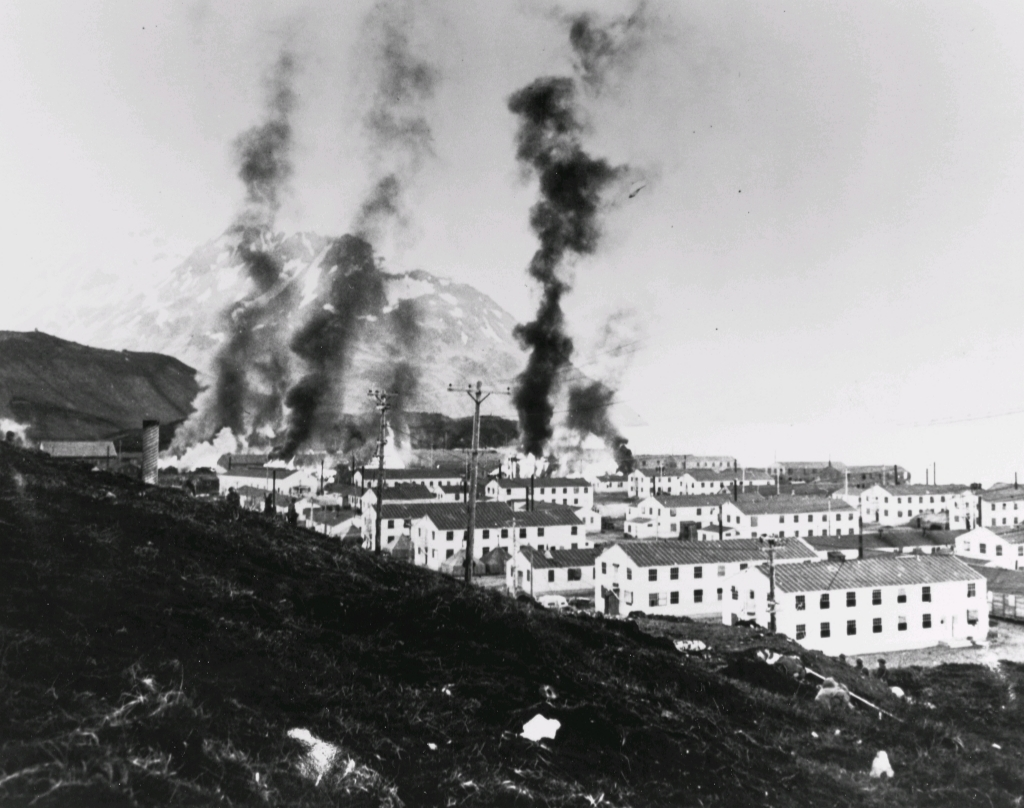
Buildings burning after the first Japanese attack on Dutch Harbor, June 3, 1942.

During World War II, two of the outer Aleutian Islands—Attu and Kiska—were invaded and occupied by Japanese troops. They were the only parts of the continental United States to be invaded and occupied by an enemy nation during the war. Their recovery became a matter of national pride.

On June 3, 1942, the Japanese launched an air attack on Dutch Harbor, a U.S. naval base on Unalaska Island, but were repelled by U.S. forces. A few days later, the Japanese landed on the islands of Kiska and Attu, where they overwhelmed Attu villagers. The villagers were taken to Japan, where they were interned for the remainder of the war. Aleuts from the Pribilofs and Aleutian villages were evacuated by the United States to Southeast Alaska. Many suffered during their two years internment there, and the federal government, charged with their care, provided inadequate health care, food, and shelter.

Attu was regained in May 1943 after two weeks of intense fighting and 3,829 American casualties: 549 were killed, 1,148 were injured, 1,200 had severe cold injuries, 614 succumbed to disease, and 318 died of miscellaneous causes. The U.S. then turned its attention to the other occupied island, Kiska. From June through August, a multitude of bombs were dropped on the tiny island, though the Japanese ultimately escaped via transport ships. After the war, the Native Attuans who had survived their internment were resettled to Atka by the federal government, which considered their home villages too remote to defend.

In 1942, the Alaska–Canada Military Highway was completed, in part to form an overland supply route to the Soviet Union on the other side of the Bering Strait. Running from Dawson Creek, British Columbia to Delta Junction, Alaska, the road connected the contiguous United States to Alaska across Canada. The construction of military bases, such as the Adak base, contributed to the population growth of some Alaskan cities. Anchorage almost doubled in size, from 4,200 people in 1940 to 8,000 in 1945.

=== Statehood ===
By the turn of the 20th century, a movement pushing for Alaska statehood began, but in the contiguous 48 states, legislators were worried that Alaska's population was too sparse, distant, and isolated, and its economy was too unstable for it to be a worthwhile addition to the United States. World War II and the Japanese invasion highlighted Alaska's strategic importance, and the issue of statehood was taken more seriously, but it was the discovery of oil at Swanson River on the Kenai Peninsula that dispelled the image of Alaska as a weak, dependent region. President Dwight D. Eisenhower signed the Alaska Statehood Act into United States law on July 4, 1958, which paved the way for Alaska's admission into the Union on January 3, 1959. Juneau, the territorial capital, continued as state capital, and William A. Egan was sworn in as the first governor.

Alaska does not have counties, unlike every other American state except Louisiana. (Louisiana has parishes). Instead, it is divided into 16 boroughs and one "unorganized borough" made up of all land not within any borough. Boroughs have organized area-wide governments, but within the unorganized borough, where there is no such government, services are provided by the state. In the unorganized borough, cities or tribal organizations often provide community services while the state government provides education services through the Regional Educational Attendance Areas (REAA).

Pioneering conditions in Alaska awoke ingenuity leading to invention of the Alaskan sawmill, an attachment to a chainsaw letting it be used to cut a felled tree into neat parallel-sided planks or boards.

==== 1964 earthquake ====
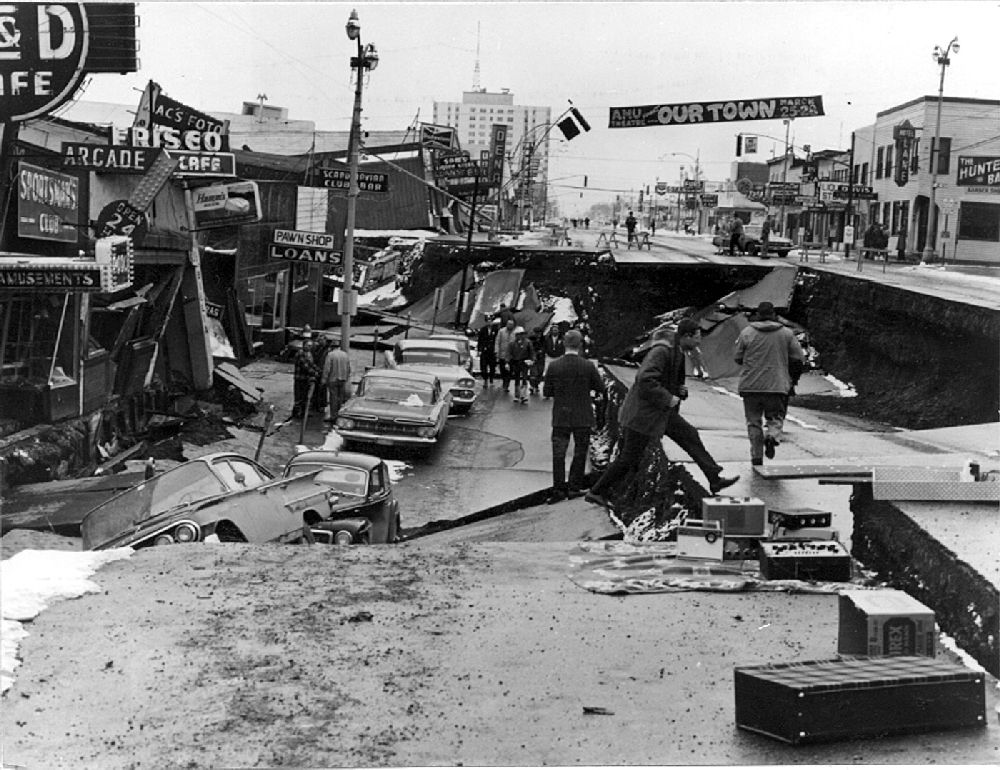
Earthquake damage in Anchorage

On March 27, 1964, the Good Friday earthquake struck South-central Alaska, churning the earth for four minutes with a magnitude of 9.2. The earthquake was one of the most powerful ever recorded and killed 139 people. Most of them were drowned by the tsunamis that tore apart the towns of Valdez and Chenega. Throughout the Prince William Sound region, towns and ports were destroyed and land was uplifted or shoved downward. The uplift destroyed salmon streams, as the fish could no longer jump the various newly created barriers to reach their spawning grounds. Ports at Valdez and Cordova were beyond repair, and the fires destroyed what the mudslides had not. At Valdez, an Alaska Steamship Company ship was lifted by a huge wave over the docks and out to sea, but most hands survived. At Turnagain Arm, off Cook Inlet, the incoming water destroyed trees and caused cabins to sink into the mud. On Kodiak, a tsunami wiped out the villages of Afognak, Old Harbor, and Kaguyak and damaged other communities, while Seward lost its harbor. Despite the extent of the catastrophe, Alaskans rebuilt many of the communities.

=== North to the Future ===
"North to the Future" is the official state motto of Alaska, adopted in 1967 for the centennial of the Alaska Purchase. As one of the events leading up to the celebration, the Alaska Centennial Commission sponsored a contest in 1963 to come up with a centennial motto and emblem that would express the unique character of the State of Alaska. They offered a $300.00 (which is about $3000 in 2023 dollars) prize to the winning entry. 761 entries were received by the commission. In December 1963, the commission announced that they had selected Juneau journalist Richard Peter's suggestion. Bob Marshall stated that the motto "...is a reminder that beyond the horizon of urban clutter there is a Great Land beneath our flag that can provide a new tomorrow for this century's 'huddled masses yearning to breathe free'." The motto represents a visionary optimism for a state filled with promise; promoting the State of Alaska by advising that the future lies with the next-to-the-last United States star located to the north of the Lower 48.

=== 1968 – present: oil and land politics ===
==== Oil discovery, the Alaska Native Claims Settlement Act (ANCSA), and the Trans-Alaska Pipeline ====
The 1968 discovery of oil on the North Slope's Prudhoe Bay—which would turn out to have the most recoverable oil of any field in the United States—would change Alaska's political landscape for decades.

This discovery catapulted the issue of Native land ownership into the headlines. In the mid-1960s, Alaska Natives from many tribal groups had united in an effort to gain title to lands wrested from them by Europeans, but the government had responded slowly before the Prudhoe Bay discovery. The government finally took action when permitting for a pipeline crossing the state, necessary to get Alaskan oil to market, was stalled pending the settlement of Native land claims.

In 1971, with major petroleum dollars on the line, the Alaska Native Claims Settlement Act was signed into law by Richard Nixon. Under the Act, Natives relinquished aboriginal claims to their lands in exchange for access to 44 million acres (180,000 km^{2}) of land and payment of $963 million. The settlement was divided among regional, urban, and village corporations, which managed their funds with varying degrees of success.

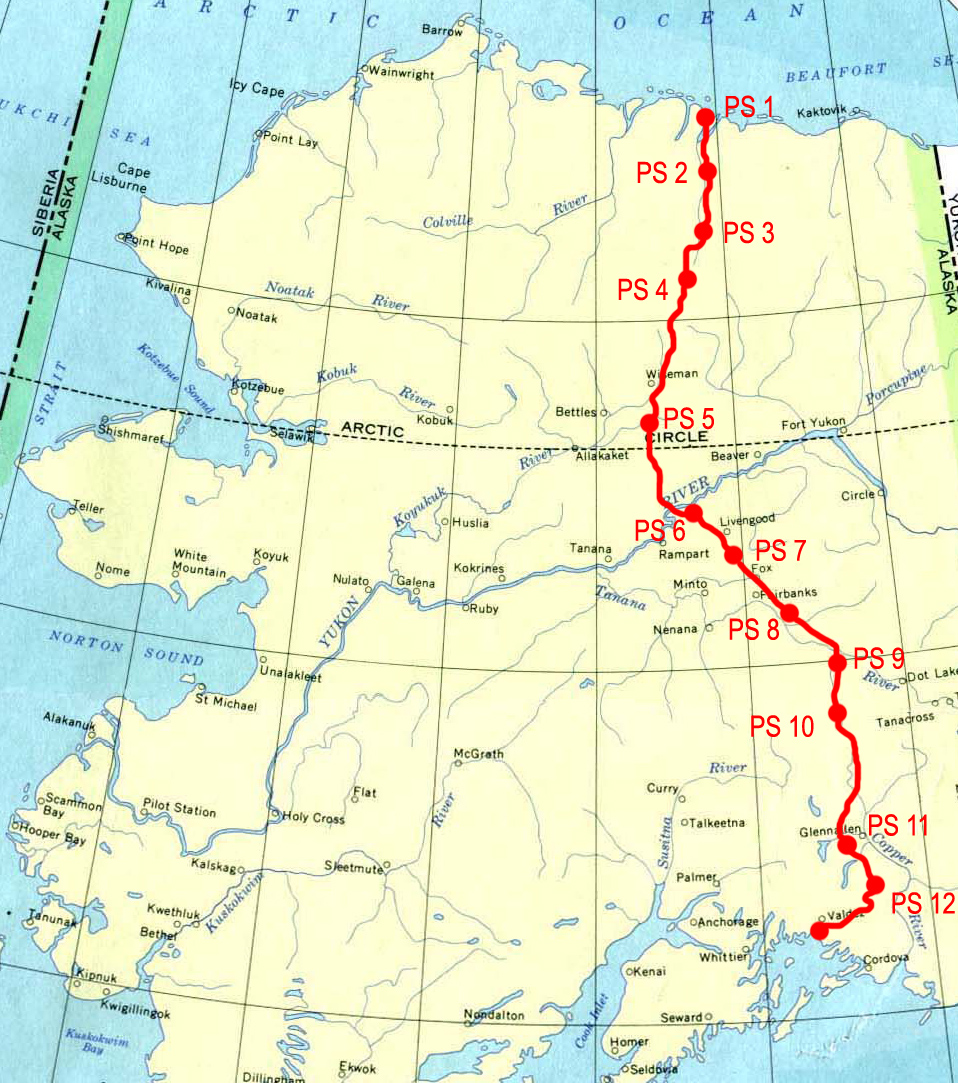
Map of the Trans-Alaska Pipeline

Though a pipeline from the North Slope to the nearest ice-free port, almost 800 miles (1,300 km) to the south, was the only way to get Alaska's oil to market, significant engineering challenges lay ahead. Between the North Slope and Valdez, there were active fault lines, three mountain ranges, miles of unstable, boggy ground underlain with frost, and migration paths of caribou and moose. The Trans-Alaska Pipeline was ultimately completed in 1977 at a total cost of $8 billion.

The pipeline allowed an oil bonanza to take shape. Per capita incomes rose throughout the state, with virtually every community benefiting. State leaders were determined that this boom would not end like the fur and gold booms, in an economic bust as soon as the resource had disappeared. In 1976, the state's constitution was amended to establish the Alaska Permanent Fund, in which a quarter of all mineral lease proceeds is invested. Income from the fund is used to pay annual dividends to all residents who qualify, to increase the fund's principal as a hedge against inflation, and to provide funds for the state legislature. Since 1993, the fund has produced more money than the Prudhoe Bay oil fields, whose production is diminishing. In March 2005, the fund's value was over $30 billion.

==== Environmentalism, the Exxon Valdez, ADEC, and ANWR ====
Oil production was not the only economic value of Alaska's land, however. In the second half of the 20th century, Alaska discovered tourism as an important source of revenue. Tourism became popular after World War II, when military personnel stationed in the region returned home praising its natural splendor. The Alcan Highway, built during the war, and the Alaska Marine Highway System, completed in 1963, made the state more accessible than before. Tourism became increasingly important in Alaska, and today over 1.4 million people visit the state each year.

With tourism more vital to the economy, environmentalism also rose in importance. The Alaska National Interest Lands Conservation Act (ANILCA) of 1980 added 53.7 million acres (217,000 km^{2}) to the National Wildlife Refuge system, parts of 25 rivers to the National Wild and Scenic Rivers system, 3.3 million acres (13,000 km^{2}) to National Forest lands, and 43.6 million acres (176,000 km^{2}) to National Park land. Because of the Act, Alaska now contains two-thirds of all American national parklands. Today, more than half of Alaskan land is owned by the Federal Government.

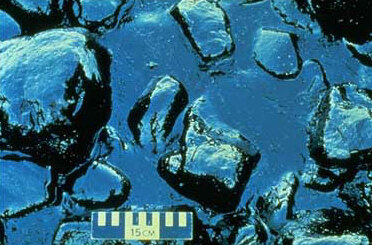
Oil pooled on rocks on the shore of Prince William Sound after the oil spill.

The possible environmental repercussions of oil production became clear in the Exxon Valdez oil spill of 1989. On March 24, the tanker Exxon Valdez ran aground in Prince William Sound, releasing 11 million gallons of crude oil into the water, spreading along 1,100 miles (1,800 km) of shoreline. According to the U.S. Fish and Wildlife Service, at least 300,000 sea birds, 2,000 otters, and other marine animals died because of the spill. Exxon spent US$2 billion on cleaning up in the first year alone. Exxon, working with state and federal agencies, continued its cleanup into the early 1990s. Government studies show that the oil and the cleaning process itself did long-term harm to the ecology of the Sound, interfering with the reproduction of birds and animals in ways that still aren't fully understood. Prince William Sound seems to have recuperated, but scientists still dispute the extent of the recovery. In a civil settlement, Exxon agreed to pay $900 million in ten annual payments, plus an additional $100 million for newly discovered damages. In a class action suit against Exxon, a jury awarded punitive damages of US$5 billion, but as of 2008 no money has been disbursed and appellate litigation continues.

Alaska Dept. of Environmental Conservation v. EPA, 540 U.S. 461 (2004), is a US Supreme Court case clarifying the scope of state environmental regulators and the Environmental Protection Agency (EPA). In a 5–4 decision, the Supreme Court found the EPA has authority to overrule state agency decisions under the Clean Air Act that a company is using the "best available controlling technology" to prevent pollution.

In 1998, Teck Cominco Alaska, requested a permit to build an additional generator and to modify an existing generator at its mines in order to expand zinc extraction. In May 1999, the Alaska Department of Environmental Conservation (ADEC) issued the permit, and a technical report concluded that "Low NOx" technology was BACT and identified "selective catalytic reduction" (SCR) as the best control technology. The EPA opposed the permit and objected that the ADEC had identified SCR as the best available control technology but failed to require it as BACT.

The ADEC issued a second report reinforcing the original findings but conceded the lack of cost data from Teck Cominco made it impossible to evaluate the impact of SCR on the mine's profitability. The EPA issued orders to ADEC under §§113(a)(5) and 167 of the Act that prohibited the ADEC from issuing permits to Teck Cominco without documenting why SCR was not BACT.

The ADEC appealed the EPA's orders to the Ninth Circuit Court of Appeals and argued that the EPA did not have the right to interfere with the state agency's decision. The Ninth Circuit sided with EPA, and ADEC appealed.

Today, the tension between preservation and development is seen in the Arctic National Wildlife Refuge (ANWR) drilling controversy. The question of whether to allow drilling for oil in ANWR has been a political football for every sitting American president since Jimmy Carter. Studies performed by the US Geological Survey have shown that the "1002 area" of ANWR, located just east of Prudhoe Bay, contains large deposits of crude oil. Traditionally, Alaskan residents, trade unions, and business interests have supported drilling in the refuge, while environmental groups and many within the Democratic Party have traditionally opposed it. Among native Alaskan tribes, support is mixed. In the 1990s and first decade of the 21st century, votes about the status of the refuge occurred repeatedly in the U.S. House and Senate, but as of 2007 efforts to allow drilling have always been ultimately thwarted by filibusters, amendments, or vetoes.

== 21st century ==
=== COVID-19 pandemic ===
The COVID-19 pandemic was confirmed to have reached the U.S. state of Alaska on March 12, 2020.

On March 11, Governor Mike Dunleavy's office declared a state of emergency to ensure all entities have the necessary response resources. The next day, the first case, a foreign national in Anchorage, was announced to the public.

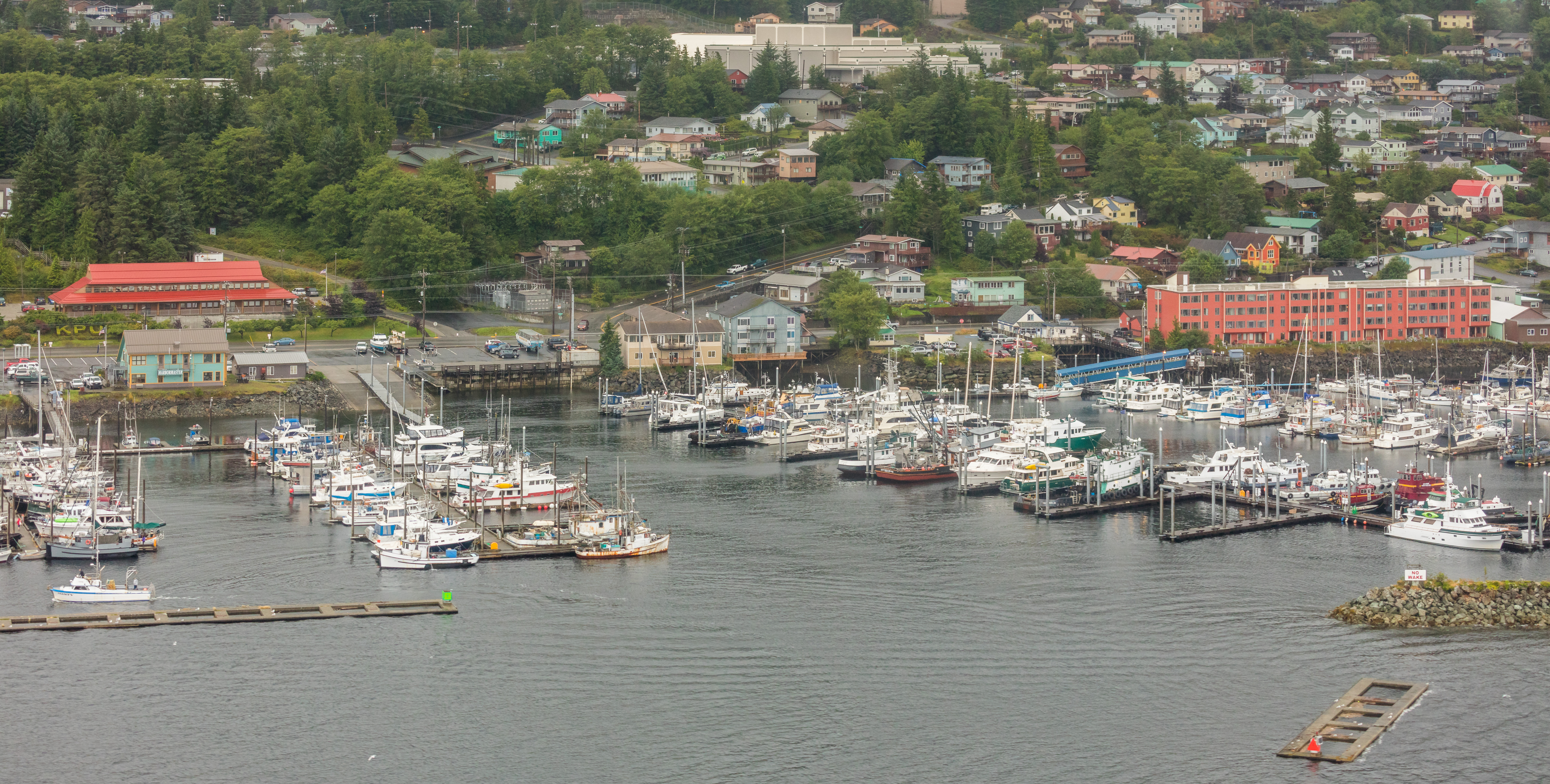
Ketchikan, one of the places affected by COVID-19 during the 2020 outbreak in Alaska

On March 21, 2020, Ketchikan, a small, coastal town of approximately 8,000 residents located in Southeast Alaska was determined to have a cluster of six COVID-19 cases. The town sheltered in place for the following 14 days. On March 24, 2020, three more cases of COVID-19 were found in Ketchikan, bringing the total there to nine. The next day, the total cases there reached 11. On April 1, 2020, the number of positive cases of COVID-19 in Ketchikan rose to 14.

== Notable historical figures ==
- Mottrom Dulany Ball (1835–1877), Collector of Customs, Department of Alaska (1879–1881). U.S. Attorney, District of Alaska (1885–1887). Ball is credited with being the first elected representative to the U.S. House of Representatives in 1881. He was not seated by the House Committee on Elections as the Territory of Alaska had not yet been established.
- Alexander Baranov (1746–1819), Russian trader and governor of Alaska.
- Edward Lewis "Bob" Bartlett (1904–1968), grew up in Fairbanks, was territorial delegate to the U.S. House of Representatives 1945–1959, and United States Senator from 1959 until his death. There are a substantial number of places throughout the state named for him.
- Benny Benson (1913–1972), Alaska Native from Chignik. Designed Alaska's flag at age 13 as a resident of the Jesse Lee Home.
- Vitus Bering (1681–1741), Danish-born Russian explorer, the first European to reach Alaska.
- Charles E. Bunnell (1878–1956), territorial federal judge, first president of the University of Alaska.
- John B. "Jack" Coghill (1925–2019), merchant from Nenana. Held territorial or state elected offices spanning a period of over 40 years, including Lieutenant Governor 1990–1994. One of three surviving delegates to Alaska's constitutional convention 1955–1956.
- Jimmy Doolittle (1896–1993), James Harold "Jimmy" Doolittle grew up in Nome, was a distinguished general in the United States Army Air Forces during World War II, including earning the Medal of Honor.
- Wyatt Earp (1848–1929), lived in Alaska from 1897 to 1901, built the Dexter Saloon in Nome.
- William A. Egan (1914–1984), native of Valdez. Merchant, mayor and legislator. President of Alaska's constitutional convention 1955–1956, "Alaska-Tennessee Plan" (shadow) United States Senator 1956–1958, and following proclamation of statehood, the first and fourth governor of Alaska 1959–1966 and 1970–1974.
- Carl Ben Eielson (1897–1929), pioneering aviator.
- Vic Fischer (1924–2023), another surviving delegate to Alaska's constitutional convention (the third is Seaborn J. Buckalew Jr., born 1920). Retired professor and researcher at the University of Alaska Anchorage, state senator 1981–1987.
- Ernest Henry Gruening (1887–1974), veteran journalist on the east coast of the United States and bureaucrat in the FDR administration, was appointed Governor of the Territory of Alaska in 1939, and served until 1953. He was one of the new state of Alaska's first two United States Senators, serving until 1969. Chiefly known as a Senator for one of two votes again the Gulf of Tonkin Resolution.
- Jay Hammond (1922–2005), resided for the better part of 50 years in rural southwest Alaska. Mayor and legislator. Fifth Governor of Alaska 1974–1982, during the construction of the Trans-Alaska Pipeline System and the rapid changes in state government which followed, including the Permanent Fund and its dividend program. Also known for his conservationist views and a unique way with words.
- B. Frank Heintzleman (1888–1965), official with the U.S. Forest Service in Alaska, appointed territorial governor and served during the height of activity on obtaining statehood for Alaska.
- Saint Herman of Alaska (1756–1837), Russian missionary, first Eastern Orthodox saint in North America.
- Walter Hickel (1919–2010), real estate developer/industrialist. Governor 1966–1969, resigned to become U.S. Secretary of the Interior under President Nixon, elected to another term as governor 1990, served until 1994.
- Sheldon Jackson (1834–1909), an American missionary of the Presbyterian Church and educator, also instrumental in introducing reindeer to Alaska from Siberia. The educational institute he established in Sitka for Native youths became the Sheldon Jackson Museum and College (the latter now closed).
- Joseph Juneau (1836–1899), and Richard Harris (1833–1907), prospectors and founders of what is now Alaska's capital city, Juneau.
- Austin Eugene "Cap" Lathrop (1865–1950), industrialist, founder of some of Alaska's oldest radio stations and builder of currently recognized historic architecture. Produced The Chechahcos, the first movie produced in Alaska. Lathrop's feud with Gruening over statehood issues spawned the novel and film Ice Palace.
- Loren Leman (born 1950), Lieutenant Governor 2002–2006, the first Alaska Native elected to statewide office.
- Ray Mala (1906–1952), the first Native American and first Alaskan to become a film star. He starred in MGM's Eskimo/Mala the Magnificent, which was filmed entirely on location in Alaska. His son, Dr. Ted Mala, became an influential Alaska Native physician, and was also Commissioner of Health and Social Services during Hickel's second governorship.
- Eva McGown (1883–1972), Fairbanks hostess and chorister. Also the basis for a character in Ice Palace.
- John Muir (1838–1914), naturalist, explorer, and conservationist who detailed his journeys throughout Alaska. Was instrumental, along with Gifford Pinchot, in establishing the first wilderness and forest preserves in Alaska during the presidency of Theodore Roosevelt.
- William Oefelein (born 1965), Alaska's first astronaut. His first mission, STS-116. Commander Oefelein, who attended West Anchorage High School, received his commission from Aviation Officer Candidate School in 1988.
- Sarah Palin (born 1964), Alaska's youngest governor, first female governor and Republican vice presidential nominee in 2008.
- Elizabeth Peratrovich (1911–1958), an Alaska Native of Tlingit heritage who fought for passage of non-discrimination laws for Natives and is honored with "Elizabeth Peratrovich Day."
- Tex Rickard (1870–1929), like Wyatt Earp, also a major figure in the Nome Gold Rush c. 1900–1901, and better known for exploits elsewhere.
- George Sharrock (1910–2005), moved to the territory before statehood, eventually elected as the mayor of Anchorage and served during the Good Friday earthquake in March 1964. This was the most devastating earthquake to hit Alaska and it sank beach property, damaged roads and destroyed buildings all over the south central area. Sharrock, sometimes called the "earthquake mayor," led the city's rebuilding effort over six months.
- Soapy Smith (1860–1898), Jefferson Randolph Smith, "Alaska's Outlaw." The infamous confidence man and early settler, who ran the goldrush town of Skagway, Alaska, 1897–98.
- Ted Stevens (1923–2010), United States Senator from Alaska 1968–2009, the longest service of any Republican member. Was originally appointed by Hickel following Bartlett's death, and re-elected seven times before losing re-election in 2008 as he faced a corruption trial. Widely known as a Senator as an often loud and angry advocate for Alaska. Died in a plane crash near Dillingham.
- Fran Ulmer (born 1947), Lieutenant Governor 1994–2002, the first woman elected to statewide office in Alaska, later became chancellor of the University of Alaska Anchorage.
- Saint Innocent of Alaska (1797–1879), First Russian Orthodox bishop in North America.
- Joe Vogler (1913–1993), advocate of secession for Alaska, founder of the Alaskan Independence Party, multiple time unsuccessful candidate for governor.
- Noel Wien (1899–1977), pioneering aviator, founder of Wien Air Alaska, first to make a round trip between Alaska and Asia.
- Ferdinand von Wrangell (1797–1870), explorer, president of the Russian-American Company in 1840–1849.

== See also ==
- Women's suffrage in Alaska
- History of Fairbanks, Alaska
- History of the west coast of North America
- Legal status of Alaska
- List of historical societies in Alaska
- List of Russian explorers
- National Register of Historic Places listings in Alaska
- Western United States

== References and further reading ==
- Andrews, C.L. (1944). The Story of Alaska. The Caxton Printers, Ltd., Caldwell, Idaho.
- Arnold, David F. The Fisherman's Frontier: People and Salmon in Southeast Alaska," by (2008)
- Borneman, Walter R. (2003). Alaska: A Narrative History. Harper-Collins, New York, NY. ISBN 0-06-050306-8.
- Busenberg, George J. Oil and Wilderness in Alaska: Natural Resources, Environmental Protection, and National Policy Dynamics (Georgetown University Press; 2013) 168 pages; studies competing environmental and developmental interests in the state regarding the Trans-Alaska pipeline, the Alaska National Interest Lands Conservation Act, and reforms after the Exxon Valdez disaster.
- Campbell, Robert. In Darkest Alaska: Travel and Empire along the Inside Passage (2008)
- Chandonnet, Fern. Alaska at War, 1941–1945: The Forgotten War Remembered (2007)
- Gruening, Ernest (1967). The Battle for Alaska Statehood. University of Alaska Press, Fairbanks. ISBN 0-912006-12-9.
- Gruening, Ernest (1954). The State of Alaska. Random House, New York. ASIN B0006ATTII.
- Haycox, Stephen (2002). Alaska: An American Colony. University of Washington Press, Seattle, WA. ISBN 0-295-98249-7.
- Henning, Robert, ed. (1981). Bits and Pieces of Alaskan History: Published over the years in From Ketchikan to Barrow, a department in the Alaska Sportsman and Alaska magazine – v.1. 1935-1959 / v.2. 1960-1974. Anchorage: Alaska Northwest Publishing Company. ISBN 978-0882401560.
- McBeath, Jerry et al. The Political Economy of Oil in Alaska: Multinationals vs. the State (2008)
- Naske, Claus-M; Herman E. Slotnick (2003). Alaska: A History of the 49th State. University of Oklahoma Press, Norman, OK. ISBN 0-8061-2099-1.
- Spude, Catherine Holder. Saloons, Prostitutes, and Temperance in Alaska Territory (University of Oklahoma Press, 2015) xviii, 326 pp.
- Wharton, David (1991). They Don't Speak Russian in Sitka: A New Look at the History of Southern Alaska. Markgraf Publications Group, Menlo Park, CA. ISBN 0-944109-08-X.

=== Environment ===
- Catton, Theodore. Inhabited Wilderness: Indians, Eskimos, and National Parks in Alaska (1997)
- Coate, Peter. Trans-Alaska Pipeline Controversy: Technology, Conservation, and the Frontier (1991)
- Fortuine, Robert. Chills and Fever: Health and Disease in the Early History of Alaska (1989)
- Kaye, Roger. Last Great Wilderness: The Campaign to Establish the Arctic National Wildlife Refuge (2007)
- Morse, Kathryn. The Nature of Gold: An Environmental History of the Klondike Gold Rush (2003)
- Ross, Ken. Pioneering Conservation in Alaska (2006)

=== Videos ===
- (2004). Alaska: Big America (TV documentary). The History Channel: AAE-44069.

=== Russian era ===
- Afonsky, Bishop Gregory (1977). A History of the Orthodox Church in Alaska, 1794–1917. St. Herman's Theological Seminary, Kodiak, AK. ASIN B0006CUQ42.
- Black, Lydia T. (2004). Russians in Alaska 1732–1867. University of Alaska Press, Fairbanks. ISBN 1-889963-05-4.
- Fedorova, Svetlana G., trans. & ed. by Richard A. Pierce and Alton S. Donnelly (1973). The Russian Population in Alaska and California: Late 18th Century – 1867. Limestone Press, Kingston, Ontario. ISBN 0-919642-53-5.
- Grinëv, Andrei. V., and Richard L. Bland. "A Brief Survey of the Russian Historiography of Russian America of Recent Years," Pacific Historical Review, May 2010, Vol. 79 Issue 2, pp 265–278
- Nordlander, David J. (1994). For God & Tsar: A Brief History of Russian America 1741 – 1867. Alaska Natural History Association, Anchorage, AK. ISBN 0-930931-15-7.

=== Primary sources ===
- Gruening, Ernest (1966). An Alaska Reader, 1867-1967. New Amsterdam Books, New York. OCLC 480059.
- Williams, Maria Shaa Tláa, eds. The Alaska Native Reader: History, Culture, Politics (Durham: Duke University Press, 2009. xxii, 387 pp.) ISBN 978-0-8223-4480-3

=== Foreign language books ===
- Kobtzeff, Oleg (1985). La Colonisation russe en Amérique du Nord: 18 – 19 ème siècles (Russian Colonization in North-America, 18th–19th Centuries). Department of Slavic History, University of Panthéon-Sorbonne (Paris 1), Paris, France.
- Bolkhovitinov, Nikolai N.; et al. (1997–1999). Istoria Russkoi Ameriki (History of Russian America). Mezhdunarodnye Otnosheniia, Moscow. ISBN 5-7133-0883-9.
- Littke, Peter (2003). Vom Zarenadler zum Sternenbanner. Die Geschichte Russisch-Alaskas. Magnus Verlag, Essen. ISBN 3-88400-019-5.
