= Quartz Gulch =

Coordinates: 58°18′27″N 134°20′42″W

Quartz Gulch was a small gulch on the eastern side of Mount Roberts, about 2.5 miles (4 km) east of Juneau, Alaska. The gulch flowed into Silver Bow Basin. Richard Harris and Joe Juneau, with Chief Kowee, discovered gold in the gulch on October 3, 1880. Harris mined the gulch from 1880 to 1886, taking at least $75,000 in gold.

The gulch I named from the fact that it contained the most gold bearing quartz I had ever seen in one gulch.

— Richard Harris

Creation of the "Glory Hole", a part of the Treadwell gold mine, destroyed the gulch, which had been about 0.3 miles (0.48 km) long. The historical feature was entered into the United States Geological Survey's Geographic Names Information System on January 1, 2000.
