= Last Chance Mining Museum =

- Jualpa Mining Camp
- U.S. National Register of Historic Places
- U.S. Historic district
- Alaska Heritage Resources Survey
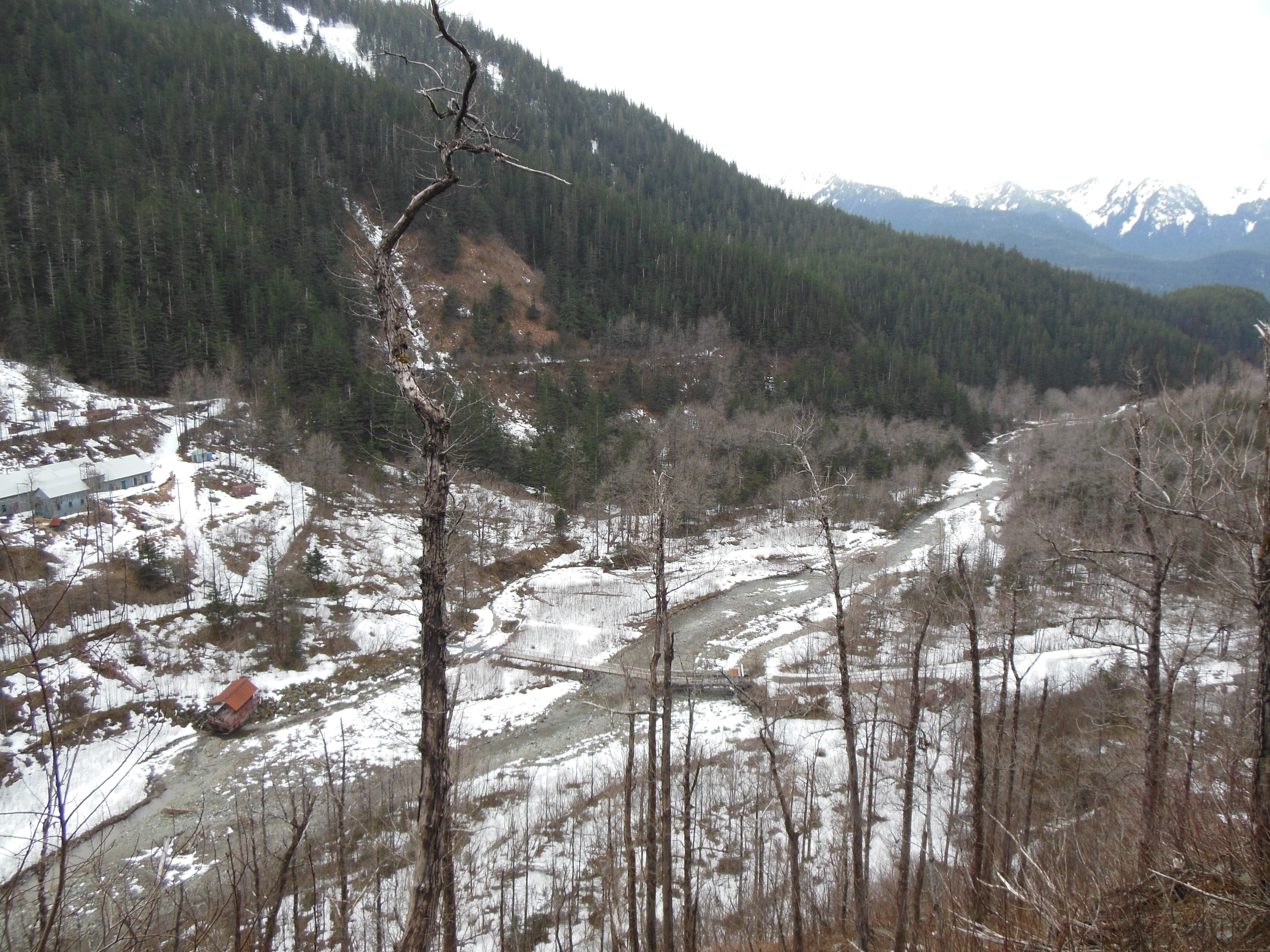
- View of Gold Creek, with some of the camp buildings in the background

- Location within Alaska
- Location: 1001 Basin Road, Juneau, Alaska
- Coordinates: 58°18′24″N 134°23′7″W
- Area: 17 acres (6.9 ha)
- Built: 1913
- Built by: Alaska Juneau Gold Mining Company; F.W. Bradley; A.W. Quist and Company
- NRHP reference No.: 93000733
- AHRS No.: JUN-525
- Added to NRHP: August 5, 1993

The Jualpa Mining Camp, also known as the Last Chance Basin Camp, is a former gold mining camp, just outside the city of Juneau, Alaska. Its main building is now operated as the Last Chance Mining Museum by the Gastineau Channel Historical Society. The camp was located on the southern banks of Gold Creek, about 1 mile (1.6 km) north of Juneau, near what is now the end of Basin Road. The camp was the site of one of the largest gold finds in the Juneau mining district. It was established between 1910 and 1913 by the Alaska-Juneau Gold Mining Company and operated until 1944, producing more than $80 million worth of gold. The largest surviving structure of the camp is its air compressor building, which was 84 feet (26 m) long, and still houses the compressor used by the company. Also surviving are a variety of railroad-related resources, which the company used to bring or to its mill on the Gastineau Channel, an electrical transformer house, powder magazine, and cable hoist.

The camp, with a total of 21 contributing buildings and structures, was listed on the National Register of Historic Places in 1993.

== See also ==
- National Register of Historic Places listings in Juneau, Alaska
