= Juneau gold belt =

Juneau gold belt buried deep underground mystery

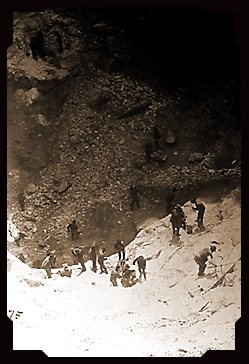
Treadwall Mining

The Juneau gold belt is located in the southeastern portion of the U.S. state of Alaska. This belt is approximately 100 miles (160 km) in length, north/northwest-trending, and extends from Berners Bay southeastward to Windham Bay, 60 miles (97 km) southeast of Juneau, and includes Douglas Island. The belt contains over 200 gold-quartz-vein deposits with production nearing 7,000,000 ounces (200,000,000 g) of gold. More than three-quarters of Alaska's lode gold was mined from the Juneau gold belt.

== History ==
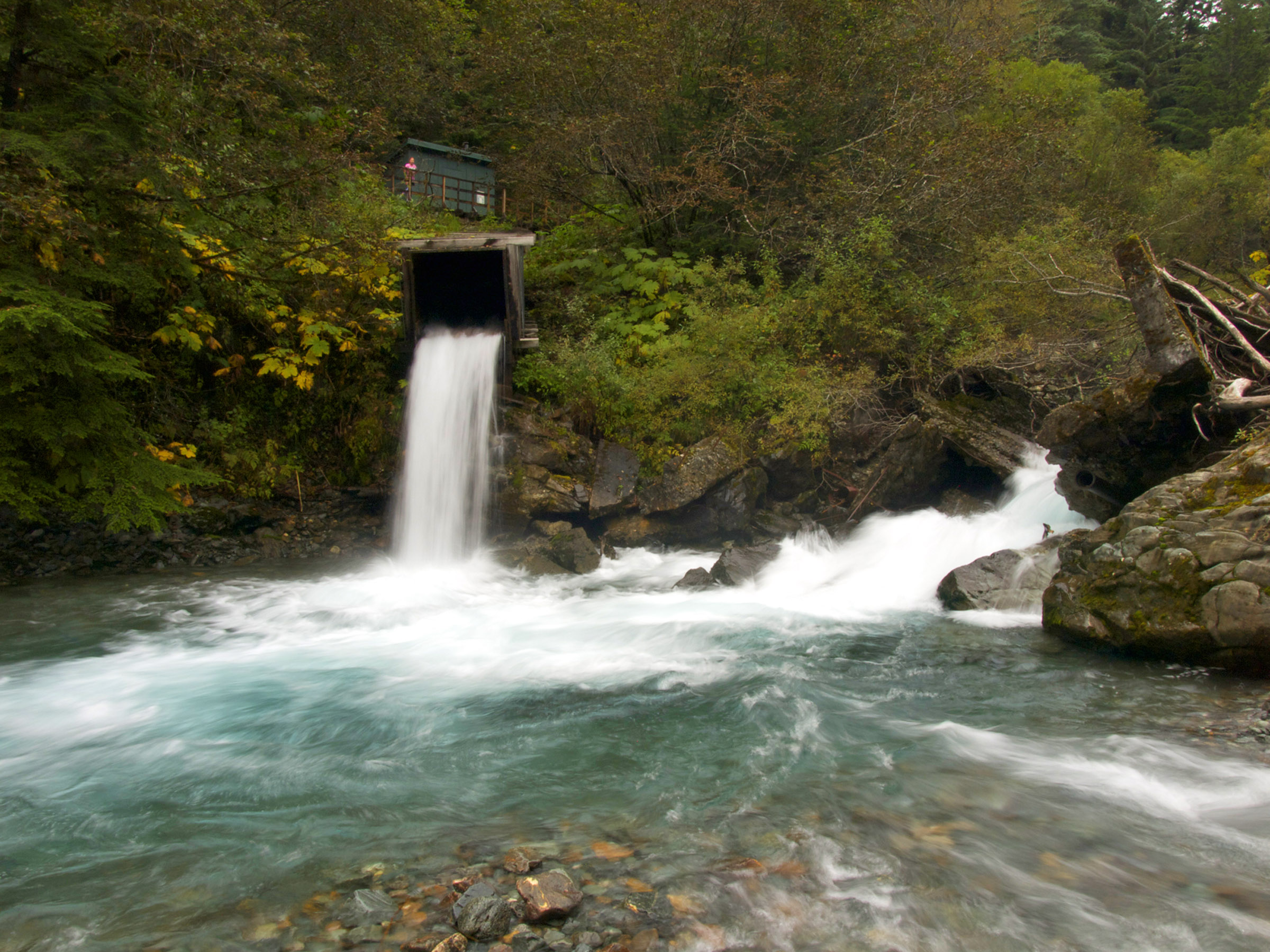
Gold Creek

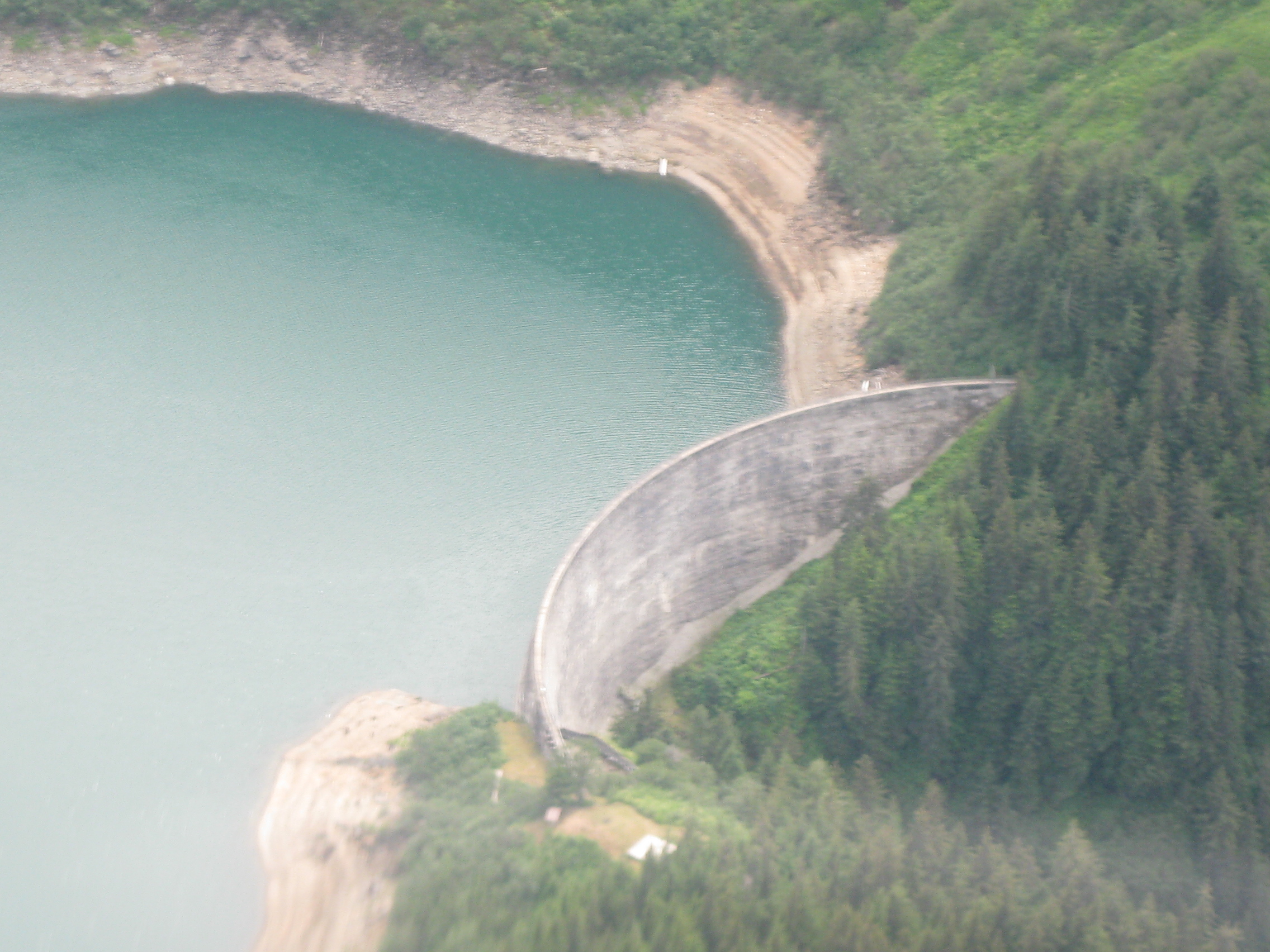
Salmon Creek

Gold mining in the belt became active after an 1869 study of the Juneau mining district, of which the Juneau gold belt is but one part. Chief Kowee was one of the earliest gold prospectors in the belt area. In 1880, he revealed to prospectors Joe Juneau and Richard Harris the presence of gold in Silver Bow Basin's Gold Creek, after which Juneau was founded in the same year. The Juneau gold rush of 1880 resulted in some of the largest gold mines in the world, including the Treadwell complex of lode mines on Douglas Island and the Alaska-Juneau lode mine, in Juneau itself. The steep, wet, timber-covered, seaside mountain setting provided water power, transportation, and lumber such that, "extraordinarily low costs of operation make available low grade ore that under conditions only slightly different would be valueless."

In 1895, southeastern Alaska was the first part of the Territory of Alaska to have its mineral resources researched by the U.S. Geological Survey. It surveyed the gold deposit areas of Juneau and Sitka. Systematic surveying began in 1902 which included a topographic map of the gold-bearing area adjacent to Juneau. In the following year, a detailed map of the Juneau region's geology was mapped in detail. A reconnaissance of almost the entire Juneau gold belt was carried out from Port Houghton to the boundary with Canada; in 1904, another reconnaissance, this time of nearby Admiralty Island, was conducted, concentrating on ore deposits and economic geology. The 1986 study by the Bureau of Mines concentrated on the mineral resources of the northern region of southeast Alaska, specifically covering the Juneau gold belt. Aside from information on geological formations of the area, data related to mining was also examined.

== Geography ==
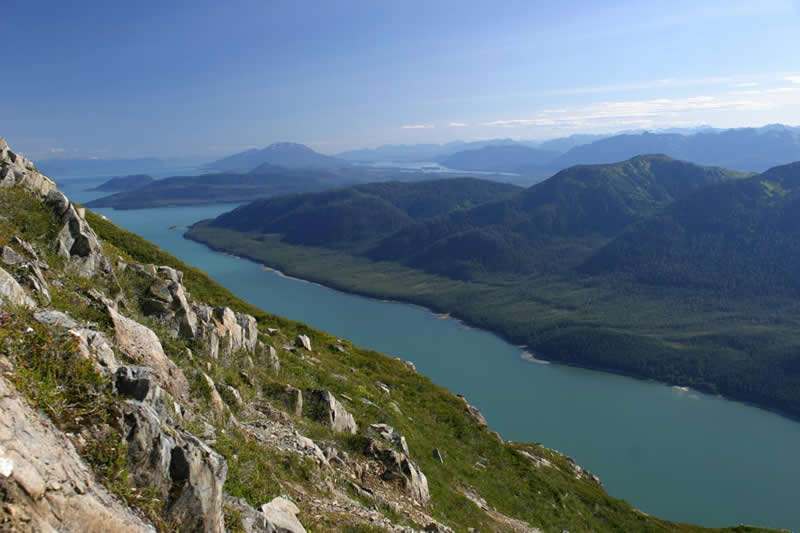
Gastineau Channel

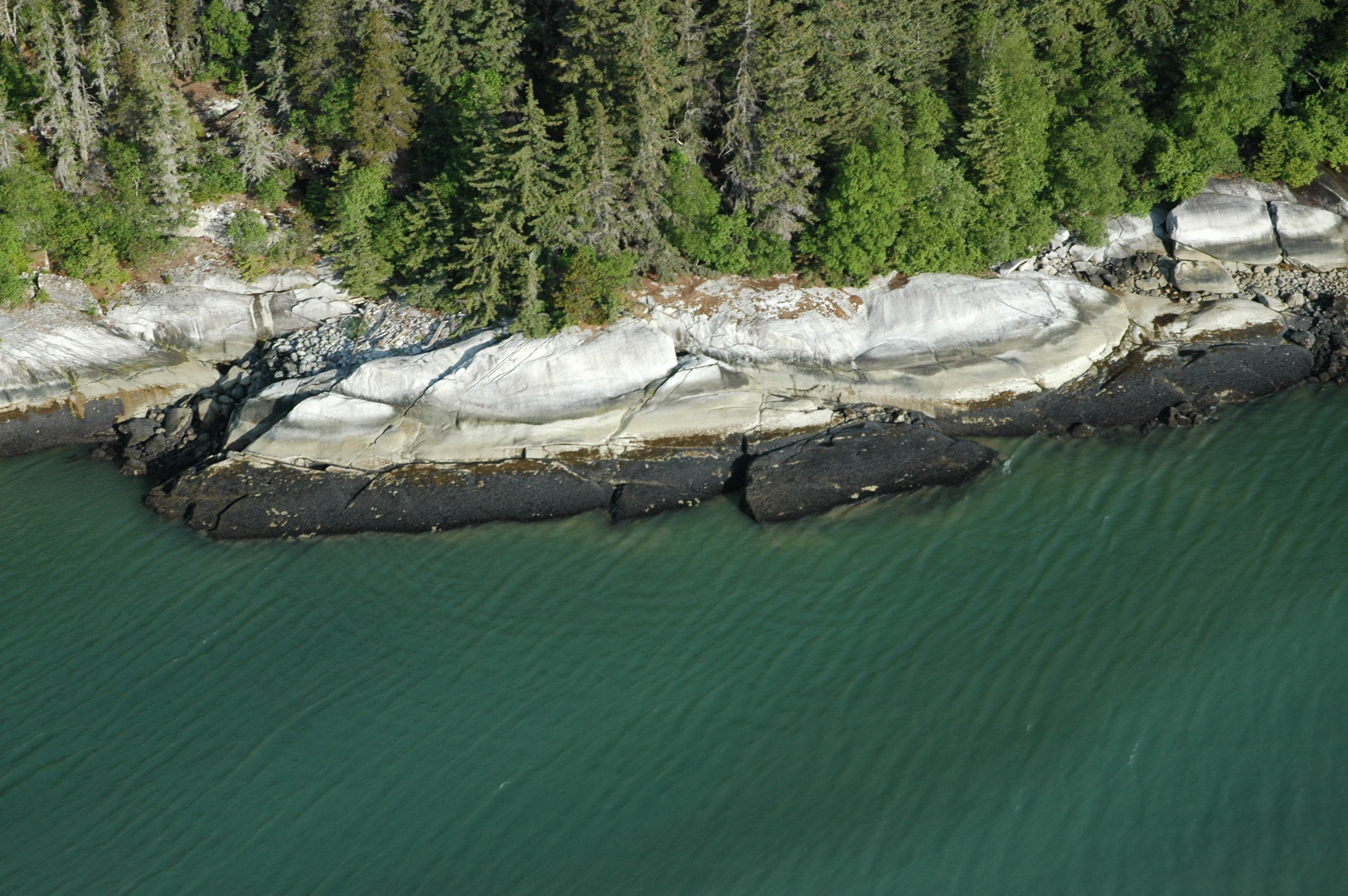
Lynn Canal

The Juneau gold belt comprises a section of the Juneau Mining District, the other sections being Glacier Bay/Mt. Fairweather, the volcanic area of West Lynn Canal/Haines/Porcupine, and the Molybdenite area. The northern part of the belt, the Eagle River region, extends northwestward from Salmon Creek to Berners Bay. It is 32 miles (51 km) in length. Throughout the inland portion of the belt, outcrops below the timber line are buried under glacial drift, moss, and vegetation. The belt is characterized as a narrow strip of land lying between salt water and the Coast Range's high diorite peaks. It trends northwest and southeast, following the coast. Gastineau Channel and Lynn Canal form the southwest border while Berners Bay forms a northwest one. Between Lynn Canal and the mountains, whose altitude ranges between 4,000–6,000 feet (1,200–1,800 m), there are parallel ridges. The region contains numerous glaciers and several waterways, such as the Montana and Windfall creeks, Windfall Lake at McGinnis Creek, Lemon Creek, Montana Basin, and Auke Lake. The Montana, Windfall, and Cowee creek valleys create a single system along the belt. Larger rivers, like the Eagle, Herbert, and Mendenhall, form gravel valleys following the belt's path.

== Geology ==
The gold belt stretches over a length of 160 kilometres (99 mi) trending north-northwest of the Cretaceous Terrance complex. The complex is hosted in an accretionary terrane of Permian to Cretaceous sedimentary and volcanic rocks which have undergone greenschist grade metamorphism. Resulting lithologies include: phyllite (some are graphitic), basalt and andesite (greenstones), along with minor marble and quartzite. Gold bearing veins and fissure fillings of the area are comparable with the California "mother lode" deposits.

Most of the gold mines in the Juneau belt occur in the band of black slate which lies between the schists to the northeast and the greenstones to the southwest. "The complex of veins which follow this black slate is described as the main lode system of the Juneau belt." "Parallelism of vein systems and ore deposits with the outcrops of bed-rock formations...is one of the noteworthy characteristics of the district." This results in a "linear distribution of the mines." Most of the gold deposits are found distributed within associated sulfide minerals and is extracted via free milling. Pyrite is the most common sulfide found in these deposits followed by pyrrhotite

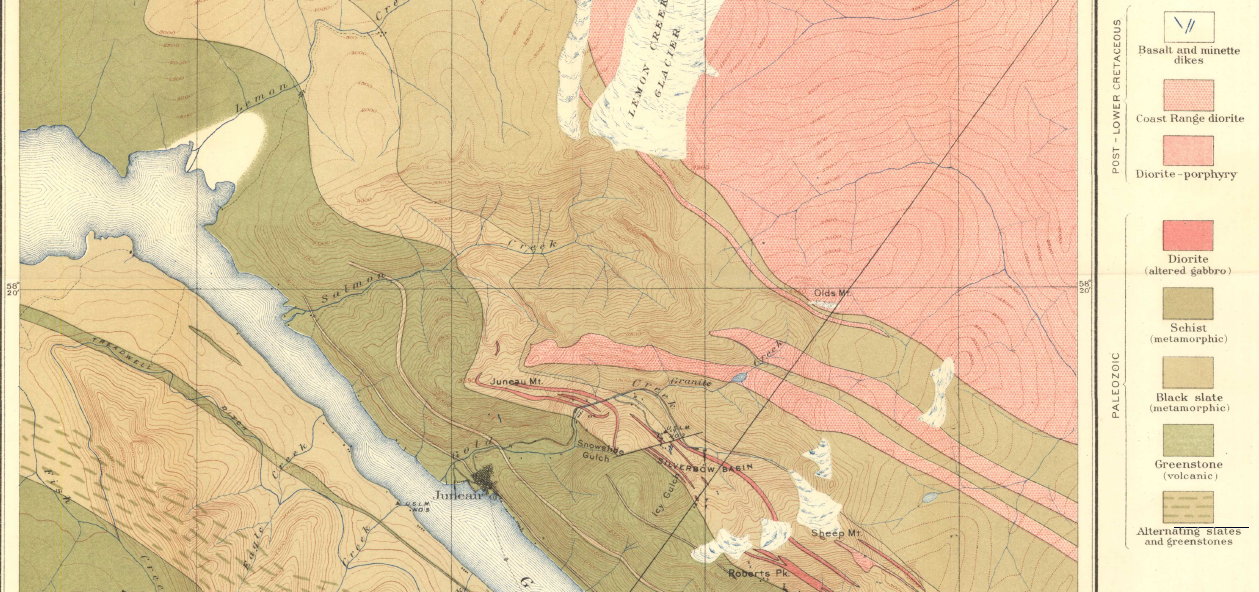
Geological map of the Juneau area

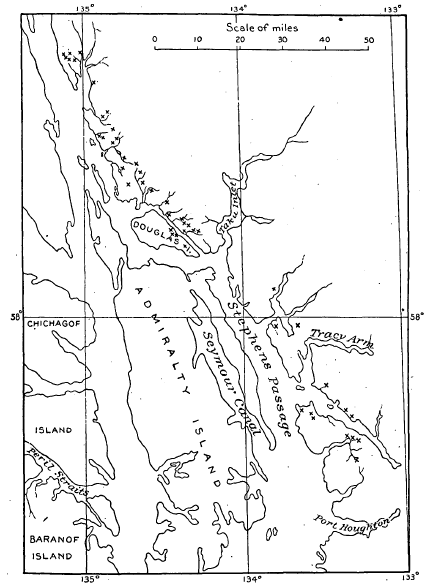
Map of principal mines, marked by an "x", in the Juneau Gold Belt

== Flora ==
Flora includes spruce, hemlock, pine, grassy parks, cedar, blueberry brush, devil's club, alder, and hemlock.

== See also ==
- Holkham Bay
- Port Snettisham
- Sheep Creek (Juneau, Alaska)
- Lemon Creek (Alaska)
- Kowee Creek
