= Treadwell gold mine =

Gold mine in the United States

Coordinates: 58°16′32″N 134°23′33″W

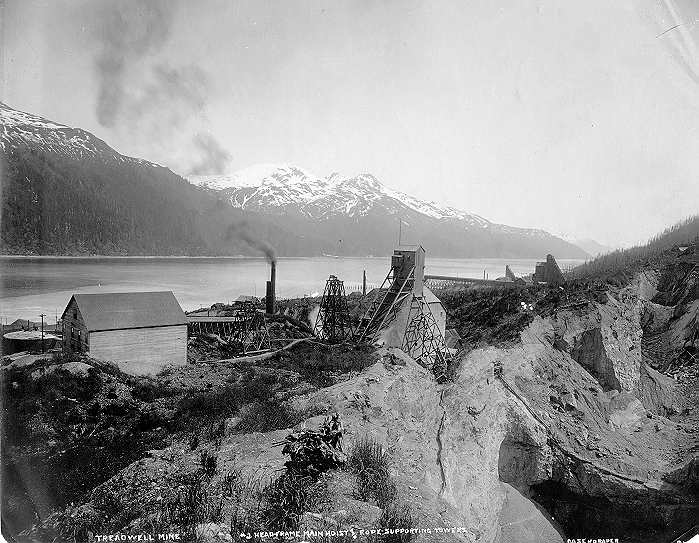
Treadwell mine, circa 1890s

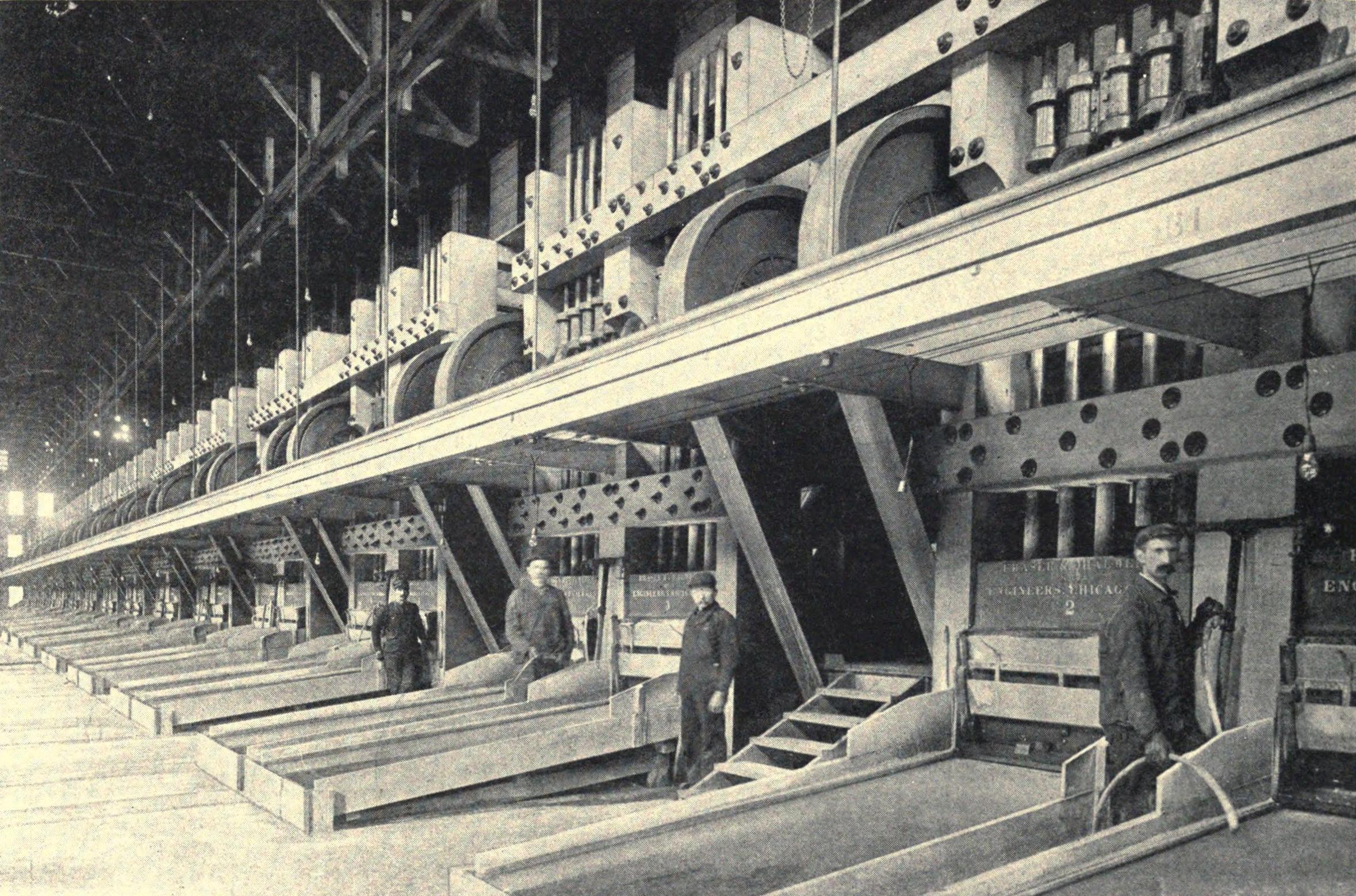
Treadwell stamp mills, 1908

The Treadwell gold mine was on the south side of Douglas Island, .5-mile (0.80 km) east of downtown Douglas and southeast of downtown Juneau, owned and operated by John Treadwell. Composed of four sub-sites, Treadwell was in its time the largest hard rock gold mine in the world, employing over 2,000 people. Between 1881 and 1922, over 3 million troy ounces of gold were extracted. Not much remains today except for a few crumbling buildings and a "glory hole". Although John Treadwell had twelve years of experience in both placer and lode mines, he was a carpenter and builder by trade who had come to Alaska prior to the Klondike Gold Rush.

== Beginnings ==
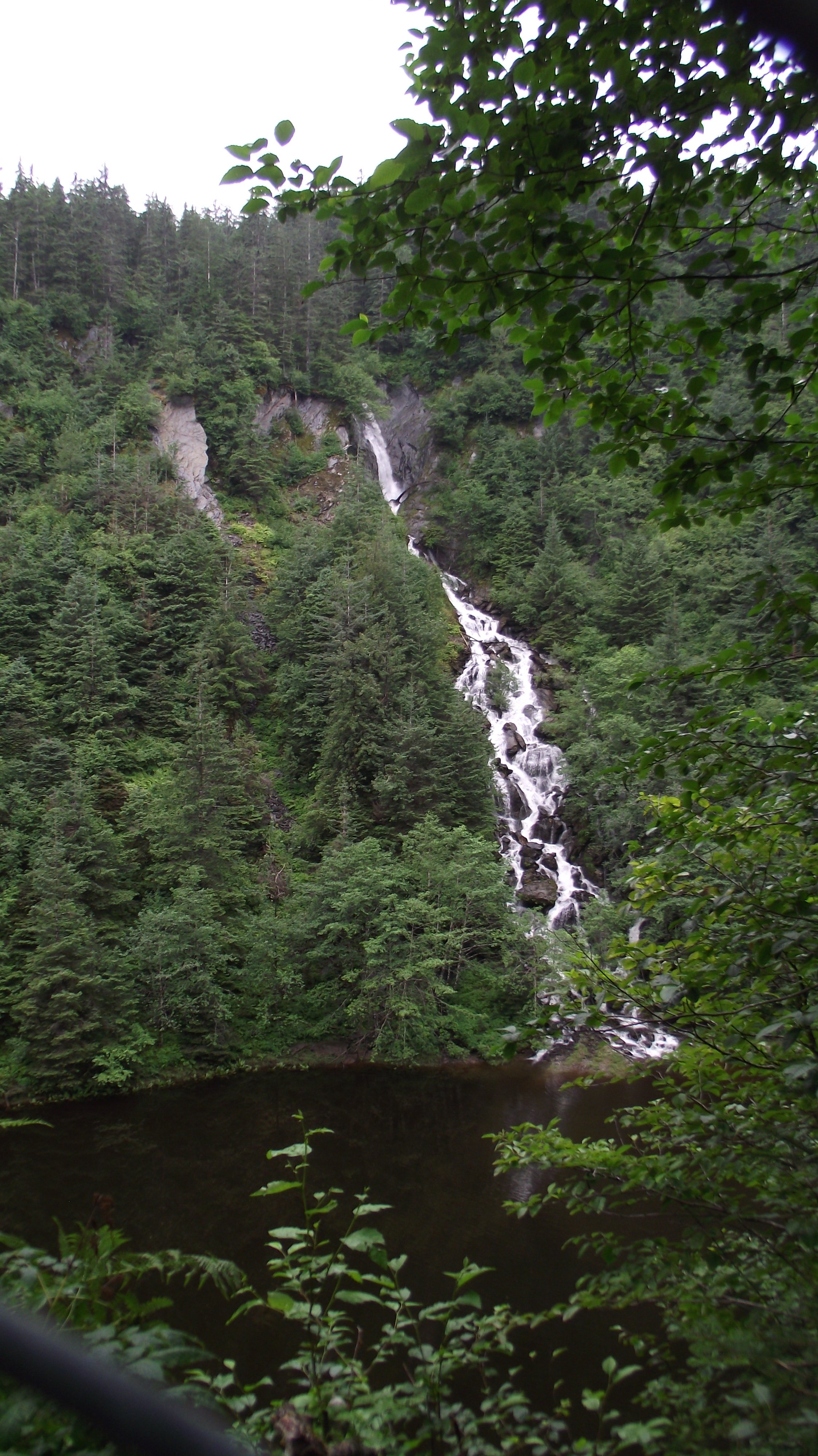
The Glory Hole, 2012

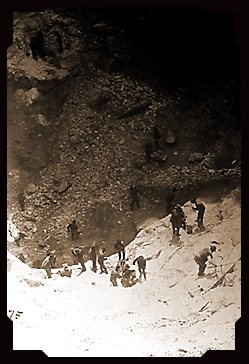
Miners working in the Glory Hole, circa 1900s

In 1880, prospectors Joseph 'Joe' Juneau and Richard Harris discovered gold in Silver Bow Basin. This brought waves of prospectors to the region, including John Treadwell, whose first move was to purchase a lode claim on Douglas Island from Pierre Joseph Erussard ("French Pete") on September 13, 1881.

Treadwell formed a partnership in Sept. 1881 with Erussard de Ville, D.P. Mitchell and Dave Martin under the name of The San Francisco Company. For unknown reasons he later backed out of this, and in early December 1881 he devoted his attention solely to the Douglas Island property. He then went on to buy two claims neighboring his property from D. W. Clark. Treadwell extracted twenty two samples from his three claims which he sent to San Francisco, California for a mill test, yielding encouraging results.

On December 27, 1881, Treadwell organized the Alaska Mill & Mining Company and began operations at the Treadwell Dike. Shortly after this, five men from California bought over $10,000 worth of stock in the business. These men were James Freeborn (1828 - June 21, 1894), San Francisco banker and mining magnate John Douglas Fry (July 1, 1819 - February 3, 1901), Horace Lewis Hill (1840 - November 6, 1912), Howard Hill Shinn (born April 4, 1857) and E. M. With these men funding him, Treadwell began running a tunnel and discovered that much of the vein he was mining was not on his property. Because word of his strike had not yet gotten out he was able to buy many of the adjoining claims for very little money, after which he returned to San Francisco to secure more backing for a much larger mill. His financial benefactors agreed to invest more and the major mining operation had begun.

By 1882, a 5-stamp mill was operating. In 1887, a 120-stamp mill was erected, which was doubled in size the next year. Between 1883 and 1896, three more mills were added to the Treadwell Complex. These served the Mexican, Seven Hundred Foot, and Ready Bullion mines. A second mill, with 300 stamps, was added to the Treadwell Mine in 1899.In 1889, Treadwell sold his stake in the company for $1.5 million (~$47.3 million in 2024) and returned to California.

== Geology ==
The geology on Douglas Island consists of a belt of volcanic greenstones next to Stephens Passage, which alternate with slate before the transitioning into a belt of slate next to the Gastineau Channel. The slate band includes many dikes of diorite. "Secondarily fractured and mineralized diorite dikes constitute the ore bodies in the Treadwell group of mines on Douglas Island." Gold-bearing sulfide minerals impregnate the dikes, principally pyrite.

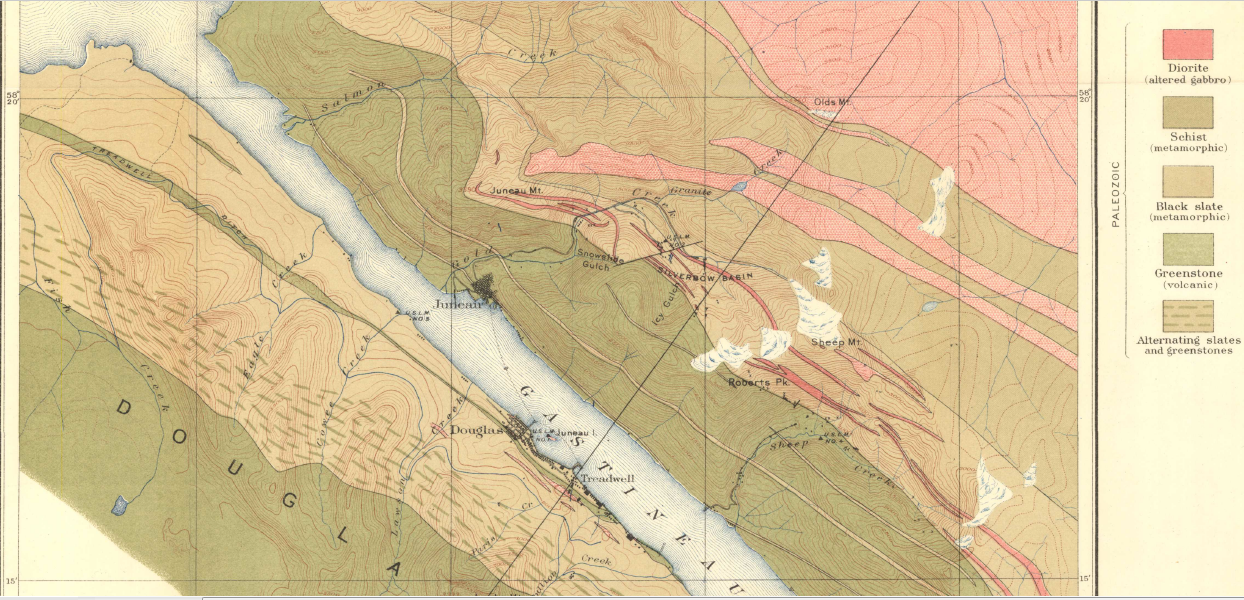
Geological map of the Douglas area.

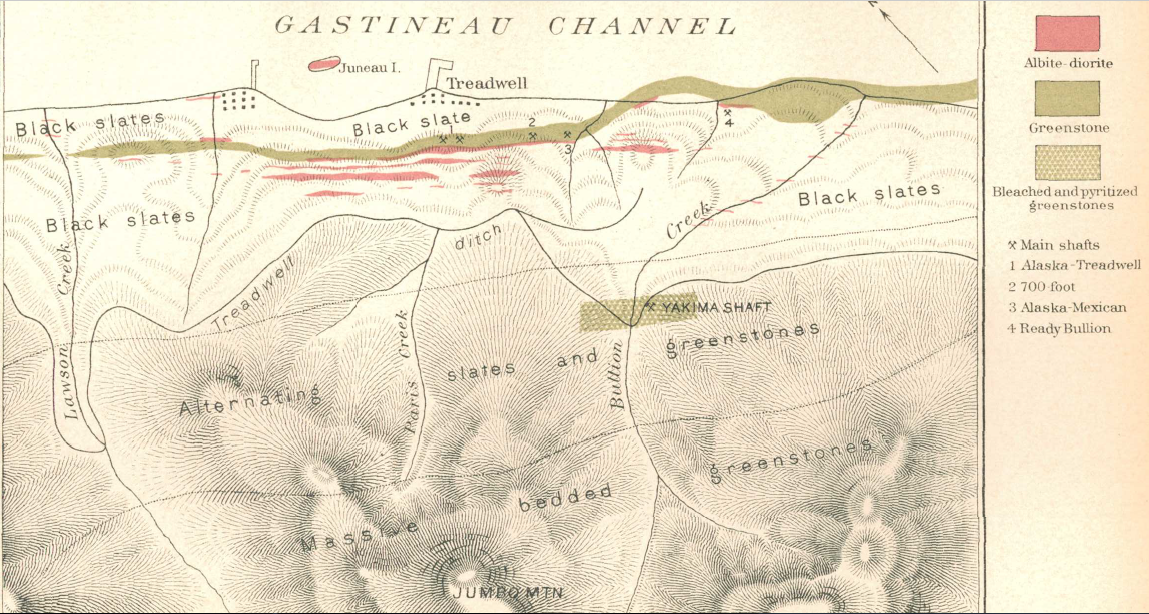
Detailed geological map indication location of the individual mines.

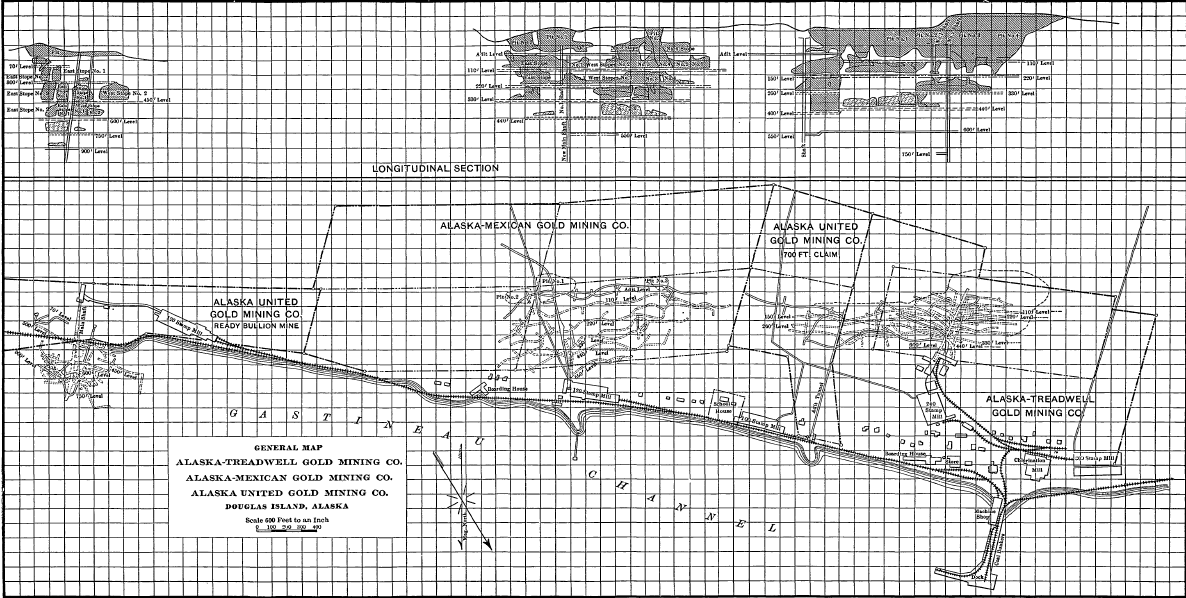
Detailed map of the mine shafts and levels.

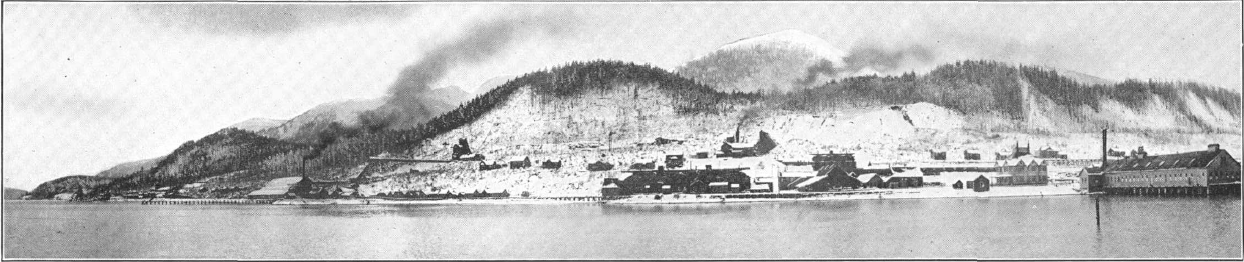
View of the Treadwell Mines on Douglas Island.

== Operation ==
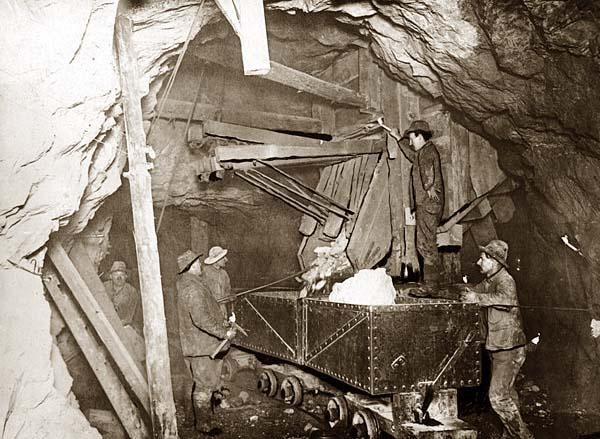
Miners in an under-sea shaft, 1916

At the height of the operation there were five mills with over 960 stamps in continuous operation, closing down only on Christmas and Independence Day. These mills were fed by four mines known as the Treadwell, 700-Foot, Mexican and Ready Bullion. At this time the mine employed over 2,000 people and was the largest hard rock mine in the world. The gold was 55% free milling and 45% embedded in pyrite, which was extracted using chlorination, smelting, and cyanidation. Power to the complex was supplied by a coal-fired power plant (later switching to oil and two hydroelectric dams).

Some of the shafts extended as much as 2,400 feet (730 m) below the surface.

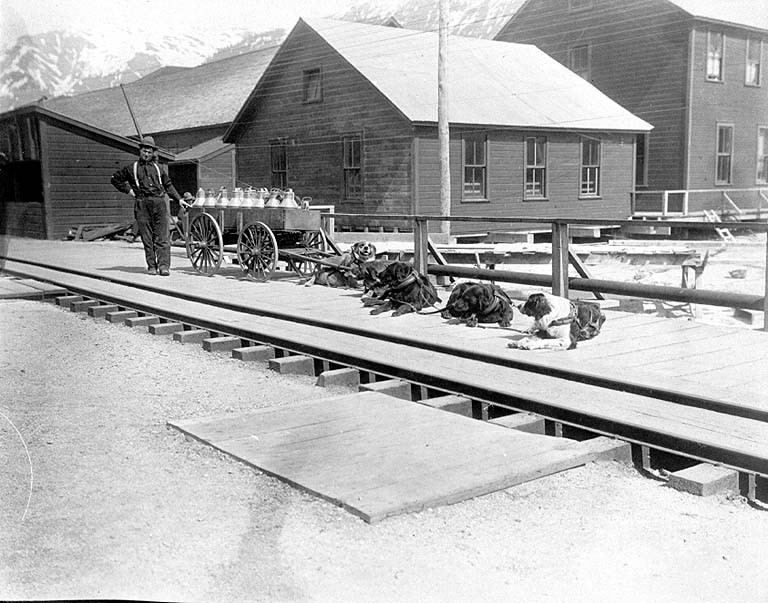
Joe Kendler delivering milk with his dogteam in Treadwell, May 1911

In 1914, many Serbian and Greek miners at Treadwell, who made up the bulk of the miners, left to fight for their home countries in World War I.

The Treadwell had its own baseball field and team that competed with four other teams from Alaska and Yukon. There was also a natatorium, which housed a swimming pool, as well as basketball courts.

== Decline ==
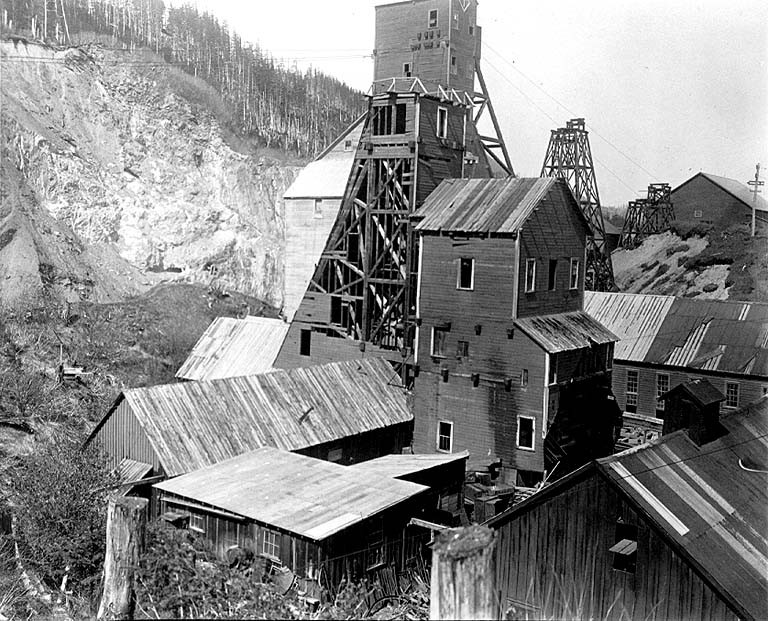
Hoist at the Glory Hole at the Treadwell mine, May 1911

On March 3, 1910, there was a massive explosion on the 1,100-foot level of Mexican mine. The blast was so powerful a miner on the 900-foot level died in the accident. The explosion was due to eight cases of dynamite stored in a magazine. The area was designed that in the case of an explosion, the fumes would go up through the shaft and not suffocate the miners. Unfortunately, the men killed and wounded were directly in the way of the blast. Thirty nine men and one horse were killed in total. Many of them came from countries far across the ocean. Serbia alone accounted for 17 deaths. The 1910 explosion was the worst disaster in Alaska mining history.

The mine was still yielding gold in 1917 when the Treadwell, 700-Foot and Mexican mines (excavated to a depth of more than 500 feet (150 m) below sea level under Gastineau Channel) suddenly began leaking and were evacuated. Hours later the mines collapsed. At the climax, sprays of water were sent up to 200 feet (61 m) in the air from the mine entrances. The only casualties were a dozen horses and one mule; local lore has it that one man unaccounted for used the opportunity to head for parts unknown.

Evidence of instability had been noticed around 1909, but there was no indication of impending disaster until 1913, when major geological shifts occurred. Reinforcements were constructed but were ineffective. The last shaft was worked in a limited fashion until 1922.

== Demographics ==
Historical population
Census	Pop.	Note	%±
1900	522		—
1910	1,222		134.1%
1920	325		−73.4%
1930	16		−95.1%
1940	13		−18.7%
U.S. Decennial Census

Treadwell first appeared on the 1890 U.S. Census, but was returned with Douglas, so did not report a separate figure. It first appeared separately on the 1900 U.S. Census as an unincorporated village, and was the 10th largest community in Alaska. In 1901, Treadwell formally incorporated. In 1910, it reached its apex of 1,222 residents (including 1,175 Whites, 44 Other and 3 Native Americans), and was the 6th largest city in Alaska. However, in 1912, it disincorporated and the population rapidly fell with the gradual closure of the mines. It fell to 325 residents and 26th place by 1920. It continued to report as a village until 1940, but became effectively a ghost town by the 1920s. By 1970, it and all other places in Juneau Borough were merged into the city of Juneau.

== Today ==
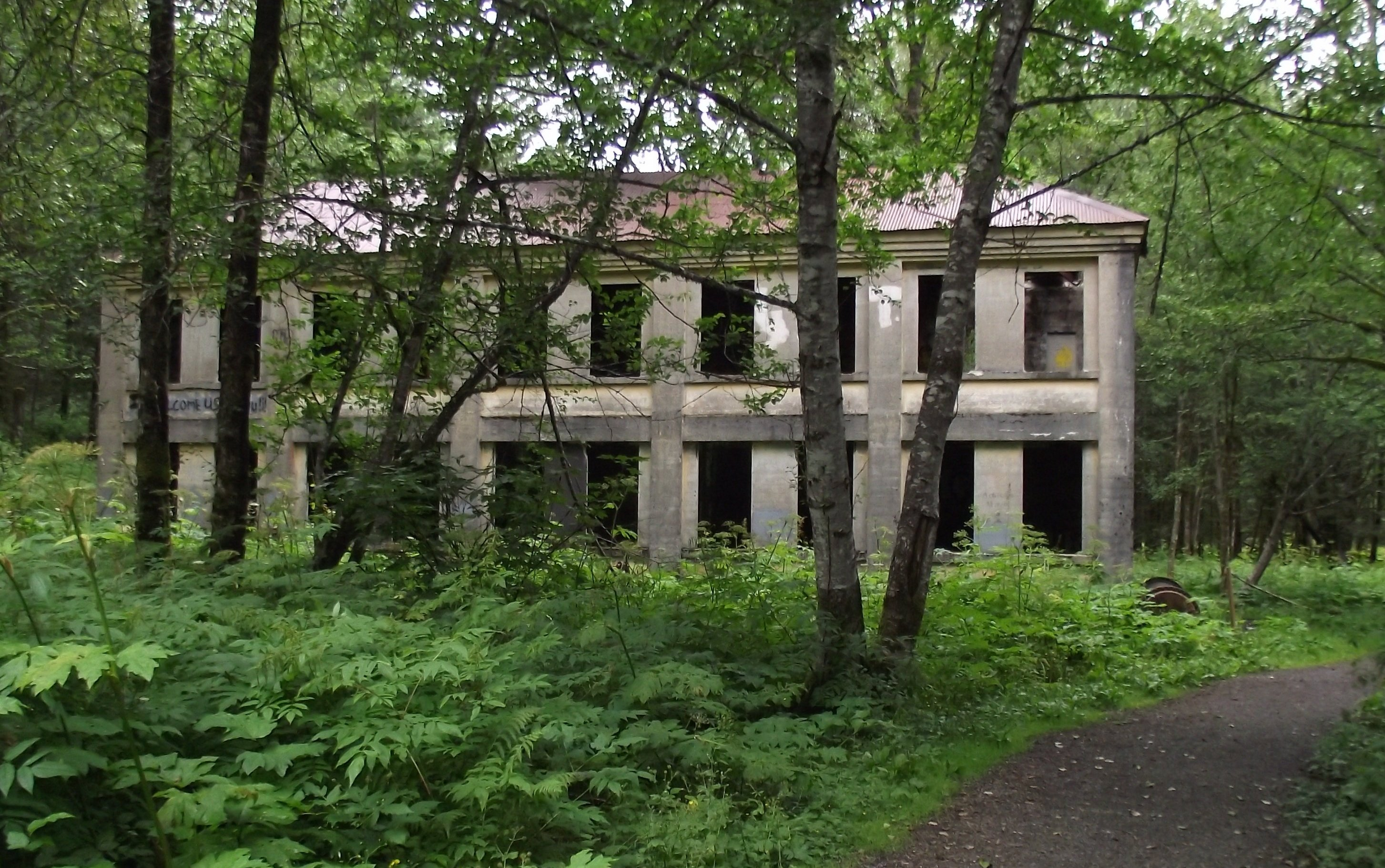
"New" Office Building, 2012

From the dissolution of the Boston Alaska Mining Company, the property became 99.9% interest to the historical Nowell family and specifically George. The Nowell descendants and Alaska Electric Light & Power, have since deeded a portion to the city of Juneau with the stipulation that it be maintained as a historic site. Under the management of the Treadwell Historic Preservation & Restoration Society there are recreation trails with markers identifying various locations. Another portion of the property is leased to a zip line operator.

Directly above the cave-in site is a concrete pad where the Alaska Department of Transportation and Public Facilities placed a 105mm howitzer, which was fired across Gastineau Channel at a shoulder of Mount Roberts to break up avalanches before they get so big as to pose a danger to Thane Road and residences there; however, in 2019 the howitzer was removed and avalanche control is now handled by helicopters with attached DaisyBell devices.

== See also ==
- Juneau gold belt
- Alaska-Juneau Gold Mining Company
- Juneau mining district
- Gold mining in Alaska

Coal mine disasters:

- Smith Mine disaster
- Argonaut Mine
- Monongah mining disaster

== Sources ==
=== Online ===
- Treadwell family history
- Bureau of Land Management
- Treadwell mine City of Juneau official history site

=== Printed ===
- Hard Rock Gold by David & Brenda Stone, Vanguard Press, 1987
- History of the Mines & Miners in the Juneau Gold Belt by Earl Redman, 1988
- The Birdman of Treadwell: Diary of a Treadwell Gold Miner by Edwin Warren with Barry Kibler (ISBN 9781425960643)
- I Remember Treadwell by Charlotte L. Mahafly, Accra Print, 1983
