= Juneau mining district =

Gold mining area in Alaska, USA

- Alaska Mining District
- Location within Alaska
- Coordinates: 58°20′N 134°40′W

The Juneau mining district is a gold mining area in the U.S. state of Alaska.

As of 2025, the Kensington mine is currently operating since it began operating again in 2010.

In 1880 a local inhabitant, Chief Kowee, revealed to prospectors Joe Juneau and Richard Harris the presence of gold in what is now named Gold Creek in Silver Bow Basin. The city of Juneau was founded there that year. The strike sparked the Juneau gold rush which resulted in the development of many placer and lode mines. The largest early mines were the Treadwell complex and the AJ lode mine. The steep, wet, timber-covered, seaside mountain setting provided water power, transportation, and lumber such that, "extraordinarily low costs of operation make available low grade ore that under conditions only slightly different would be valueless."

The first claims of what was to become the Treadwell complex were staked in 1881. Mining the Treadwell site began by sluicing residual placers over the lode deposits. Underground mining began with a five-stamp mill operating in 1883. In the mid-1910s, with 960 stamps grinding ore and tunnels reaching as far as 2,400 feet (730 m) below the surface and extending under the sea, Treadwell was one of the most technologically advanced mines of its day. Up to 2000 people worked at the mine before a collapse allowed the rising tide to flood the tunnels in 1917. All operations at the Treadwell ceased by 1922.

As the Treadwell mines declined and closed, the AJ (Alaska Juneau) mine rose in prominence. After years of losses and labor problems, the mine became profitable in the mid-1920s: with 600 workers it was setting production records. Through the decade, it was the main economic engine of Juneau. In the 1930s, with 1000 workers, it was an important factor in softening the impact upon Juneau of the Great Depression. Economic pressures of WWII lead to the closure of the AJ in 1944; this was the end of the dominance of mining in the Juneau economy.

Although those two mines are long-since closed, as late as 2010 one of the hydropower plants built to power the AJ was still in use. Fires and time have destroyed most traces of the Treadwell complex; the AJ mine buildings were burned by vandals and little can be seen by visitors these days because of the growth of alders. The Juneau mining district, comprising the area between the Canada–US border, Lynn Canal, Admiralty Island, and Frederick Sound, has produced over 7 million ounces of lode gold and 80,000 ounces of placer gold.

== History ==
Period of 1869–1921

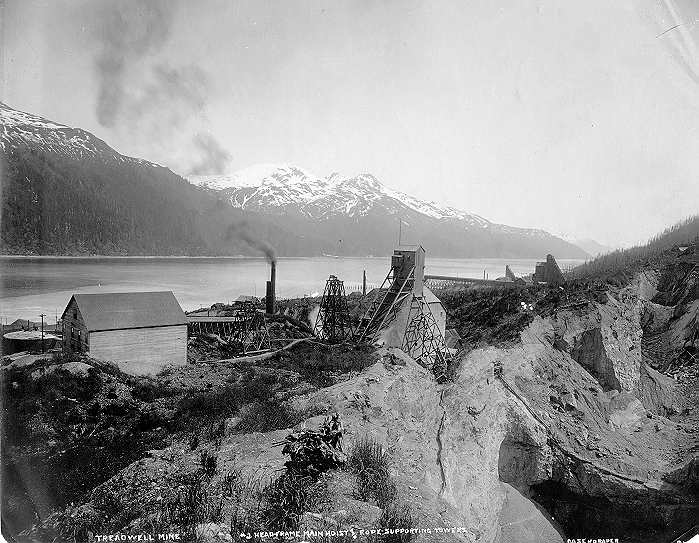
Treadwell Mine

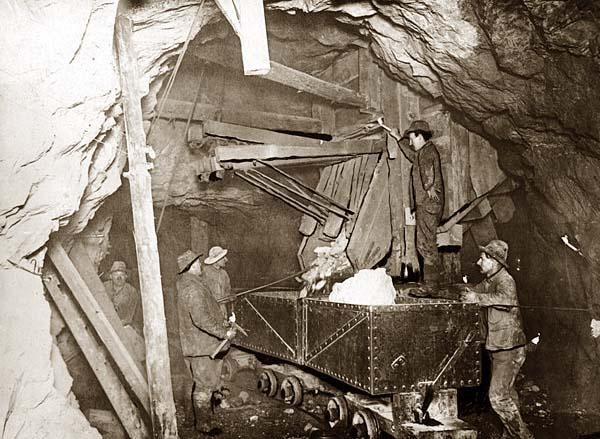
Treadwell Miners

The year 1869 was historic in Alaskan history as it marked the first discovery of gold tracers at Powers Creek and Windham Bay, which resulted in the first gold production in Alaska. The initiative to establish mines were from Treadwell and Alaska Juneau establishments and both became large mining complexes. The emphasis in the initial stages was to extract gold from on gold tracer deposits. However, in the early 1880s, importance shifted to Lode deposits. In 1881, in order to increase production the Treadwell (They were a complex of three firms with four mines) established their first stamp mills in Silver Bow Basin and production started rising, particularly of lode extraction. John Treadwell (1842–1927) a Canadian gold miner owned and operated the Treadwell gold mine through the Treadwell Mining Company. He was responsible for initiating low-grade gold mining in Alaska adopting most advanced operations on a big scale, which boosted the economy of the wilderness areas. His four mines formed the largest complex in the world at that time. Treadwell's mine complex "put Juneau on the map".

The Alaska Mill and Mining Company was established in May 1882. Explorations on an experimental basis included a five-stamp mill. The results proved profitable and the company expanded with a bigger sized 120-stamp mill in 1883 and another in 1887. In the initial years, the Treadwell Complex had four mines (Treadwell, Ready Bullion, the Mexican and the Seven-Hundred-Foot)) and five mills. The gold yield was worth about US$70 million.

During 1890 to 1915, many smaller mines came to be established in addition to the major players in the field. the smaller mines were: the Sumdum Chief, the Crystal, Comet, Jualin, Silver Queen, and Eagle River mines. Production figures of Treadwell complex (including the Treadwell, 700 Foot, Mexican, and Ready Bullion Mines) peaked to a record production record of 5,000 short tons (st) of ore every day. However, by 1917 the smaller mines folded up and Treadwell had sudden closure of operation due to a major mining accident in which their mines got flooded; a cave in occurred and the sea water flooded the mines. After this incident they traded in Ready Bullion. However, the old Perseverance Mine got reestablished as the Alaska Gastineau Co, adopted innovative techniques for mining by adopting ball mills pattern that had been successfully adopted in the porphyry copper ore extracted in the American southwest. Their production peaked for a time and then went down due to problems to the mines and mining. They closed their mines in 1921. Treadwell had ended producing about 3.1 million oz gold from ore that averaged 0.13 oz/st gold by the time they ended their operations.

Period 1915–1921

The Alaska Juneau Mine, however, were successful, after overcoming initial teething troubles, to increase their production using the same innovative technique which the Alaska Gastineau Co had used. The use of ball mill for ore grinding became a success and they could extract 12,000 short tons of ore per day. Their profit was reported as an average of 0.04 oz/st gold.

Period 1921–1944

Between 1930 and early 1940s, the Alaska Juneau Mine became the largest and lowest-grade gold mine in the world and also were the largest in lead producers. However World War II, the inflation that followed and a fixed price for gold could not sustain their operations and they closed their mines in 1944. Their operations resulted in total production of 2.9 million troy ounce (oz) gold, 1.9 million oz silver, and 40 million lbs lead.

Period 1970–1985

Since the late 1970s, with gold prices rising to $600-$800 an oz, many claims were staked again. Old prospects and mines were reexamined but did not proceed further than that. It was only in 1985, that efforts were made to reestablish the old great Alaska Juneau Mine.

The yield from the Mines in the Juneau Gold Belt during the period 1880–1983 was worth $157,000,000 from 6.7 million oz gold, 3.1 million oz silver, and 45 million lbs lead.

Period 1985–

Since 1985, many mining establishments are examining possibilities of restarting some of the mines like the great Alaska Juneau Mine. Alaska Mining Centre undertook the reevaluation study of the old mines under the Bureau of Mines, as part of the Mineral Land Assessment Program in the Juneau Mining District. This study by the Bureau covered about 85 mines from where 675 samples were collected to examine the further prospects. For the purposes of studies and sampling, the gold belt was geographically examined in three areas of: a)the Berners Bay, Bessie Mountain, Yankee Basin, and Eagle River areas; b) Spaulding Meadows and the Juneau and Douglas areas; and c) Areas south from Taku Inlet to Holkam Bay.

== Mines ==
=== Treadwell mine ===
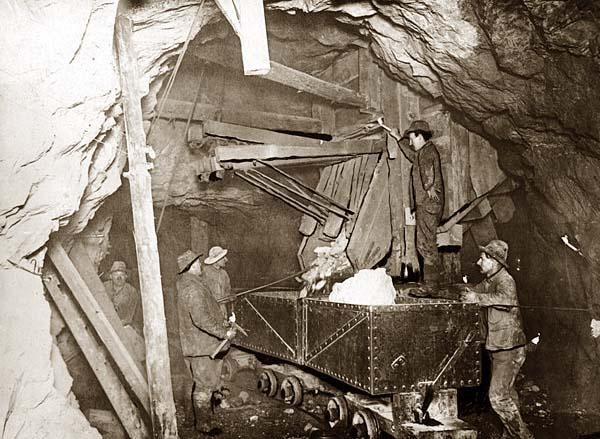
Miners in an under-sea part of the Treadwell mine, 1916

French Canadian prospector Pierre Erussard, known as "French Pete," found gold on Douglas Island, across Gastineau Channel from Juneau. A consortium led by John Treadwell, a carpenter from California, purchased the claims and adjoining gold-bearing land. The resulting mine/mill complex produced more than 3 million troy ounces (93 tonnes) of gold before closing in 1922.

=== Kensington & Jualin mines ===
The underground Kensington hardrock mine is approximately 45 miles (72 km) north of Juneau. The mine site is within the City and Borough of Juneau and the Tongass National Forest.

Development and ore production occurred at the Kensington mine site from 1897 through 1938. The adjacent, also underground, Jualin mine was discovered in 1895 and operated from 1896 to 1928. Together the mines produced 40,513 ounces of gold from 75,208 tons of ore.

Interest in the dormant mines was renewed during the 1980s and 1990s. The Kensington Project is now in the final stages of permitting. The proposed underground mine will produce approximately 2,000 tons of ore per day and 400 tons per day of development rock over an estimated 10 years. The project now encompasses both the Kensington and Jualin prospects. The proposed mine, access roads, and tailings disposal areas are located on federal land overseen by the U.S. Forest Service (USFS), State of Alaska tidelands, and on private patented property. The project will employ approximately 300 to 400 people during the 22 months required for construction of the facilities and 225 full-time employees to operate the mine and processing facilities. The operation will use a froth flotation process which involves crushing the ore then flooding the ore with water containing chemicals which combine with gold, float to the surface, and are skimmed off.

In 2009, the Supreme Court of the United States issued a 6–3 decision which ruled that the United States Army Corps of Engineers had properly issued a permit allowing mine slurry, crushed rock mixed with water, to be discharged as "fill" into Lower Slate Lake, a 23-acre (93,000 m^{2}) lake with a maximum depth of 50 feet (15 m). The Environmental Protection Agency deferred to the decision of the Corps of Engineers with respect to the discharge of waste into the lake, issuing a permit for discharge of treated water from the lake. While waste is being discharged into the lake surface waters are routed around it. A dam will be built to impound water as the original lake is filled by waste, the area of the lake being enlarged to 50 acres (200,000 m^{2}) over the life of the project. At the termination of the project the bottom of the lake will be coated with native material and the lake restocked. The alternative to use of the lake for waste disposal was building of tailing ponds which would have displaced wetlands. Enlargement of the lake will produce additional wetlands, at least according to the majority opinion in the Supreme Court case. Environmental groups maintain that this decision was made possible by an administrative rule change made by the Bush administration:

The Clean Water Act allows "fill material" to be put into waters for constructive purposes such as the creation of levees, seawalls, and the like, under permits issued by the Army Corps of Engineers. For decades the regulatory definition of "fill material" expressly excluded waste, meaning the Army Corps could not permit waste dumps in waters. In 2002 the Bush administration changed the definition of "fill" so that most solid material, including waste and contaminated materials, could be placed into waterways. In the Kensington Mine case, the Bush administration expanded its interpretation of the rule, through an informal EPA memo that was never subject to public notice or comment, to allow dumping of toxic, industrial wastewater slurries directly into lakes and other water bodies, a practice that had long been prohibited by EPA rules. The Court based its ruling on this informal memo.

The rule could be overturned by pending legislation, The Clean Water Protection Act, H.R. 1310, amending the Clean Air Act sponsored by Representatives Frank Pallone (D-NJ) and Dave Reichert (R-WA) and 151 cosponsors. Also a new or amended rule could be adopted or the informal memo withdrawn. A related controversy, also involving mining, and affected by the same rule change, is the practice of Mountaintop removal mining which involves dumping overburden into stream beds in adjacent valleys.

== See also ==
- Gold mining in Alaska
