= Jualin Mine =

Gold mine in Juneau, Alaska, United States

Coordinates: 58.8411°N 135.0471°W

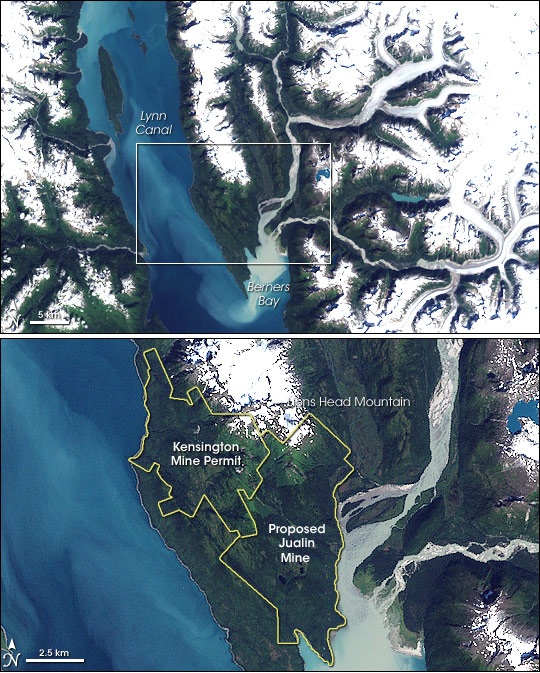
Location of Kensington Mine Lease and the defunct Jualin Mine.

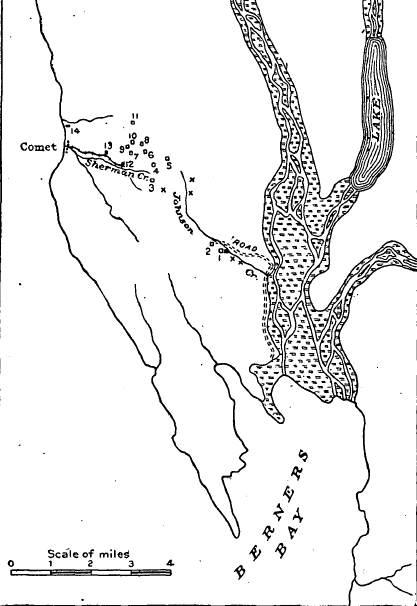
Berners Bay map with locations of key mines: 1-Jualin, 3-Comet, 4-Northern Belle, 6-Eureka, 7-Bear, 8-Kensington, 9-Savage, 10-Horrible, 11-Mellen

Jualin Mine is a defunct gold mine located within the City and Borough of Juneau, Alaska approximately 44 miles (71 km) northwest of downtown Juneau, Alaska. The Jualin gold deposit was discovered by prospector Frank Cook in 1895 and was initially mined by the Jualin Mining Company. A stamping mill with a daily capacity of 30 stone (0.19 t) of ore was installed early in the mine's operation. The mine operated intermittently from 1896 to 1901 and again from 1905 to 1908, when it was closed at a depth of 210 feet due to water infiltration and power shortages. In 1912, the mine was purchased by a Belgian group, which began investing in better equipment and deeper drilling. In 1914, the shaft was deepened to 325 feet, and mining took place at the 310-foot level. A drainage and haulage tunnel was planned to extend 7,800 feet (2,400 m) south of the mine to allow easy access to the mining levels, but the outbreak of World War I halted this effort when the extension was only 5,000 feet (1,500 m) long.

Following the end of the war, the mine was purchased by a new company named the Southeastern Alaska Mining Corporation, which aimed to put the mine back into service. This effort failed, however, and the mine remained unused until the late 20th century, when Coeur Alaska, a subsidiary of Coeur Mining, purchased mining rights to the Jualin and nearby Kensington mines. Today, Coeur Alaska leases the Jualin from Hyak Mining Company, which owns the property. The Jualin site is home to administration and support buildings for the Kensington mine, but Coeur Alaska is exploring the Jualin site for mining potential. From 1896 to 1919, 36,000 troy ounces (1,100 kg) of gold were extracted from the mine, making it the fourth most-productive mine in the Juneau Mining District (behind Alaska-Juneau (AJ), Perseverance and Treadwell) before the modern era.
