= Kowee Creek =

River in Juneau, Alaska, United States

Coordinates: 58°17′52″N 134°25′56″W

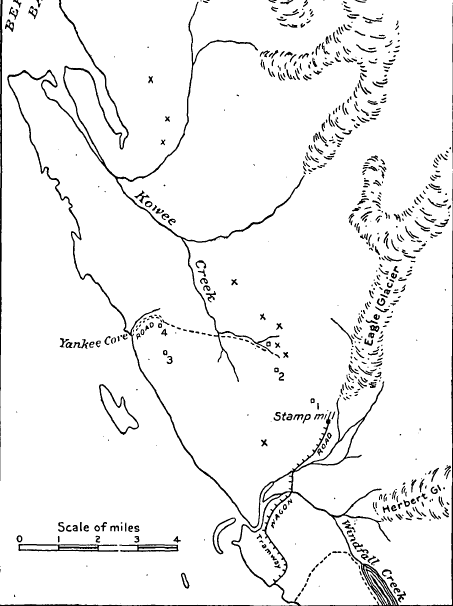
- USGS Bulletin map, 1906

Location
- Country: United States

Physical characteristics
- Source
  - location: near Mount Troy, Douglas Island
- Mouth
  - location: Gastineau Channel
  - elevation: 0 ft (0 m)

Kowee Creek (also spelled as Cowee, Kow-eeh, or Kowie) is a river on Douglas Island in the City and Borough of Juneau, Alaska, United States. Its origin is southeast of Mount Troy and it flows north-northeast to Gastineau Channel near West Juneau; it is 0.5 miles (0.80 km) southwest of the city of Juneau. Kowee Creek is nearly 10 miles (16 km) long. It has a drainage basin of about 50 square miles (130 km^{2}) and two transverse tributaries.

The creek is named for Chief Kowee, a leader of the Auke people of the late 19th century. He is credited with guiding Juneau founders Joe Juneau and Richard Harris to gold at Quartz Gulch in 1880. Kowee had a summer home at the mouth of the creek. Juneau-area miners spelled the creek as "Kow-eeh" or "Kowie"; when the United States Geological Survey mapped the area in 1903, it was spelled "Cowee". The naming issue was settled by the United States Board on Geographic Names in 1964.

In addition to Chief Kowee's use of the area, other Tlingit hunted and trapped throughout the Douglas Island area from the creek to Point Hilda.

Dolly Varden trout have been noted in the stream. It also formerly hosted a hatchery for pink and chum salmon and University of Alaska Southeast research facility. Salmon fishing in Kowee Creek is prohibited.

A trail runs near the river 3.3 miles (5.3 km) to the Dan Moller Cabin.

== See also ==
- Juneau gold belt
- Cowee Creek is another stream named for Chief Kowee, 30 miles (48 km) northwest of Juneau.
