= Ijichi =

Ijichi (written: 伊地知 or 伊秩) is a Japanese surname. Notable people with the surname include:

- Hikojirō Ijichi (伊地知 彦次郎, 1860–1912), Japanese vice admiral
- Hiromasa Ijichi (伊秩 弘将, born 1963), Japanese composer and music producer
- Kiyoshi Ijichi (伊地知 潔, born 1977), Japanese musician
- Ijichi Kōsuke (伊地知 幸介, 1854–1917), Japanese general
- Ijichi Suetaka (伊地知 季珍, 1857–1935), 12th Vice Admiral of Kure Naval District

== Fictional characters ==
- Kiyotaka Ijichi (伊地知 潔高), a character in Jujutsu Kaisen
- Nijika Ijichi (伊地知 虹夏), a character in Bocchi the Rock!
- Seika Ijichi (伊地知 星歌), a character in Bocchi the Rock!
