= Alaska-Juneau Gold Mining Company =

American mine corporation

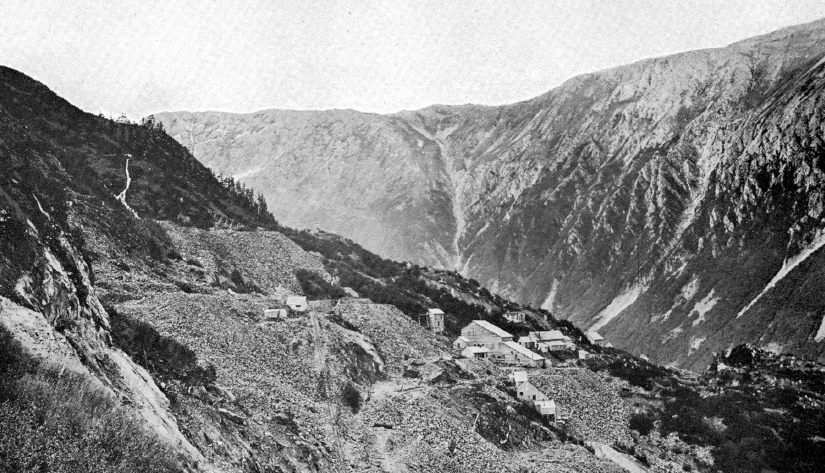
Alaska Juneau Gold Mine and Mill along Gold Creek, 1906

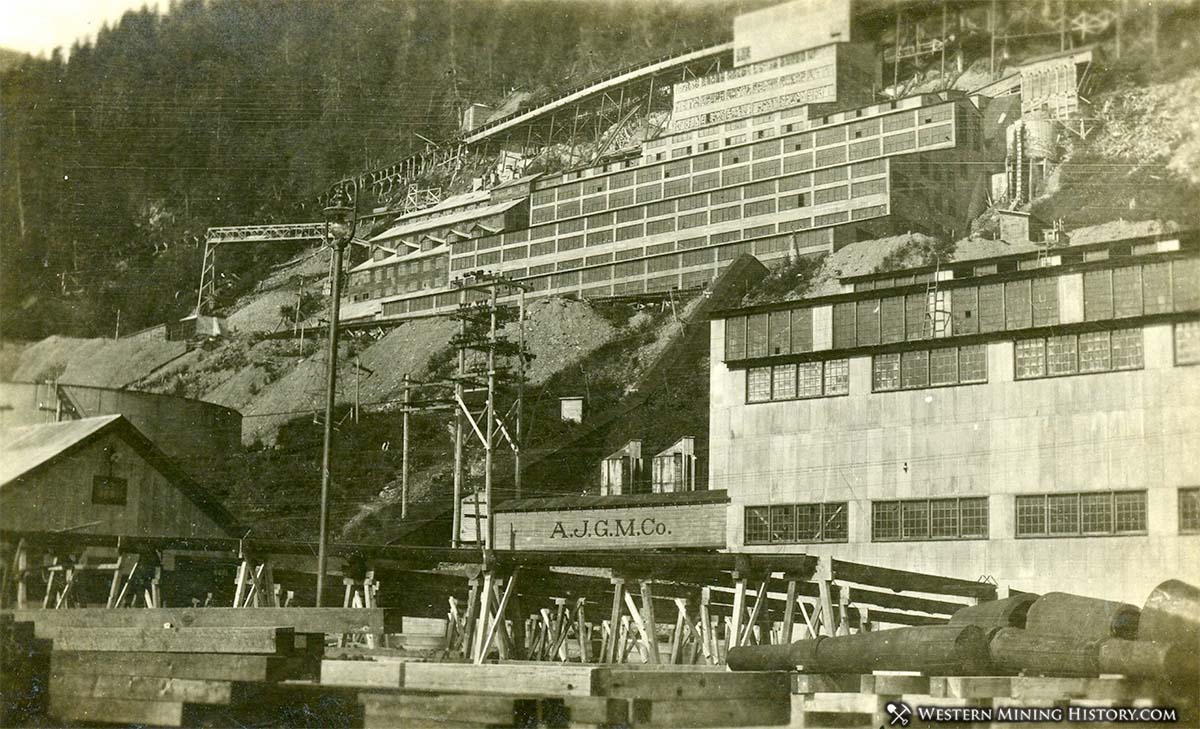
Alaska-Juneau GMC mill, early 1920s

The Alaska-Juneau Gold Mining Company (AJGMC) was incorporated under the laws of West Virginia, USA in 1897. Its lode mining claims covered approximately 402.37 acres (162.83 ha) on the wide vein called the Juneau gold belt of which it owned one mile on the outcrop.

== Mining properties and operations ==
The company's property was in Alaska's Juneau mining district. The AJGMC purchased over two dozen patented claims in the Silver Bow Basin for lode mining low grade gold ore. The main group of claims was about 4,800 feet (1,500 m) in length and about 1,600 feet (490 m) in width, occurring over approximately 209 acres (85 ha) on the southeast side of Gold Creek. About 90 acres (36 ha) of outlying group claims were in Snowslide Gulch. Tunnels and the mill site stretched to the Gastineau Channel.

The Alaska-Juneau mine was located 3 miles (4.8 km) from Juneau. The property also included the Lane & Hayward mine and the Bennet mine. The company's two stamp mills, driven exclusively by water power, were located on Gold Creek. Its 30-stamp mill was in operation from 1896 to 1914. The Ebner Gold Mining Company property adjoined the AJGMC on the northwest.

== Business operations ==
Its Transfer Agent was Central Trust Company while its Registrar was Metropolitan Trust Company. The corporation office was located in Charleston, West Virginia. The Annual meeting was held on the first Tuesday after the first Monday in April at the San Francisco office.

The AJGMC and the Alaska Treadwell Gold Mining Company had integrated management and stockholding interests as, in 1900, Frederick W. Bradley purchased a major interest in AJGMC. He became president of AJGMC and Treadwell. Philip R. Bradley, brother of Frederick, was resident manager during the period of 1914-1920. The business offices of both these companies, as well as the Alaska-Gastineau Mining Company, were in the Mill Building, San Francisco, California. The working offices and records were located at the Treadwell gold mine on the north side of Douglas Island. In 1922, the office and records were moved to the AJGMC mining area on the other side of the Gastineau Channel.

After the Alaska-Juneau mine closed in 1944 because of the World War II labor shortage, AJGMC sold its hydroelectric power to Alaska Electric Light & Power, Juneau's local utility company. In 1972, AEL&P purchased all of the AJGMC holdings.
