= Mount Troy =

Mountain in Alaska, United States

Highest point
- Elevation: 2,841 ft (866 m)
- Coordinates: 58°16′01″N 134°28′31″W

Geography
- Location: Juneau, Alaska, United States
- Parent range: Boundary Ranges
- Topo map: USGS Juneau B-2

Mount Troy is a mountain in the City and Borough of Juneau, Alaska, United States. It is a peak of the Boundary Ranges, located on Douglas Island, west of the head of Kowee Creek and 3 miles (4.8 km) southwest of the city of Juneau.

In 1950, the United States Forest Service named the mountain after John Weir Troy, the territorial governor of Alaska from 1933 to 1939. The name was made official by the United States Board on Geographic Names in 1952 and entered into the United States Geological Survey's Geographic Names Information System on January 1, 2000.

== See also ==
- Table Top Mountain
