= Frank Hamilton Nowell =

American photographer (1864–1950)

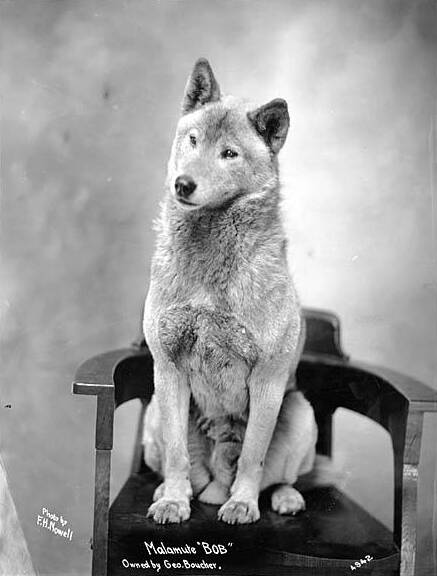
Bob, a Malamute

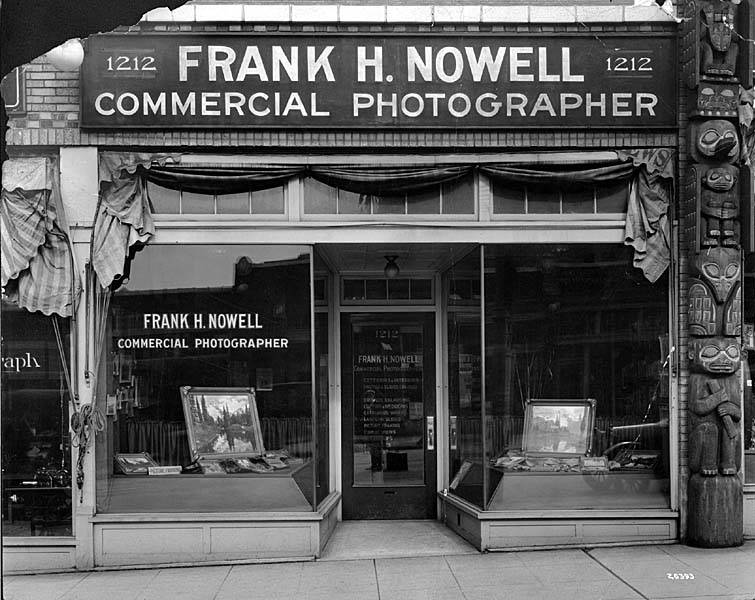
Frank Nowell's studio at 1212 4th Avenue in Seattle

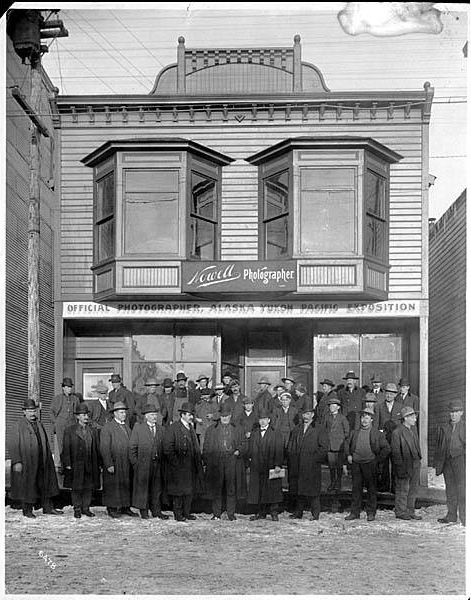
Nowell's studio

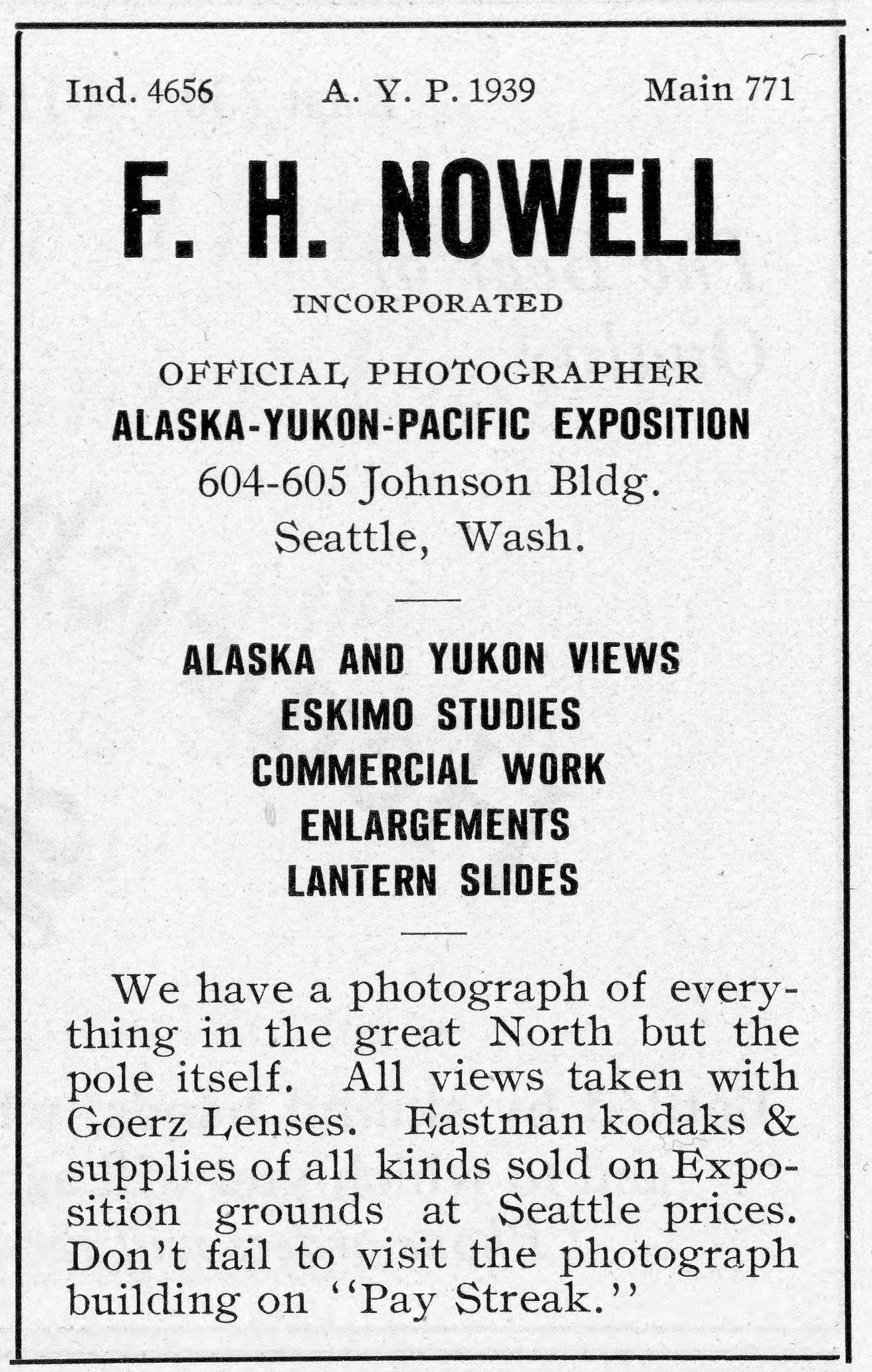
Advertisement for Nowell's studio

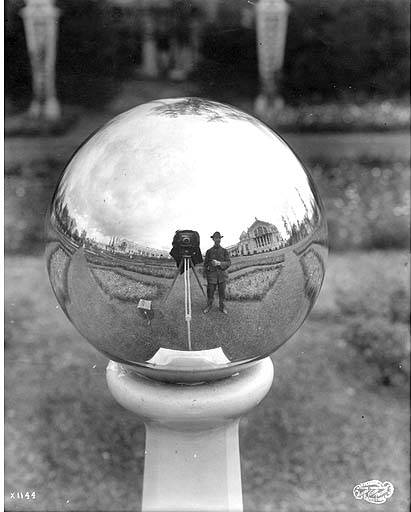
Self portrait at the Alaska Yukon Pacific Exposition in Seattle, 1909

Frank Hamilton Nowell (February 19, 1864 – October 19, 1950) was an American photographer who worked in Alaska and Seattle. His photos from Alaska include mining operations, panoramic vistas, ships, important buildings, and indigenous people. He was the official photographer for the Alaska Yukon Pacific Exposition of 1909 in Seattle.

Nowell was born in Portsmouth, New Hampshire, one of six sons. His parents were Thomas Nowell, the first Alaskan delegate to the Republican National Convention, and Lydia Ham Nowell.

In 1901, he was a mining agent.

He was the official photographer for the Alaska Yukon Pacific Exposition. The University of Washington Press published a book on him during the centennial of the exposition in 2009.

He photographed Siberian explorer Oskar Iden-Zeller circa 1905 and Roald Amundsen in Nome in 1906. He also photographed General Adolphus Washington Greely and his entourage arriving at the Golden Gate Hotel in Nome, August 1905. At the Exposition in 1909 he photographed Rear Admiral Hikojirō Ijichi.

Nowell advertised with the statement that he had photographs of everything in the Great North except the pole itself, a play on words for the North Pole.

== Gallery ==
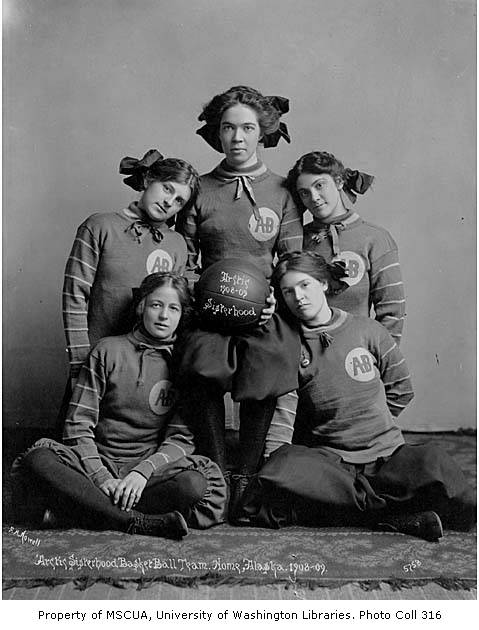
Arctic Sisterhood women's basketball team circa 1908

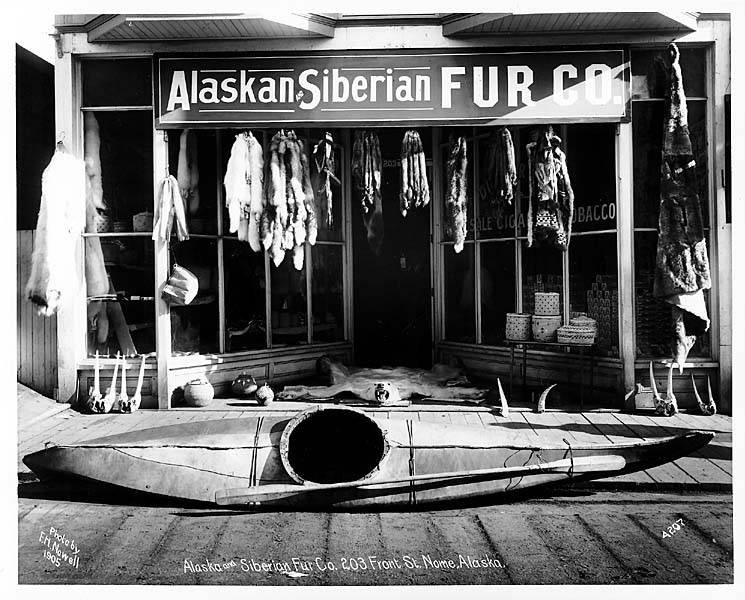
Alaskan and Siberian Fur Co. storefront

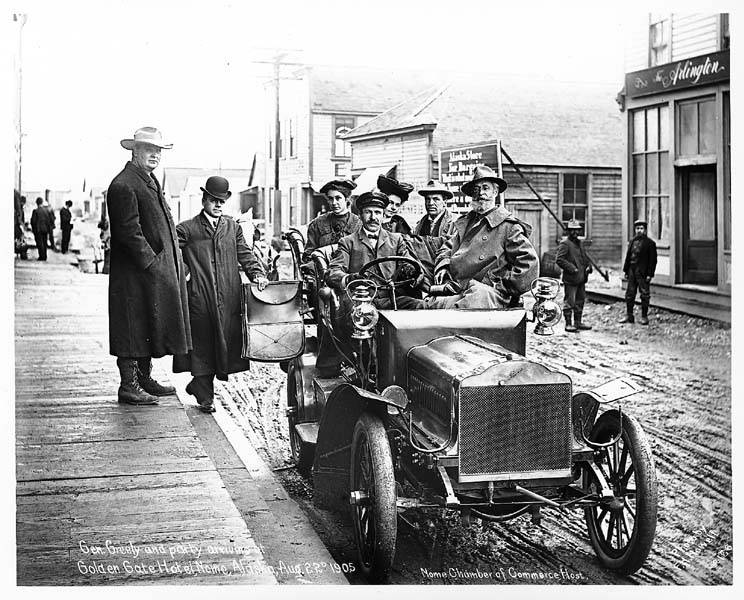
Gen. Adolphus Greely and party arriving at the Golden Gate Hotel, Nome (Aug. 1905)

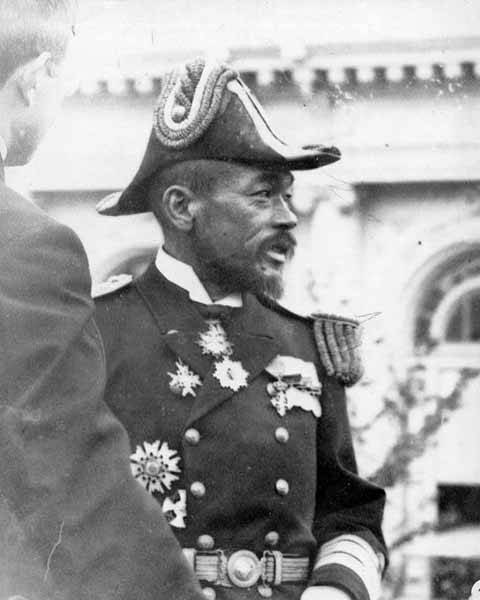
Rear Adm. Hikojirō Ijichi, Alaska–Yukon–Pacific Exposition, Seattle (1909)
