= Le Gardeur, Quebec =

Coordinates: 45°44′48.6″N 73°28′35.4″W

Le Gardeur
- Former city
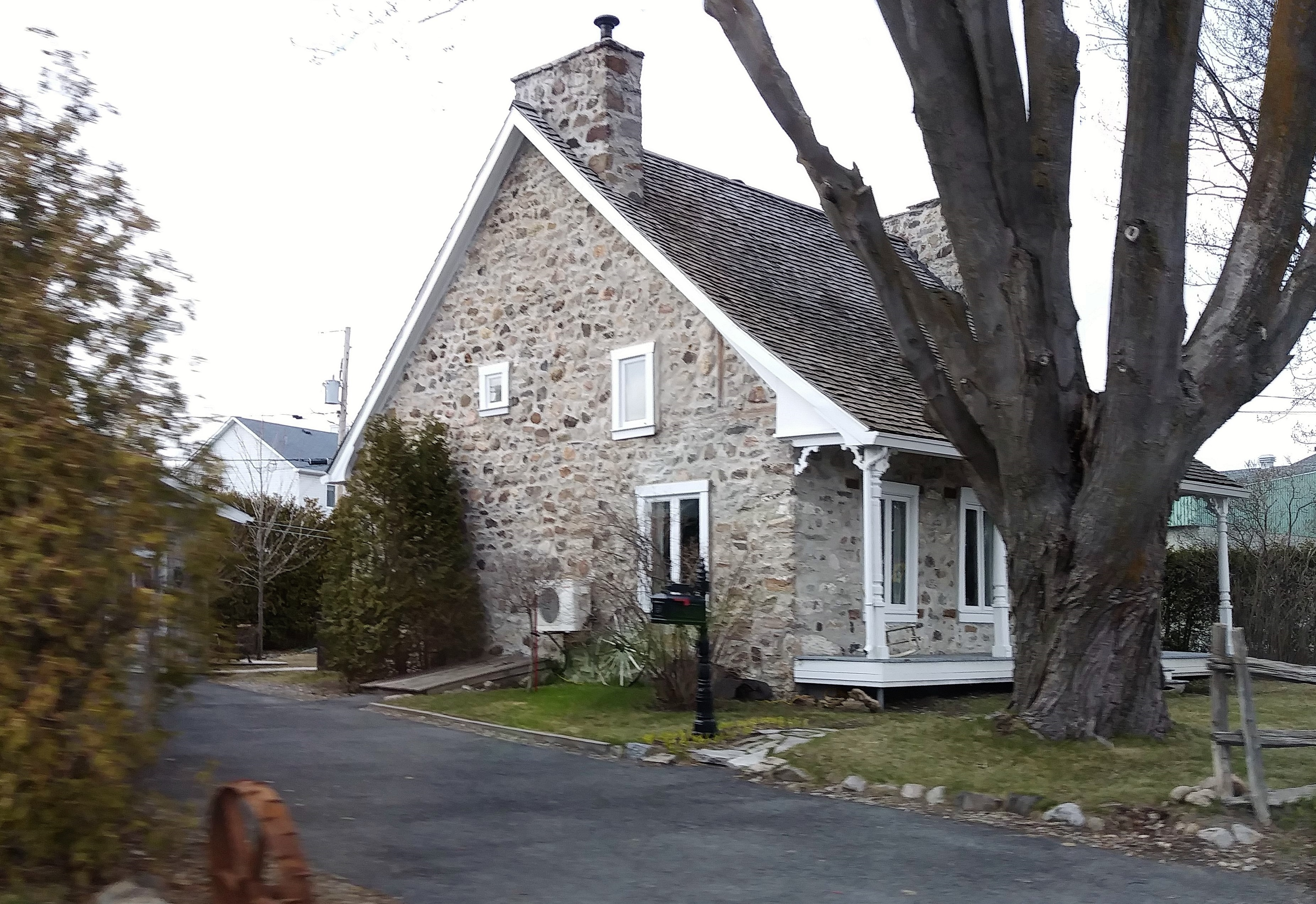
- Old house on boulevard Lacombe.
- Interactive map of Le Gardeur
- Country: Canada
- Province: Quebec

Area
  - Total: 37.29 km^{2} (14.40 sq mi)

Population (2016 Census)
  - Total: 21,413
  - Density: 574.2/km^{2} (1,487/sq mi)
  - Dwellings: 6,166
- 4.8% increase in population (1996–2001)

Le Gardeur (French pronunciation: [lə ɡaʁdœʁ]) was a city in southwestern Quebec, Canada. Since the 2002 municipal reorganization in Quebec, it has been a district of the city of Repentigny.

It is on the L'Assomption River in the Regional County Municipality of L'Assomption and is connected to Montreal by Route 138, Autoroute 40, and Via Rail on the Canadian National rail line.

The rural parish of Saint-Paul-l'Ermite was established in 1856. The municipality of the same name was created in 1973 over part of the original territory. It changed its name to Le Gardeur five years later. (Pierre Le Gardeur, Sieur de Repentigny, was the region's first feudal lord, under letters-patent granted in 1647 to the Compagnie des cent associés.) The parish and its church are still active.

Le Gardeur's main population is concentrated near the L'Assomption River in the southernmost part of the city, bordering the rest of Repentigny, and the Saint Lawrence River. The northern part is mostly farmland, and is being developed as a suburban area. This is where the March 2006 announced AMT Repentigny-Mascouche Line commuter train that began service in December 2014 turned off the existing Canadian National line onto its own right of way heading towards Terrebonne.

== Trivia ==
Joe Juneau was born on the territory of Saint-Paul-l'Ermite in 1836. Juneau, Alaska is named after him.

== Education ==
Sir Wilfrid Laurier School Board operates Anglophone public schools:

- Franklin Hill Elementary School in Repentigny
- Rosemere High School in Rosemere

== Notable people ==
- Samuel Piette - soccer player

== Sources ==
- Lapointe, Poitras. "Canadian Encyclopedia: Le Gardeur".
