= Gold Creek (Juneau, Alaska) =

Coordinates: 58.298824°N 134.419913°W

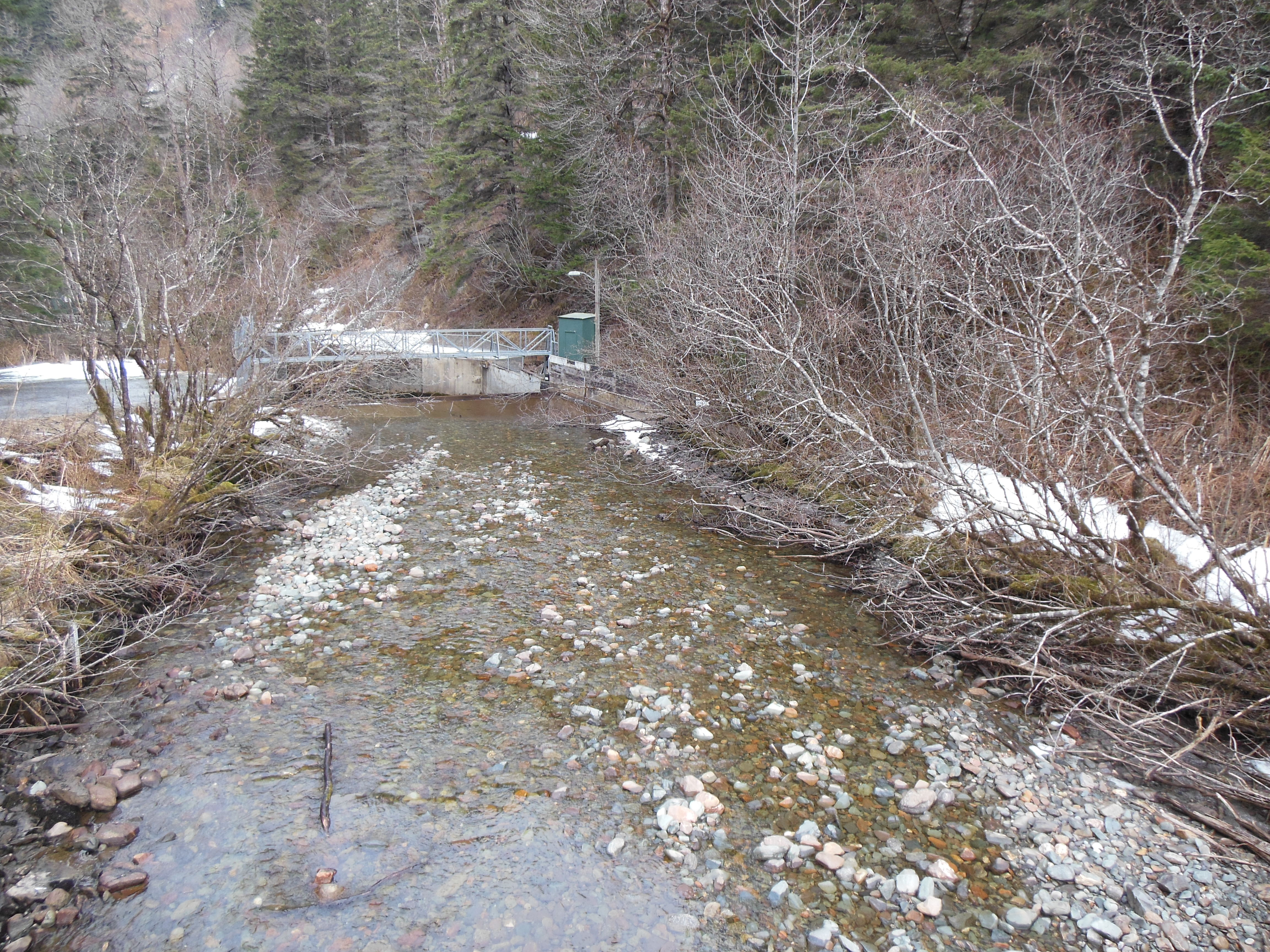
Gold Creek

Gold Creek (Lingít: Dzantikʼihéeni) is a waterway in the southeastern section of the U.S. state of Alaska. It is located in the Silver Bow Basin at the edge of Juneau. In 1880, Chief Kowee revealed to prospectors Joe Juneau and Richard Harris the presence of gold in Gold Creek; the city of Juneau was founded in the same year. Named by miners, the name was first published in 1883.

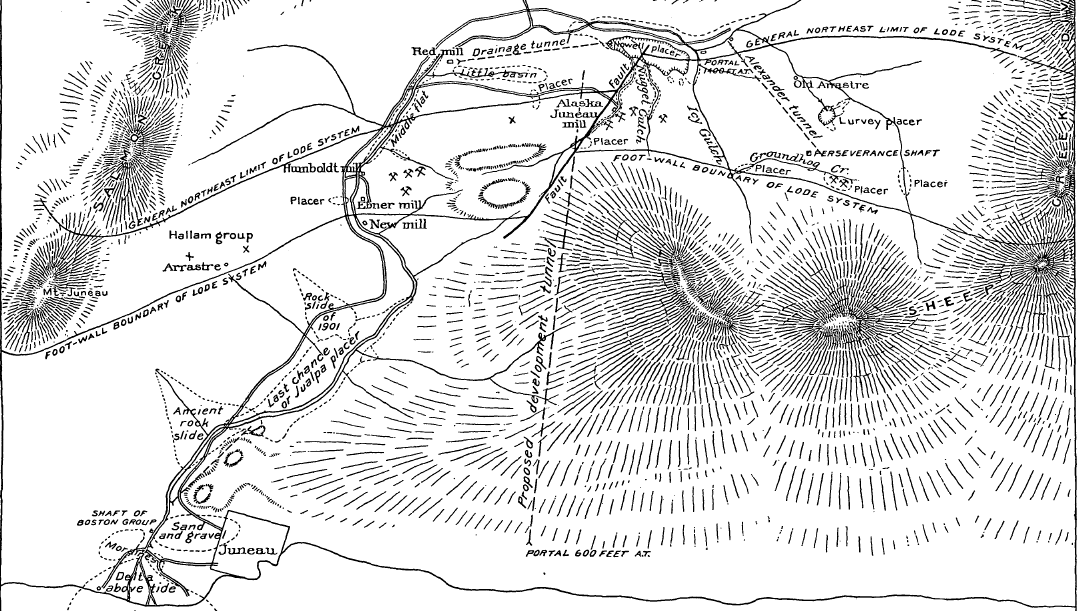
1906 map of the creek

The first gold placer claims of 4 Oct 1880 by Harris and Juneau were followed by quartz claims in the name of their employers Pilz and Fuller. These sixteen claims were subsequently the properties of the Ebner Gold Mining Company and the Alaska-Juneau Gold Mining Company. By 1 Jan 1881, 71 placer claims had been registered in the area.

Arrastras were in operation by 1881, with a five-stamp mill in operation by 1882 to work the Humboldt claim. In 1898, the Last Chance Hydraulic Mining Company was formed to develop the placer by the same name. By 1903, sixty miners were working the three mines in Gold Creek.

The mines are located on the "main lode system of the Juneau gold belt." The "principal rock of the mineral zone is black graphite and calcareous slate with quartz veining. The gold ore comes the quartz veins containing pyrrhotite, pyrite, galena, and zinc blende. Ore is also found in pyrrhotite within diorite dikes.

== See also ==
- Juneau gold belt
