= Berners Bay =

Berners Bay Dax̱anáak / Wóoshde X̱’al.át Yé
- Bay
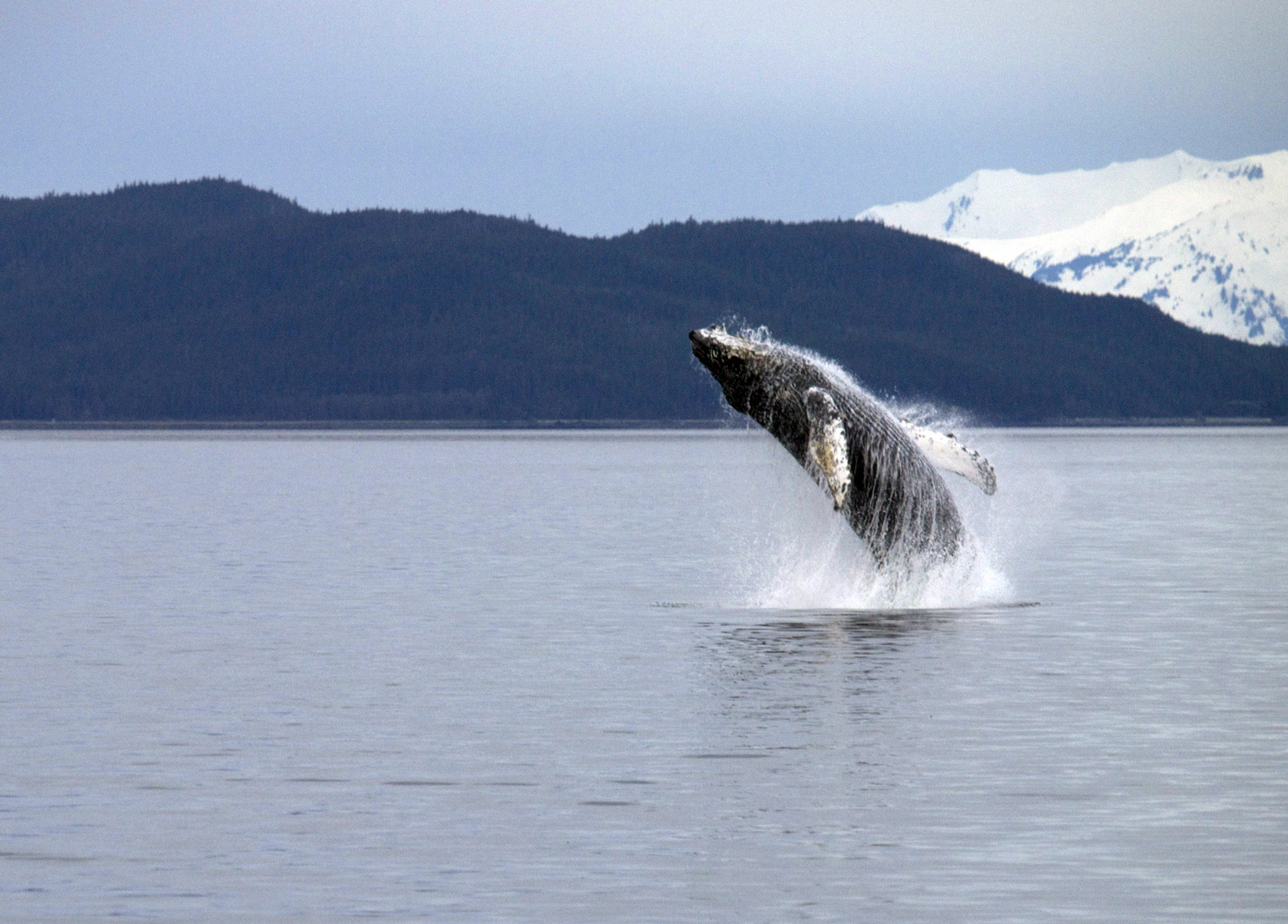
- A whale in Berners Bay

- Location in Alaska
- Coordinates: 58°44′38″N 134°58′16″W
- Country: United States
- State: Alaska
- Time zone: UTC-9 (Alaska (AKST))
  - Summer (DST): UTC-8 (AKDT)

Berners Bay (Lingít: Dax̱anáak or Wóoshde X̱’al.át Yé) is a waterway in the U.S. state of Alaska, approximately 40 miles (64 km) north of Juneau. It is a large and deep indentation, about 3.5 miles (5.6 km) wide at the entrance, which is formed by Point Bridget and Point St. Marys. It runs in a north-northwest direction for 6 miles (9.7 km) from Point Bridget, with a width of 3 miles (4.8 km) opposite Point St. Marys. The bay is surrounded by Tongass National Forest.

== History ==
Berners Bay, Point Bridget, and Point St. Marys were named by George Vancouver during his 1790s expedition to chart the Alaskan coastline; his mother's maiden name was Bridget Berners and she was born in St. Mary's Wiggenhall. Berners Bay was traditionally the place of Wooshkeetaan Auke people who collected blueberries, huckleberries, and nagoonberries at the bay. Auke smokehouses and a village existed near the bay and another village, Kutegan, was situated upstream at the confluence of the Lace River. The bay was used throughout the year by Auke for fishing operations, but is now deserted. The Clinton administration declared it as an Aquatic Resource of National Importance.

== Geography and geology ==
The bay is an estuary fed by four glacial rivers including the Antler River, Berners, and Lace Rivers, as well as Cowee Creek. It extends 12 miles (19 km) north into the interior. The protected cove is called Echo Cove. Extensive flats and several large streams are located at the head. The Berners Bay region forms the northwestern extremity of the auriferous mineralization zone on the mainland of Southeast Alaska known as the Juneau gold belt. It has been proposed to exploit the Kensington gold mine above the bay, but this has been subject to protests.

Gold is found in quartz veins associated with the diorite country rock.

== Flora and fauna ==
Wild blueberries, cranberries, huckleberries and nagoonberries are found here. The bay area is the largest berry picking area for the people of Juneau. Other vegetation, like salmon berry, devils club, and currant, are also reported. The Antler and Lace river mouths contain extensive herbaceous and sedge meadows, known as the Lyngbye's sedge meadows in the area, home to brown bears.

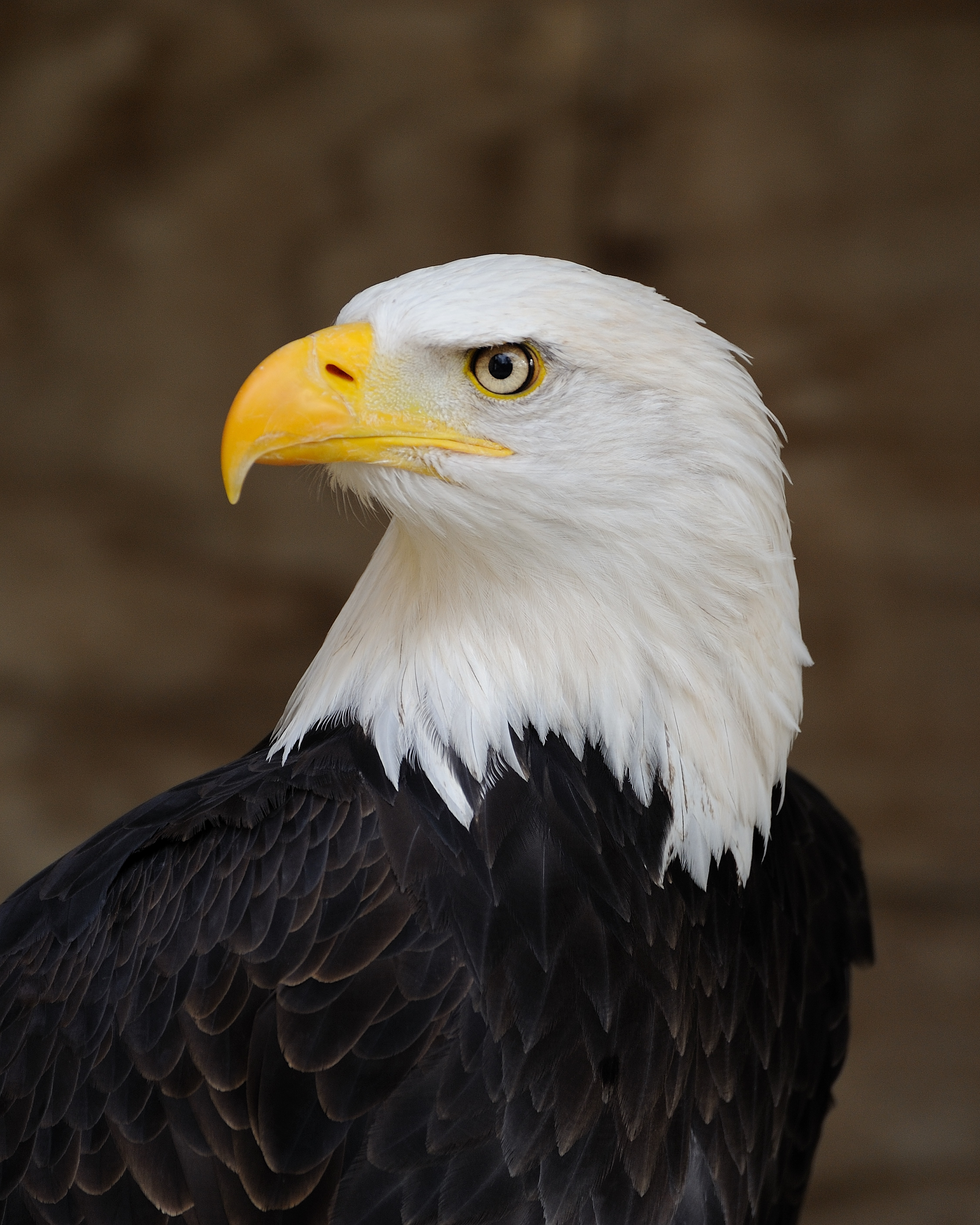
One of the greatest concentrations of bald eagles in Southeast Alaska is in Berners Bay

Every spring, millions of hooligan and herring come to the bay to spawn. Nearly 10 to 20 million of these fish lie above the bottom of the bay. The Steller sea lions feed on these hooligans and after feeding they move out of the bay towards the outer coast to breed and give birth to their pups. These sea lions are listed as a threatened species under the Endangered Species Act. It is also a breeding area for various species of Alaskan salmon. There are seals and humpback whales. Other fauna found along the river course upstream of the bay are mountain goats, mink, lynx, moose, wolverine, brown and black bears. The bay is reported to have one of the greatest concentrations of bald eagles, reported as the second largest in Southeast Alaska. Also reported around the bay are a very large number of shore birds and seabirds including mallards, pintail, green-winged teal, eagles, and gulls. After the hooligan run ends, which marks the beginning of the spring season, they die and float, and accumulate near the river banks where crows, ravens, and songbirds prey on their carcasses.

== Tourism ==
Kayaking from the protected Echo Cove to Berners Bay Cabin, over 8 miles (13 km) away, is a popular sport. The bay is also a recreation area for fishing, watching birds and whales, air boating, and camping.
