= Hikojirō Ijichi =

Japanese Vice Admiral (1860–1912)

- 伊地知 彦次郎
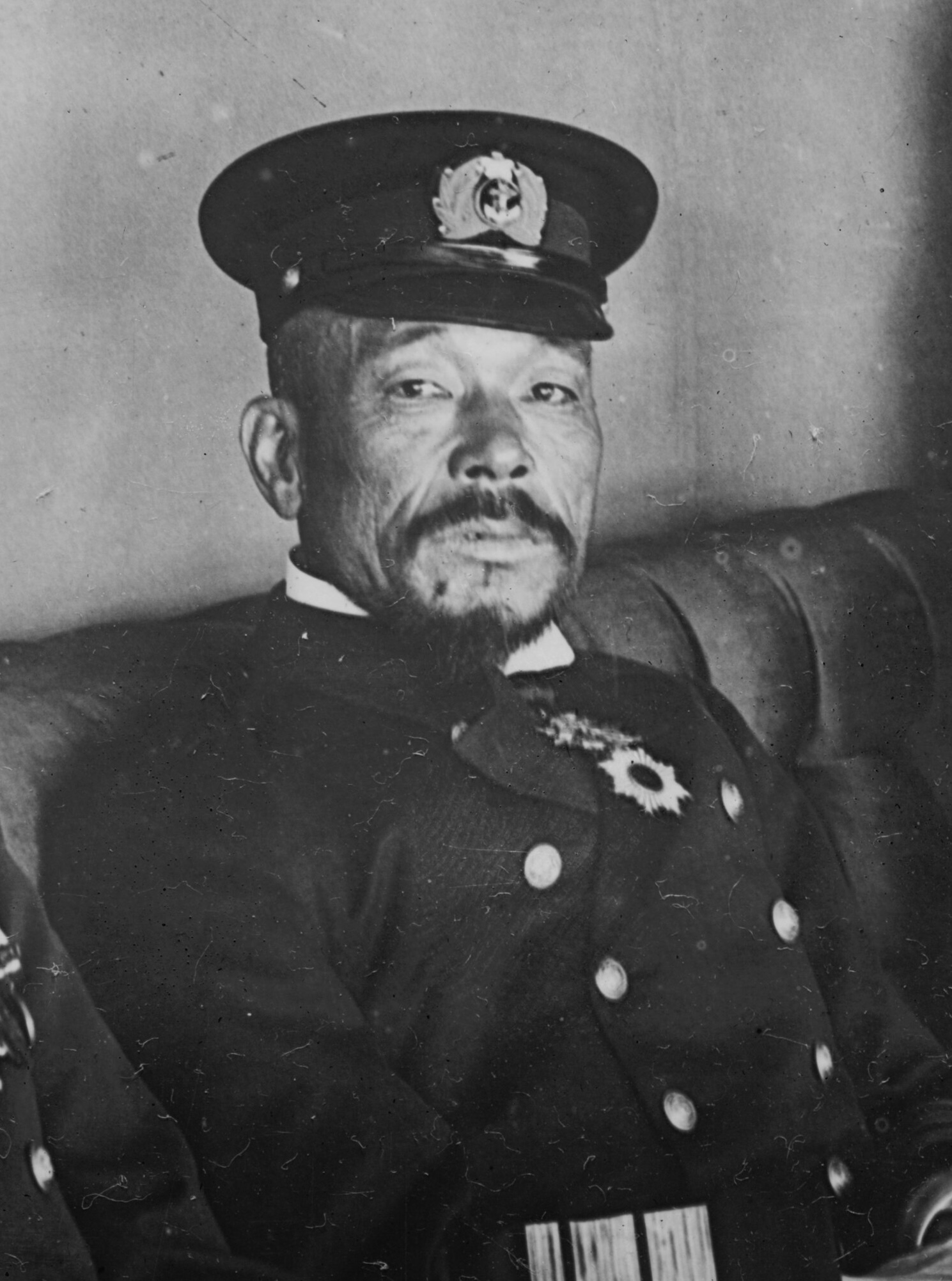
- Born: January 6, 1860; Satsuma Domain, Japan
- Died: January 4, 1912 (aged 51); Mita, Tokyo, Japan
- Military career
- Allegiance: Empire of Japan
- Branch: Imperial Japanese Navy
- Service years: 1883–1912
- Rank: Vice Admiral
- Commands: Mikasa
- Conflicts: First Sino-Japanese War; Russo-Japanese War; Battle of Tsushima

Hikojirō Ijichi (伊地知 彦次郎, Ijichi Hikojirō; January 6, 1860 – January 4, 1912) was a Japanese vice admiral during the Russo-Japanese War. He commanded the Japanese battleship Mikasa during the war, notably commanding it during the Battle of Tsushima.

== Biography ==
Hikojirō was born as the second son of Sueyoshi Ijichi at the Satsuma Domain. In October 1874, he entered the Imperial Japanese Naval Academy in its 7th term and graduated as a Navy Ensign on December 25, 1883. Initially, he worked at the Unebi and the Hōshō. He later became a secondary member of the Imperial Japanese Navy General Staff. He then served as a messenger of the Chief of the Yokosuka Naval District before heading for a business trip to France as well as the Japanese Embassy in Italy before serving as an instructor at the Naval War College. Ijichi then participated in the First Sino-Japanese War while he commanded the Japanese cruiser Hashidate. Around this time, he was promoted to Lieutenant-commander on December 16, 1891, Lieutenant on December 21, 1896, Commander on March 8, 1898 and Captain on December 7, 1900.

After serving at the Oshima and the Musashi as the Deputy Chief, he was given command of the Wu Torpedo Boat Corps. He was then promoted to a primary member of the Staff of the Imperial Japanese Navy General Staff and given command of the Fuji as its Deputy Chief. He was later made captain of the Tatsuda and served as the 2nd Division Chief of the Ministry of the Navy's Military Bureau. He was given further offices such as Captain of the Standing Fleet and the Captain of Matsushima. During the Russo-Japanese War, he served as the captain of the combined fleet flagship Mikasa and participated in the Battle of Tsushima.

After the war, he worked as the first director of the Navy Education Headquarters, and he was promoted to Rear-Admiral in November 1906. He served as the second director of the Education Headquarters, the commander of the training squadron, and a member of the general council. He was then promoted to Vice Admiral in December 1910. He served as commander of the Mako Guard District and a member of the General Assembly but died while in that office on January 4, 1912.

== Awards ==
- Order of the Sacred Treasure
  - 6th Class (May 15, 1895)
  - 2nd Class (May 20, 1909)
- Military Medal of Honor (November 18, 1895)
- Order of the Rising Sun
  - 5th Class (November 30, 1895)
  - 4th Class with Golden Rays (May 30, 1905)
  - 2nd Class, Gold and Silver Star (January 4, 1912)
- Order of the Golden Kite, 3rd Class (April 1, 1906)

=== Foreign Awards ===
- Italy: Order of Saints Maurice and Lazarus, officer (March 14, 1895)
- Italy: Order of the Crown of Italy
  - 4th Class (April 20, 1893)
  - 3rd Class (June 30, 1902)
