= Silver Bow Basin =

Valley in Alaska, United States

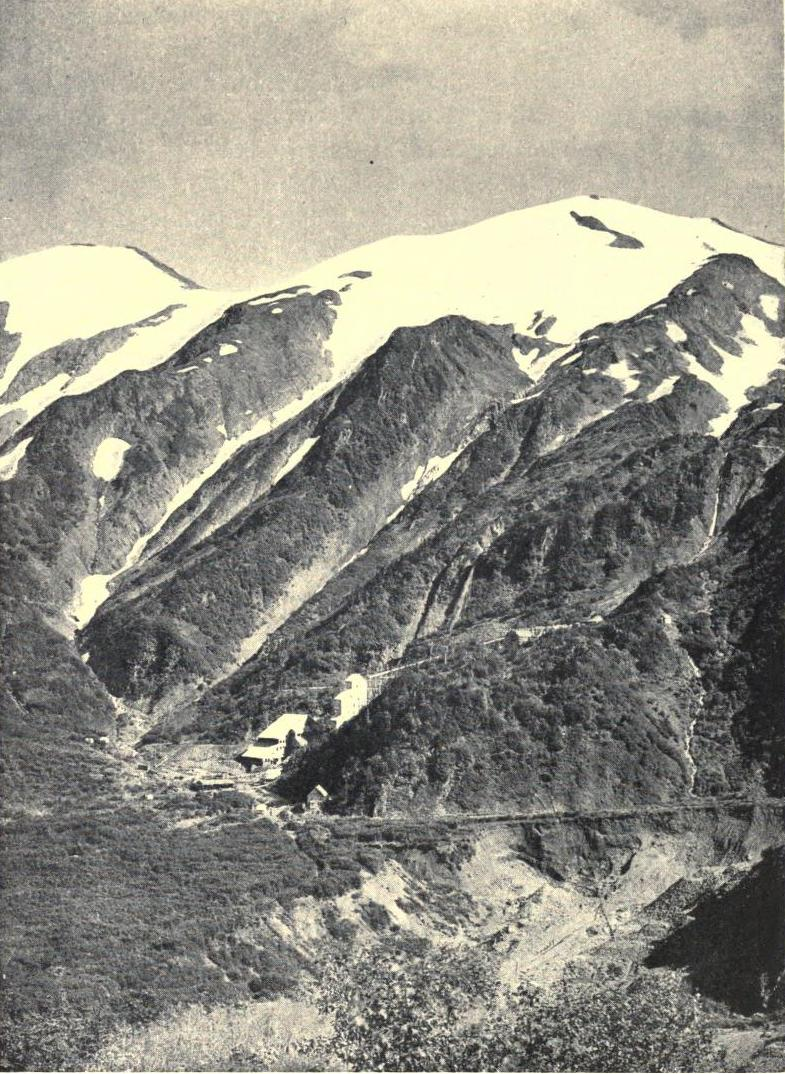
- Silver Bow Basin, 1908

- Location within Alaska
- Floor elevation: 1,250 ft (380 m)

Geography
- Coordinates: 58°18′40″N 134°20′34″W
- Interactive map of Silver Bow Basin

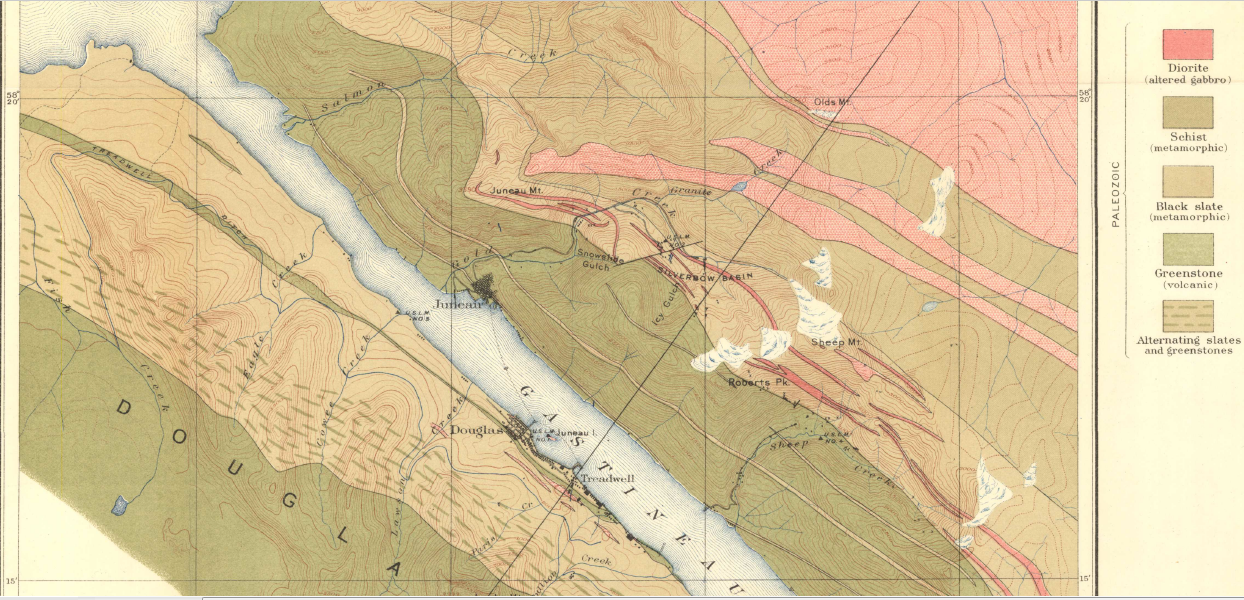
Geological map of the Silver Bow Basin (center right)

The Silver Bow Basin, often written as Silverbow Basin, is a valley located 2.4 miles (3.9 km) northeast of Juneau, Alaska, United States. It is situated on Gold Creek in an area north of Icy Gulch, and approximately 1.5 miles (2.4 km) north of Gastineau Peak. A trail from Juneau leads directly to the mountainside. The basin was the site of the earliest gold discovery in the Juneau area, leading to the establishment of the town called Juneau.

== Etymology ==
There are opposing theories as to who named the basin. One version states that it was named by Richard Harris after the mine in Silver Bow, Montana. Another theory is that it was named by a party of Montana miners in honor of their last camp in Montana.

== History ==
Placer was found in the basin's Gold Creek in 1880 by Richard Harris and Joe Juneau. This gold discovery led to the creation of the town called Juneau. Over the next nine years, sluicing operations recovered thousands of ounces of gold. Sitka engineer George E. Pilz is closely connected to development in the basin, as well as having grubstaked the prospectors Harris and Juneau. By the end of the decade, large scale hydraulic mining was in operation. The mines were reached by a 3.5 miles (5.6 km) wagon road that zig-zagged across the hill.

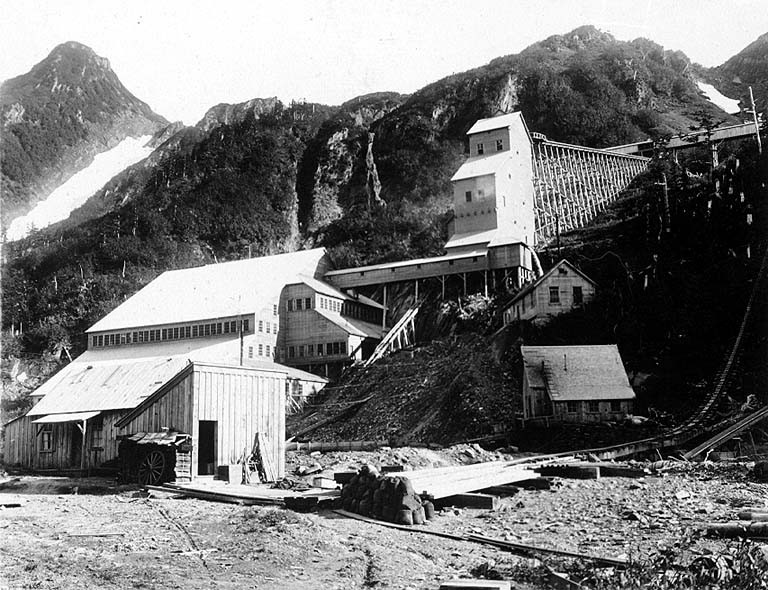
Alaska Perseverance Co. mine and buildings at Silverbow Basin, August 1910

Both quartz and placer mines operated in the basin, but because of climatic conditions, it was impossible to carry on milling operations in the basin itself for more than five or six mouths during the year. The largest of the mines was the Perseverance. The Fuller First Mine was the first quartz location in the basin. In 1890, Archie Campbell installed a revolving Dodge mill on the Fuller First. Over fifty placer claims on the basin's level floor were owned by the Silver-Bow Basin Mining Company, of Boston, while the Eastern Alaska Mining and Milling Company's mill was at the extreme end of the basin. In 1890, the Silver Bow Basin Mining Company properties were transferred to the Nowell Gold Mining Company, which worked the placer deposits until 1902. In 1897, the Alaska-Juneau Gold Mining Company incorporated and it purchased over two dozen claims in the basin between the Perseverance and Ebner mines in order to lode mine their low grade gold ore. The Lervey Basin placer claim was opened in 1899 a mile above Silver Bow Basin. In 1915, it was reported that a 2 miles (3.2 km) tunnel was being driven through the ridge between Sheep Creek and Silver Bow Basin, to connect with a crosscut from the shaft on the thirteenth level. The purpose of the tunnel was to transport mined ore to the mills on the Gastineau Channel. Total production estimates exceed 50,000 ounces (1,400,000 g) of gold.

A parish of the Cathedral of the Nativity of the Blessed Virgin Mary, mother church of the Roman Catholic Diocese of Juneau, was created in 1885 for the growing mining community.

== Geography ==
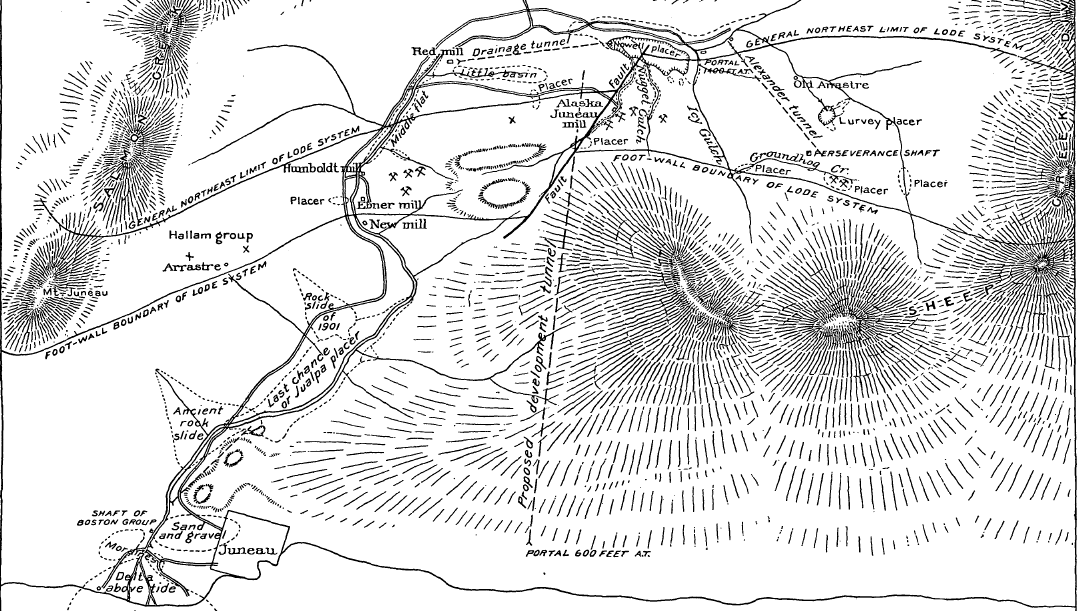
Map of the Gold Creek area showing the location of the Perseverance shaft (top right)

A glacier, which formerly extended to the mouth of Gold Creek and built up the moraines, excavated the depression that forms the basin. Subsequently, it was occupied by a lake that was separated from the lower portions of the creek by a solid rock divide. Lurvey Creek forks into North Lurvey Creek and East Lurvey Creek above the basin. The basin's lake beds are auriferous. Although the creek was filled with ice, there are patches near the basin which were not subjected to glaciation. The postglacial lake basin is filled with gravels from several creeks including Gold, Icy, Lurvey, Nugget, as well as Quartz Gulches. The basin ores are principally gold with small amounts of silver, zinc, or lead. Granite rocks are located in the northwestern part of the basin.

Silver Bow Basin is approximately 3,000 feet (910 m) long and 1,000 feet (300 m) wide, at an altitude of 1,250 feet (380 m).
