= Joe Juneau (prospector) =

French-Canadian gold prospector and co-founder of Juneau, Alaska

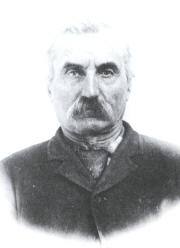
- Born: 28 May, 1836; Saint-Paul-l'Ermite, Lower Canada (present day Repentigny)
- Died: 1 March, 1899 (aged 62); Dawson City, Yukon, Canada
- Resting place: Evergreen Cemetery
- Occupation(s): Miner, prospector
- Known for: Co-founding of Juneau, Alaska
- Spouse: Delphine Juneau
- Children: 8
- Relatives: Solomon Juneau (cousin)

Joseph Juneau (French: [ʒozɛf ʒyno]; May 28, 1836 – March 1, 1899) was a French Canadian miner and prospector known for co-founding, with Richard Harris, the city of Juneau, Alaska, United States. The city has been the political capital of Alaska since 1900.

== Biography ==
Joseph Juneau was born in the Lower Canada town of Saint-Paul-l'Ermite (later renamed Le Gardeur and now incorporated into the city of Repentigny) to François Xavier Juneau dit Latulippe and Marguerite Thiffault Juneau.

Juneau's Native American guide in southeastern Alaska was Chief Kowee, who is credited with exploring much of the area later named for Juneau. Harris and Juneau were sent with Kowee by George Pilz, an entrepreneur and mining engineer from Sitka. After trading much of their grubstake for hoochinoo, or homebrew, they returned to Pilz empty-handed but were promptly sent back to the Juneau area. There, Kowee took them beyond Gold Creek (near what is now the site of the city's Federal Building) to Silver Bow Basin. Today, a creek on Douglas Island is named Kowee Creek. After the discovery of gold in the area, Harris and Juneau carried approximately 1,000 pounds of gold ore back to Sitka.

The settlement founded by Juneau and Harris was originally called Harrisburg or Harrisburgh, and later Rockwell. Miners often used both names in their records. There was also a proposal to name the town Pilzburg in honor of Pilz. The town received its current name at a miners' meeting on December 14, 1881, at which the name Juneau received 47 of the 72 votes cast, while Harrisburg received 21 votes and Rockwell only four. Joe Juneau reportedly bought drinks for fellow miners to persuade them to name the city in his honor.

Juneau traveled to Dawson City, Yukon during the Klondike Gold Rush of the 1890s. He usually spent his gold as fast as he mined it, but at the end of his life he owned a small restaurant in Dawson. Juneau died of pneumonia in March 1899 in Dawson. His body was brought back to the town that bears his name and was buried in the city's Evergreen Cemetery on August 16, 1903. His cousin Solomon Juneau founded the city of Milwaukee, Wisconsin.

== See also ==
- Juneau mining district
