= Richard Harris (prospector) =

Irish American miner and prospector (1833–1907)

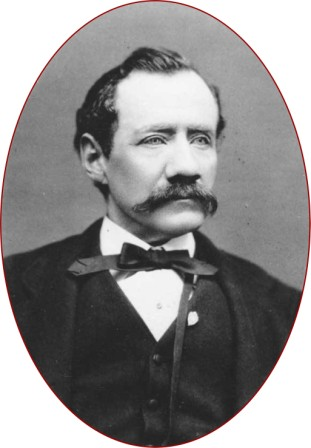
- Richard Harris
- Born: Richard Tighe Harris; October 31, 1833; Banbridge, United Kingdom
- Died: October 11, 1907 (aged 73); Portland, Oregon
- Education: Girard College
- Occupation: Prospector
- Known for: Founding of Juneau, Alaska (with Joe Juneau)

Richard Tighe Harris (October 31, 1833 – October 11, 1907) was an Irish American miner and prospector best known for co‑founding the city of Juneau, Alaska, with fellow prospector Joe Juneau following their discovery of gold in 1880. His work helped establish the early mining industry in southeastern Alaska that led to the rapid growth of what would become the territorial capital.

== Early life and education ==
Richard "Dick" Harris was born in Banbridge, County Down, Ireland. He emigrated to the United States in the mid‑19th century, lived in Pennsylvania and Ohio. He then attended Girard College, a private boarding school in Philadelphia, Pennsylvania before taking up gold prospecting in the American West.

== Prospecting and founding of Juneau ==
Richard Harris is most famous for co-founding, with Joe Juneau, the city of Juneau, Alaska. The first major gold discovery in Juneau or Douglas Island (across from Juneau) was around 1880. The settlement that grew from this discovery later became the political capital of Alaska in 1906.

In 1879, Harris traveled to Sitka, Alaska, where he was employed by mining engineer and entrepreneur George Pilz, who was seeking high-grade ore to supply a stamp mill he was establishing there. That same year, the Tlingit leader Chief Kowee brought gold-bearing ore samples from the interior basin along Gastineau Channel to Pilz, helping convince him that the area warranted further exploration.

In the summer of 1880, Pilz sent Harris and Joe Juneau to prospect in southeastern Alaska. They departed Sitka on July 19, 1880, accompanied by their Native Alaskan guide, Chief Kowee. On August 17, Harris recorded in his diary that he and Juneau discovered a creek flowing into Gastineau Channel, which Harris named Gold Creek. They found modest placer gold and gold-bearing quartz there but, with provisions running low, returned to Sitka after only a short exploration.

During this first expedition, Harris and Juneau traded with the natives much of their grubstake for hoochinoo. When they returned to Pilz with little to show for their efforts, he was dissatisfied. Chief Kowee later stated that much of the delay was due to prolonged drinking and the loss of their boat after it was left untied. Despite this, Pilz sent Harris and Juneau back to the Gastineau Channel because he had no other prospectors available. Once back, Kowee ensured their prospects and personally took them beyond Gold Creek (which today flows beside the Hurff Ackerman Saunders Federal Building and Robert Boochever U.S. Courthouse) to Silver Bow Basin. Today, a creek on Douglas Island is named Kowee Creek in recognition of Chief Kowee’s role in the discovery.

The Aakʼw Ḵwáan Tlingits referred to the area around Gold Creek as Dzántik’i Héeni, roughly meaning “creek at the base of the flounder-shaped hill.” Indigenous people were involved in early mining operations, serving as packers, hunters, and laborers, and they provided crucial local knowledge that aided the establishment of the mining camp.

After the discovery of gold in Juneau, Harris and Juneau loaded approximately 1,000 pounds of gold ore back to Sitka.

The town did not take its current name immediately; originally, it was known as Harrisburg, Pilzburg, and Rockwell. Juneau was able to buy votes from enough of his fellow miners for the name to be changed; this came after "Joe Juneau was complaining that nothing in the district had been named for him". Today, Harris Street still exists in Juneau.

Both Harris and Juneau are buried in the city's Evergreen Cemetery.

== Later career and personal life ==
Following the initial mining success, Harris continued prospecting and later worked for several mining companies and territorial institutions, including stints with the U.S. Customs Service and as a court clerk. He married Kitty, a Tlingit girl from Hoonah, around 1880 (Kitty was age 13 at the time), and the couple had four children, two of whom survived into adulthood.

== Final years and death ==
Harris’s eyesight and health deteriorated in the early 1900s. Harris lived most of the remainder of his life in Juneau; Earlier accounts stated that he spent his final years in a nursing home operated by the Masonic Order in Portland, Oregon. However, archival records indicate that he was a patient at Morningside Sanitarium, a psychiatric care facility in Portland that housed many Alaskans committed from the territory at the time. He was sent there August 19 of 1905.

He died at Morningside on October 11, 1907, at the age of 73. His body was returned to Juneau and interred at Evergreen Cemetery on December 28, 1907.

== Legacy ==
A memorial erected by Igloo No. 6 of the Pioneers of Alaska in downtown Juneau commemorates Richard T. Harris and Joseph Juneau, who landed at the site on August 15, 1880, discovered gold, and established the camp that led to the founding of Juneau, the first non-Native settlement in Alaska under U.S. possession.

It was at a meeting called to arrange details for the last rites of Richard Harris, "which every old timer within reach of the vicinity attended", that a motion was made to make the organization of The Pioneers of Alaska a solidified organization.

Jules Verne mentions the founding of Juneau in his novel Le Volcan d'Or (part 1, chapter V)

== Sources ==
- University of Alaska, Anchorage Archives
