= Paul Rosenthal =

Paul Rosenthal may refer to:

- Paul Rosenthal (Colorado politician), member of the Colorado House of Representatives
- Paul Rosenthal (Minnesota politician) (born 1960), member of the Minnesota House of Representatives
- Paul Rosenthal (violinist) (born 1942), American violinist
