= Juneau Jazz & Classics =

Juneau Jazz & Classics is an annual music festival held in Juneau, Alaska.

== History ==
Founded in May 1987 by Linda Rosenthal, the festival celebrates jazz, classical, and blues music. It includes performances by solo artists and musical groups covering diverse styles plus educational concerts and instructional workshops.

Juneau Jazz & Classics is a private, 501(c)(3), nonprofit organization. Its mission is to provide a rich musical experience to music lovers in Juneau, the remote towns of Southeast Alaska, and the State of Alaska.

Most of the 2020 festival was scrapped, caused by the COVID-19 pandemic.

== Today ==
In addition to the spring festival, the organization has grown to include an annual string workshop in the fall held at the University of Alaska Southeast for students of the violin and viola. Throughout the year, around 4,000 students participate in workshops, school concerts, clinics, and a scholarship program that are part of Juneau Jazz & Classics.
