= Tahku =

Whale sculpture in Juneau, Alaska, US

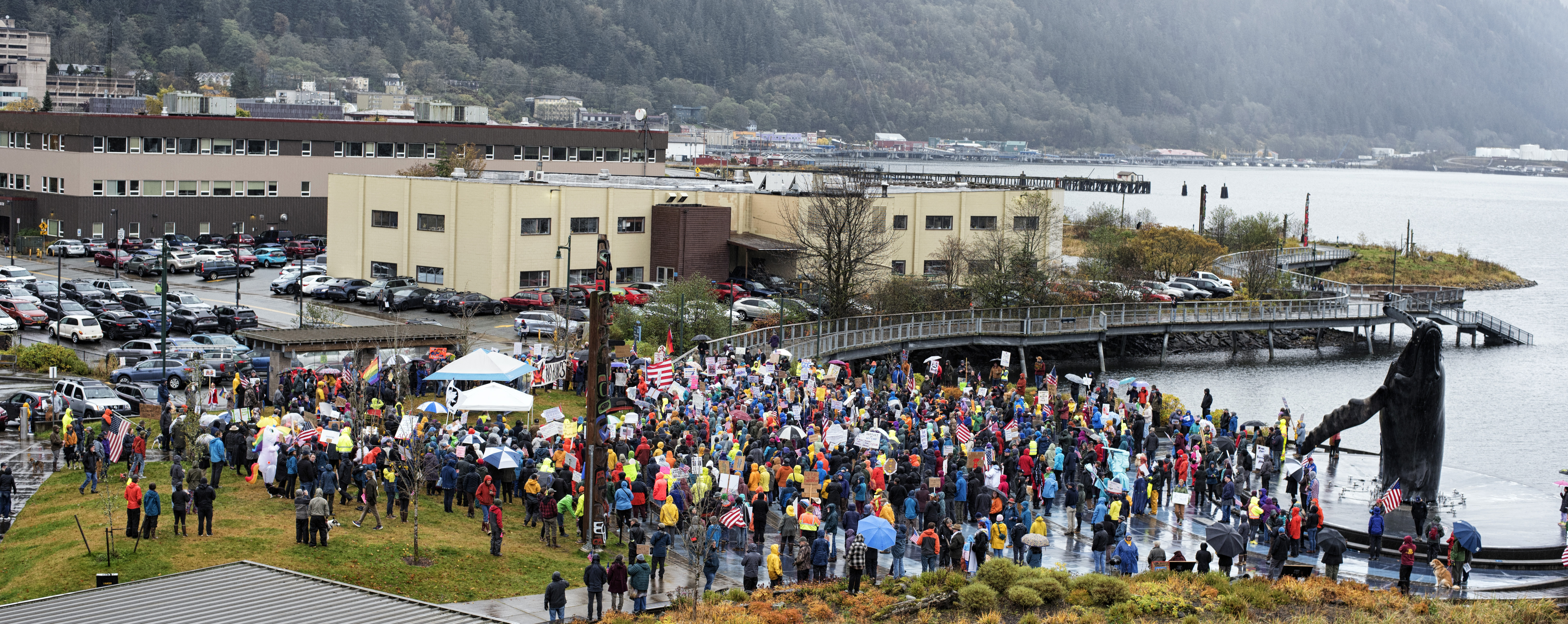
- Tahku at the October 2025 No Kings protests in Juneau
- Artist: R. T. Wallen
- Year: 2018
- Medium: Bronze sculpture
- Subject: Humpback whale
- Weight: 6.5 tons
- Location: Juneau, Alaska, US; 58°17′57″N 134°25′35″W

Tahku is a life-size bronze sculpture of a humpback whale in Juneau, Alaska, United States, erected in 2018. The name comes from the Tlingit term for "fierce winds", also connected to the Taku people.

== Description ==
Tahku is a bronze sculpture of a breaching humpback whale standing at 25 feet (7.6 m) tall and weighing 6.5 tons. It is accompanied by a fountain that replicates the effect of water streaming off of the animal's body as it breaches. The fountain's "whale breach sequence" is five minutes long and takes place every thirty minutes. It is located in Mayor Bill Overstreet Park in Juneau, Alaska.

== History ==
The sculpture was funded by the City and Bureau of Juneau as part of a partnership with a nonprofit organization called the Whale Project that was created to finance and develop the project in 2007. The project was started to commemorate the fiftieth year of Alaska's statehood in the United States and took ten years to complete. Tahku was sculpted by R. T. Wallen, and the water feature was designed by Chris Roy with Outside the Lines, a design-build firm based in Anaheim, California.

On September 3, 2016, more than 100 people gathered together on Juneau's waterfront for the welcoming ceremony for the sculpture. The statue's size required that it be constructed in several separate pieces, requiring trucking from the foundry and then transport by ferry. The formal dedication of the sculpture took place in 2017. The fountains and waterworks were installed in May 2018. Tahku faced controversy during development because Juneau charges a per-person tax on cruise ship passengers. Because such taxes were used by the city to construct Overstreet Park, where the sculpture is located, the local cruise industry cited the statue as a perceived irresponsible use of such taxes. The statue has served as the site of live theater events in the park.

On September 2, 2025, Tahku served as the site of a Labor Day demonstration, with 85 people present. The next month, the statue served as the site of the October 2025 No Kings protests in Juneau, and over 1,500 people gathered for this event. Around 1,000 people gathered at the statue again for the March 2026 No Kings protests.
