= Linda Rosenthal (violinist) =

American violinist

Linda Rosenthal is an American violinist and has performed internationally. She lived with her parents and siblings in South Bend, Indiana. Her father enjoyed playing the viola and performed chamber music.

She coaches faculty musicians at the Lake Placid Music Seminar in Lake Placid, New York northwest of Albany. Linda and her husband Paul Rosenthal moved to Fairbanks, Alaska in 1969 (Paul's brother lived in Fairbanks at the time) and then to Juneau in 1974. Linda helped start the Juneau Jazz & Classics music festival in 1985 and was the artistic director of it for thirty years. In 1995, Linda Rosenthal and Bill Blush began performing together in 1995 in Strings & Stories (Blush tells stories accompanied by Rosenthal's music), a program commissioned by Education at the Kennedy Center in Washington, D.C. She has been recognized for her contributions to music in Alaska with honors from the Mayor's Award for Lifetime Achievement in the Arts, Juneau Arts & Humanities Council, the governor, the state legislature, and the University of Alaska Southeast.
