= Juneau, Alaska =

Capital of Alaska, United States

Juneau Dzántik'i Héeni (Tlingit)
- Consolidated city-borough
- City and Borough of Juneau
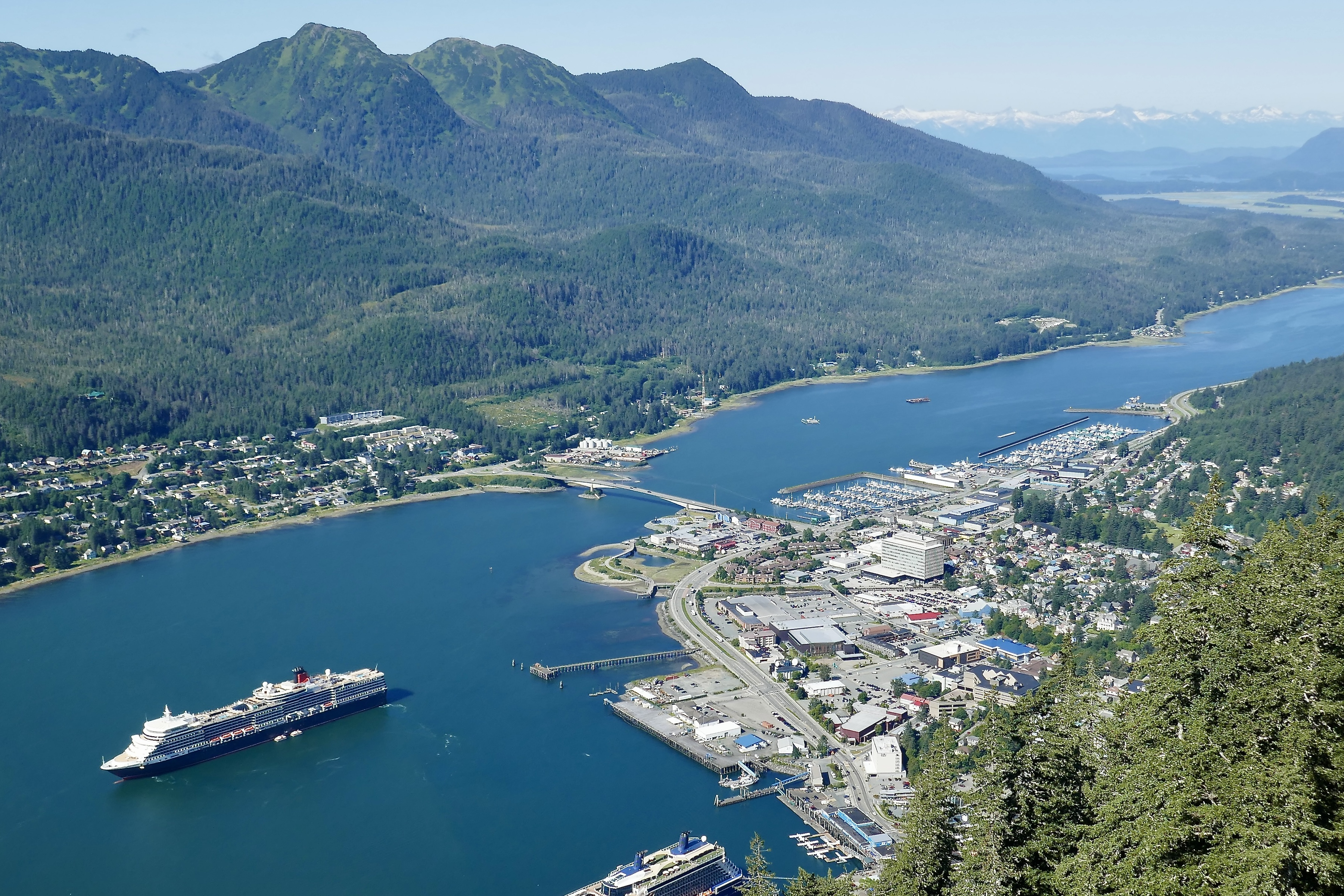
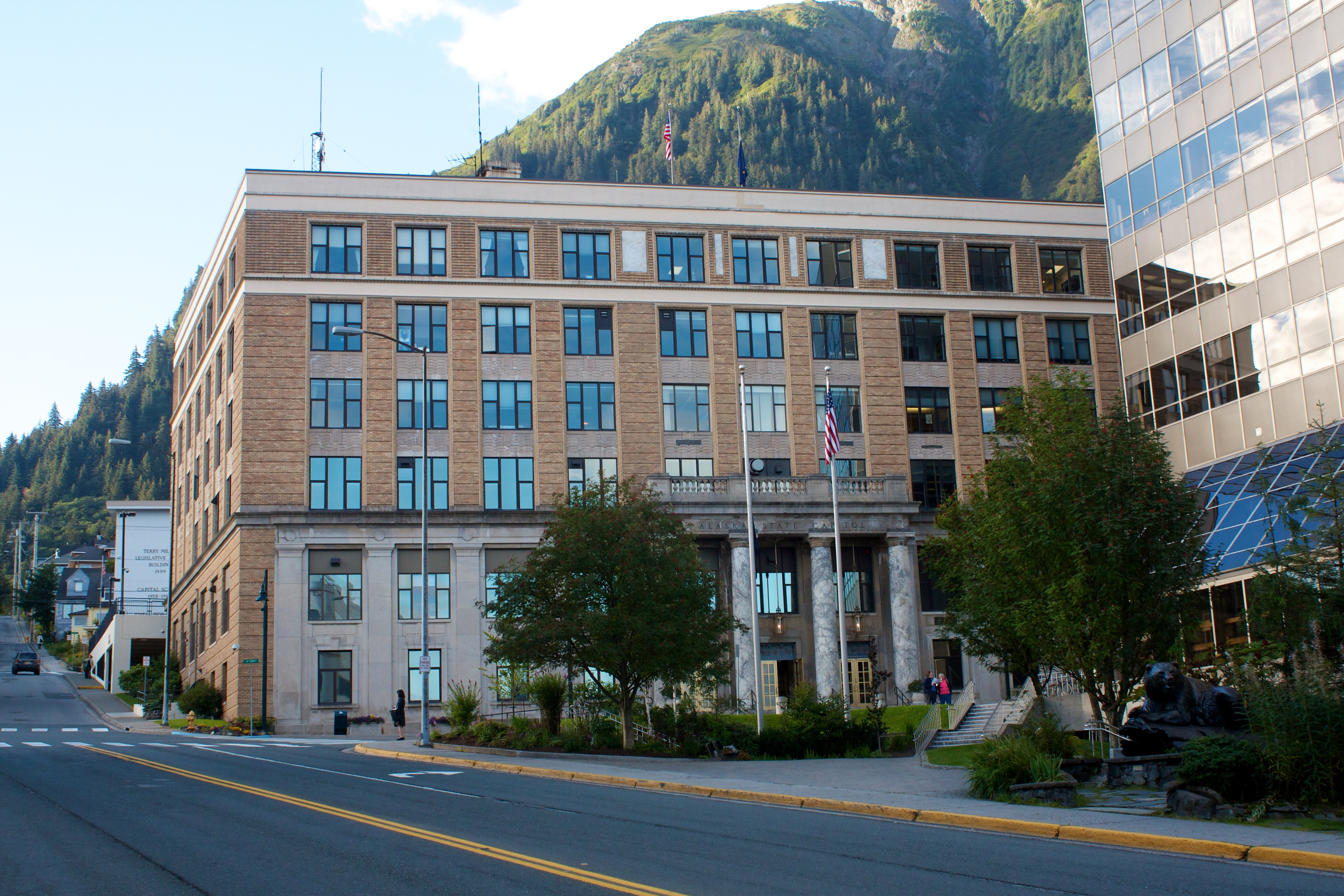
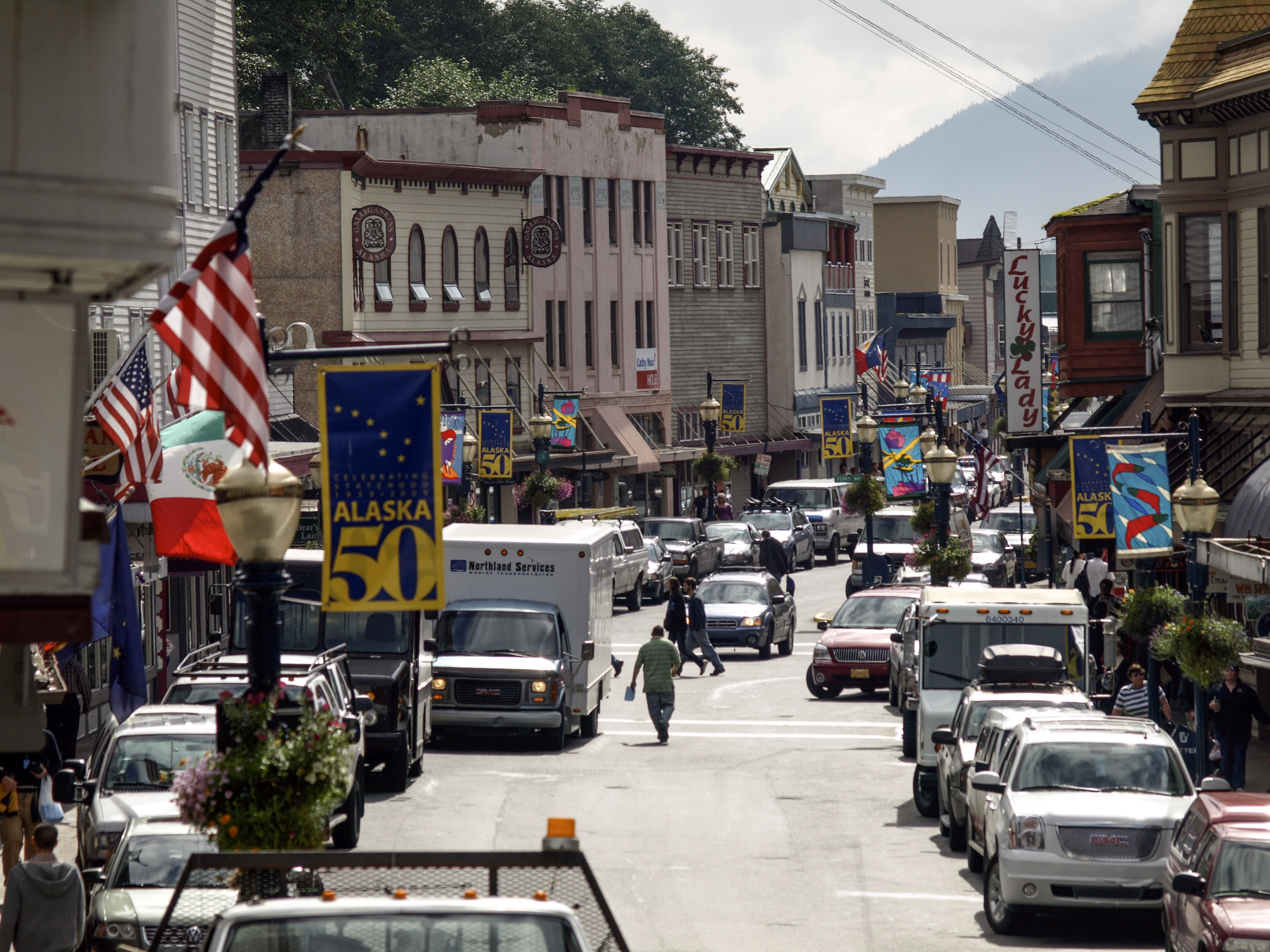
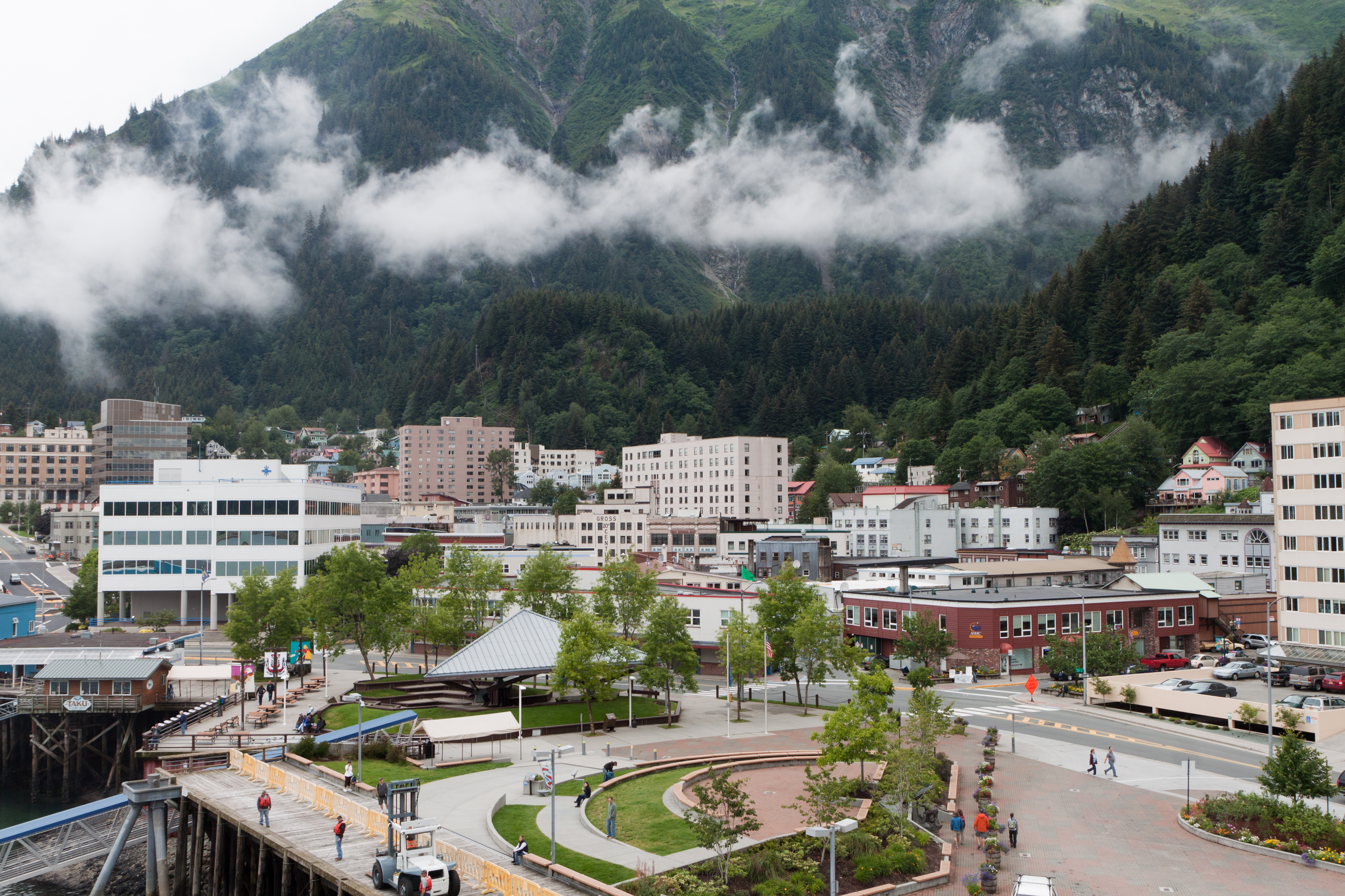
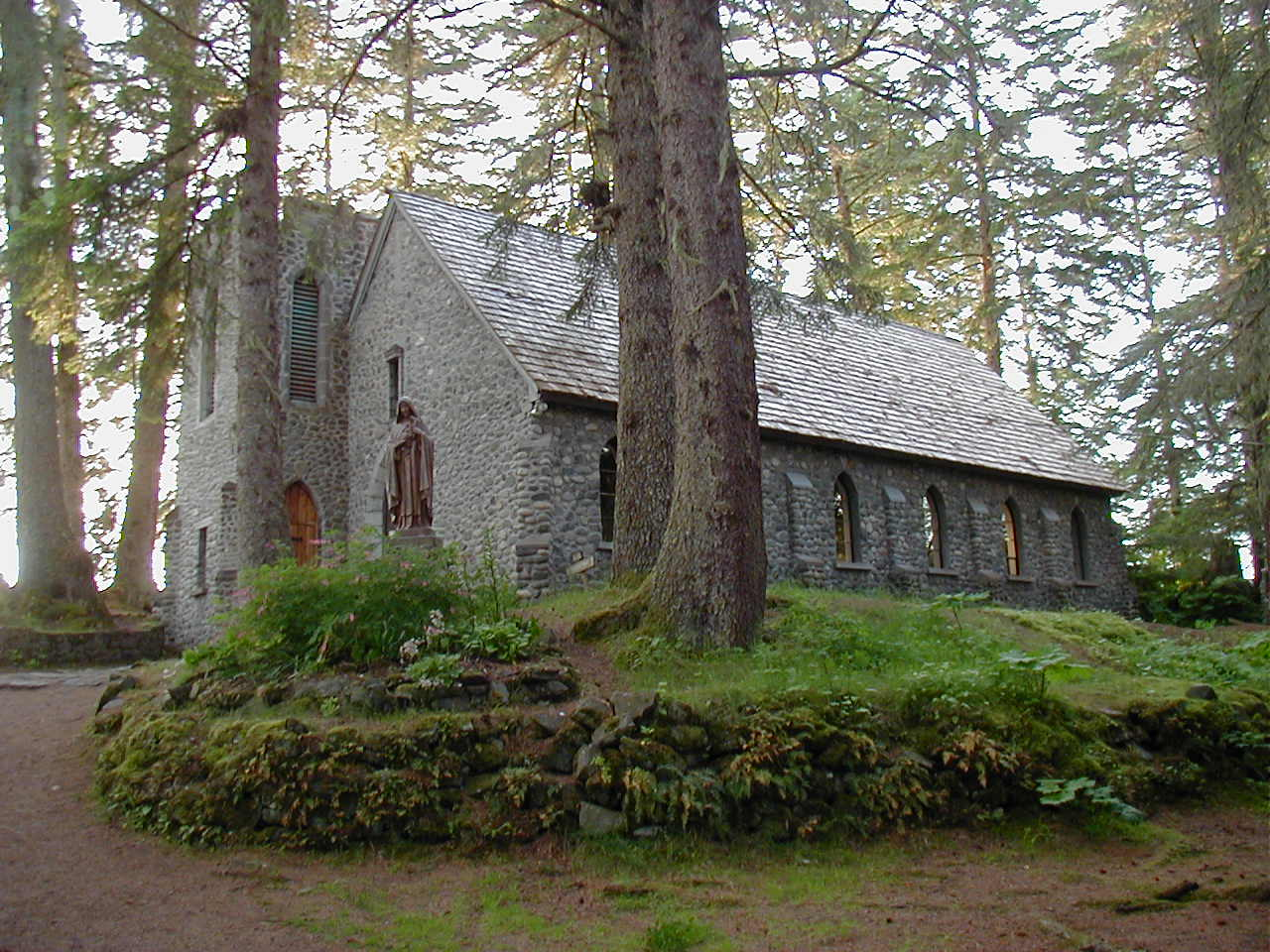
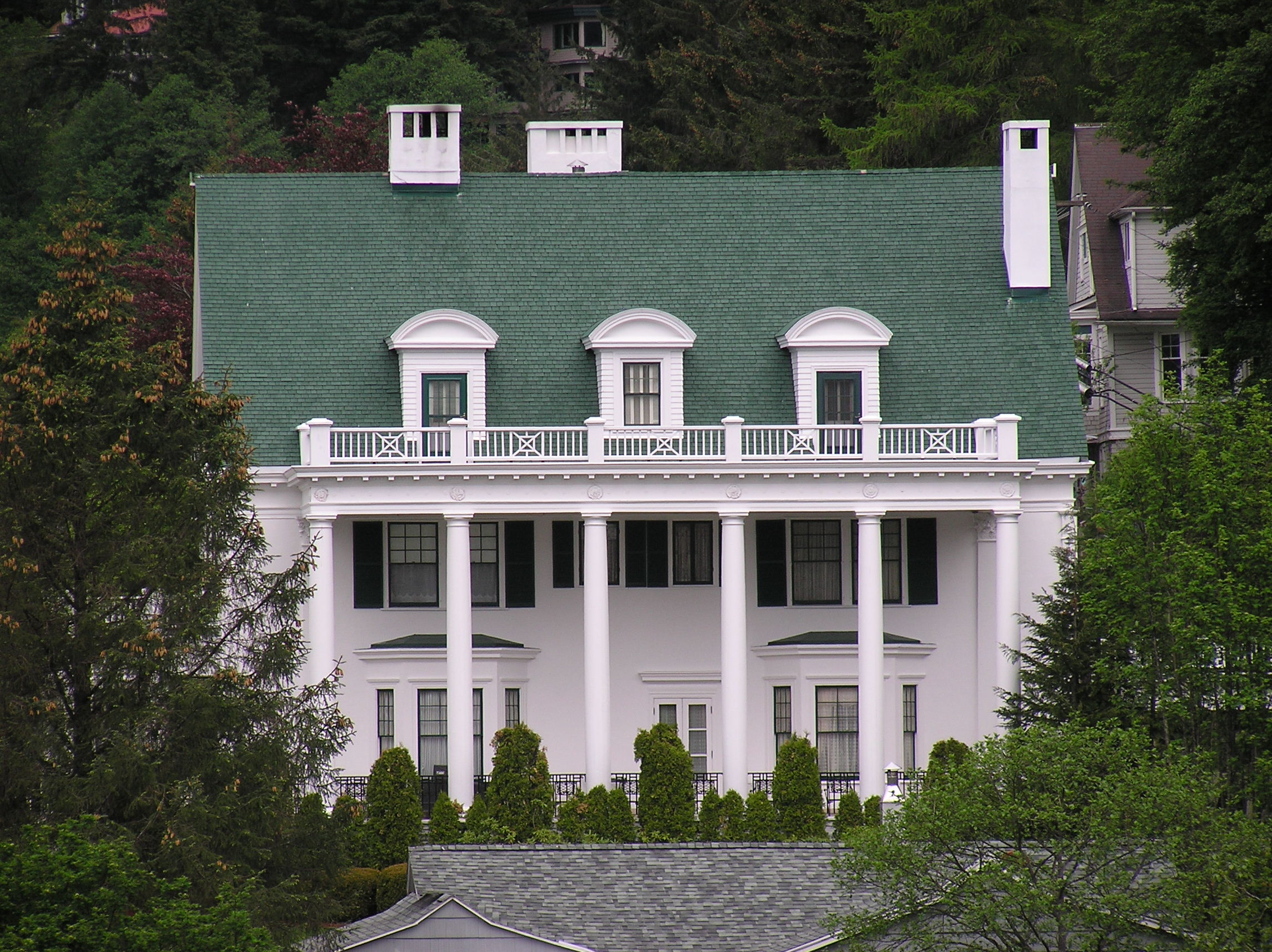
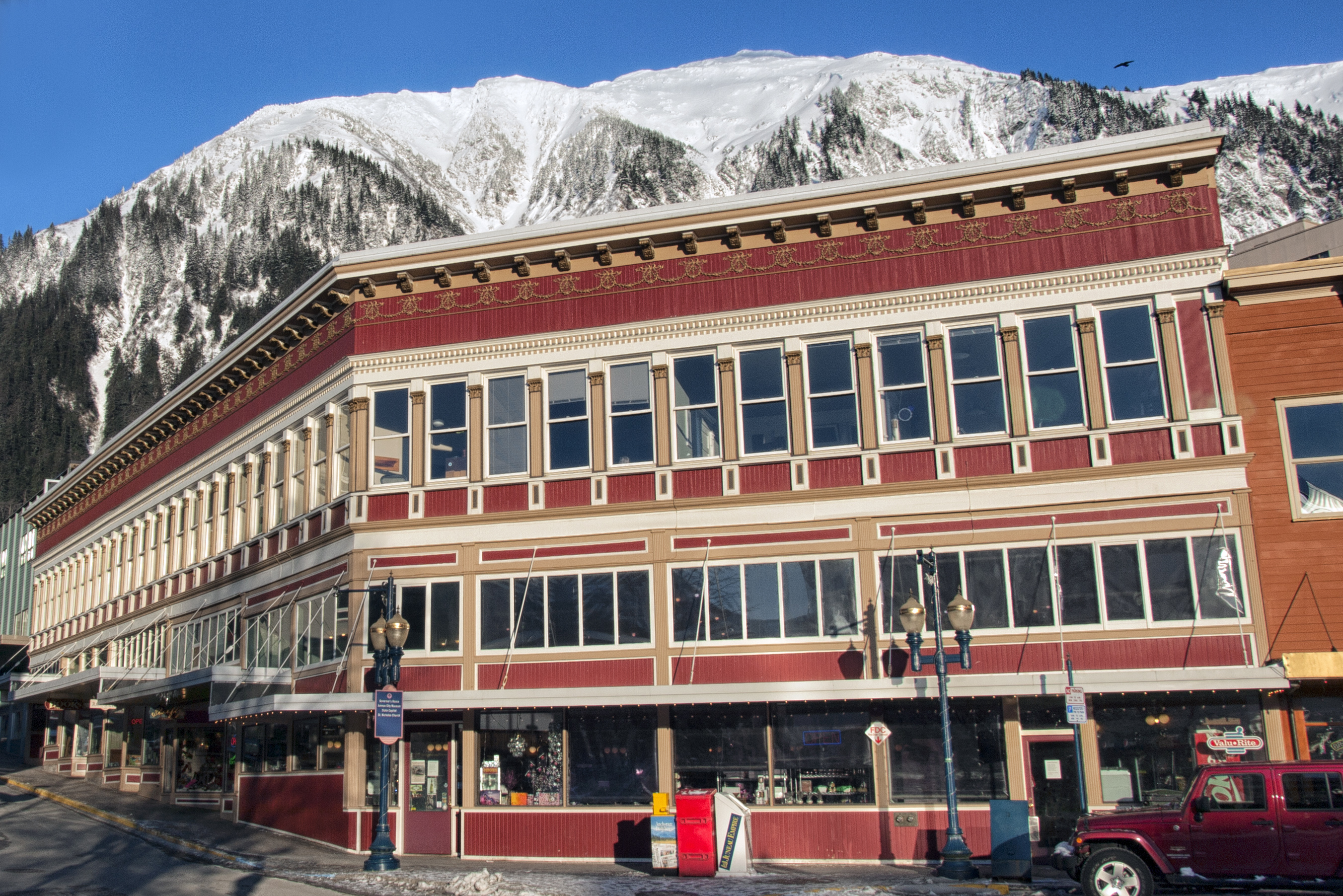
- View of Juneau from the Goldbelt Tram. The Juneau–Douglas Bridge spans the Gastineau Channel. Alaska State Capitol South Franklin Street Downtown with Mount Juneau in the background National Shrine of St. Thérèse Alaska Governor's Mansion Valentine Building

- Flag Seal Logo
- Interactive map of Juneau
- Coordinates: 58°18′00″N 134°24′58″W
- Country: USA
- State: Alaska
- Named: 1881 (Juneau City); 1882 (Juneau)
- Incorporated: 1900
- Home-rule city: October 1960
- Borough: September 30, 1963 (Greater Juneau Borough); July 1, 1970 (City and Borough of Juneau)
- Founder: Richard Harris and Joe Juneau
- Named for: Joe Juneau

Government
  - Mayor: Beth Weldon
  - Governing body: Assembly
  - State senator: Jesse Kiehl (D)
  - State reps.: Sara Hannan (D); Andi Story (D)

Area
  - Consolidated city-borough: 3,254.70 sq mi (8,429.64 km^{2})
  - Land: 2,704.03 sq mi (7,003.41 km^{2})
  - Water: 550.67 sq mi (1,426.23 km^{2})
  - Urban: 14.0 sq mi (36 km^{2})
- Elevation: 33 ft (10 m)

Population (2020)
  - Consolidated city-borough: 32,255
  - Estimate (2025): 31,609 ▼
  - Density: 11.928/sq mi (4.6056/km^{2})
- Demonym: Juneauite

GDP
  - State capital: $2.4 billion (2022)
- Time zone: UTC−9 (AKST)
  - Summer (DST): UTC−8 (AKDT)
- ZIP Codes: 99801–99803, 99811–99812, 99821, 99824
- Area code: 907
- FIPS code: 02-36400
- GNIS feature ID: 1404263
- Website: juneau.org

Juneau (/ˈdʒuːnoʊ/ JOO-noh; Tlingit: Dzántik'i Héeni [ˈtsʌ́ntʰɪ̀kʼɪ̀ ˈhíːnɪ̀] transl. Base of the Flounder's River), officially the City and Borough of Juneau, is the capital of the U.S. state of Alaska, located along the Gastineau Channel in Southeast Alaska. Juneau was named the capital of Alaska in 1906, when the government of what was then the District of Alaska was moved from Sitka as dictated by the U.S. Congress in 1900. On July 1, 1970, the City of Juneau merged with the City of Douglas and the surrounding Greater Juneau Borough to form the current consolidated city-borough, which ranks as the second-largest municipality in the United States by area and is larger than both Rhode Island and Delaware.

Downtown Juneau is nestled at the base of Mount Juneau and it is across the channel from Douglas Island. As of the 2025 census, the City and Borough had a population of 31,454, making it the third-most populous city in Alaska after Anchorage and Fairbanks, but the sixth-least populous U.S. state capital. Juneau experiences a daily influx of 16,000 people or more from visiting cruise ships between the months of May and September. These cruise ships have a positive impact on Juneau's local economy, bringing in $375 million of direct spending in 2023. The city is named after a gold prospector from Quebec, Joe Juneau, although it was once called Rockwell and then Harrisburg (after Juneau's co-prospector, Richard Harris). The Tlingit name of the town is Dzántik'i Héeni (transl. Base of the Flounder's River), and Auke Bay just north of Juneau proper is called Áak'w (transl. Little Lake) in Tlingit. The Taku River, just south of Juneau, was named after the cold t'aakh wind, which occasionally blows down from the mountains.

Juneau is the only U.S. state capital on the North American mainland without road access to the rest of the continent. The absence of a road network is due to the extremely rugged terrain surrounding the city. In turn, Juneau is a de facto island city in terms of transportation; all goods coming in and out must be transported by plane or boat despite the city's location on the Alaskan mainland. Downtown Juneau sits at sea level with tides averaging 16 feet (5 m), below steep mountains about 3,500 to 4,000 feet (1,100 to 1,200 m) high. Atop the mountains is the Juneau Icefield, a large ice mass from which about 30 glaciers flow; two of them, the Mendenhall Glacier and the Lemon Creek Glacier, are visible from the local road system. The Mendenhall Glacier has been gradually retreating; its front face is declining in width and height.

The Alaska State Capitol in downtown Juneau was built as the Federal and Territorial Building in 1931. Prior to statehood, it housed federal government offices, the federal courthouse, and a post office. It also housed the territorial legislature and other territorial offices, including that of the governor. Juneau is the home of the state legislature, the governor, and lieutenant governor. Some executive branch offices have moved certain functions to Anchorage and elsewhere in the state.

== History ==
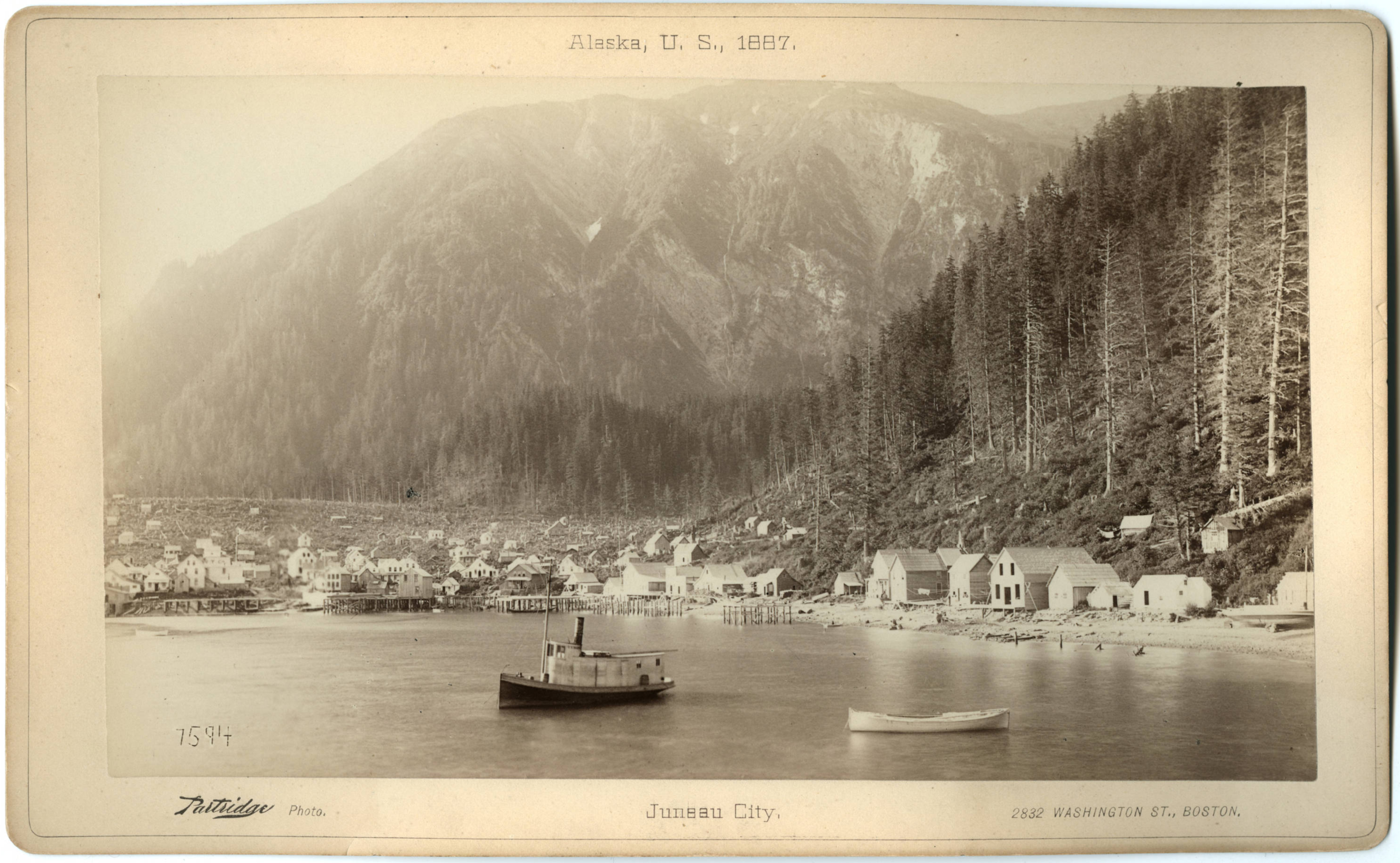
The city of Juneau in 1887

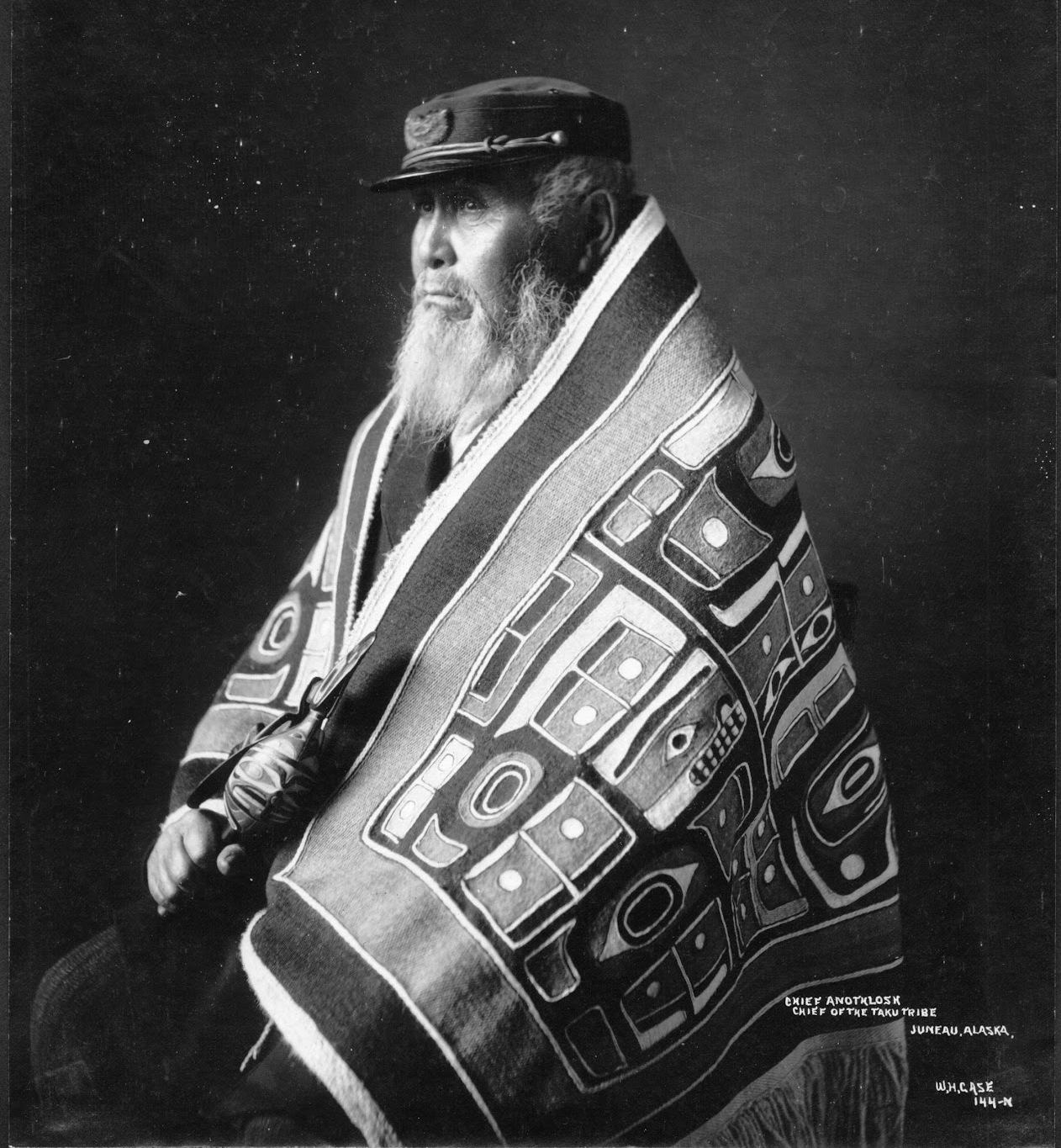
Chief Anotklosh of the Taku tribe, circa 1913

The Gastineau Channel was a fishing place for the Auke (A'akw Kwáan) and Taku tribes, who had inhabited the surrounding area for thousands of years. The A'akw Kwáan had a village and a burying ground here. In the 21st century, it is known as Indian Point. They annually harvested herring during the spawning season.

Since the late 20th century, the A'akw Kwáan, together with the Sealaska Heritage Institute, have resisted European-American development of Indian Point, including proposals by the National Park Service and the National Oceanic and Atmospheric Administration (NOAA). They consider it to be sacred territory, both because of the burying ground and the importance of the point in their traditions of gathering sustenance from the sea. They continue to gather clams, gumboot chitons, grass, and sea urchins, as well as tree bark for medicinal uses.

The city and state supported the Sealaska Heritage Institute in documenting the 78 acres (32 ha) site, and in August 2016, it was listed on the National Register of Historic Places. "It is the first traditional cultural property in Southeast Alaska to be placed on the register." Descendants of the indigenous people include the Tlingit. Native cultures have rich artistic traditions expressed in carving, weaving, singing, dancing, and through oral lore. Juneau is a social center for the Tlingit, Haida, and Tsimshian of Southeast Alaska.

=== European encounters ===
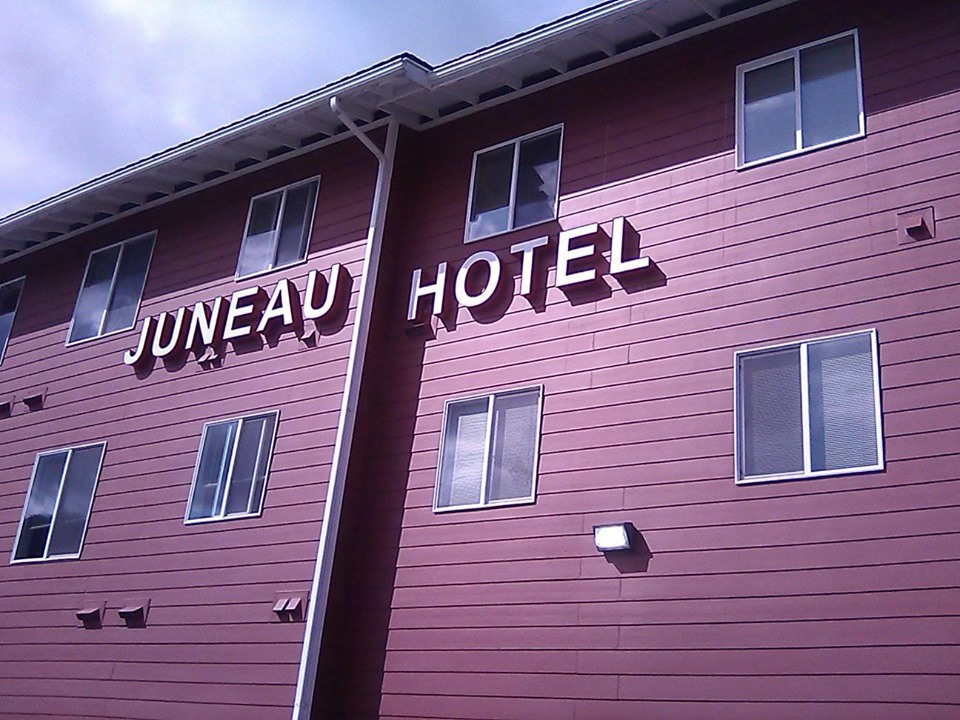
The Juneau Hotel near the Juneau–Douglas Bridge

Although the Russians had a colony in the Alaska territory from 1784 to 1867, they did not settle in Juneau. They conducted extensive fur trading with Alaskan Natives of the Aleutian Islands and Kodiak.

The first European to see the Juneau area was Joseph Whidbey, master of the Discovery during George Vancouver's 1791–95 expedition. He and his party explored the region in July–August 1794. Early in August he viewed the length of Gastineau Channel from the south, noting a small island in mid-channel. He later recorded seeing the channel again, this time from the west. He said it was unnavigable, being filled with ice.

=== Mining era and naming ===
After the California gold rush, miners migrated up the Pacific Coast and explored the West, seeking other gold deposits. In 1880, Sitka mining engineer George Pilz offered a reward to any local native in Alaska who could lead him to gold-bearing ore. A local native arrived with some ore, and several prospectors were sent to investigate. On their first trip to Gold Creek, they found deposits of little interest. However, Pilz sent Joe Juneau (the cousin of Milwaukee co-founder Solomon Juneau) and Richard Harris back to the Gastineau Channel, directing them to go to Snow Slide Gulch (the head of Gold Creek). According to the Rev. Samuel Young, in his book Alaska Days with John Muir, Juneau and Harris decided to explore their party's campsite at the creek head in the summer of 1879. They found nuggets "as large as peas and beans" there, in Harris' words.

On October 18, 1880, the two men marked a 160-acre (650,000 m^{2}) town site and soon a mining camp sprang up. Many miners arrived within a year and the camp became a village, albeit made up mostly of tents and shacks rather than buildings. It was the first European American settlement founded in the territory after the United States purchased Alaska. By the autumn of 1881, the village had a population of over 100 and was known as Rockwell, after Lt. Com. Charles Rockwell; later it was known as Harrisburg after prospector Richard Harris. On December 14, 1881, it was decided at a miners' meeting of 72 persons to name the settlement Juneau, after prospector Joe Juneau.

=== Establishment of Russian Orthodox Church ===
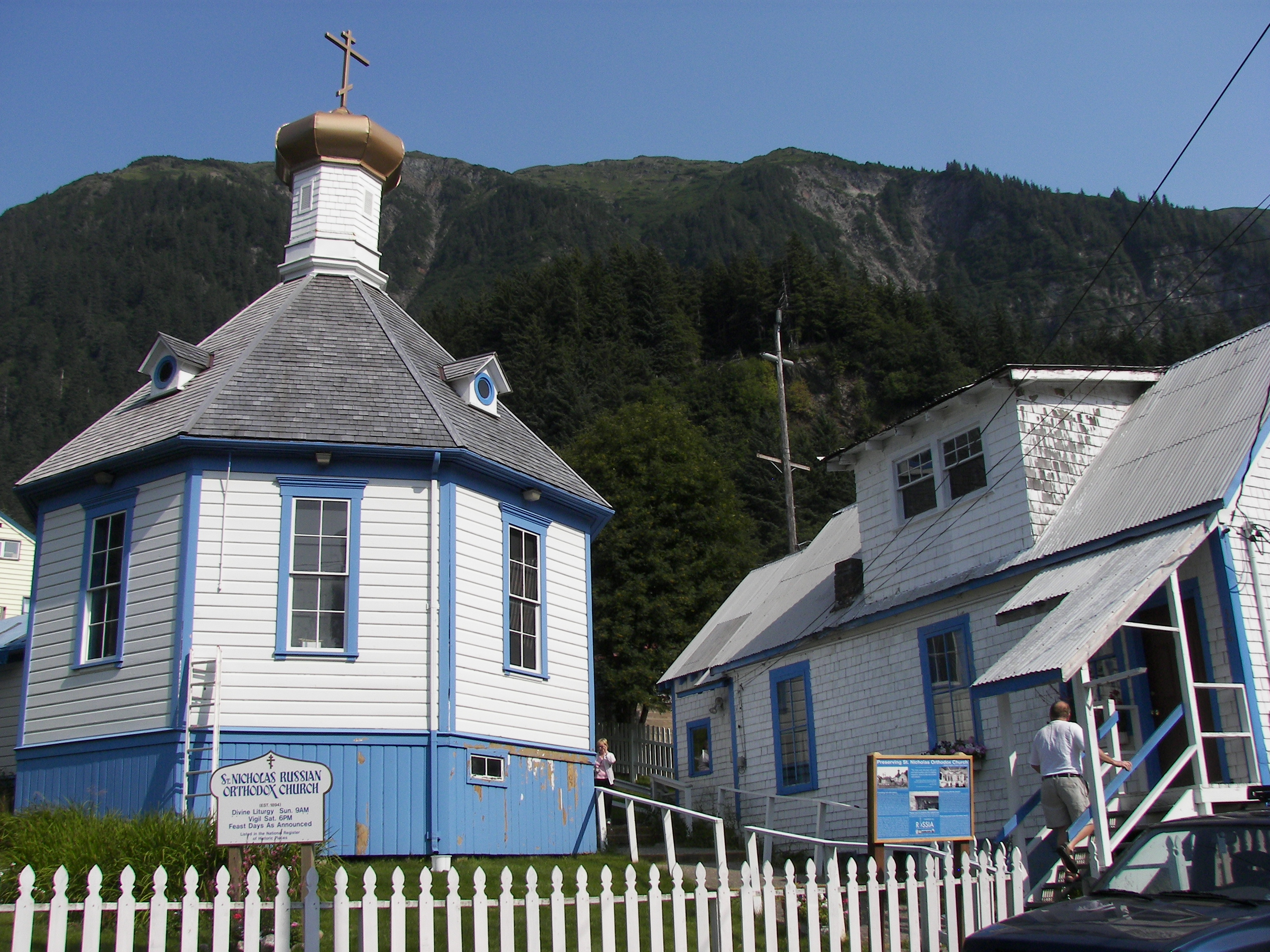
St. Nicholas Russian Orthodox Church, built in 1894 by Tlingit and Serbians in Juneau

Likely due to the pressure of European encroachment, some Tlingit appealed to the Russian Orthodox Church. It held services in northern Tlingit settlements in local languages as early as 1800 and 1824. One of its priests translated scripture and liturgy into the Tlingit language during the 1830s and 1840s. The Tlingit arranged for an Orthodox priest to come to their Juneau settlement. In 1890, about 700 people converted after chief Yees Gaanaalx and his wife of Auke Bay joined the church. The Orthodox Church Missionary Society supported the Tlingit in furnishing and constructing a church for the large congregation.

The St. Nicholas Russian Orthodox Church was completed in 1894 and has maintained an important presence among the Tlingit, Serbians, and other Europeans who follow Orthodox traditions. The iconostasis has six large panels which were sent from Russia.

=== Development of mining ===
Prospector and placer miner John Lemon operated at the time in what is today the Lemon Creek area. The neighborhood which developed there was given his name by early settlers. Several other landmarks in Juneau have also been named for him. Major mining operations in the Juneau mining district prior to World War II included the Treadwell Mine, the Alaska-Juneau Mine, and the Alaska-Gastineau Mine.

By 1906, after the decline of whaling and the fur trade, Sitka which was the original capital of Alaska, had become less important and the territorial legislature moved the seat of government to Juneau in accordance with a 1900 federal law. Juneau was the most populous city in Alaska during the inter-war years, surpassing Fairbanks population by the 1920 census. Anchorage became the largest city in terms of population in 1950.

=== Selection as capital ===
In 1911, the United States Congress authorized funds for construction of a capitol building for the District of Alaska. World War I delayed construction and there were difficulties purchasing the necessary land. Citizens of Juneau donated some of the required funds, and construction began on September 8, 1929. Construction of the capitol took less than two years, and the building was dedicated as the Federal and Territorial Building on February 14, 1931. It was designed by Treasury Department architects in the Art Deco architectural style. The building was originally used by the federal government to house the federal courthouse and the post office for the territory. Alaska gained statehood in 1959 and under the Alaska Statehood Act, the Federal and Territorial Building was transferred to the new state and became its capitol.

The Alaska Governor's Mansion was commissioned under the Public Building Act in 1910. The mansion was designed by James Knox Taylor in the Colonial Revival style. Construction was completed in 1912. The territorial governor at the time was the first governor to live in the mansion, and he held the first open house for citizens on January 1, 1913. The mansion is 14,400 square feet (1,340 m^{2}). It has ten bathrooms, six bedrooms, and eight fireplaces. It is the governor's residence when in Juneau on official business. In June 1923, President Warren G. Harding became the first president to visit Alaska. He visited the Governor's Mansion while Territorial Governor Scott Bone, who was appointed by Harding, was in office. Harding spoke about his policies from the porch of the mansion and met with attendees

During World War II, more than 50 Japanese citizens and Japanese Americans residing in Juneau were sent to the internment camps inland as a result of Executive Order 9066, which authorized the forced removal of all ethnic Japanese away from their homes and businesses on the West Coast of the United States. The removal of Juneau's Japanese community during the war is memorialized by the Empty Chair Memorial, which was dedicated in July 2014 in the city's Capital School Park neighborhood.

Robert Atwood, who was then the publisher of the Anchorage Times and an Anchorage "booster", was an early leader in efforts to move the capital to Fairbanks, which many in both cities resisted. Some supporters of a move wanted a new capital to be at least 30 miles (48 km) away from Anchorage and Fairbanks, to prevent either city from having undue influence. Juneau has continued as the capital. In the 1970s, voters passed a plan to move the capital to Willow, a town 70 miles (110 km) north of Anchorage. But pro-Juneau people there and in Fairbanks persuaded voters also to approve a measure (the FRANK Initiative) requiring voter approval of all bondable construction costs before building could begin. Alaskans later voted against spending the estimated $900 million. A 1984 "ultimate" capital-move vote also failed, as did a 1996 vote.

After Alaska achieved statehood in 1959, Juneau's population increased as well as the growth of state government. After construction of the Alaska Pipeline in 1977, the state budget was flush with oil revenues, and it expanded state spending programs. The population growth in Juneau slowed considerably after 1990.

Memorial to the founders of the city, Richard Harris and Joe Juneau

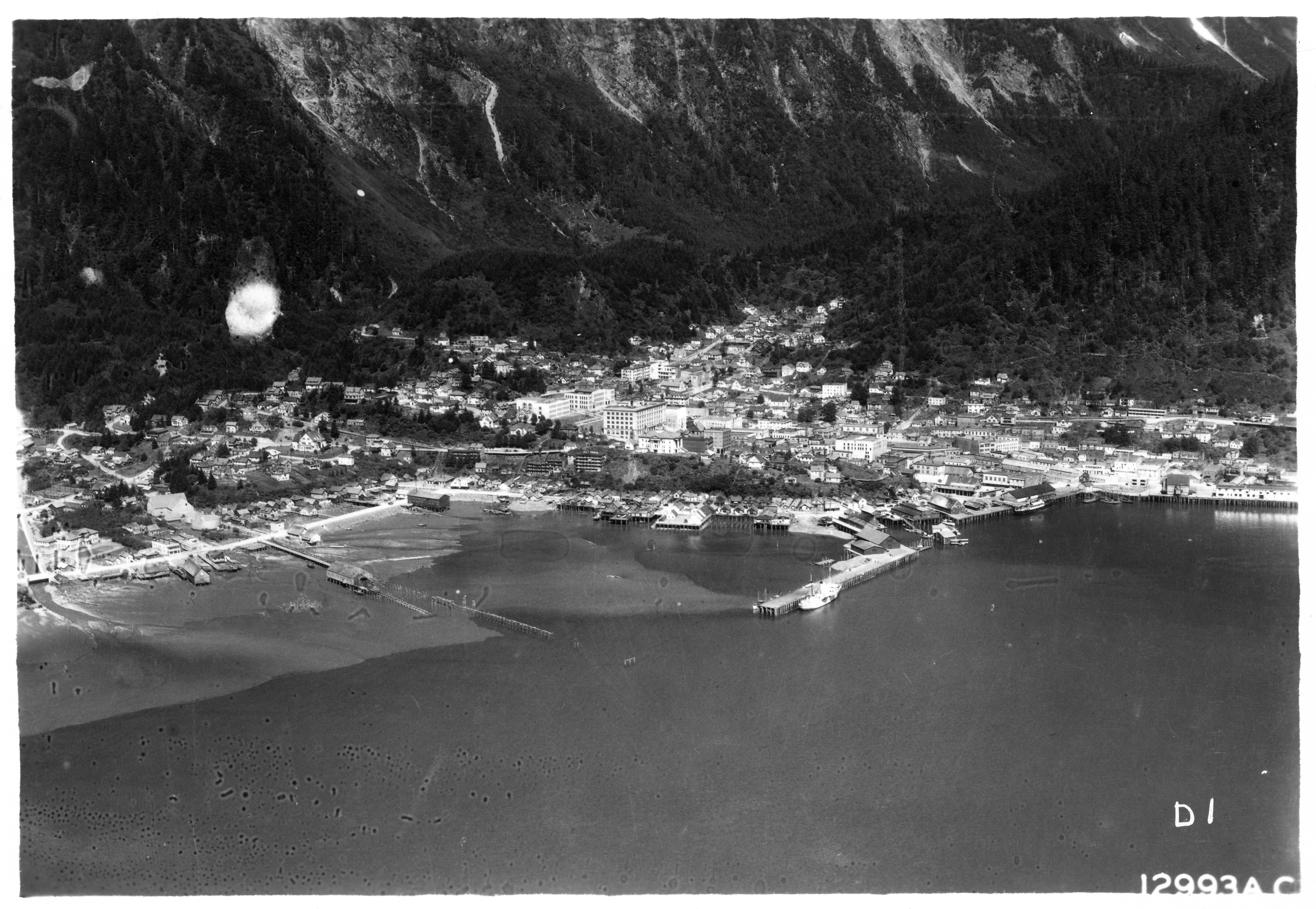
View of Juneau, 1940s

=== 21st century ===
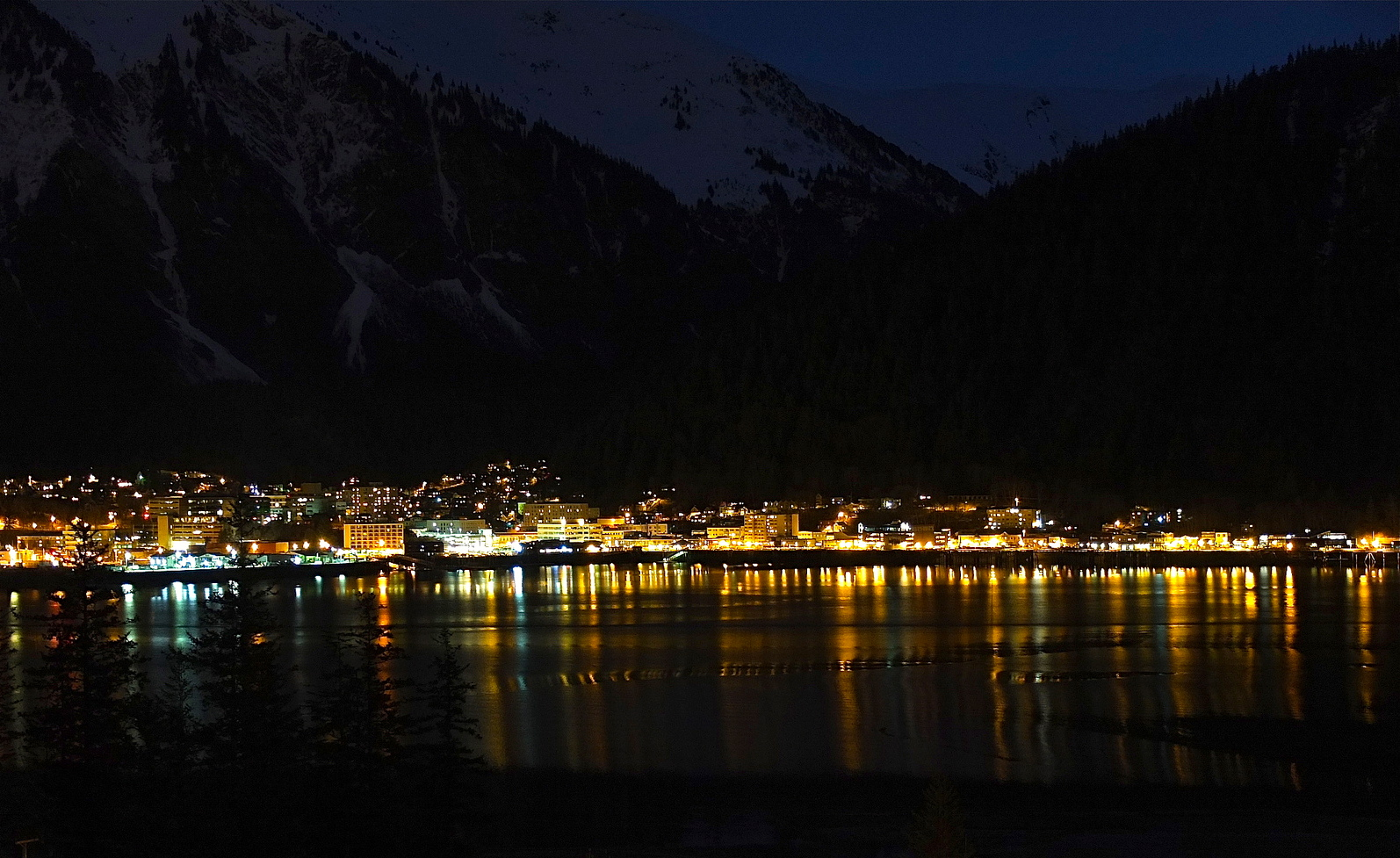
Downtown Juneau at night

In 2005, the state demographer projected slow growth in the borough for the next twenty years. Cruise ship tourism has expanded rapidly, from approximately 230,000 passengers in 1990 to nearly 1,700,000 in 2025, as cruise lines have built more and larger ships. They sail to Juneau seven days a week over a longer season than before, but the cruising tourism is still primarily a summer industry. It provides few year-round jobs but stimulates summer employment in the city. In 2010, the city was recognized as part of the "Playful City USA" initiative by KaBOOM!, created to honor cities that ensure their children have great places to play.

The city was temporarily renamed UNO, after the card game, on April 1, 2016 (April Fool's Day). The event was a promotion with Mattel to draw "attention to new wild cards in [the] game". For Juneau's cooperation, Mattel donated $15,000 "to the Juneau Community Foundation in honor of the late Mayor Greg Fisk."

== Geography ==
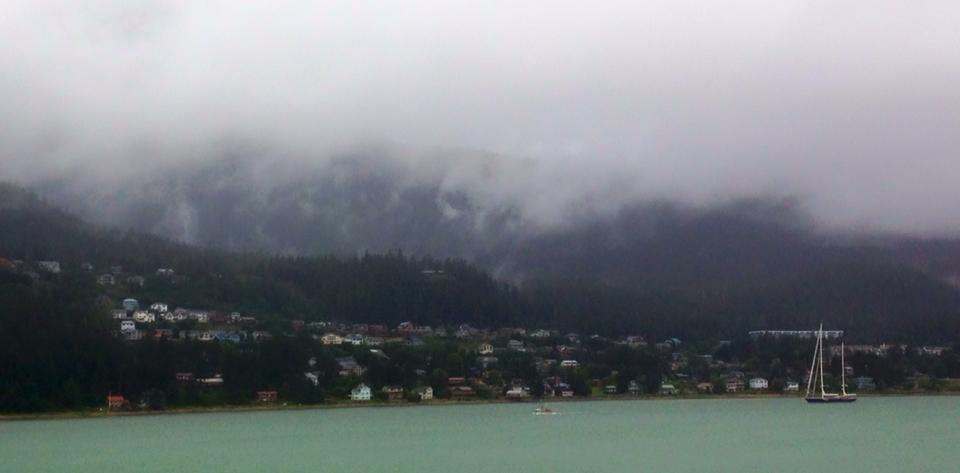
A view of Douglas Island from mainland Juneau. The Juneau-Douglas Bridge connects the island to the mainland.

According to the United States Census Bureau, the borough has an area of 3,255 square miles (8,430 km^{2}). In land area, Juneau (proper) is the largest state capital and the second-largest city overall in the United States, with 2,716.7 square miles (7,036 km^{2}) being made up of land and 538.3 square miles (1,394 km^{2}) consisting of water (16.54%).

The central (downtown) area of Juneau is at 58°18′00″N 134°24′58″W. The City and Borough of Juneau includes Douglas Island, which is a tidal island to the west of mainland Juneau. Douglas can be reached via the Juneau-Douglas Bridge. An unpopulated section of the city is located on Admiralty Island near its northern end.

As in the rest of Southeast Alaska, the Juneau area is susceptible to damage caused by natural disasters. The 2014 Palma Bay earthquake caused widespread outages to telecommunications in the area due to damage to a fiber-optic cable serving the area. In April 2008, a series of massive avalanches outside Juneau heavily damaged the electrical lines providing Juneau with power, knocking the hydroelectric system offline and forcing the utility to switch to a much more expensive diesel system.

The community is impacted by annual glacial outburst flooding (jökulhlaup) from Suicide Basin/Kʼóox Ḵaadí Basin above the Mendenhall Glacier. The 2024 event was declared a disaster by the State of Alaska and the Federal Government, and caused damages estimated between $2.8 and $5.6 million. Prior to the 2025 event, the City in partnership with the United States Army Corps of Engineers and informed by research, models and forecasting from the Alaska Climate Adaptation Science Center, the University of Alaska Southeast, the National Weather Service and the United States Geological Survey, installed a temporary levee system along the Mendenhall River utilizing HESCO barriers to minimize the impact of future flood events. The levee was expanded prior to the 2026 event. In August 2025, the City and Borough of Juneau (CBJ) and the Central Council of the Tlingit & Haida Indian Tribes of Alaska issued coordinated emergency disaster declarations in anticipation of a record-level flood. Despite record-breaking flood levels in 2025, property and other damages were minimal due to the levee system. As of summer 2026, the Army Corps of Engineers is soliciting proposals for a long term engineering solution utilizing a lake tap system. The Thirty-Fourth Alaska State Legislature recognized research collaborators Jamie Pierce (USGS), Aaron Jacobs (NWS), Dr. Eran Hood, and Dr. Jason Amundson (UAS) for their leadership and public service in response to the glacial outburst flooding events.

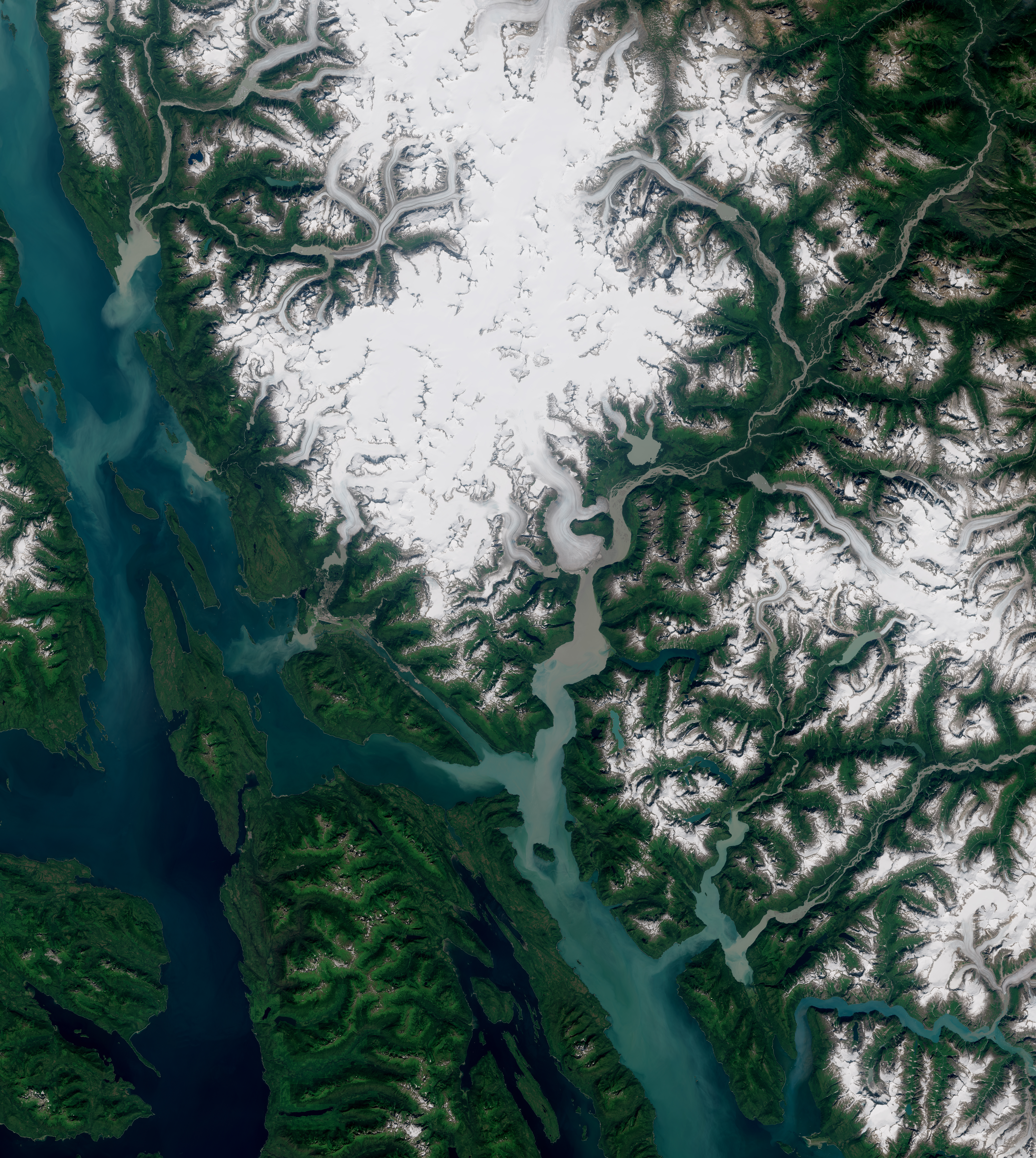
Satellite image shows all of Juneau

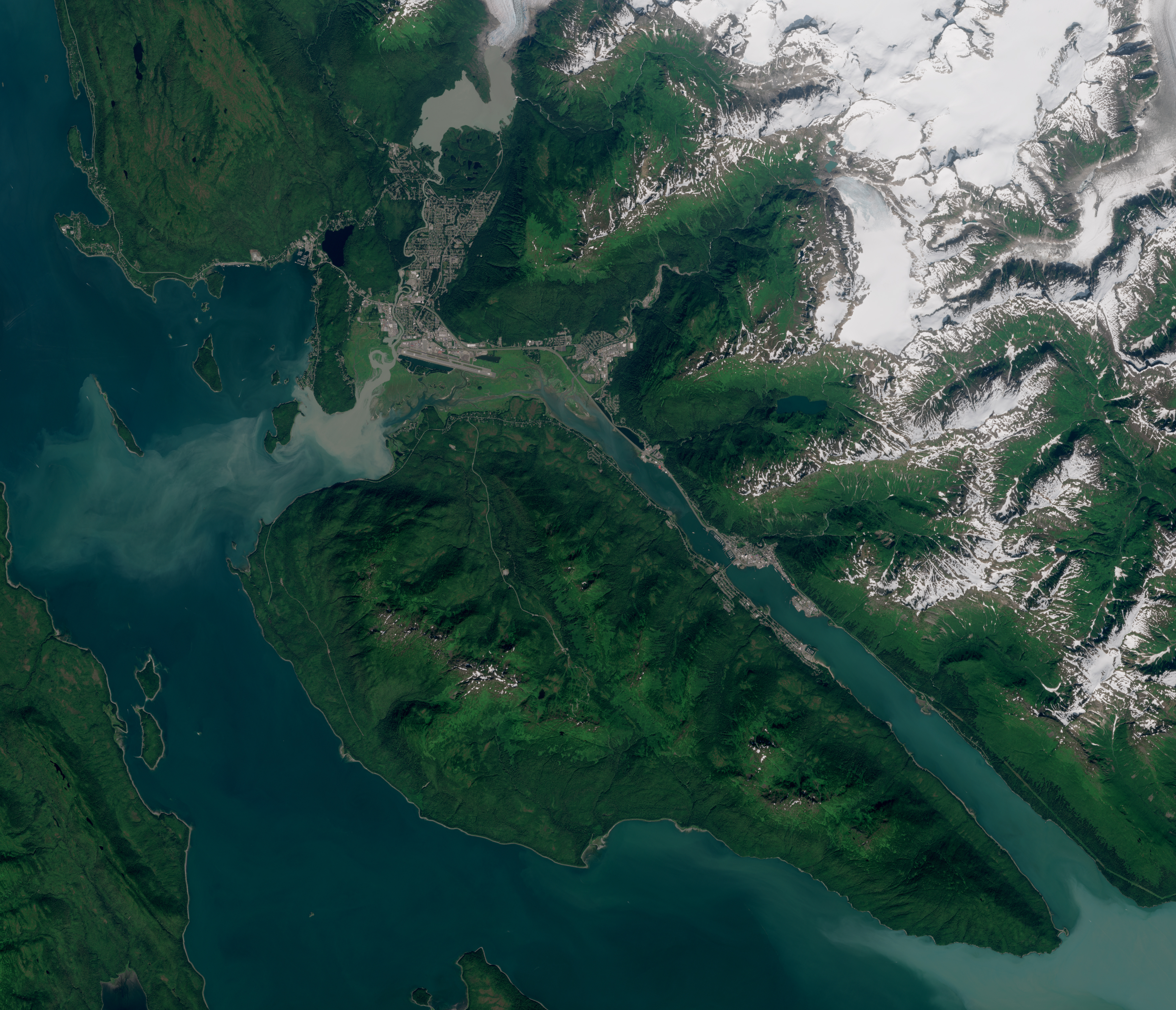
Core area of Juneau including Douglas Island from satellite image above

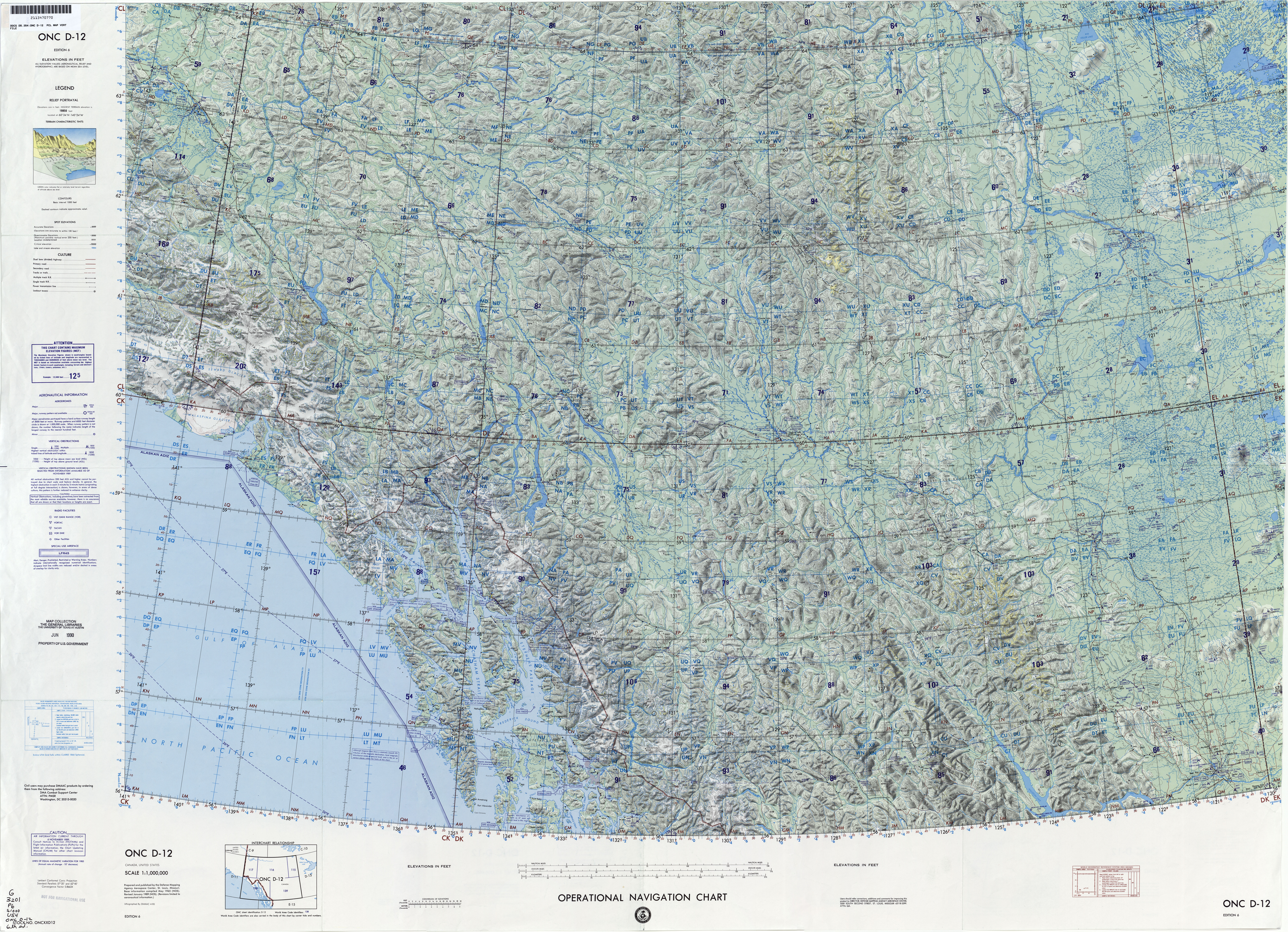
Map including Juneau

=== Adjacent boroughs and census areas ===
- Haines Borough, Alaska – northwest, west
- Hoonah-Angoon Census Area, Alaska – south, southwest
- Petersburg Borough, Alaska – quadripoint

=== Border area ===
Juneau shares its eastern border with the Canadian province of British Columbia. It is the only U.S. state capital which borders another country.

- Stikine Region, British Columbia – northeast, east

=== National protected areas ===
- Tongass National Forest (part)
  - Admiralty Island National Monument (part)
    - Kootznoowoo Wilderness (part)
  - Tracy Arm-Fords Terror Wilderness (part)

=== State parks ===
Alaska State Parks maintains the Juneau Trail System, a series of wilderness trails which vary from easy to extremely difficult to hike.

=== Climate ===
Climate chart for Juneau

The Juneau area is in a transition zone between a humid continental climate (Köppen Dfb), a subarctic climate (Köppen Dfc), and an oceanic climate (Köppen Cfb/Cfc), depending on the isotherm used. The city's climate is heavily influenced by the proximity of the Pacific Ocean, specifically the warm Alaska Current, and the Coast Mountains that form a natural orographic barrier for incoming air. As a result, the weather is mild and moist, which, as in other parts of the Alaska Panhandle, allows the growth of temperate rainforests. Like other cities in southeast Alaska, Juneau does not have permafrost. As of 2023, Juneau falls within USDA Hardiness Zones 6B and 7A.

There are two prevalent types of wind in Juneau. Particularly in winter, the Aleutian Low draws warm and moist air from the south, bringing ample snow- or rainfall, and even in summer, winds will tend to blow onshore. The strength and frequency of the rainfall depends on several factors, including the presence of El Niño (more mild and rainy weather) or La Niña (colder and drier periods due to the presence of an anticyclone in the Gulf of Alaska). Conversely, offshore winds from the interior are normally dry but may have extreme variations in temperature.

Temperatures vary relatively little over the year. Winters are mild by Alaskan standards, with the average temperature of January slightly below freezing and highs often above 32 °F (0.0 °C); summers are rather cool but occasionally may get warm. Temperatures above 75 °F (23.9 °C) or below 10 °F (−12.2 °C) are not unheard of but are rare. Precipitation falls on an average 230 days per year, averaging 62.27 inches (1,580 mm) at the airport (1981–2010 normals), but ranging from 55 to 92 inches (1,400 to 2,340 mm), depending on location. Most of it will occur in fall and winter, some falling as snow from November to March.

Records have been officially kept at downtown Juneau from January 1890 to June 1943, and at Juneau International Airport since July 1943. The coldest temperature ever officially recorded in Juneau was −22 °F (−30.0 °C) on February 2, 1968, and January 12, 1972, while the hottest was 90 °F (32.2 °C) on July 7, 1975. The normals and record temperatures for both downtown and the airport are given below.

Climate data for Juneau, Alaska (Downtown, 1991–2020 normals, extremes 1890–present)
Month	Jan	Feb	Mar	Apr	May	Jun	Jul	Aug	Sep	Oct	Nov	Dec	Year
Record high °F (°C)	60 (16)	57 (14)	61 (16)	72 (22)	80 (27)	87 (31)	89 (32)	87 (31)	85 (29)	68 (20)	64 (18)	59 (15)	89 (32)
Mean maximum °F (°C)	46.6 (8.1)	48.2 (9.0)	49.2 (9.6)	60.1 (15.6)	72.4 (22.4)	78.1 (25.6)	77.6 (25.3)	76.4 (24.7)	67.0 (19.4)	57.3 (14.1)	49.6 (9.8)	47.2 (8.4)	81.1 (27.3)
Mean daily maximum °F (°C)	34.1 (1.2)	36.7 (2.6)	39.4 (4.1)	48.6 (9.2)	57.3 (14.1)	62.2 (16.8)	62.9 (17.2)	62.4 (16.9)	55.9 (13.3)	47.9 (8.8)	39.9 (4.4)	36.3 (2.4)	48.6 (9.2)
Daily mean °F (°C)	30.3 (−0.9)	32.2 (0.1)	34.5 (1.4)	42.2 (5.7)	50.2 (10.1)	55.6 (13.1)	57.3 (14.1)	56.7 (13.7)	51.1 (10.6)	43.7 (6.5)	36.0 (2.2)	32.5 (0.3)	43.5 (6.4)
Mean daily minimum °F (°C)	26.5 (−3.1)	27.7 (−2.4)	29.6 (−1.3)	35.8 (2.1)	43.1 (6.2)	49.0 (9.4)	51.8 (11.0)	51.0 (10.6)	46.3 (7.9)	39.4 (4.1)	32.1 (0.1)	28.7 (−1.8)	38.4 (3.6)
Mean minimum °F (°C)	10.3 (−12.1)	15.5 (−9.2)	17.4 (−8.1)	28.0 (−2.2)	35.3 (1.8)	42.3 (5.7)	47.0 (8.3)	45.0 (7.2)	39.0 (3.9)	29.8 (−1.2)	21.2 (−6.0)	15.7 (−9.1)	7.2 (−13.8)
Record low °F (°C)	−20 (−29)	−15 (−26)	−5 (−21)	12 (−11)	26 (−3)	32 (0)	39 (4)	32 (0)	28 (−2)	13 (−11)	−7 (−22)	−10 (−23)	−20 (−29)
Average precipitation inches (mm)	5.88 (149)	5.16 (131)	6.17 (157)	4.76 (121)	5.09 (129)	4.90 (124)	6.21 (158)	7.76 (197)	12.71 (323)	12.27 (312)	8.75 (222)	9.93 (252)	89.59 (2,276)
Average precipitation days (≥ 0.01 in)	16.9	18.8	19.6	19.3	17.8	16.9	17.0	20.3	24.0	22.6	22.5	19.4	235.1
Source: NOAA

Climate data for Juneau, Alaska (Juneau Int'l, 1991–2020 normals, extremes 1936–present)
Month	Jan	Feb	Mar	Apr	May	Jun	Jul	Aug	Sep	Oct	Nov	Dec	Year
Record high °F (°C)	60 (16)	57 (14)	61 (16)	74 (23)	82 (28)	86 (30)	90 (32)	85 (29)	78 (26)	63 (17)	56 (13)	54 (12)	90 (32)
Mean maximum °F (°C)	45.2 (7.3)	45.7 (7.6)	49.3 (9.6)	61.5 (16.4)	72.1 (22.3)	78.0 (25.6)	77.7 (25.4)	76.5 (24.7)	66.4 (19.1)	55.8 (13.2)	47.5 (8.6)	45.2 (7.3)	80.9 (27.2)
Mean daily maximum °F (°C)	33.1 (0.6)	35.7 (2.1)	39.2 (4.0)	48.7 (9.3)	57.6 (14.2)	62.4 (16.9)	64.0 (17.8)	62.9 (17.2)	56.1 (13.4)	47.3 (8.5)	38.3 (3.5)	34.7 (1.5)	48.3 (9.1)
Daily mean °F (°C)	28.5 (−1.9)	30.1 (−1.1)	32.9 (0.5)	40.8 (4.9)	49.0 (9.4)	54.6 (12.6)	57.0 (13.9)	56.0 (13.3)	50.1 (10.1)	42.2 (5.7)	33.8 (1.0)	30.3 (−0.9)	42.1 (5.6)
Mean daily minimum °F (°C)	23.8 (−4.6)	24.6 (−4.1)	26.6 (−3.0)	32.9 (0.5)	40.3 (4.6)	46.8 (8.2)	50.1 (10.1)	49.1 (9.5)	44.1 (6.7)	37.1 (2.8)	29.2 (−1.6)	25.9 (−3.4)	35.9 (2.2)
Mean minimum °F (°C)	6.0 (−14.4)	9.7 (−12.4)	12.2 (−11.0)	22.8 (−5.1)	31.3 (−0.4)	38.7 (3.7)	43.7 (6.5)	41.4 (5.2)	32.8 (0.4)	24.9 (−3.9)	14.6 (−9.7)	8.9 (−12.8)	−0.3 (−17.9)
Record low °F (°C)	−22 (−30)	−22 (−30)	−15 (−26)	6 (−14)	25 (−4)	31 (−1)	36 (2)	27 (−3)	23 (−5)	11 (−12)	−5 (−21)	−21 (−29)	−22 (−30)
Average precipitation inches (mm)	6.02 (153)	4.31 (109)	3.67 (93)	3.47 (88)	3.51 (89)	3.82 (97)	5.14 (131)	6.41 (163)	9.15 (232)	8.42 (214)	6.54 (166)	6.53 (166)	66.99 (1,702)
Average snowfall inches (cm)	24.5 (62)	16.7 (42)	12.4 (31)	1.2 (3.0)	0.0 (0.0)	0.0 (0.0)	0.0 (0.0)	0.0 (0.0)	0.0 (0.0)	0.9 (2.3)	13.8 (35)	18.1 (46)	87.6 (223)
Average extreme snow depth inches (cm)	12.1 (31)	9.9 (25)	7.5 (19)	1.0 (2.5)	0.0 (0.0)	0.0 (0.0)	0.0 (0.0)	0.0 (0.0)	0.0 (0.0)	0.5 (1.3)	6.2 (16)	8.9 (23)	17.3 (44)
Average precipitation days (≥ 0.01 in)	20.4	16.8	17.8	17.2	16.1	16.7	18.5	19.4	22.3	23.0	20.9	21.1	230.2
Average snowy days (≥ 0.1 in)	10.3	8.2	7.5	1.2	0.0	0.0	0.0	0.0	0.0	0.7	6.2	10.1	44.2
Average relative humidity (%)	79.9	80.8	79.4	76.8	76.3	78.3	81.3	84.3	87.9	87.7	85.1	82.8	81.7
Average dew point °F (°C)	18.0 (−7.8)	22.8 (−5.1)	26.2 (−3.2)	31.8 (−0.1)	38.8 (3.8)	45.5 (7.5)	49.5 (9.7)	49.5 (9.7)	45.3 (7.4)	38.5 (3.6)	28.2 (−2.1)	22.3 (−5.4)	34.7 (1.5)
Mean monthly sunshine hours	80.9	89.2	137.3	182.3	231.7	189.3	182.9	161.6	109.6	66.2	58.5	41.2	1,530.7
Percentage possible sunshine	36	34	37	42	44	35	34	34	28	21	25	20	34
Source: NOAA (relative humidity, dew point, and sun 1961–1990)

Climate data for Juneau, Alaska (Douglas, 1991–2020 normals)
Month	Jan	Feb	Mar	Apr	May	Jun	Jul	Aug	Sep	Oct	Nov	Dec	Year
Average precipitation inches (mm)	8.20 (208)	5.05 (128)	5.15 (131)	5.23 (133)	4.86 (123)	5.23 (133)	7.68 (195)	8.48 (215)	11.57 (294)	10.13 (257)	8.84 (225)	8.12 (206)	88.54 (2,249)
Average precipitation days (≥ 0.01 in)	21.8	17.8	15.6	20.1	15.9	20.1	19.5	20.7	22.6	22.8	21.7	24.2	242.8
Source: NOAA

Coastal temperature data for Juneau
Month	Jan	Feb	Mar	Apr	May	Jun	Jul	Aug	Sep	Oct	Nov	Dec	Year
Average sea temperature °F (°C)	40.6 (4.78)	40.5 (4.72)	39.9 (4.39)	40.8 (4.89)	43.5 (6.39)	47.1 (8.39)	50.4 (10.22)	53.2 (11.78)	50.5 (10.28)	46.6 (8.11)	44.6 (7.00)	43.0 (6.11)	45.1 (7.25)
Source 1: Seatemperature.org

See or edit raw graph data.

== Demographics ==
Historical population
Census	Pop.	Note	%±
1890	1,253		—
1900	1,864		48.8%
1910	1,644		−11.8%
1920	3,058		86.0%
1930	4,043		32.2%
1940	5,729		41.7%
1950	5,956		4.0%
1960	6,797		14.1%
1970	13,556		99.4%
1980	19,528		44.1%
1990	26,751		37.0%
2000	30,711		14.8%
2010	31,275		1.8%
2020	32,255		3.1%
2025 (est.)	31,609	▼	−2.0%
U.S. Decennial Census; 2020

Juneau first appeared on the 1890 U.S. Census. It was formally incorporated in 1900, and on July 1, 1970, the city of Juneau merged with the city of Douglas and the surrounding Greater Juneau Borough to form the current municipality, which accounts for the population jump between the 1970 and 1980 censuses.

=== 2020 census ===
Juneau city and borough, Alaska – Racial and ethnic composition Note: the US Census treats Hispanic/Latino as an ethnic category. This table excludes Latinos from the racial categories and assigns them to a separate category. Hispanics/Latinos may be of any race.
Race / Ethnicity (NH = Non-Hispanic)	Pop 1980	Pop 1990	Pop 2000	Pop 2010	Pop 2020	% 1980	% 1990	% 2000	% 2010	% 2020
White alone (NH)	16,251	21,257	22,498	21,065	19,673	83.22%	79.46%	73.26%	67.35%	60.99%
Black or African American alone (NH)	140	279	235	259	328	0.72%	1.04%	0.77%	0.83%	1.02%
Native American or Alaska Native alone (NH)	2,190	3,360	3,412	3,534	3,397	11.21%	12.56%	11.11%	11.30%	10.53%
Asian alone (NH)	504	1,097	1,422	1,879	2,086	2.58%	4.10%	4.63%	6.01%	6.47%
Native Hawaiian or Pacific Islander alone (NH)	x	x	112	213	469	x	x	0.36%	0.68%	1.45%
Other race alone (NH)	60	9	43	40	183	0.31%	0.03%	0.14%	0.13%	0.57%
Mixed race or Multiracial (NH)	x	x	1,949	2,697	4,042	x	x	6.35%	8.62%	12.53%
Hispanic or Latino (any race)	383	749	1,040	1,588	2,077	1.96%	2.80%	3.39%	5.08%	6.44%
Total	19,528	26,751	30,711	31,275	32,255	100.00%	100.00%	100.00%	100.00%	100.00%

As of the census of 2020, there were 31,275 people, 12,922 households. The population density was 11.9 people per square mile (4.6 people/km^{2}), making it the least densely populated state capital. There were 12,922 housing units at an average density of 4.0 units per square mile (1.5 units/km^{2}). The racial makeup of the city/borough was 64.7% White (62.5% Non-Hispanic White), 1.0% African American, 10.1% Native American or Alaska Native, 6.7% Asian, 1.3% Pacific Islander, and 14.3% from two or more races. 7.0% of the population were Hispanic or Latino of any race. 2.6% reported speaking Tagalog at home, and 2.4% reported speaking Spanish. The most reported ancestries in 2020 were:

- German (18.5%)
- English (17.8%)
- Irish (17.1%)
- Tlingit (9.9%)
- Filipino (7.6%)
- Scottish (6.3%)
- Norwegian (4.9%)
- French (3.7%)
- Mexican (3.6%)
- Italian (3.3%)

The median income for a household in the city/borough was $90,126. The per capita income for the city/borough was $45,607. 7.2% of the population was below the poverty line.

== Economy ==
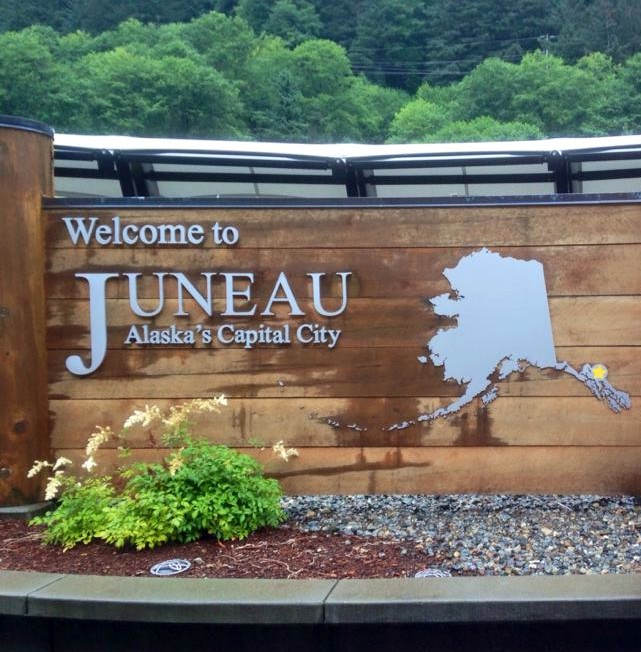
The "Welcome to Juneau" sign at the cruise port

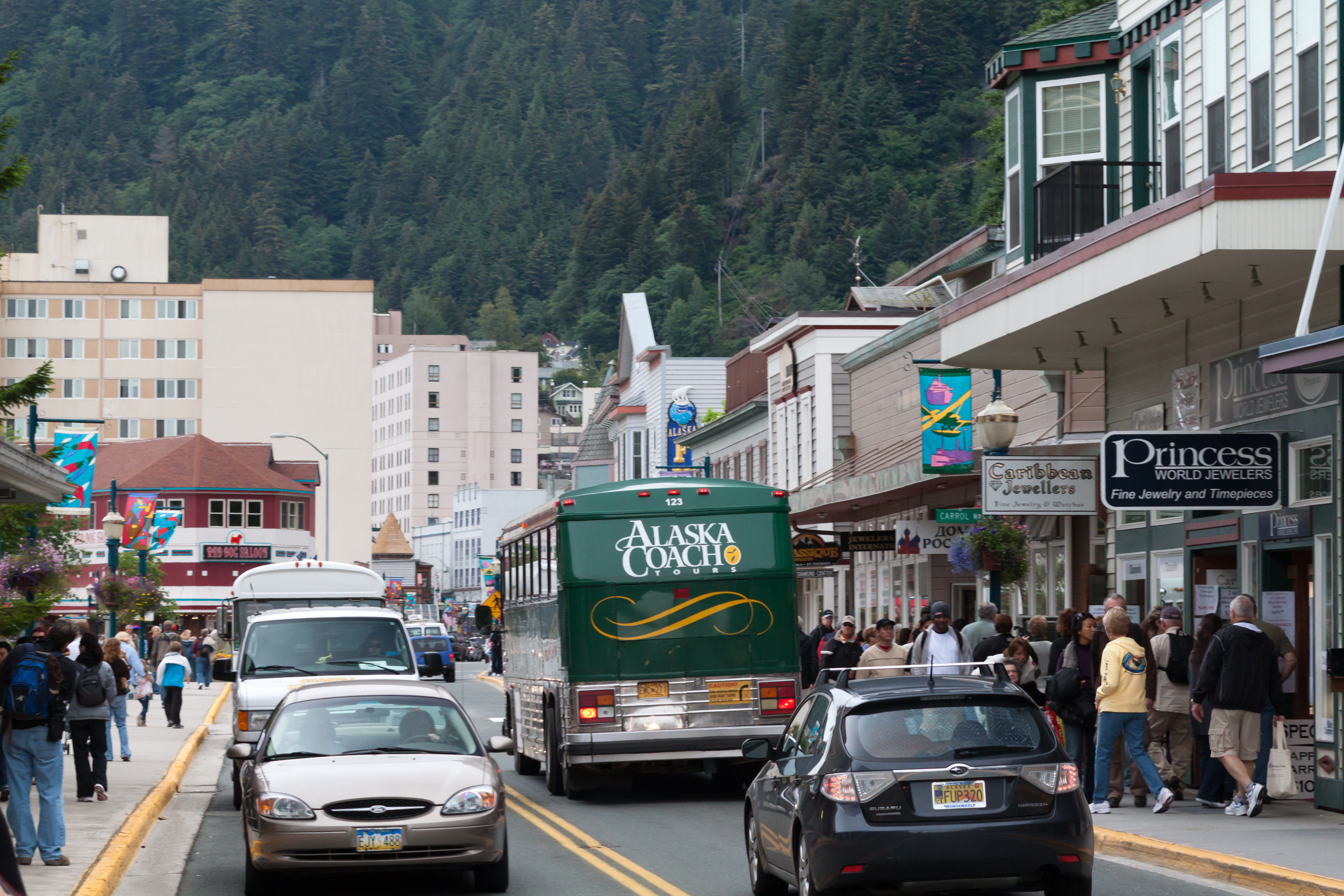
Tourists and tour buses on Franklin Street, looking north

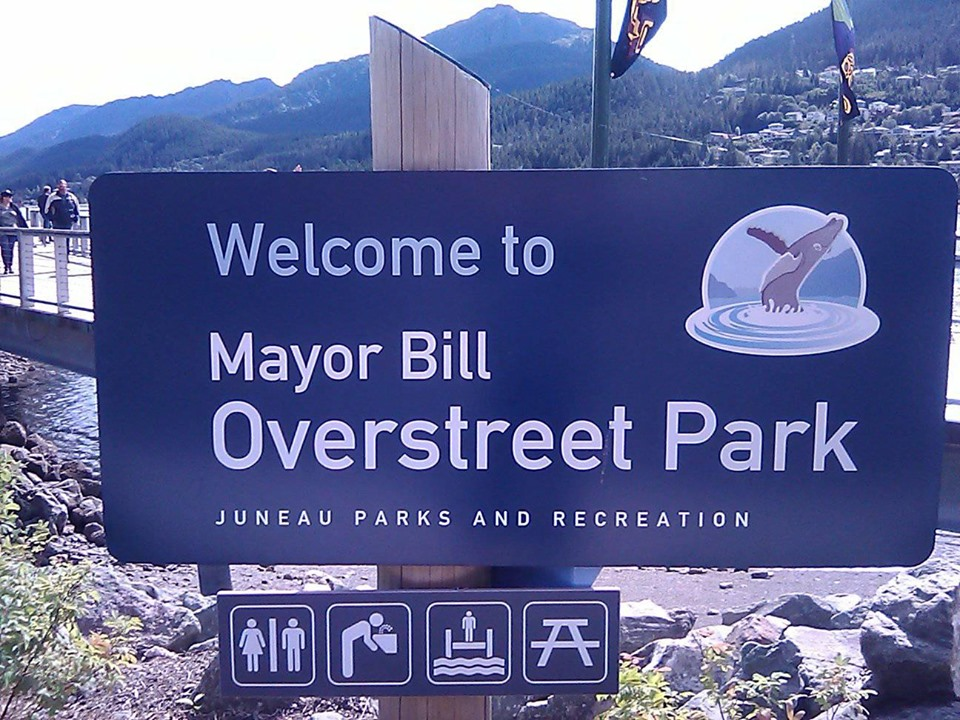
Mayor Bill Overstreet Park

The primary employer in Juneau is government including the state government, federal government (which has regional offices here, especially for resource agencies), municipal government (which includes the local airport, hospital, harbors, and school district), and the University of Alaska Southeast. State government offices and their indirect economic impact comprise approximately one-quarter of Juneau's economy.

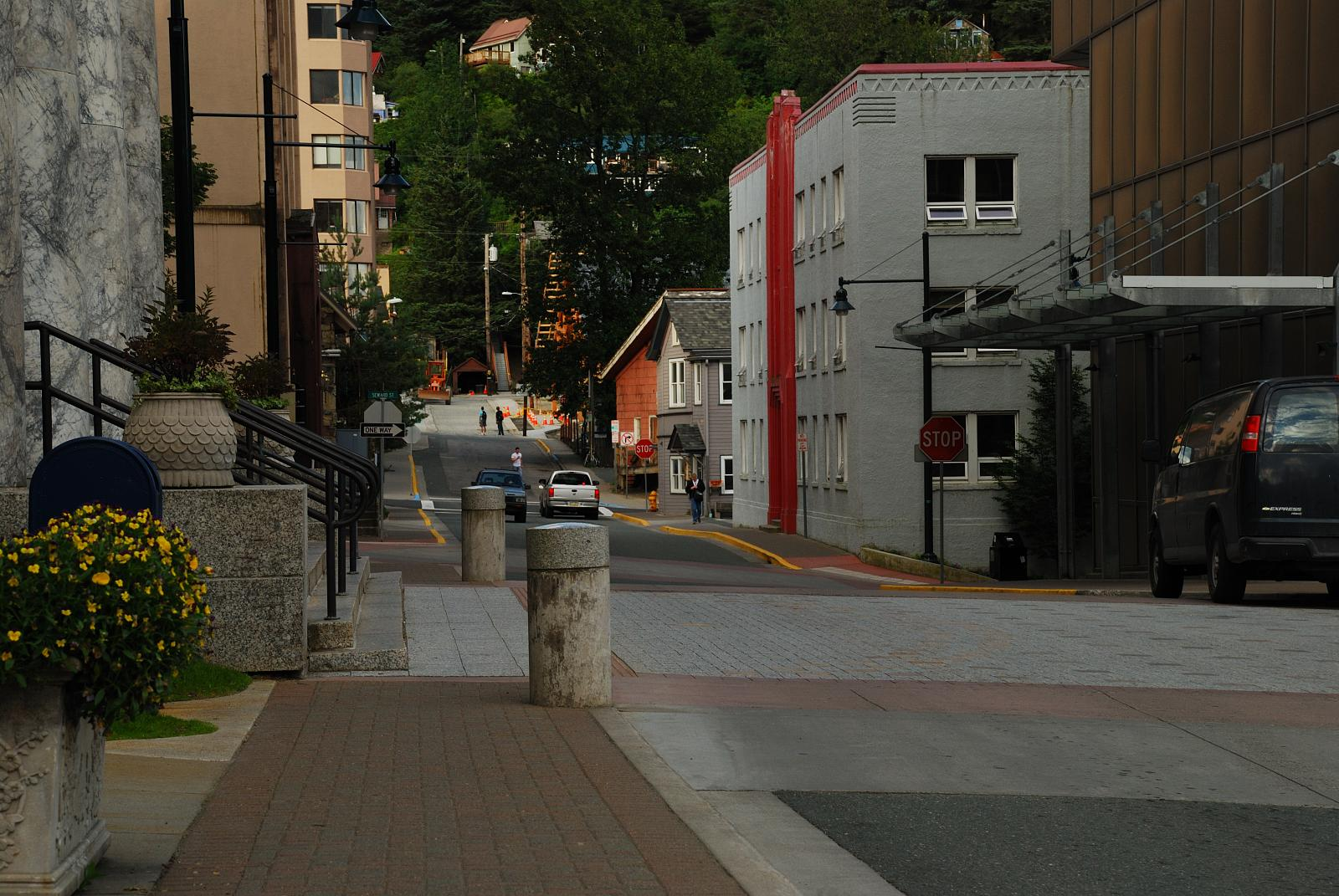
Fourth Street in downtown, looking east from the front of the Alaska State Capitol; the city's tallest building, Mendenhall Towers (12 stories tall), is partially visible in the background.

A large contributor to the local economy is the tourism industry, which generates most income in the summer months. In 2005, nearly an estimated one million cruise ship passengers visited the city between May and September. Now 1.7 million tourists per year travel to Juneau for the season ending in October 2026. Former politician Bill Ray, who lived in Juneau and represented Juneau in the Alaska Legislature, said, "Juneau doesn't go forward. They've prostituted themselves to tourism. It looks like a poor man's Lahaina (Lahaina, Hawaii)".

The fishing industry is a major part of the Juneau economy, while not as strong as when a halibut schooner fleet generated considerable profits. The city was recently the 49th most lucrative U.S. fisheries port by volume and 45th by value. In 2004 it took in 15 million pounds of fish and shellfish, valued at 21.5 million dollars, according to the National Marine Fisheries Service. While the port of Juneau has comparatively little seafood processing compared to other towns of this size in Alaska, hundreds of commercial fishing boats sell their fish to plants in nearby Sitka, Hoonah, Petersburg and Ketchikan. The largest fleets operating from Juneau are the gillnet and troll salmon fleets.

Juneau has many of the commercial fishing associations in Alaska. These include the Alaska Trollers Association, United Fishermen of Alaska, United Southeast Alaska Gillnetters Association, and the Southeast Alaska Seiners Association.

Real estate agencies, federally funded highway construction, and mining are still viable non-government local industries. Alaska Seaplanes, an airline, has its headquarters in Juneau. As of the 2010 census, there were 1,107 businesses with operations in Juneau borough; with a population of 31,275 there is a per capita of about 28 people per business.

Juneau's only power utility is Alaska Electric Light & Power (AEL&P). Most of the electricity in the borough is generated at the Snettisham Hydroelectric facility in the southern end of the borough, accessible only by boat or plane. In April 2008, an avalanche destroyed three transmission towers, forcing AEL&P to supply almost all of the borough's electricity from diesel-powered generators for one month.

Headquartered in Juneau is the Marine Exchange of Alaska, a nonprofit organization which operates an extensive vessel tracking network and ensures safe maritime operations for the entire state.

== Culture ==
Juneau hosts the annual Alaska Folk Festival, Juneau Jazz & Classics music festival, and Celebration, a biennial Alaska Native cultural festival. A city-owned ski resort, Eaglecrest is on Douglas Island.

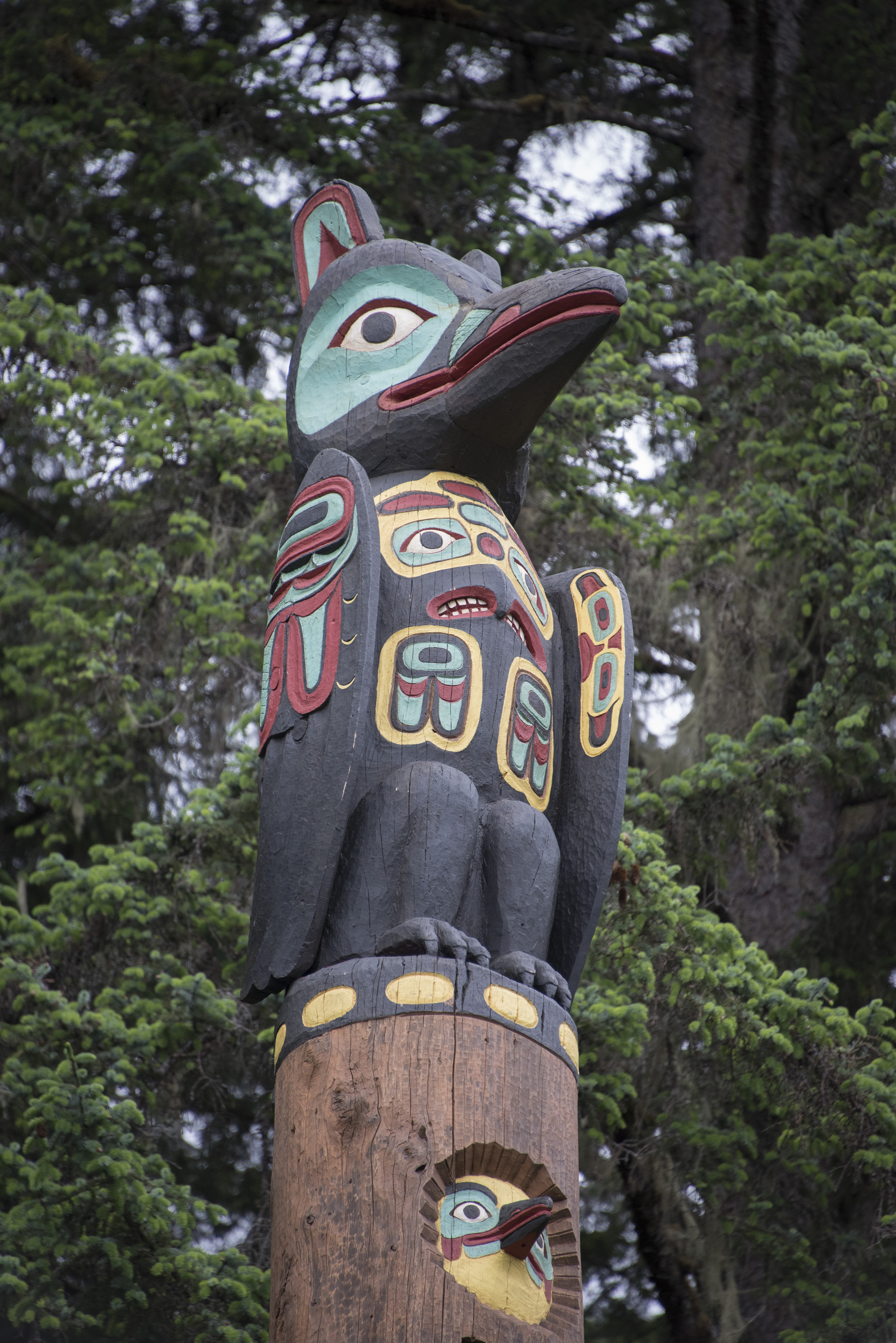
Yaxté totem pole

The city-owned Treadwell ice-skating rink is located on the south end of Douglas Island. It is named after the Treadwell Gold Mine, which formerly operated on lands adjacent the rink. The rink has figure skating, hockey, and free open skates. From April to September when there is no ice, it is used for rollerblading, roller hockey, tennis, basketball, and concerts.

The city has a vibrant performing arts scene; it is home to Perseverance Theatre, Alaska's largest professional theater, the non-profit Theatre in the Rough, Theater Alaska, Theater at Latitude 58, and Juneau Ghost Light Theatre (formerly the Juneau Douglas Little Theatre). The Juneau Symphony regularly performs. The local opera companies are the Juneau Lyric Opera and Opera to Go. Twice a year the JUMP Society hosts screenings of locally made short films. Gold Town Nickelodeon is a local art house cinema which plays independent films, foreign films, classics, and has operated a drive-in.

Downtown Juneau has art galleries which participate in the monthly First Friday Art Walk and annual Gallery Walk held in the first week of December. The Juneau Arts & Humanities Council coordinates certain events and operates the Juneau Arts & Culture Center featuring a community center, gallery and lobby shop. The University of Alaska Southeast Campus offers lectures, concerts, and theater performances. Sealaska Heritage, the nonprofit affiliate of the Sealaska Corporation, operates the Walter Soboleff Building which is decorated by carvings and hosts cultural exhibits. Juneau is also home to Tahku, a life-sized bronze sculpture of a humpback whale.

== Efforts to move state capital ==
There have been efforts and discussions about moving Alaska's capital away from Juneau. A primary motivating factor has been concerns about Juneau's remote location. In 1960, 56% of voters voted against a measure to move the capital to a location in the "Cook Inlet-Railbelt Area" (the specific location would have been selected by a committee appointed by the governor). In 1962, 55% of voters voted against a measure to move the capital to "Western Alaska... within 30 miles of Anchorage". "Senior" state senators would have been chosen to select three potential sites to be put to a vote by later vote by the state's electorate.

In 1974, at a time when Alaska was expected to be flush with new funds from the Trans-Alaska Pipeline, 56% of Alaskan voters approved an initiative to move the capital. The initiative specified that the new location must be within 300 miles of both Anchorage and Fairbanks and have at least 100 square miles of donated public land. The location was to be selected by a committee appointed by the governor. The committee proposed Larson Lake, Mount Yenlo, and Willow as sites, and Willow received 53% of votes in a 1976 statewide vote. However, in 1978, voters rejected a measure to fund a move to Willow, with 55% of voters voting against spending $996 million to move the capital there. In 1978, voters also approved the Fiscally Responsible Alaskans Needing Knowledge (FRANK) Initiative, which required that all costs of moving the capital be disclosed and approved by Alaskans before the move commenced. In 1982, 53% of voters voted against spending roughly $2.9 billion to move the capital to Willow. This vote also had the effect of repealing the previous approval of moving the capital.

In 1994, a statewide initiative to move Alaska's capital to Wasilla was defeated by a vote of 116,277 (54.7%) to 96,398 (45.3%). At the same time, 77% of voters approved a renewed FRANK Initiative. In 2002, Alaskan voters again voted against moving the state's capital. Advocacy for a capital move has continued.

== Notable people ==
- Carlos Boozer (born 1981), professional basketball player
- Gab Cody, playwright, filmmaker
- Dale DeArmond (1914–2006), printmaker
- Neva Egan (1914–2011), educator and First Lady of Alaska
- Janet Gardner (born 1962), singer of the hard rock band Vixen
- Al Gross (born 1962), surgeon, fisherman, and politician
- Elaine Hopson (born 1939), Oregonian politician born in Juneau
- Tessa Hulls (born 1984), writer and illustrator, winner of a 2025 Pulitzer Prize for the graphic memoir Feeding Ghosts
- Mary McGee (1936–2024), motorcycle racer
- Charles Melton (born 1991), actor
- Joshua Morrow (born 1974), actor known for starring in daytime drama The Young and the Restless
- Rie Muñoz (1921–2015), artist and Bureau of Indian Affairs educator
- Elizabeth Peratrovich (1911–1958), civil rights activist, grand president of the Alaska Native Sisterhood, member of the Tlingit nation
- Macy Rodman (born 1989), musician and podcaster
- Linda Rosenthal, violinist
- Paul Rosenthal (born 1942), violinist
- Lynn Schooler, photographer, writer who authored The Blue Bear
- James Schoppert (1947–1992), carver, painter
- Molly Smith, theater director

== Government and politics ==
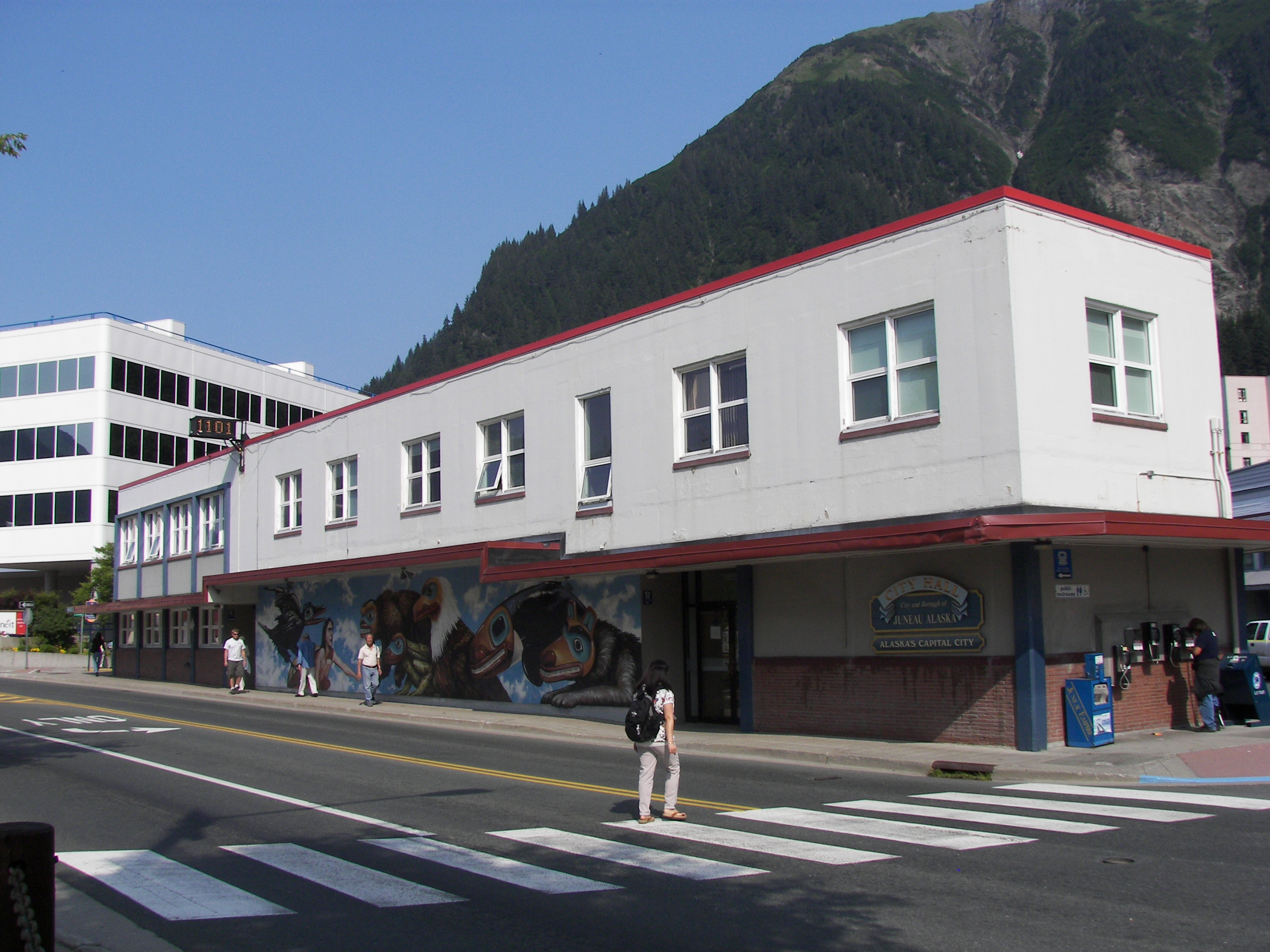
Juneau City Hall

The City and Borough of Juneau operates under a council–manager form of government. The mayor is the titular head of the city, the presiding officer (or chair) of the Juneau Assembly (council), and is one of three members of the body which is elected at-large, or areawide. The other six members are elected by single-member districts: as of the last redistricting by the Assembly in 2003 there are two districts:

- District 1 precincts
  - Douglas
  - Juneau No. 1
  - Juneau No. 2
  - Juneau No. 3
  - Juneau Airport
  - Lemon Creek
  - North Douglas
- District 2 precincts
  - Auke Bay
  - Lynn Canal
  - Mendenhall Valley No. 1
  - Mendenhall Valley No. 2
  - Mendenhall Valley No. 3
  - Mendenhall Valley No. 4

A city manager handles daily affairs and a city attorney is responsible for working with legal matters.

The districts are nearly aligned with the boundaries of the 31st and 32nd election districts which were established by the state. Mainly the difference is that the 32nd District includes communities outside the CBJ: Gustavus, Kupreanof, Petersburg, Skagway and Tenakee Springs. The Juneau Airport precinct is in the 31st district, which is otherwise identical to the 2nd Assembly District.

Juneau was split into two state house districts by the state during redistricting in the early 1990. The districts comprising downtown Juneau, Douglas Island and surrounding areas have exclusively elected Democrats to the Alaska House of Representatives and the districts comprising Mendenhall Valley and surrounding areas have mostly elected Republicans. The 31st District is represented in the House by Andi Story, a Democrat who has been in office since 2018. The 32nd District is represented by Democrat Sara Hannan. The two election districts form Alaska Senate District Q and the seat is held by Democrat Jesse Kiehl. The last Republican to represent Juneau in the state Senate was Elton Engstrom Jr., the father of Cathy Muñoz. He left office at the end of his term in early 1971, after failing to be re-elected in 1970.

United States presidential election results for Juneau, Alaska
Year	Republican		Democratic		Third party(ies)	
Year	No.	%	No.	%	No.	%
1960	2,328	52.49%	2,107	47.51%	0	0.00%
1964	1,544	29.09%	3,763	70.91%	0	0.00%
1968	2,532	44.70%	2,770	48.91%	362	6.39%
1972	3,678	56.00%	2,725	41.49%	165	2.51%
1976	4,676	58.80%	2,887	36.30%	390	4.90%
1980	4,600	44.80%	3,594	35.00%	2,075	20.21%
1984	7,323	56.60%	5,292	40.90%	324	2.50%
1988	5,957	48.20%	6,056	49.00%	345	2.79%
1992	5,348	35.00%	6,754	44.20%	3,178	20.80%
1996	6,004	39.30%	6,768	44.30%	2,506	16.40%
2000	7,270	45.30%	6,403	39.90%	2,375	14.80%
2004	5,515	47.20%	5,784	49.50%	386	3.30%
2008	7,124	40.70%	9,819	56.10%	560	3.20%
2012	6,108	37.90%	9,251	57.40%	757	4.70%
2016	5,690	34.57%	8,734	53.07%	2,033	12.35%
2020	6,210	35.11%	10,834	61.25%	643	3.64%
2024	5,942	35.00%	10,305	60.70%	730	4.30%

Juneau is one of the most Democratic boroughs in Alaska. The borough has voted Democratic in the U.S. presidential election in every election (except for one) since 1988.

While more state jobs are based in Anchorage than in Juneau, the state government still maintains a substantial presence in Juneau. A number of executive branch departments, as well as the legislature, are based in Juneau. In response to repeated pressure from Southcentral Alaska to move either the capital or the legislature, the legislature acquired and renovated several buildings in the vicinity of the Alaska State Capitol, which hold committee meeting rooms and administrative offices for the Legislative Affairs Agency. The buildings were named for former legislators Terry Miller and Thomas B. Stewart. Stewart, a Juneau native and son of early Juneau mayor Benjamin D. Stewart, represented Juneau in the Senate during the 1st Alaska State Legislature. He later served in Juneau's Alaska Superior Court judgeship and was noted as an authority on the territory and early statehood eras of Alaska's history.

A nine-story federal government building in Juneau near the mouth of Gold Creek and a short distance east of the Juneau-Douglas Bridge, houses many federal agencies, the United States District Court for the District of Alaska, and Juneau's main post office. It is in the area known as "The Flats". The building was designed by Linn A. Forrest and built in 1966.

== Education ==
=== Primary and secondary schools ===
Juneau is served by the Juneau School District, and includes the following schools:

- Sayéik: Gastineau Elementary School
- Harborview Elementary School
- Riverbend Elementary School
- Mendenhall River Elementary School
- Sítʼ Eetí Shaanáx̱ - Glacier Valley Elementary School
- Auke Bay Elementary School
- Juneau Community Charter School: an optional program (kindergarten through eighth grade)
- Montessori Borealis School: an alternative school with (Childrenʼs House: preschool and kindergarten; Elementary: first through sixth grade; Adolescent Montessori Program: seventh and eighth grades)
- Tlingit Culture Language & Literacy: an optional program (kindergarten through fifth grade)
- Dzantik'i Heeni Middle School
- Floyd Dryden Middle School
- Juneau-Douglas Yadaa.at Kalé High School
- Thunder Mountain High School
- Yaaḵoosgé Daakahídi Alternative High School
- HomeBRIDGE: a homeschooling program

The following private schools serve Juneau:

- (Glacier) Valley Baptist Academy
- Faith Community School
- Thunder Mountain Learning Center (formerly Thunder Mountain Academy)
- Juneau Seventh-day Adventist Christian School
- Juneau Montessori School

=== Colleges and universities ===
The University of Alaska Southeast is within the Auke Bay community along the shore of Auke Lake. Juneau-Douglas Community College, founded in 1956, and Southeastern Senior College which was established in 1972, were merged in 1980 forming the University of Alaska Juneau. The university was restructured as the University of Alaska Southeast to include Ketchikan and Sitka campuses. The university offers undergraduate and graduate studies. The University of Alaska Fairbanks has a satellite campus in Juneau for mainly graduate level students in marine studies.

== Transportation ==
Juneau is not directly accessible by road, although there are road connections within the borough to rural areas. The Glacier Highway section of Alaska Route 7 is within Juneau. Primary access to the city is by air and sea. Cars and trucks are transported to and from Juneau by barge or the Alaska Marine Highway ferry system.

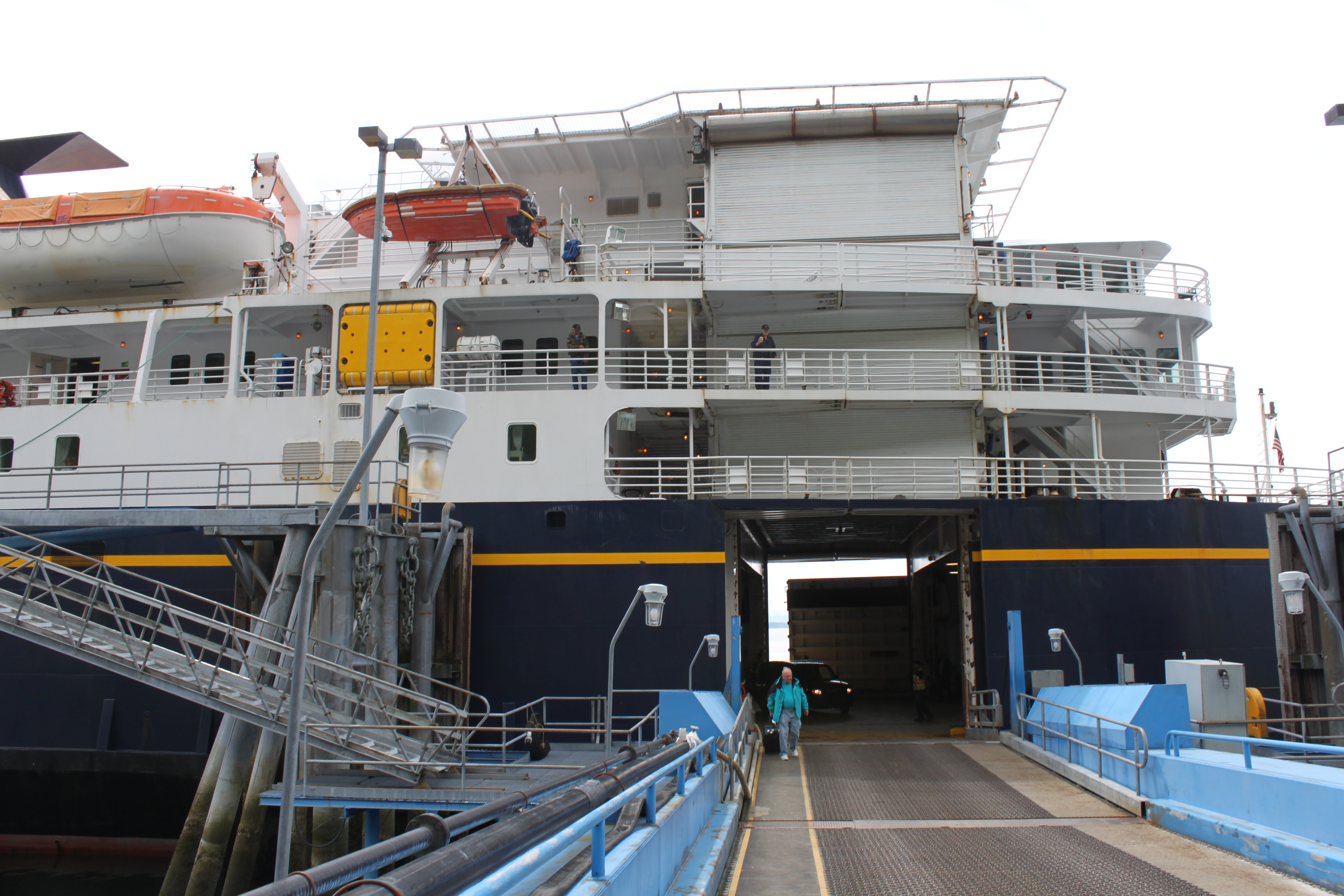
An Alaska Marine Highway ferry boat docked in Juneau

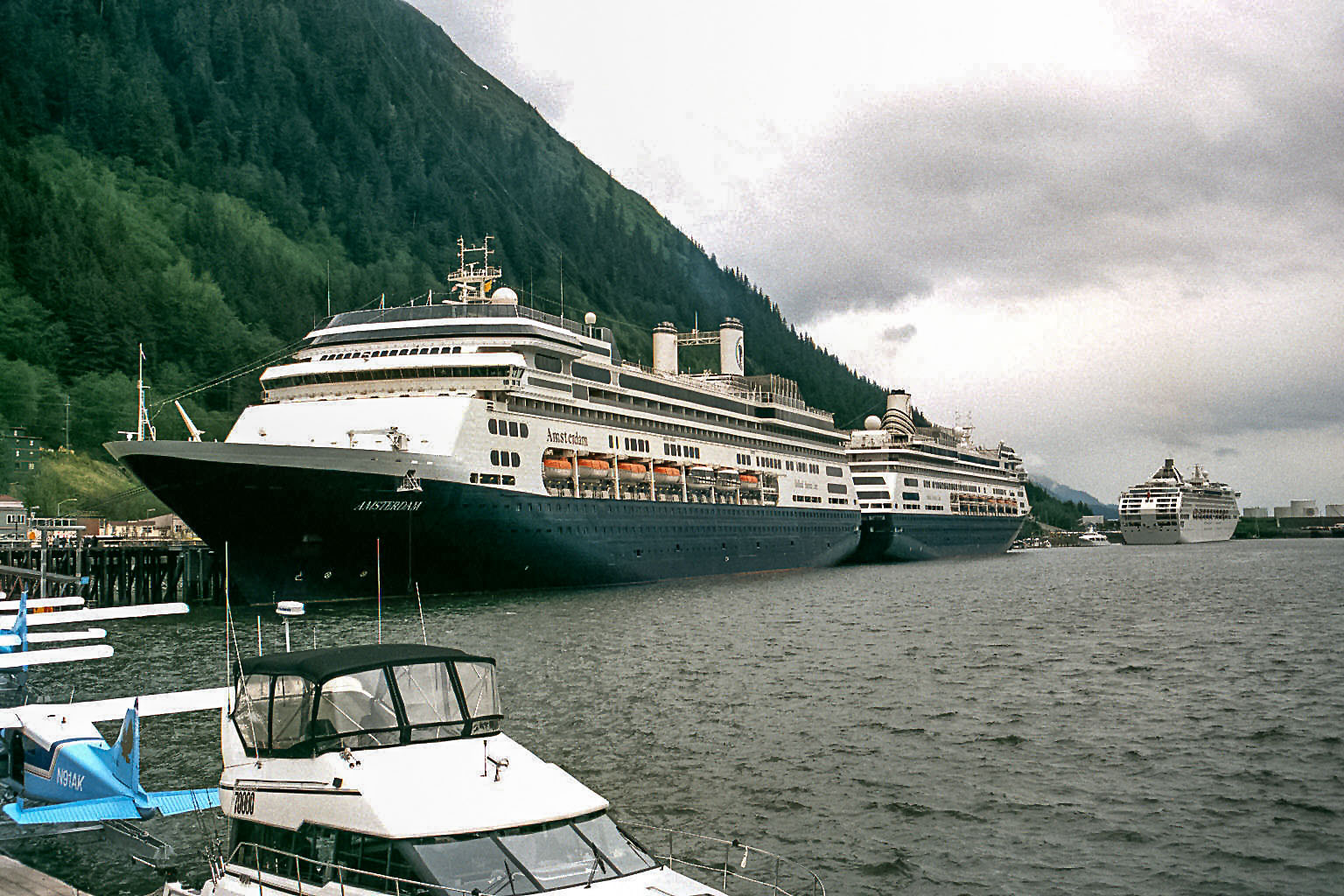
Cruise ships in Juneau

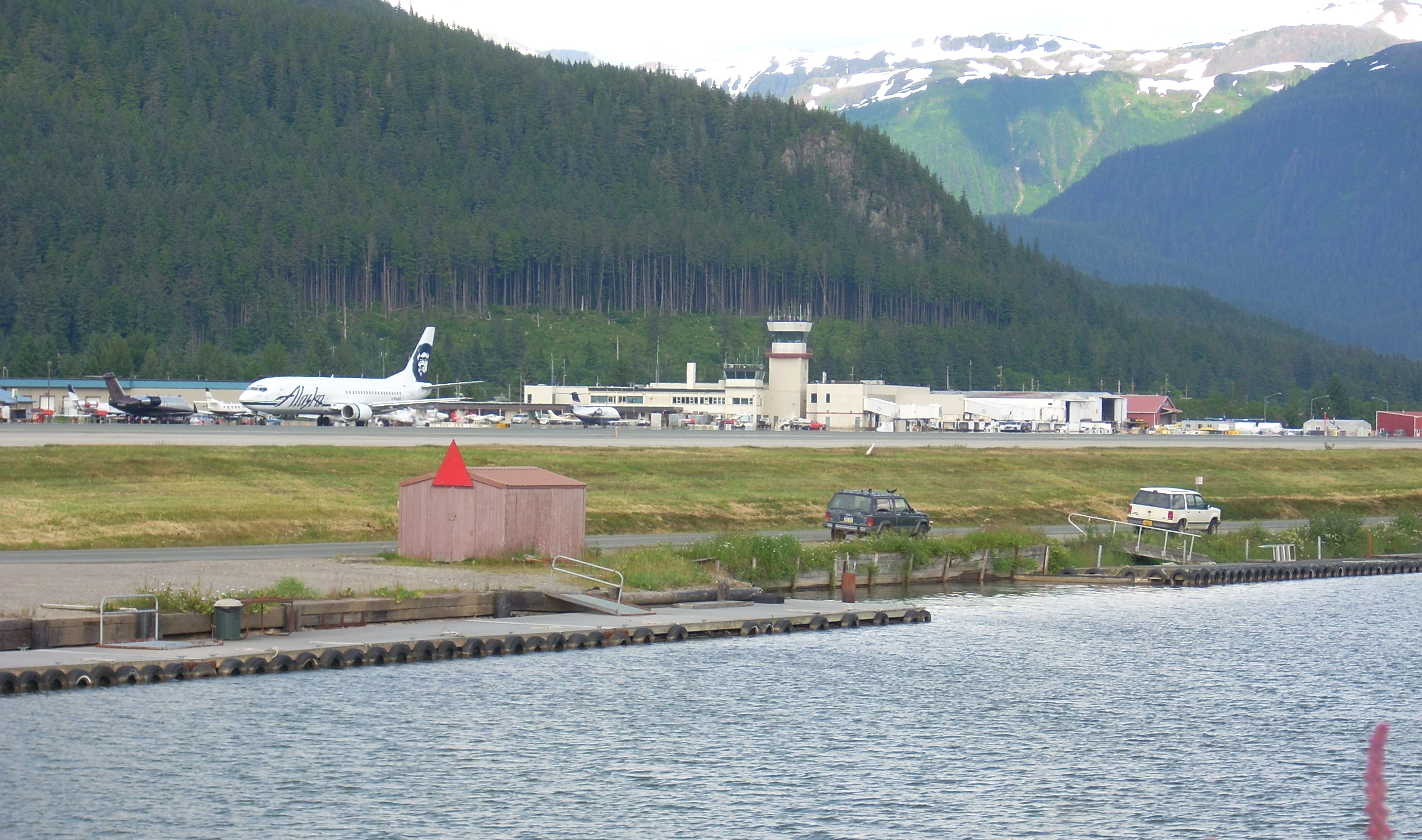
Alaska Airlines jet shown moments after landing at Juneau International Airport

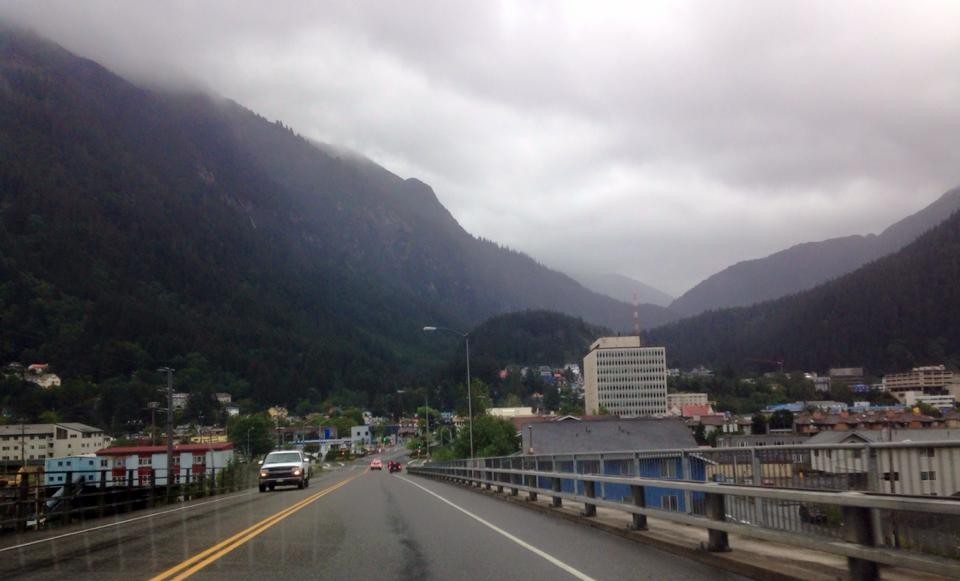
View of downtown Juneau from the Juneau-Douglas Bridge, which connects mainland Juneau with Douglas Island

=== Sea ===
The state-owned ferry system is the Alaska Marine Highway. The ferries connect Juneau with 13 other cities in Southeast Alaska and other destinations north via Whittier, as well as with the continental road system in Bellingham, Washington and Prince Rupert, British Columbia. On the northern route the ferries dock in Haines and Skagway connecting to the Alaska Highway via Whitehorse, Yukon. In addition to the traditional Alaska Marine Highway ferries, high-speed catamarans known as "fast cats" connect Juneau with Haines and Skagway (91 miles (146 km)) in two hours, about half the time of the traditional ferries travel time.

=== Air ===
Juneau International Airport serves the city and borough of Juneau. Alaska Airlines services the airport year round, operating over 11 daily departures. Alaska Airlines serves Juneau and other Southeast Alaska villages via "Milk Run" flights which make multiple stops to and from Seattle or Anchorage. It also connects Juneau to other cities in the country through connections in Seattle or Anchorage.

In the summer, Delta Air Lines serves Juneau from its major West Coast hub in Seattle, providing global service to and from Southeast Alaska without having to switch air carriers.

MarkAir and Western Airlines serviced Juneau in the past. Alaska Seaplanes and Ward Air offer charter seaplane service from the seaplane floatpond "runway" that runs parallel to the traditional tarmac. They offer service to the smaller villages in the surrounding area as well as flightseeing.

Alaska Seaplanes, Harris Air, and Island Air Express provide FAA Part 135 scheduled commuter service to communities throughout Southeast Alaska. These trips are the only connections to the outside world for many of these villages. Alaska Seaplanes has restored scheduled international service to Juneau with 3 weekly trips to Whitehorse, Canada, while Ward Air provides unscheduled charter flights to Canada.

=== Roads ===
Avalanche hazards, steep slopes, cold weather and environmental protection concerns are factors that make road construction and maintenance both difficult and costly.

The Juneau-Douglas Bridge connects the Juneau mainland with Douglas Island.

No roads connect Juneau to the rest of North America; ferries allow access to the road network. There is a lack of places to build a road. A route to the east would fail due to an icefield the size of Rhode Island separating Juneau from Atlin, British Columbia. Similarly, the route up the Taku River is blocked by ever-shifting glaciers. Juneau is one of only four state capitals not served by an interstate highway (the others being Dover, Delaware; Jefferson City, Missouri; and Pierre, South Dakota).

==== Juneau Access Project ====
Juneau's roads remain separate from other roads in Alaska and in the Lower 48. In the past there have been plans to connect Juneau to Haines and Skagway by road since before 1972, with funding for the first feasibility study acquired in 1987. The State of Alaska Department of Transportation and Public Facilities announced in 2005 that the connection was to be provided partly by road, and partly by fast ferry. A 51-mile (82 km) road would be built on the east side of Lynn Canal to a new ferry terminal at the Katzehin River estuary. A ferry would be able to transport cars from the terminal to Haines and Skagway and the North American road system. In 2006, the project was estimated to cost $258 million, and in 2007, the estimate was increased to $350 million. Annual costs have been estimated from $2.1 million to $12 million, depending on the length of the road. The Western Federal Lands Center estimated the project would cost $491 million.

Local opinions on constructing a road link to the outside world were mixed. Some residents saw such a road as a much-needed link between Juneau and the rest of the world which will also provide great economic benefits to the city, while many other residents were concerned about the project's financial costs along with environmental and social impacts it could have on Lynn Canal.

Citing the state's multibillion-dollar financial crisis, Governor Bill Walker announced on December 15, 2016, that the state is no longer backing construction of the Juneau Access Improvements Project. Eventually the project lost its steam and was ended in July 2018 with the Federal Highway Administration (FHWA) releasing their Record of Decision, selecting the no-build alternative for the Juneau Access Project, halting construction on the road.

=== Public transportation ===
Local government operates a bus service under the name Capital Transit.

=== Walking, hiking, and biking ===
Residents walk, hike, or ride bicycles for recreational purposes and for transportation. The downtown area of Juneau has sidewalks, outdoors flights of stairs, and the neighborhoods on the hill above downtown are accessible by foot. Some roads in the city also have bike lanes, and there is a bike path parallel to the main highway.

== Infrastructure ==
=== Healthcare ===
The city and borough is primarily served by Bartlett Regional Hospital in Juneau's Twin Lakes area. The hospital also serves the nearby remote communities of Hoonah, Haines, and Skagway. Individuals from those communities are airlifted in emergencies to the hospital via helicopter or air ambulance (a 20-minute to a 45-minute flight).

== Utilities ==
Juneau is served by the following utilities:

- Electric: Alaska Electric Light and Power Company
- Water and sewer: City and Borough of Juneau

== Media ==
=== Print ===
The Juneau Empire is published Wednesdays and Saturdays. The Capital City Weekly was published weekly, and the Empire runs a few stories in a CCW section. The Juneau Independent is a nonprofit online newspaper. The University of Alaska Southeast has The Whalesong, a college newspaper.

=== Radio ===
- AM: KJNO 630, KINY 800, KXXJ 1330
- FM: KTKU 105.1, KSUP 106.3, and LPFM station KBJZ-LP 94.1.
- Public Radio: KTOO 104.3, KXLL "Excellent Radio" 100.7 and KRNN "Rain Country Radio" 102.7 (all three operated by KTOO).

The studios of CoastAlaska (a regional public radio station consortium), are in Juneau. AP (the Associated Press), Anchorage news outlets, and other Alaska media entities, send reporters to Juneau during the annual Legislative session.

=== Television ===
Juneau's major television affiliates are: KTOO (PBS), KTOO 360TV (formerly "360North) "Alaska's public affairs channel" (operated by KTOO), KATH-LD (NBC), KYEX-LD (CBS/MyNetworkTV on DT2), and KJUD (ABC)/The CW on DT2/Fox on DT3).

== Sister cities ==
Juneau has three active sister city relationships.

- Whitehorse, Yukon, Canada
- Vladivostok, Primorsky Krai, Russia
- Kalibo, Aklan, Philippines

It also has two relationships which are in emeritus status, meaning they are not currently active.

- Mishan City, China
- Chiayi City, Taiwan Province, Republic of China

== See also ==
- Juneau gold belt
- Adair-Kennedy Memorial Park
- Capital City Fire/Rescue
- Evergreen Cemetery
- Hurff Ackerman Saunders Federal Building and Robert Boochever U.S. Courthouse
- Juneau Mountain Rescue
- National Register of Historic Places listings in Juneau, Alaska
- Alaska Route 7
- Out the road, a region of Juneau
- USS Juneau, 3 ships
