= Paul Rosenthal (violinist) =

American violinist (born 1942)

Paul Rosenthal (born 1942) is an American violinist.

Rosenthal began playing the violin when he was three. He went to the Juilliard School in New York City and studied at the University of Southern California under acclaimed master Jascha Heifetz, a violinist. He and his wife Linda Rosenthal moved to Fairbanks, Alaska in 1969 (his brother, Paul, lived in Fairbanks at the time) and then to Juneau in 1974. Paul founded the Sitka Summer Music Festival, a chamber music festival which is held annually in Sitka and was the artistic director for 40 years. He joined the faculty at the University of Alaska Fairbanks and later at the University of Alaska Anchorage.

in 1992, he was a soloist with the Naumburg Orchestral Concerts, in the Naumburg Bandshell, Central Park, in the summer series.

He has recorded on RCA, Vox, Fidelio, Arabesque, Vanguard, and Biddulph.
