= Fritz Cove =

- Location within Alaska
- Location: Stephens Passage, Juneau, Alaska
- Coordinates: 58°19′41″N 134°38′30″W
- River sources: Cove Creek, Elevenmile Creek, Fish Creek
- Basin countries: United States
- Max. depth: 30 fathoms (55 m)
- Islands: Spuhn Island

Fritz Cove is a bay on the northwestern coast of Douglas Island in the City and Borough of Juneau, Alaska, United States. Lying in Stephens Passage, it is 8 miles (13 km) northwest of the city of Juneau.

== History ==
Historically, Fritz Cove was used for fishing by Alaska Natives, especially the Auke people. A summer camp named Aangoox̱a Yé was located at the mouth of Fish Creek. Scottish-American naturalist John Muir camped at the bay on November 10, 1879.

The area was surveyed by the USS Jamestown in 1880; Lieutenant F. M. Symonds named the bay after his son. The name was first published by the United States Coast and Geodetic Survey in 1881.

== Geography ==
Fritz Cove and Gastineau Channel became linked in 1960 through a United States Army Corps of Engineers effort to dredge a navigation route.

Streams flowing into Fritz Cove include Cove Creek, Elevenmile Creek, and Fish Creek. Islands in the bay include Spuhn Island. Depths in the bay range from 8 to 30 fathoms (15 to 55 m).

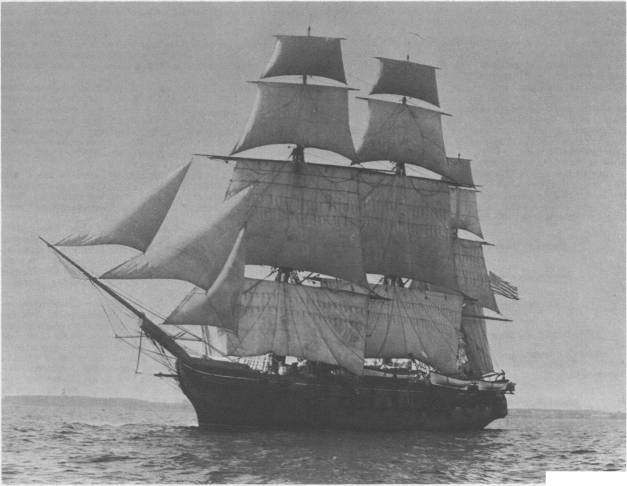
The USS Jamestown explored southeast Alaska, including Fritz Cove, in 1880 and 1881.

Dungeness crabs, Tanner crabs, and king salmon live in the cove; molting of the male Tanner crabs in the cove has been documented since the 1970s. Scoters, grebes, mergansers, and marbled murrelets can also be seen in the area.
