= Mount Bradley (disambiguation) =

Mount Bradley is a mountain in Antarctica.

Mount Bradley may also refer to:

- Mount Bradley (Siskiyou County, California)
- Mount Bradley (Inyo County, California)
- Mount Bradley (Flathead County, Montana)
- Mount Bradley (Alaska)
- Mount Bradley (Mount Jumbo), on Douglas Island
