= Elevenmile Creek =

Coordinates: 58°19′12″N 134°38′36″W

Location
- Country: United States
- State: Alaska

Physical characteristics
- Source
  - location: Douglas Island
- Mouth
  - location: Fritz Cove, Stephens Passage
  - elevation: 0 ft (0 m)

Elevenmile Creek is a river on Douglas Island in the City and Borough of Juneau (CBJ), Alaska, United States. Its origin is in hills to the southeast and it flows northwest to Fritz Cove, a part of Stephens Passage; it is 1.6 miles (2.6 km) southwest of Entrance Point and 8.6 miles (13.8 km) west of the city of Juneau.

The name refers to the stream's location, between the ten- and eleven-mile markers of the North Douglas Highway.

A chemical water quality record for the stream dates to 1967. A 1986 panning of water from Elevenmile Creek exhibited a small amount of lead.

A wood harvest area owned by the state of Alaska extends south of the highway from Cove Creek to Elevenmile Creek. The stream also runs through CBJ-owned land.

== See also ==
- Fish Creek and Ninemile Creek are nearby streams on Douglas Island.
