= Douglas Indian Village =

Destroyed Native village in Alaska

- Akáx Yaa Andagán (Tlingit)
- Interactive map of Douglas Indian Village
- 58.2753°N 134.3906°W
- Type: Village
- Location: Douglas Island
- Nearest city: Juneau, Alaska

History
- Demolished: 1962

The Douglas Indian Village (Akáx Yaa Andagán) was the winter village of the Taku Kwáan Tlingit. The village was on Douglas Island, now a part of Juneau, Alaska, United States. In the summer of 1962, while the residents were away at Fish Camp, the village was declared abandoned and set on fire to make way for the Douglas Harbor.

== Background ==
The Douglas Indian Village was the winter village of the Taku Kwáan, who made their summer fish camp on the Taku River. It comprised about twenty structures on pilings and had no access to running water or electricity. In 1946, the Douglas Indian Association approached the Alaska Native Service for a loan to purchase small boats for the Native fishermen of the Douglas Indian Village. Due to insurance requirements that were a part of the loan, the boats needed to be kept in a harbor that would protect them. The Alaska Native Service then approached the City of Douglas and the Army Corps of Engineers for assistance with a small boat harbor. The Corps of Engineers provided a proposal that would have removed the village, dredged a harbor, and used the materials from the dredging to backfill a site upon which the village would be rebuilt. Rather than relocate the village, the plans were shelved.

== Legal protection ==
The Organic Act of 1884 provided for the protection of lands stating that "the Indians ... [in Alaska] shall not be disturbed in the possession of any lands actually in their use or occupation or now claimed by them, but the terms under which such persons may acquire the title to such lands is reserved for future legislation by Congress". There is photographic evidence of the village dating back to the late 1800s, and the Douglas Indian Association (DIA) Tribal Government cites an 1899 census putting the population at 600. The tribe was recognized by the Federal Government in 1941, and the plans drawn up for Douglas Harbor included the village. A report by the Indian Law Reasource Center, commissioned for the Douglas Indian Association concluded that taken together, this was irrefutable evidence that the village was in use, and should have been protected by the Organic Act.

In 1960, the city of Douglas requested the conveyance of tidelands that include the Douglas Indian Village for the construction of a new harbor. The land conveyance was completed in 1963, without provisions for indigenous claims to the land. In 1962, the City of Douglas commissioned a survey to prove that the village was on city lands, to establish the village as a part of the city and challenging the village's claim to the land. Under this challenge, the Bureau of Indian Affairs (BIA) disclaimed their jurisdiction over the village, effectively denying the village protection under the Organic Act. At the time the BIA made this decision, two members of the BIA Realty Office were also serving on the City of Douglas zoning commission, the primary agency pushing the construction of a new harbor.

== Condemnation and destruction ==
In the summer of 1962, while the villagers were at fish camp, the City of Douglas declared the buildings abandoned, condemned them, and had them bulldozed and burned. Around 20 buildings were destroyed, along with personal effects and tools for winter employment. As the village was condemned for being abandoned rather than through eminent domain, little to no compensation was offered for the destruction of property. Without resources, the community was forced to disperse, and the DIA tribal council was disbanded until the 1990s. The site of the village has since been converted to a public park, and is now part of the City and Borough of Juneau.

== Apology ==
In 2024, the City and Borough of Juneau issued an official apology to Douglas Indian Association for the burning.
