= Ninemile Creek (Juneau, Alaska) =

Coordinates: 58°20′17″N 134°34′24″W

Location
- Country: United States

Physical characteristics
- Source
  - location: Douglas Island
- Mouth
  - location: Gastineau Channel
  - elevation: 33 ft (10 m)

Ninemile Creek is a river on Douglas Island in the City and Borough of Juneau, Alaska, United States. Its origin is in hills to the southeast and it flows northwest to Gastineau Channel near West Juneau. It is 1.2 miles (1.9 km) east of Entrance Point and 6.4 miles (10.3 km) northwest of the city of Juneau.

== See also ==
- Fish Creek is a nearby stream on Douglas Island.
