= Mayor Bill Overstreet Park =

Park in Alaska, United States

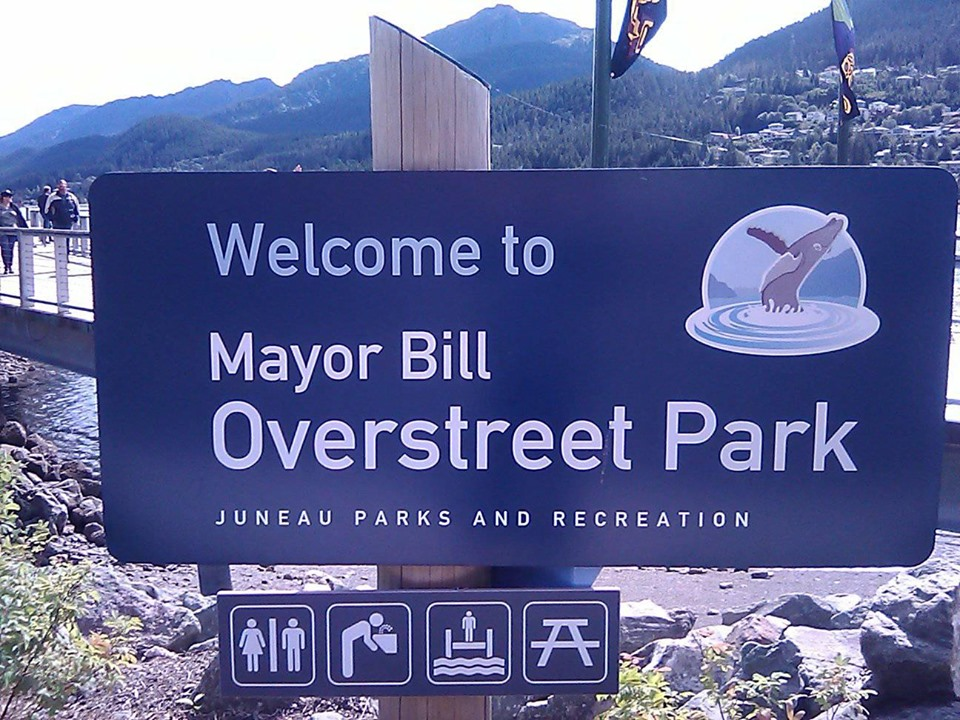
- Welcome sign to the park
- Interactive map of Mayor Bill Overstreet Park
- Type: Beach/urban park
- Location: Juneau, Alaska United States
- Coordinates: 58°17′58″N 134°25′35″W
- Created: 2018
- Operator: City and Borough of Juneau
- Open: All year
- Status: Open

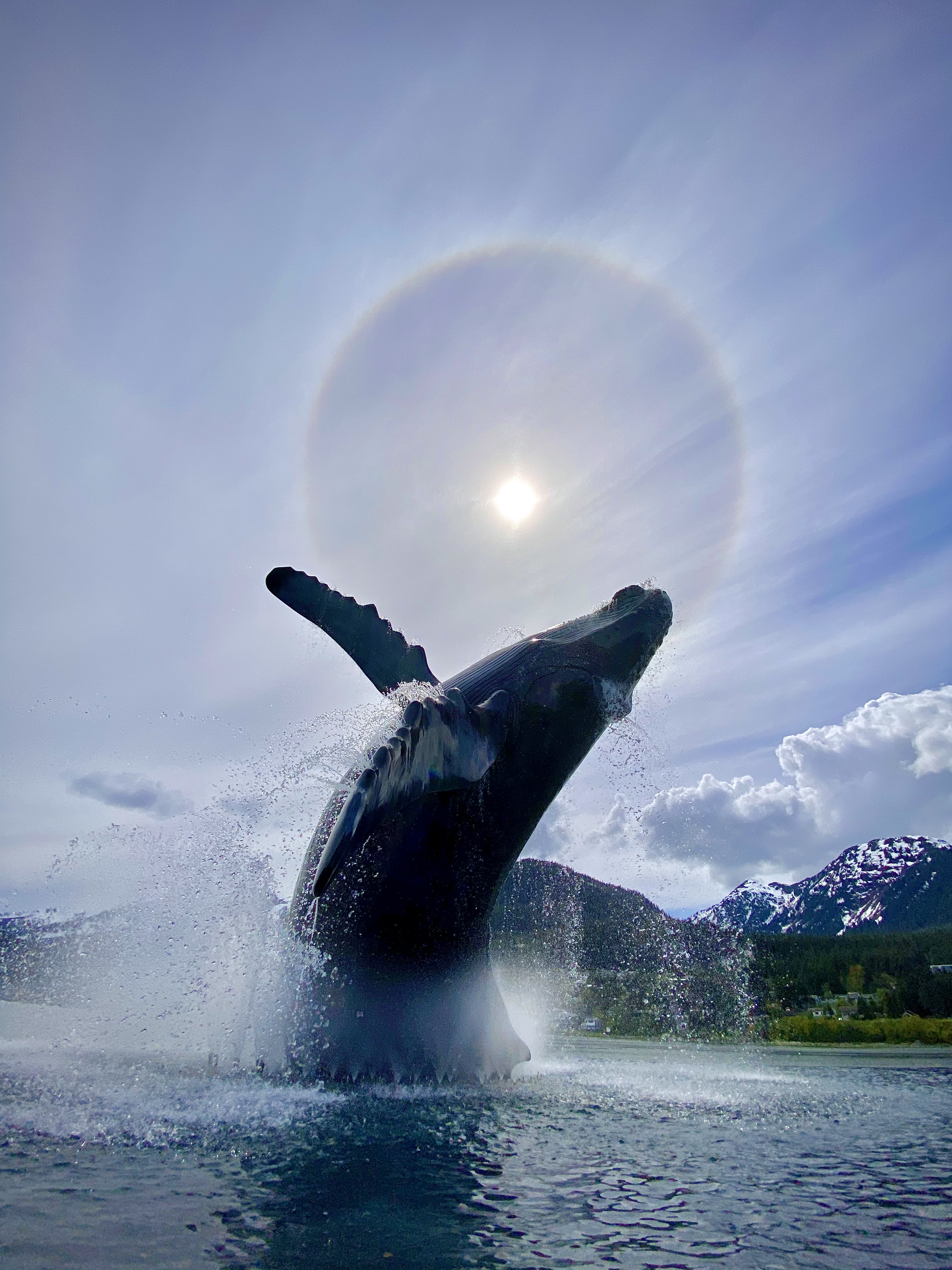
Solar Halo at the Humpback Whale Sculpture in Juneau, Alaska on May 25, 2021.

Mayor Bill Overstreet Park, also known locally as Overstreet Park (or more informally as Whale Park), is a beach and public park, located in the City of Juneau, the state capital of Alaska. The large, waterfront park stretches over half a mile, past two state office buildings. Its most notable feature is a breaching whale sculpture called Takhu, designed by Alaskan artist Skip Wallen and built in Anaheim, California. The sculpture was placed in a fountain, next to the Juneau-Douglas Bridge, overlooking Gastineau Channel. The park is within walking distance of Downtown Juneau, the cruise ship docks and Douglas Island. It was completed in 2018. A system of boardwalks and trails connect Downtown Juneau to the park.

The park is named after Bill Overstreet, a former mayor of Juneau who successfully fought to maintain Juneau as the capital city of Alaska.

== Park amenities ==
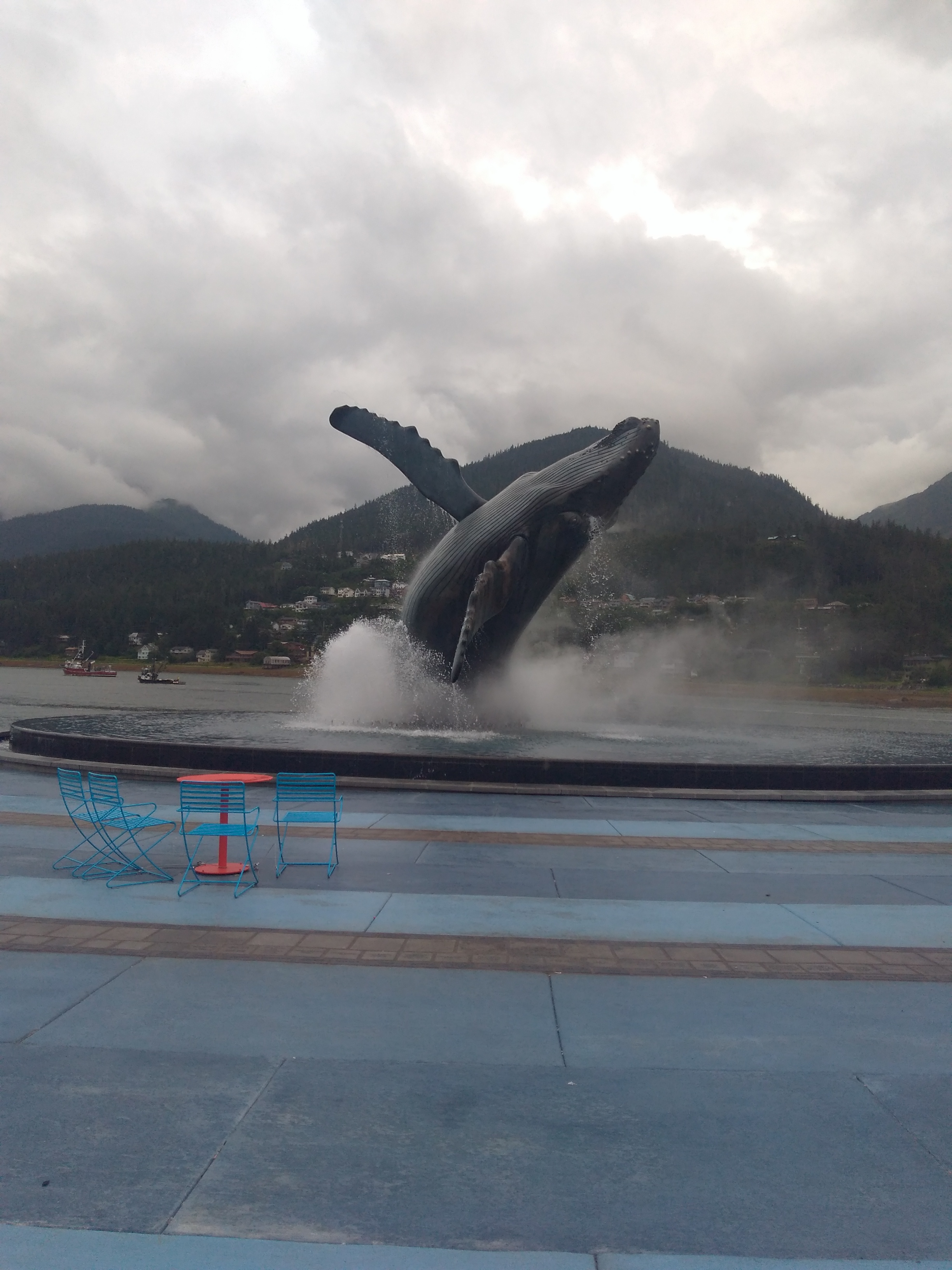
Whale sculpture and fountain in the park

Completed in 2018, the park includes the humpback whale sculpture and fountain, as well as public restrooms, a covered picnic area, benches and tables, and signs to direct tourists who walk over from the nearby cruise ship docks. The park also provides access to the beach.

== Funding ==
Funding for the whale sculpture was provided by private donations. However, controversy arose when the Cruise Lines International Association, (CLIA) alleged that the City and Borough of Juneau (CBJ) "illegally" used "head tax" funds collected from each passenger to partially fund the building of the park itself, which the CLIA maintains violates the tonnage clause of the U.S. Constitution. The CBJ maintains that because the fees are used for the benefit of ships and passengers using the port, and not for the privilege of entering the port itself, they do not violate the Constitution.

In December, 2018, Judge H. Russel Holland issued a ruling that benefited both the CLIA, as well as the CBJ. In his ruling, Judge Holland declared that the CBJ may continue to collect the per-passenger head tax, but must spend the receipts on projects that directly benefit the ship itself, not its passengers. Holland used crossing guards and sidewalk maintenance as two things the city may not spend passenger fees on. Both sides agreed that Judge Holland's ruling means that these funds cannot be used to build, maintain or expand the park. Both the CLIA and CBJ have stated that they will not appeal the ruling.
