= Cropley Lake =

Lake in the state of Alaska, United States

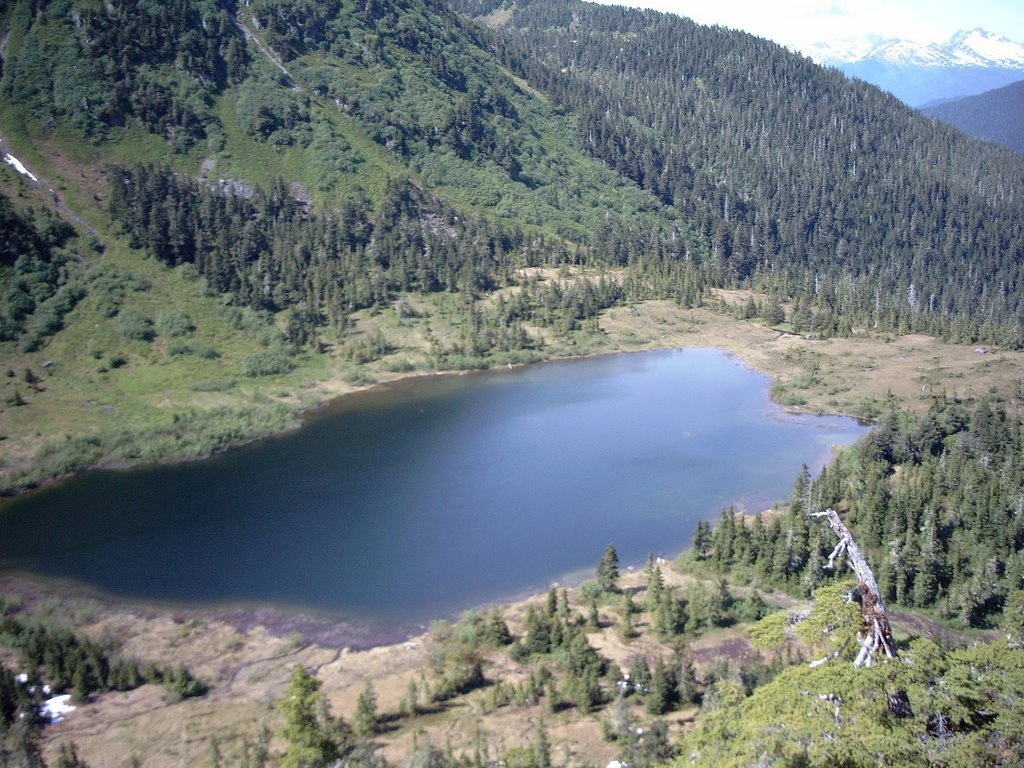

- Location within Alaska Location within North America
- Location: Juneau, Alaska, United States
- Coordinates: 58°15′49″N 134°31′29″W
- Basin countries: United States
- Surface elevation: 553 m (1,814 ft)

Cropley Lake is an alpine lake in the Juneau, Alaska, United States. Located on Douglas Island, it is 2 miles (3.2 km) southwest of Table Top Mountain, and 5 miles (8.0 km) southwest of the city of Juneau. Cropley Lake is the source of Fish Creek.

== History ==
It is named after Isaac Cropley, a miner who worked in the Juneau area from around 1887 until his death in 1913.

In 1975, the Juneau Lions Club built a trail from the Eaglecrest Ski Area to the lake. It was used actively for about ten years, but a lack of maintenance cause the trail to become overgrown. The trail was between 1.5 and 2 miles (2.4 and 3.2 km) long. On June 7, 2010, the Juneau Assembly was to appropriate a $133,180 grant from the Alaska Department of Natural Resources to fund improvements to a nearby trail from the Eaglecrest lodge to a bridge over Fish Creek. Excess funds were to be used to build a new trail to Cropley Lake. Planned improvements to the Eaglecrest Ski Area include a day-use cabin at Cropley Lake. In the 1990s, the ski area used about 218,000 US gallons (830,000 L) of water from the lake every day and a total of about 79,574,000 US gallons (301,220,000 L) per year. The water is used for hydroelectric power generation.

Skiers have had some close run-ins with avalanches near the lake, including in 1987 and on March 1, 2001.

== Wildlife and climate ==
Just below the lake there is a barrier to prevent upstream fish movement. Between June 26 and 27, 2010, Juneau-area scientists conducted a two-day wildlife survey of the Cropley Lake/Fish Creek drainage area. Dolly Varden trout has been noted residing in the lake. The fish in the lake are small, ranging from 6 to 10 inches (15 to 25 cm). A single Clark's nutcracker was seen at the lake on July 5, 1975.

Cropley Lake is located in a cirque. The soil around the shores of the lake consists mainly of muskeg covering till (glacial sediment) above bedrock. Trees on the shore are up to about 400 years old. The lake is naturally dammed but also has two small man-made dams to raise its level.
