= Table Top Mountain (Juneau, Alaska) =

Mountain in Alaska, United States

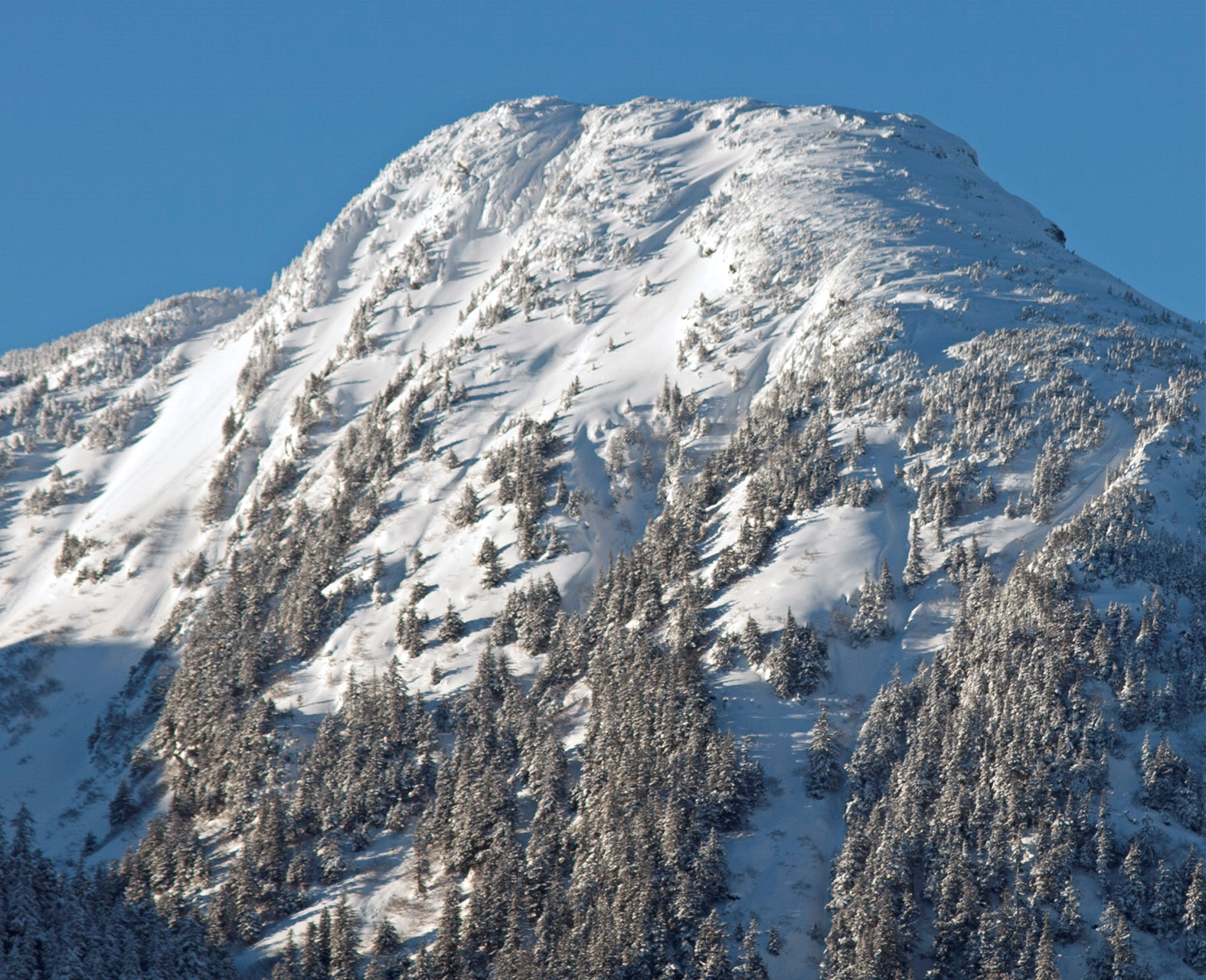
- East aspect seen from Juneau

Highest point
- Elevation: 3,182 ft (970 m)
- Prominence: 1,181 ft (360 m)
- Parent peak: Mount Bradley (Mount Jumbo)
- Coordinates: 58°17′32″N 134°30′05″W

Geography
- Location within Alaska
- Interactive map of Table Top Mountain
- Location: Juneau, Alaska, United States
- Parent range: Boundary Ranges
- Topo map: USGS Juneau B-2

Table Top Mountain is a mountain in the city and borough of Juneau, Alaska, United States. It is a peak of the Boundary Ranges, located on Douglas Island 2 miles (3.2 km) northeast of Cropley Lake and 3.5 miles (5.6 km) west of the city of Juneau.

The United States Geological Survey named the mountain in 1962, and it was entered into the Survey's Geographic Names Information System on March 31, 1981.

== Climate ==
Based on the Köppen climate classification, Table Top Mountain has a subarctic climate with cold, snowy winters, and mild summers. Weather systems coming off the Gulf of Alaska are forced upwards by the Boundary Ranges (orographic lift), causing heavy precipitation in the form of rainfall and snowfall. Temperatures can drop below −20 °C with wind chill factors below −30 °C. The month of July offers the most favorable weather for viewing and climbing Table Top Mountain.

== Gallery ==
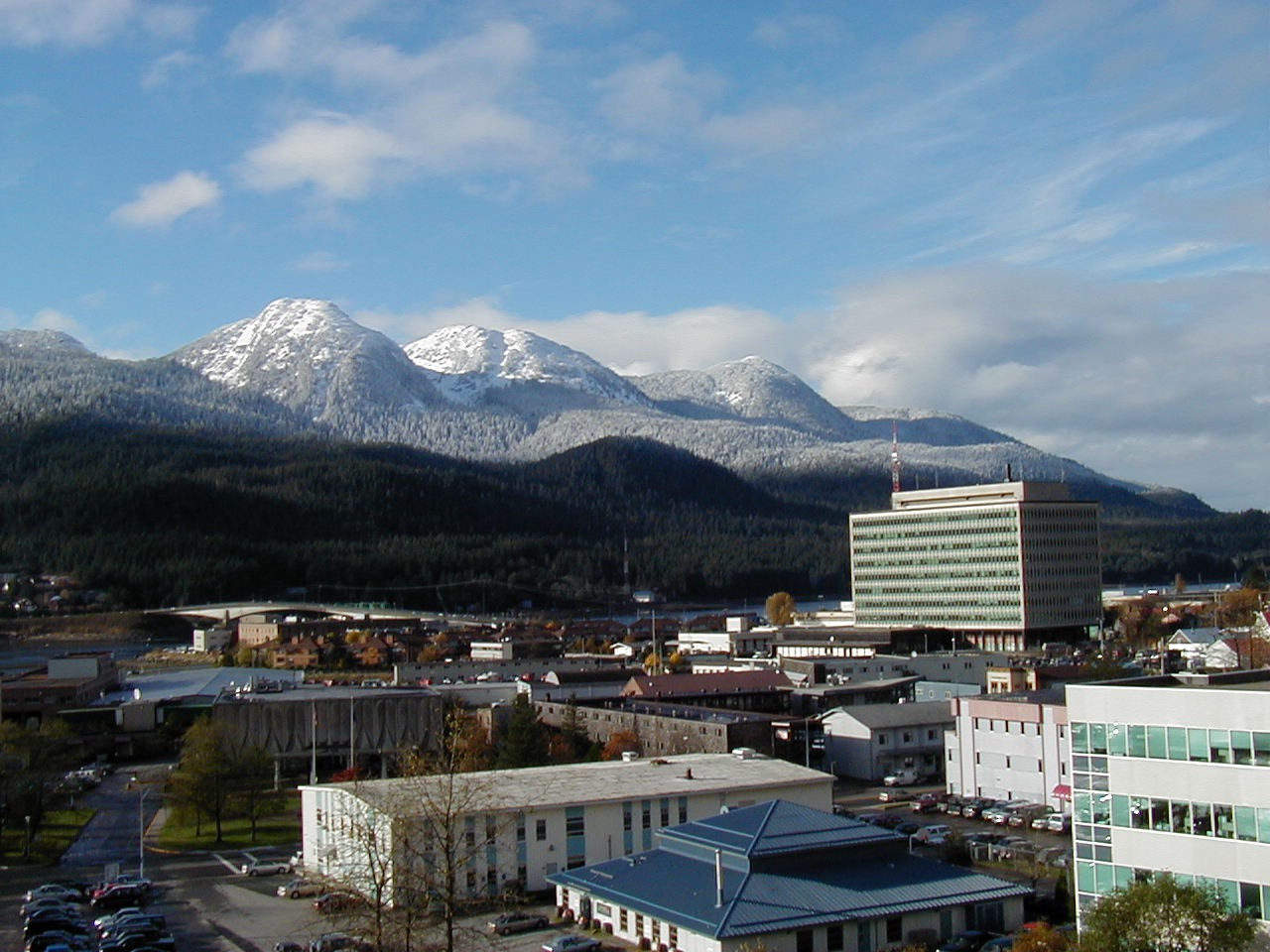
Table Top (left) from Juneau

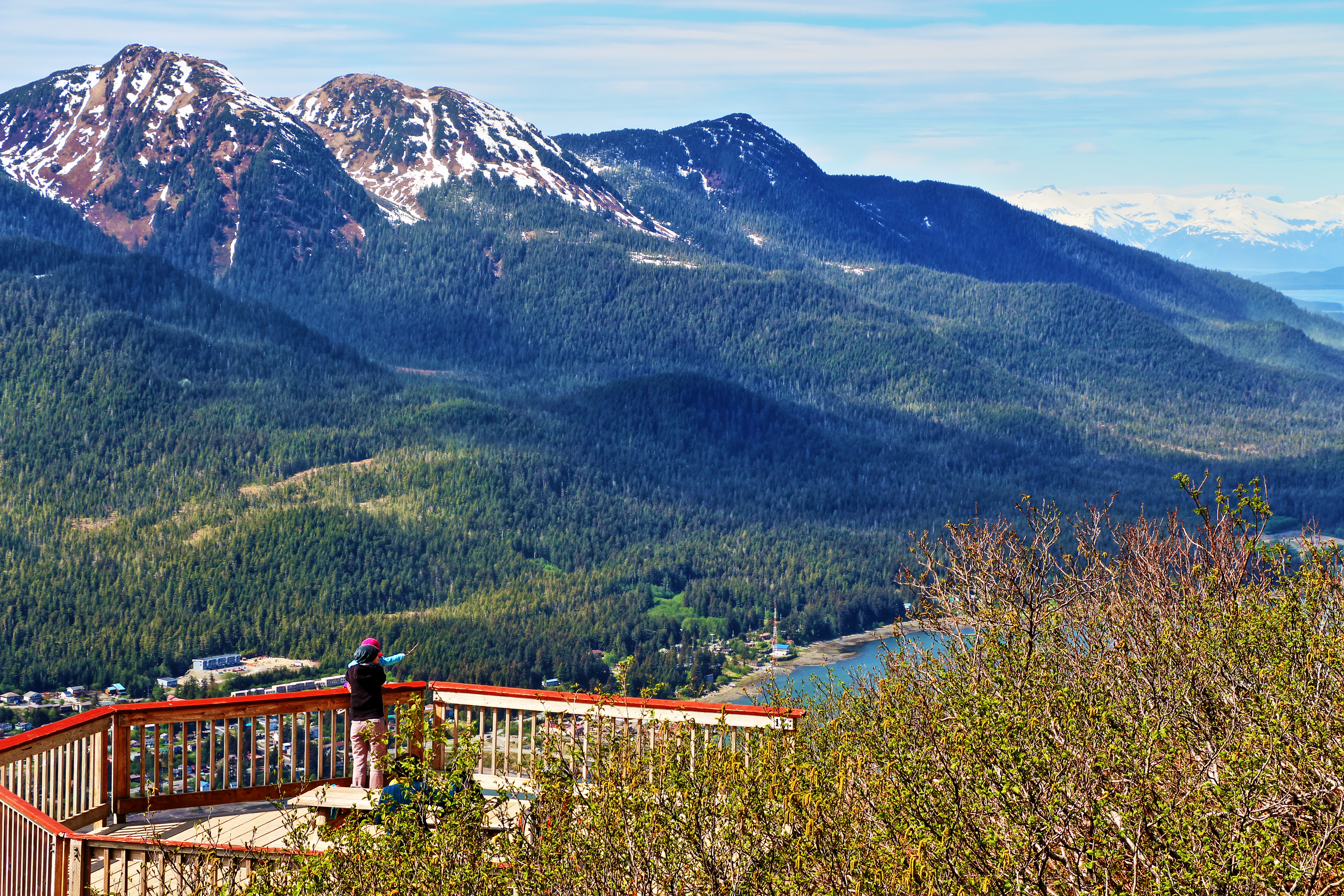
Table Top in upper left corner

== See also ==
- Mount Roberts
