= Douglas Indian Association =

Alaska Native tribe

Douglas Indian Association Anax Yaa Andagan Ye ̴̴ Sayeik (Tlingit)
- Alaska Native village
- Douglas Indian Association
- Coordinates: 58°18′09″N 134°25′26″W
- Constitution Ratified: November 24, 1941; 84 years ago
- Capital: Juneau, Alaska

Government
  - Type: Representative democracy
  - Body: Douglas Tribal Council
  - President: Clarence Laiti

Population (2026)
  - Estimate: 800
- Demonym: Tlingit
- Time zone: UTC– 09:00 (AKST)
  - Summer (DST): UTC– 08:00 (AKDT)
- Website: diataku.com

The Douglas Indian Association is a federally recognized Native American tribe of Inland Tlingit people. This Alaska Native tribe is headquartered in Juneau, Alaska.

They have 800 enrolled citizens. The tribe is also called Taku Native Tribes, and most tribal citizens belong to the T'aaḵu Kwáan, while some belong to the A'akw Kwáan.

== Government ==
The Douglas Indian Association is led by a democratically elected tribal council. Their president is Clarence Laiti. The Alaska Regional Office of the Bureau of Indian Affairs serves the tribe.

The tribe ratified their constitution and corporate charter in 1941. They are served by the Alaska Regional Office of the Bureau of Indian Affairs.

== Territory ==
While the tribe is now headquartered in Juneau, historically its territory included southeast Juneau, Taku Harbor, Taku Inlet, and along the Taku River. In summers, they camped on Douglas Island. Europeans began encroaching on their homelands in the late 19th century.

In the early to mid-20th century, the tribe was based in the Douglas Indian Village. The City of Douglas burned down the village in 1962. In 2024, the City and Borough of Juneau issued an official apology to the tribe for the burning. The Juneau Assembly voted in 2025 to transfer Mayflower Island (Tlingit: X’áat’ T’áak to the tribe. This 3-acre island had been historically used by the tribe for subsistence.

== Economic development ==
The Douglas Indian Association belongs to Goldbelt Inc., an ANCSA Urban Corporation which is part of Sealaska Corporation, an Alaska Native Regional Corporation.

== Language ==
The tribe speaks English and the Tlingit language.

== Arts and culture ==
The people of the Douglas Indian Association create formline design and carve totem poles.
