= Mount Bradley (Mount Jumbo) =

Mountain in Alaska, United States

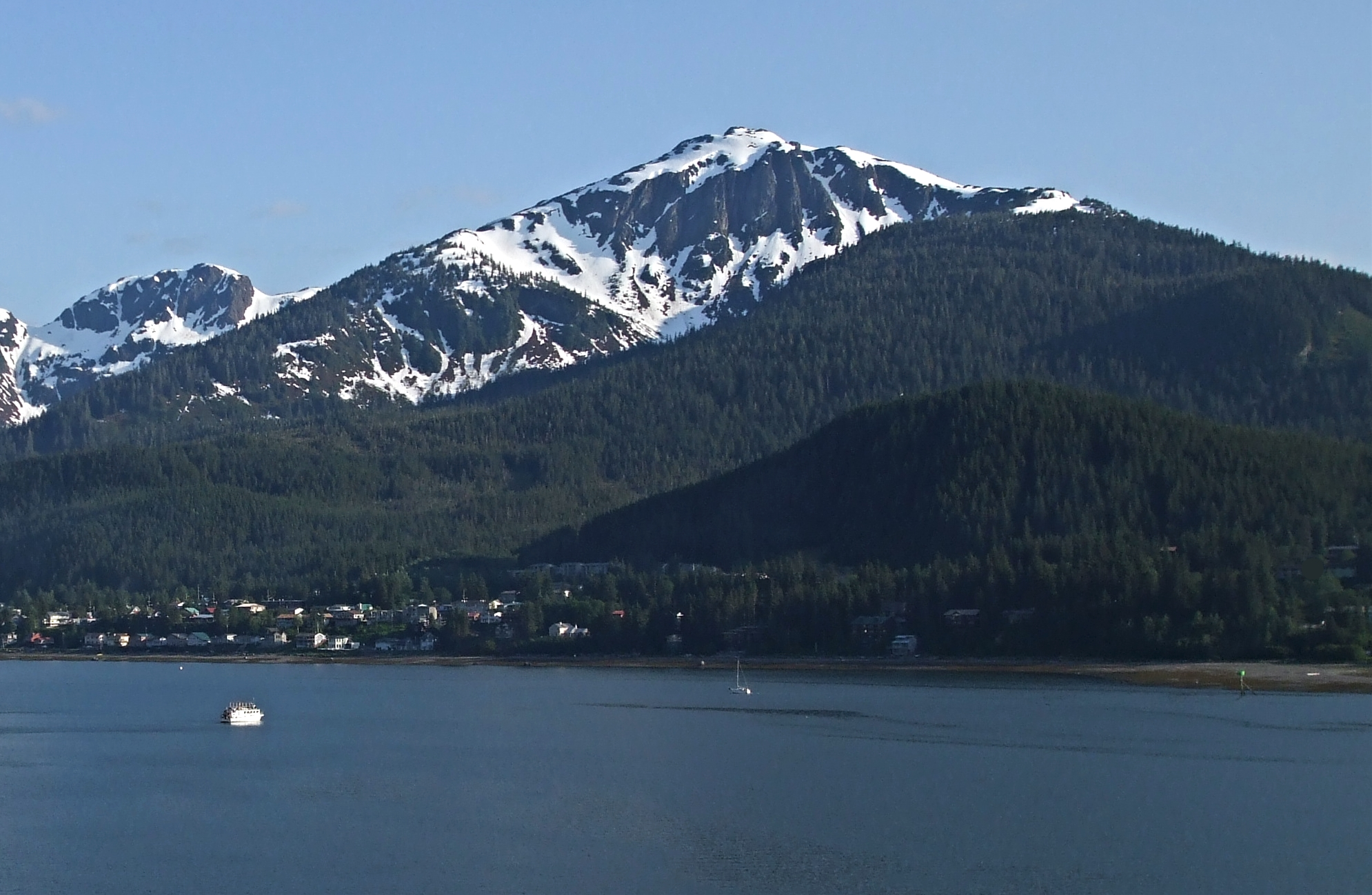
- Mount Bradley, northeast aspect

Highest point
- Elevation: 3,337 ft (1,017 m)
- Prominence: 1,756 ft (535 m)
- Parent peak: Mount Ben Stewart
- Isolation: 3.75 mi (6.04 km)
- Coordinates: 58°14′55″N 134°24′39″W

Geography
- Location within Alaska
- Interactive map of Mount Bradley
- Location: Tongass National Forest; Juneau Borough; Alaska, United States
- Parent range: Alexander Archipelago; Coast Mountains
- Topo map: USGS Juneau A-2

Climbing
- Easiest route: Hiking 2.6 mile trail

Mount Bradley is a 3,337-foot (1,017 m) elevation mountain summit located on Douglas Island in the Alexander Archipelago, in the U.S. state of Alaska. It is the third-highest peak on the island, and is situated 4 mi (6 km) south of Juneau, on land managed by Tongass National Forest. Although modest in elevation, relief is significant since the peak rises up from tidewater of Gastineau Channel in approximately two miles. Its nearest higher neighbor is Mount Ben Stewart, 5.6 mi (9 km) to the northwest.

== History ==
This geographic feature's name was originally published as "Jumbo Mountain" by U.S. Geological Survey in 1904, likely from the Jumbo Mine at its base. Mount Jumbo is another variant name still in common use. It was officially renamed Mount Bradley in 1939 in honor of Frederick Worthen Bradley (1863–1933), world-famous mining engineer. He was president of the American Mining Institute, and in 1931 was awarded the Saunder Gold Medal for outstanding achievement in mining. He was instrumental in developing the quartz mining areas of Gastineau Channel including the Treadwell gold mine and Alaska Juneau Mine, and contributed toward the development of the communities of Juneau and Douglas. This geographic feature's name was officially adopted in 1939 by the U.S. Board on Geographic Names.

== Climate ==
Based on the Köppen climate classification, Mount Bradley has a subarctic climate with cold, snowy winters, and mild summers. Weather systems coming off the Gulf of Alaska are forced upwards by the Coast Mountains (orographic lift), causing heavy precipitation in the form of rainfall and snowfall. Winter temperatures can drop below −20 °C with wind chill factors below −30 °C. This climate supports the Juneau Icefield to the mountain's northeast. The month of July offers the most favorable weather for viewing and climbing Mount Bradley.

== Gallery ==
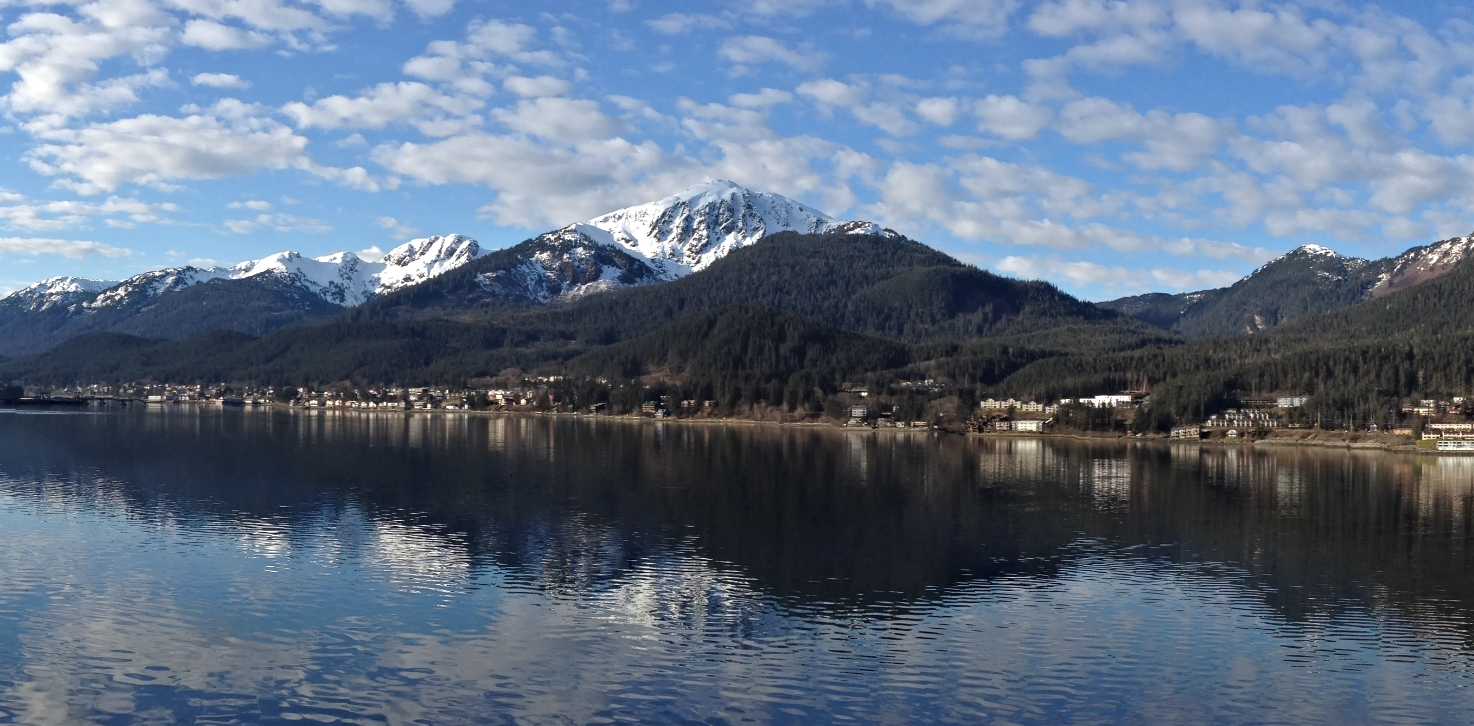
Mount Bradley (aka Jumbo) and Douglas Island seen from Juneau

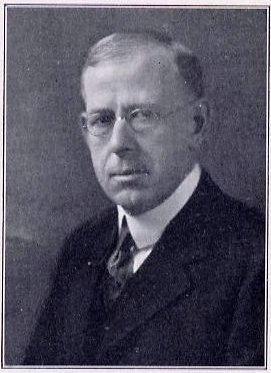
F. W. Bradley

== See also ==
- List of mountain peaks of Alaska
- Geography of Alaska
