= Eleven Mile =

Eleven Mile or Elevenmile may refer to:

- Eleven Mile State Park, in Colorado
- Elevenmile Creek, in Alaska
