= Eaglecrest Ski Area =

Ski area in Alaska, United States

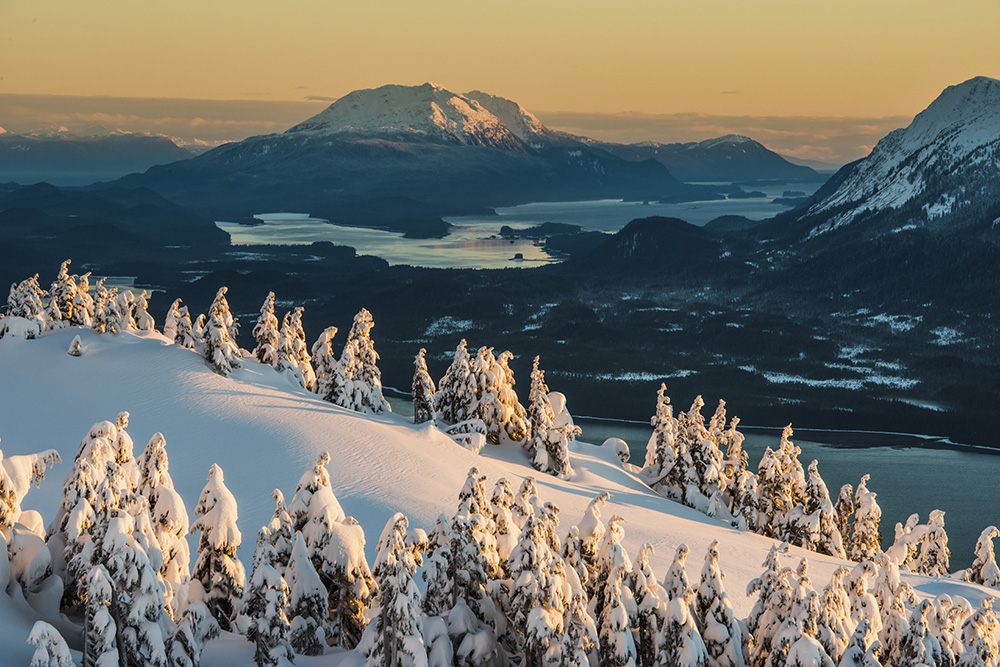
- Seymour Canal From Pittman's Ridge Ocean view from Eaglecrest's West Bowl

- Location in Alaska Eaglecrest Ski Area (North America)
- Location: Douglas Island, Alaska; United States
- Nearest city: Juneau
- Coordinates: 58°16′34″N 134°30′55″W
- Vertical: 1,620 ft (490 m)
- Top elevation: 2750
- Base elevation: 1130
- Skiable area: 640 acres (2.6 km^{2})
- Trails: 36: 20% easiest; 40% more difficult; 40% most difficult
- Longest run: 2 m (6 ft 7 in)
- Lift system: 3 chairs
- Snowfall: 350 in
- Snowmaking: Yes
- Website: Eaglecrest Ski Area

Eaglecrest Ski Area is a public ski area on Douglas Island in the U.S. state of Alaska, across Gastineau Channel from Juneau. The area is owned and operated by Juneau's municipal government. Eaglecrest has 3 double chairlifts accessing 640 acres (2.6 km^{2}), with 36 marked alpine runs, two Nordic skiing loops, and access to world-class backcountry. Vertical drop is 1,620 ft (490 m) with an average snowfall of 320" and a record snowfall of 640" in 2011.

Southeast Alaska's only ski area, Eaglecrest's season generally runs from the first weekend of December through mid-April.

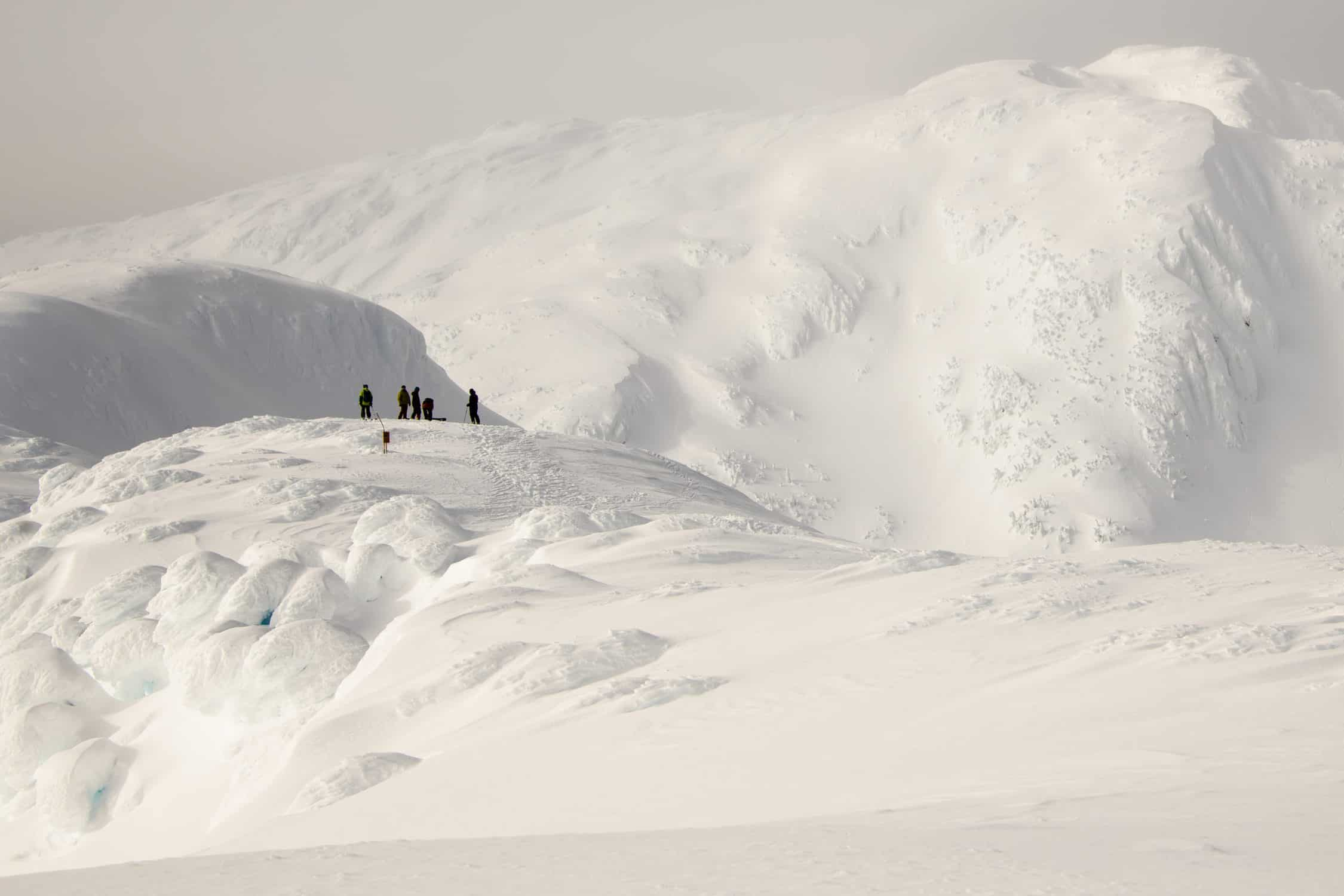
Pittman's Ridge with Mt Ben Stewart in the background

Eaglecrest is family and community-oriented, with many community outreach programs available, including a snowsports school offering lessons to students with physical and learning disabilities.

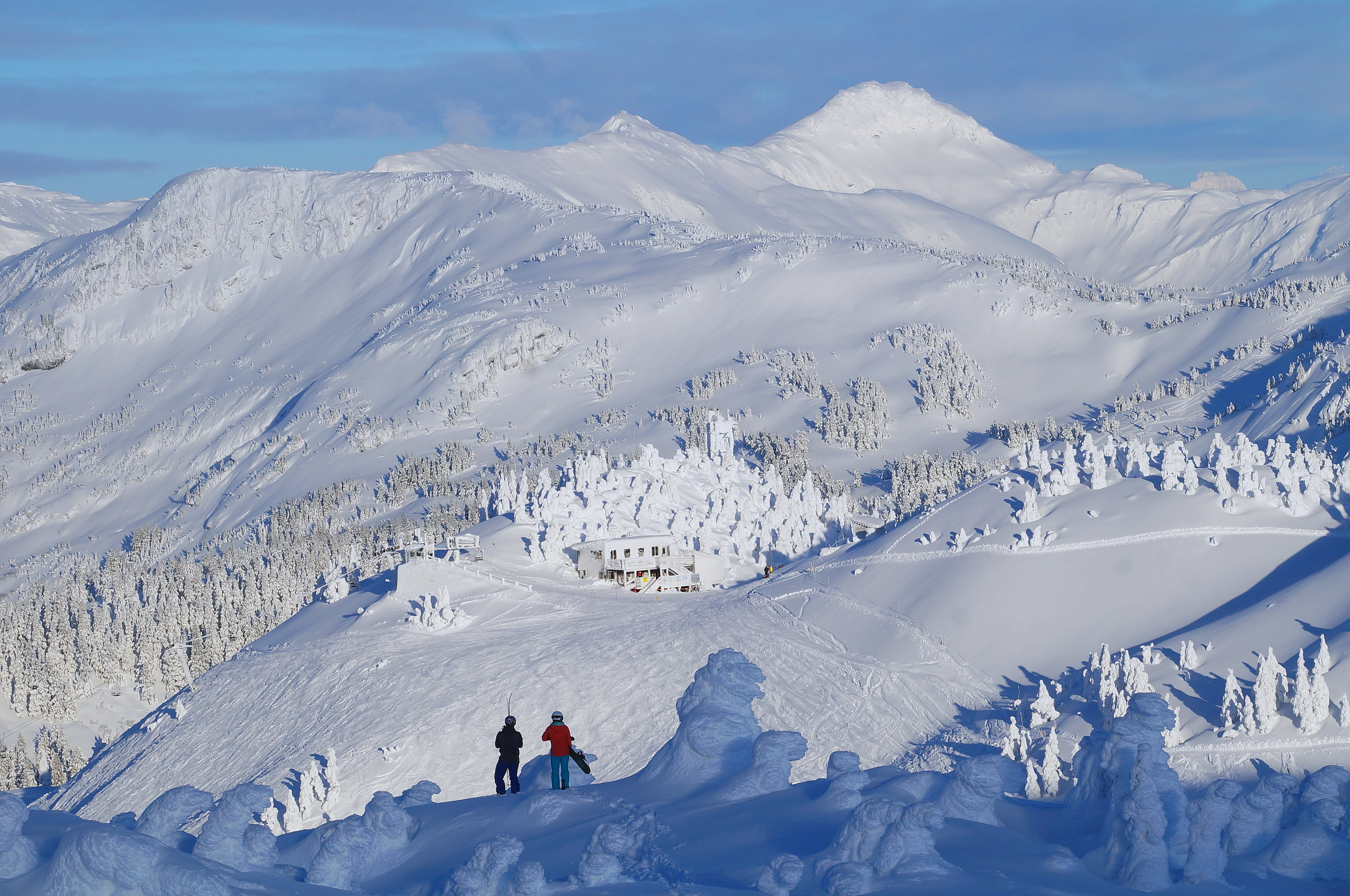
Northeast view from Pittman's Ridge

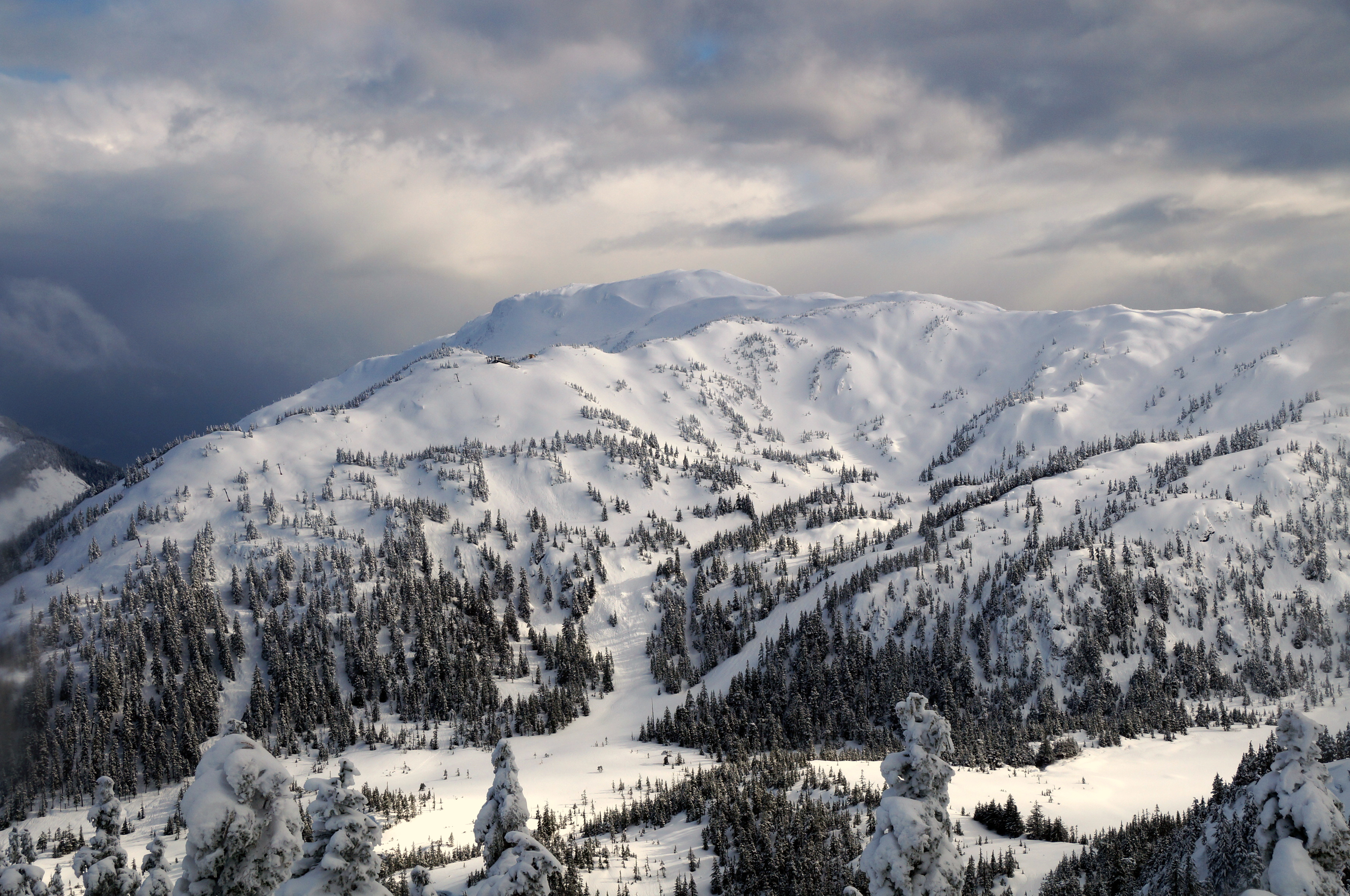
The west side terrain at Eaglecrest Ski Area

Eaglecrest now has 36 official alpine runs to go with East & West Bowls, Pittman's Ridge, Hilda & Benches Glades, and 8 km of Nordic trails. When snow and staffing allow, the mountain offers a terrain park.
