= Douglas, Juneau, Alaska =

Douglas
- Subcommunity, former incorporated city
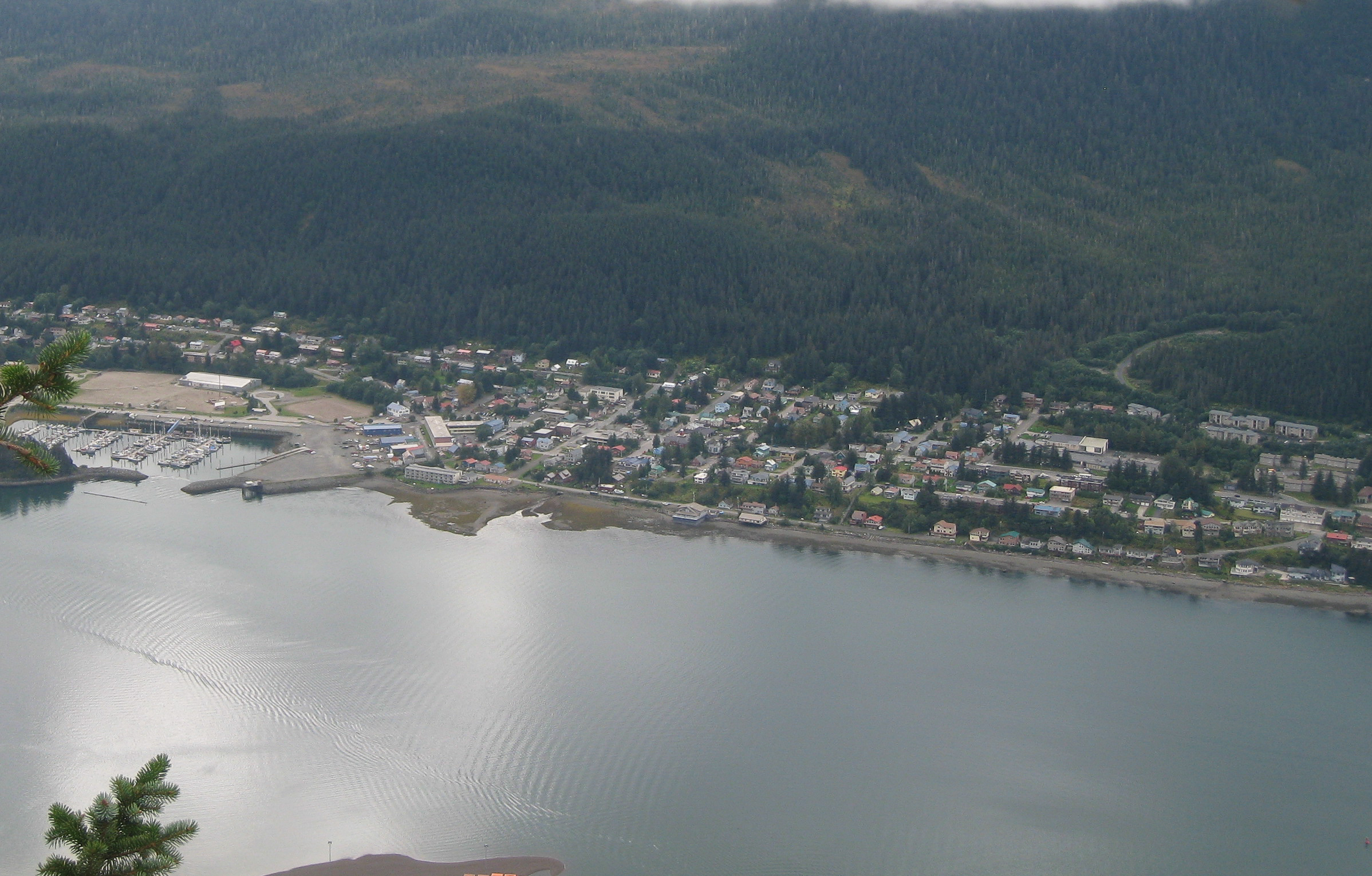
- Overhead view of the Douglas townsite from the Mount Roberts Tramway, August 2010

- Location of Douglas in Alaska
- Coordinates: 58°16′32″N 134°23′35″W
- Country: United States
- State: Alaska
- Municipality: Juneau
- Founded: 1881
- Incorporated: March 29, 1902
- Incorporation dissolved: July 1, 1970

Government
  - Type: Part of unified home rule municipality
  - Body: Assembly
  - Mayor: Beth Weldon
  - State senator: Jesse Kiehl (D)
  - State rep.: Sara Hannan (D)

Population
  - Estimate (2011): 3,000
- ZIP Code: 99824
- Area code: 907

Douglas (Tlingit: Sayéik) is a community on Douglas Island in southeastern Alaska, directly across the Gastineau Channel from downtown Juneau.

== History ==
Douglas Island was originally a border of the Auke people’s and Taku people’s territory. It was not usually used for year-round settlement, but rather as a place to spend the summer, or at times a place for battles.

Some historical reports indicate an early settler to the area may be credited for the naming of Douglas Island.

In 1880 gold was discovered in Juneau, Alaska, across the narrow Gastineau Channel, drawing in all kinds of people looking to strike it rich. In 1881 two towns sprouted up on Douglas Island: Treadwell and Douglas. Treadwell was the community for the miners, with its own entertainment, pool, and bar. Douglas, too, had businesses popping up and soon had its own school and post office. A railroad and boardwalk connected the two towns. At this time the Treadwell power plant was large enough to power the entire Treadwell area, Douglas, and Juneau. The power plant continued to serve the Alaska-Juneau Gold Mine until the mine was shut down in 1944 by the War Department as non-essential to the war effort.

1887, Douglas Island Friends Mission School established to forcefully assimilate Indigenous Alaska Native peoples into Western European culture.

1902, Douglas Island Friends Mission School Closed. This site later became a dairy farm

In 1902, the city of Douglas was incorporated. The town sustained significant damage on March 9, 1911, when a fire started in the Douglas Grill. It took the Douglas, Treadwell, and Juneau fire departments working together to stop the entire town from being destroyed.

The towns of Douglas and Treadwell underwent changes after the 1917 cave-in of the Treadwell mine. While one section still operated until 1926, Treadwell shrank and Douglas became the town of Douglas Island.

Douglas continued to have its own dairy (Douglas Dairy, owned by Joe Kendler) until 1923 when it moved across the channel. At this time, there was a regular ferry between the towns of Juneau and Douglas.

On October 10, 1927, another great fire ripped through Downtown Douglas once again, demolishing part of the abandoned Treadwell Mine, the Downtown commercial district and the Native Village.

In 1935, the Douglas Bridge was opened and made transportation between the island and Juneau simpler.

On February 23, 1937, the city of Douglas again experienced a devastating fire, with 600 of the 700 residents losing their homes. However, Douglas rebuilt and restarted.

On March 8, 1955, the city voted to combine schools with the city of Juneau, resulting in the construction of Juneau-Douglas High School, which continues to serve the area's students.

May 1962, Douglas City Council burned the Tlingit Indian Village of Douglas, Anax̱ Ya Andagan Yé (Where Sunlight Touches First).

In a controversial moment in 1970, voters in the cities of Douglas and Juneau, and of the surrounding Greater Juneau Borough, elected to unify their respective governments, forming the present-day City and Borough of Juneau.

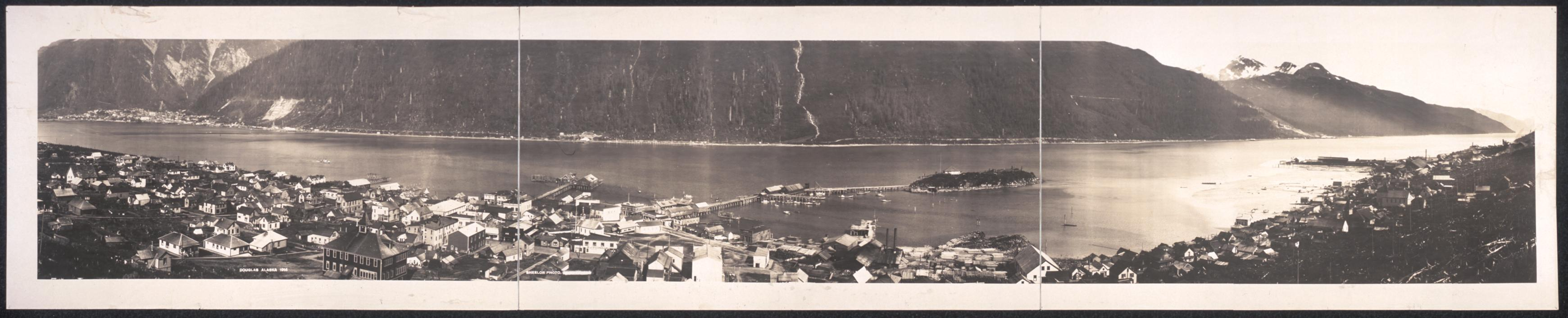
Panoramic photograph of Douglas, taken in 1914.
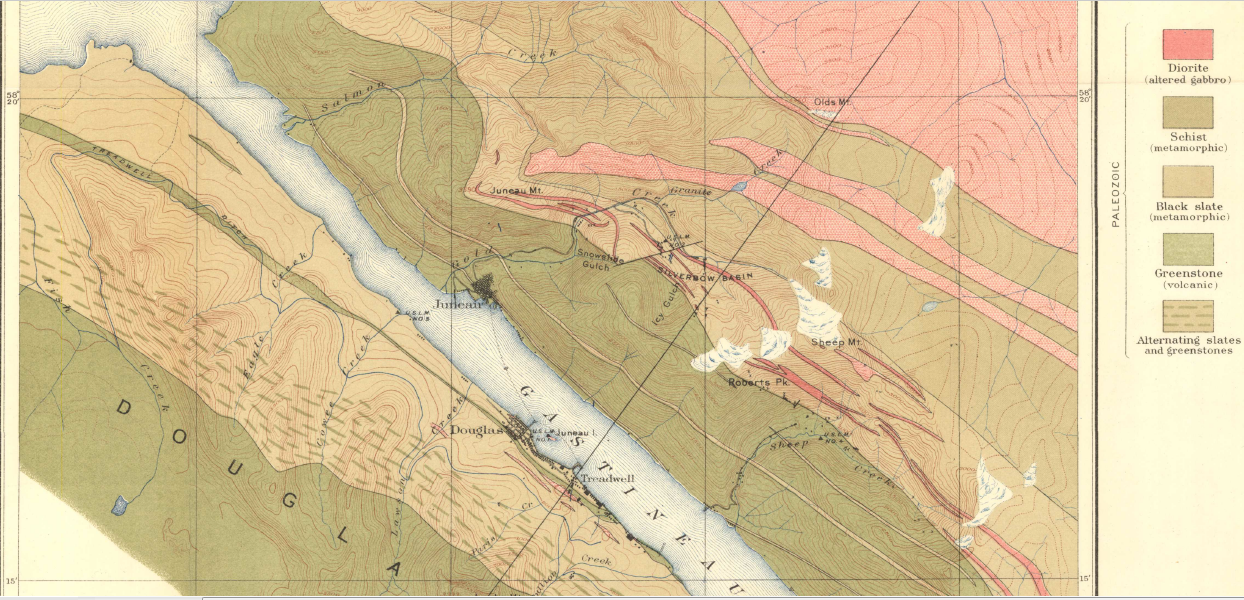
Geological map showing the locations of Douglas and Treadwell.

== Demographics ==
Historical population
Year	Pop.	±%
1890	402	—
1900	825	+105.2%
1910	1,722	+108.7%
1920	919	−46.6%
1930	593	−35.5%
1940	522	−12.0%
1950	699	+33.9%
1960	1,042	+49.1%
1970	1,243	+19.3%
Source: "Census of Population and Housing". United States Census Bureau. Archived from the original on October 1, 2013. Absorbed into Juneau, Alaska, 1970

Douglas first appeared on the 1890 U.S. Census as "Douglas City." Despite its name, it was still an unincorporated community. It appeared as Douglas in 1900 and formally incorporated in 1902. In 1970, voters in the city of Douglas and Juneau Division approved a merger with the city and borough of Juneau.

In 1890, Douglas was the 11th largest community in Alaska with 402 residents. Of those, 356 were White, 26 were Native, 17 were Creole (Mixed Russian & Native), 2 were Asian and 1 was Other.

In 1900, Douglas was the 7th largest community in Alaska with 825 residents. It did not report a racial breakdown.

In 1910, Douglas was the 3rd largest city in Alaska with 1,722 residents (exceeding neighboring Juneau, which was in 4th place with 1,644 residents and 6th placed Treadwell on the south border of Douglas with 1,222 residents). It reported 1,344 Whites, 346 Natives and 32 others. Had all three locales been unified as they are today, they would've been the most populous locale that year with 4,588 residents, exceeding Fairbanks (3,541) as the largest city.

In 1920, Douglas fell to 7th place (919); in 1930 it was at 11th (593); in 1940 it was at 18th (522); in 1950 it was at 20th (699); in 1960 it was at 23rd (1,042); and in 1970 it was at 29th (1,243).

== Infrastructure ==
The only traditional school left in Douglas is Gastineau Elementary, operated by the Juneau School District, which serves all of Douglas Island's elementary-aged students. The Douglas Public Library is part of the Juneau Public Library System. Douglas has a small commercial core with several restaurants and bars, a gas station and the Perseverance Theatre, Alaska's only professional theater company. The town's population has dropped over the years but recently is up to about 3,000 people, or close to ten percent of the City and Borough of Juneau's population. Douglas gets its water and electricity from Juneau and has a mix of onsite and municipal (diverted to Juneau) wastewater treatment.

The Alaska Department of Corrections has its headquarters in Douglas.

== See also ==
- Douglas Harbor
- List of mayors of Juneau, Alaska § Mayors of the City of Douglas, Alaska (1902–1970)
- Mayflower School (Juneau, Alaska)
- Perseverance Theatre
