= Fish Creek (Douglas Island, Juneau, Alaska) =

Coordinates: 58°19′50″N 134°35′43″W

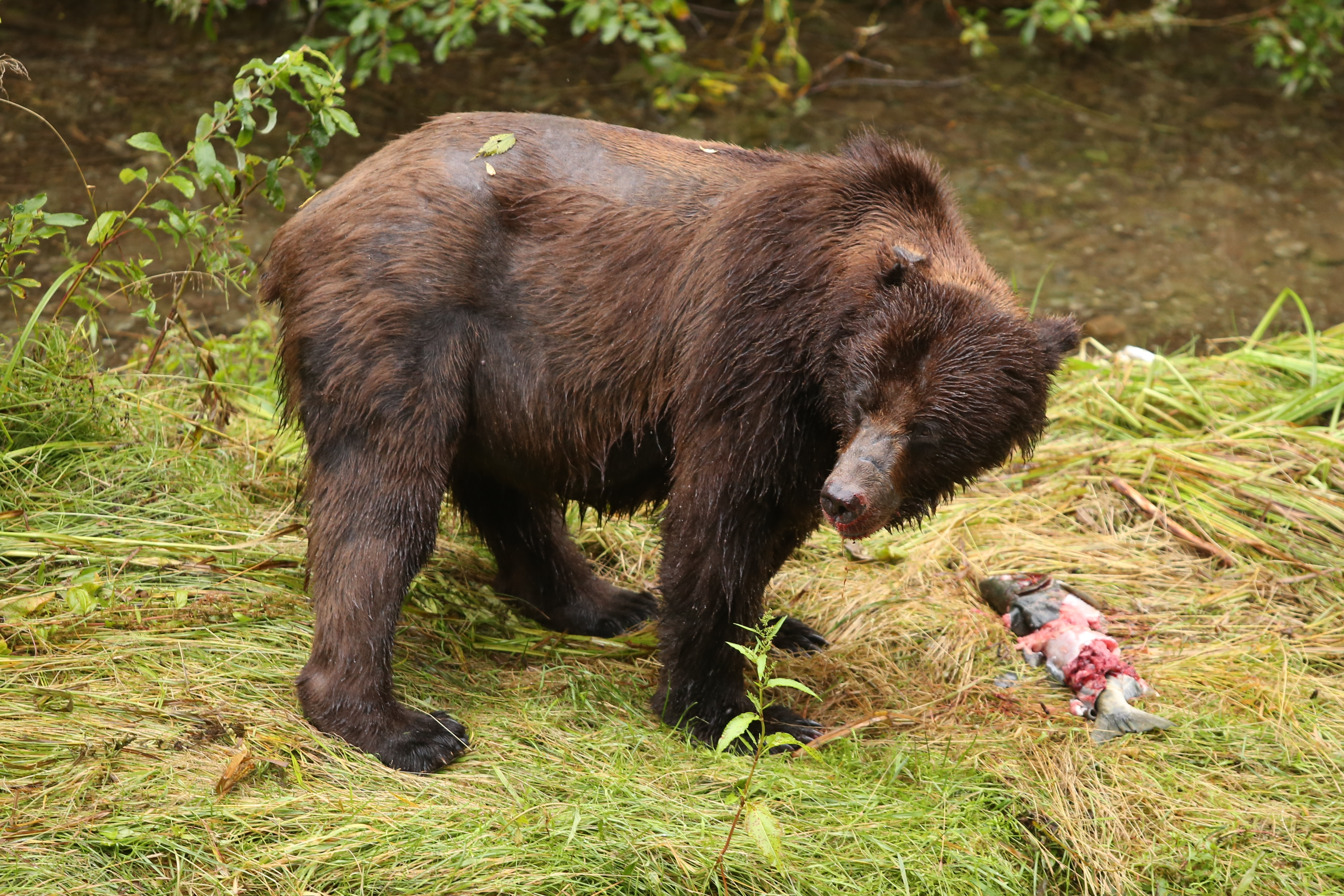
- Grizzly bear at Fish Creek in Hyder, Alaska.

- Location within Alaska Location within North America

Location
- Country: United States
- State: Alaska

Physical characteristics
- Source
  - location: Cropley Lake, Douglas Island
- Mouth
  - location: Fritz Cove, Stephens Passage
  - coordinates
  - elevation: 26 ft (7.9 m)

Fish Creek is a river on Douglas Island in the City and Borough of Juneau, Alaska, United States. Its origin is Cropley Lake, and it flows into Fritz Cove, a part of Stephens Passage. It is 7 miles (11 km) northwest of the city of Juneau.

The Treadwell gold mine used water from Fish Creek as early as 1885. The Treadwell Ditch, constructed in 1889, brought water sixteen miles from the river to the mines.

American dippers were noted nesting near the river in May 2010.

Fish Creek also refers to a historical settlement at the mouth of the stream. Homestead claims were filed in 1880, and a school was established in 1936.

== See also ==
- List of rivers of Alaska
