= West Juneau, Alaska =

Coordinates: 58°17′42″N 134°25′46″W

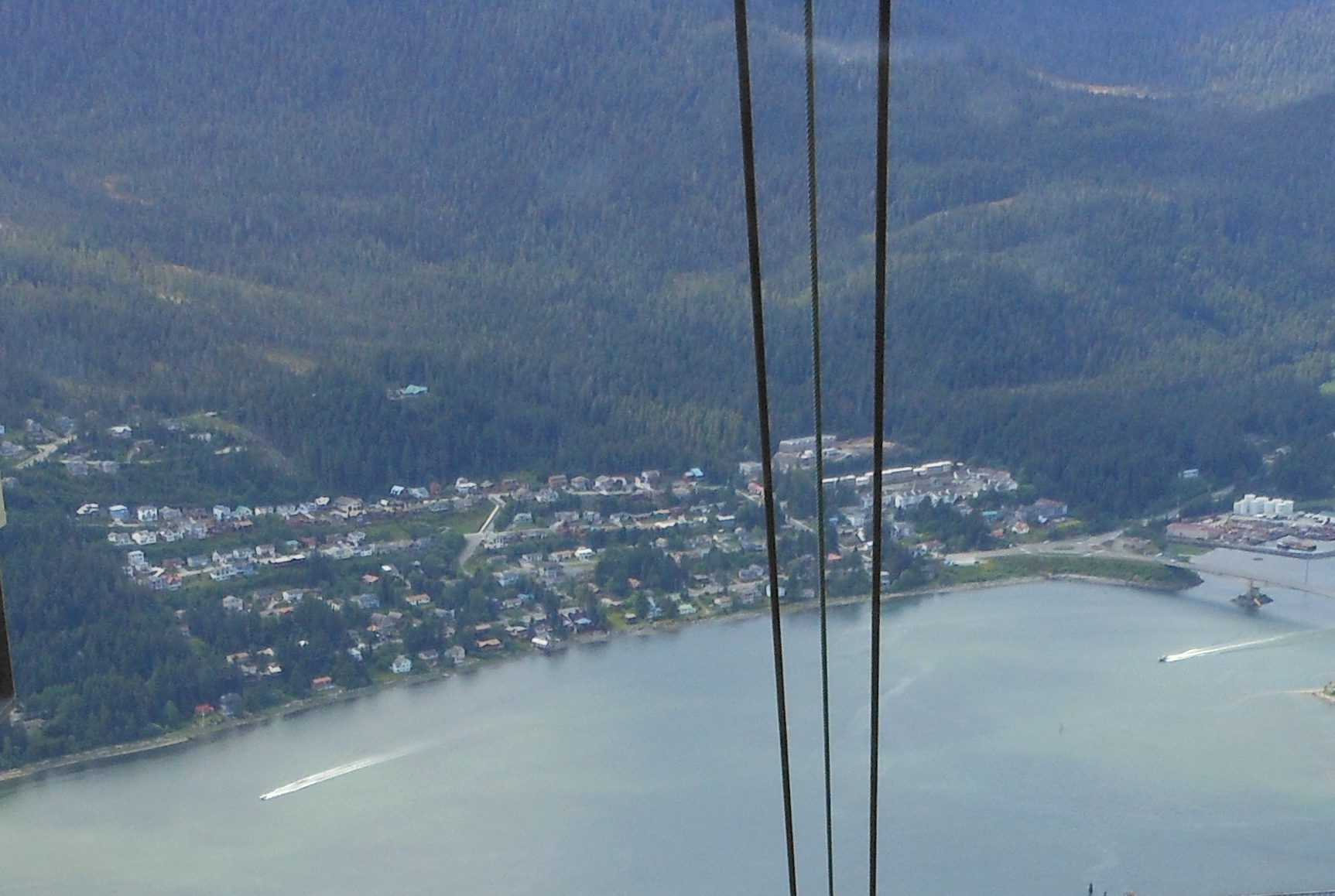
West Juneau in this 2013 view from the Mount Roberts Tramway.

West Juneau is a populated place in Juneau, Alaska, United States. It is located on Douglas Island 1.8 miles (2.9 km) northwest of Douglas. Despite its location on Douglas Island, the neighborhood was juridically a part of the City of Juneau, rather than the City of Douglas, prior to municipal unification in 1970.

The area is predominantly residential, with minor marine-related industrial uses occurring along the shoreline. There are a number of large condominium developments and a public housing project, with the remainder of the residences being primarily single-family. The neighborhood previously had a grocery store, until it was removed to make way for a roundabout at the Douglas Island end of the Juneau-Douglas Bridge.
