= Taku Harbor =

Taku Harbor S'iknáx̱saankʼi
- Seasonal community
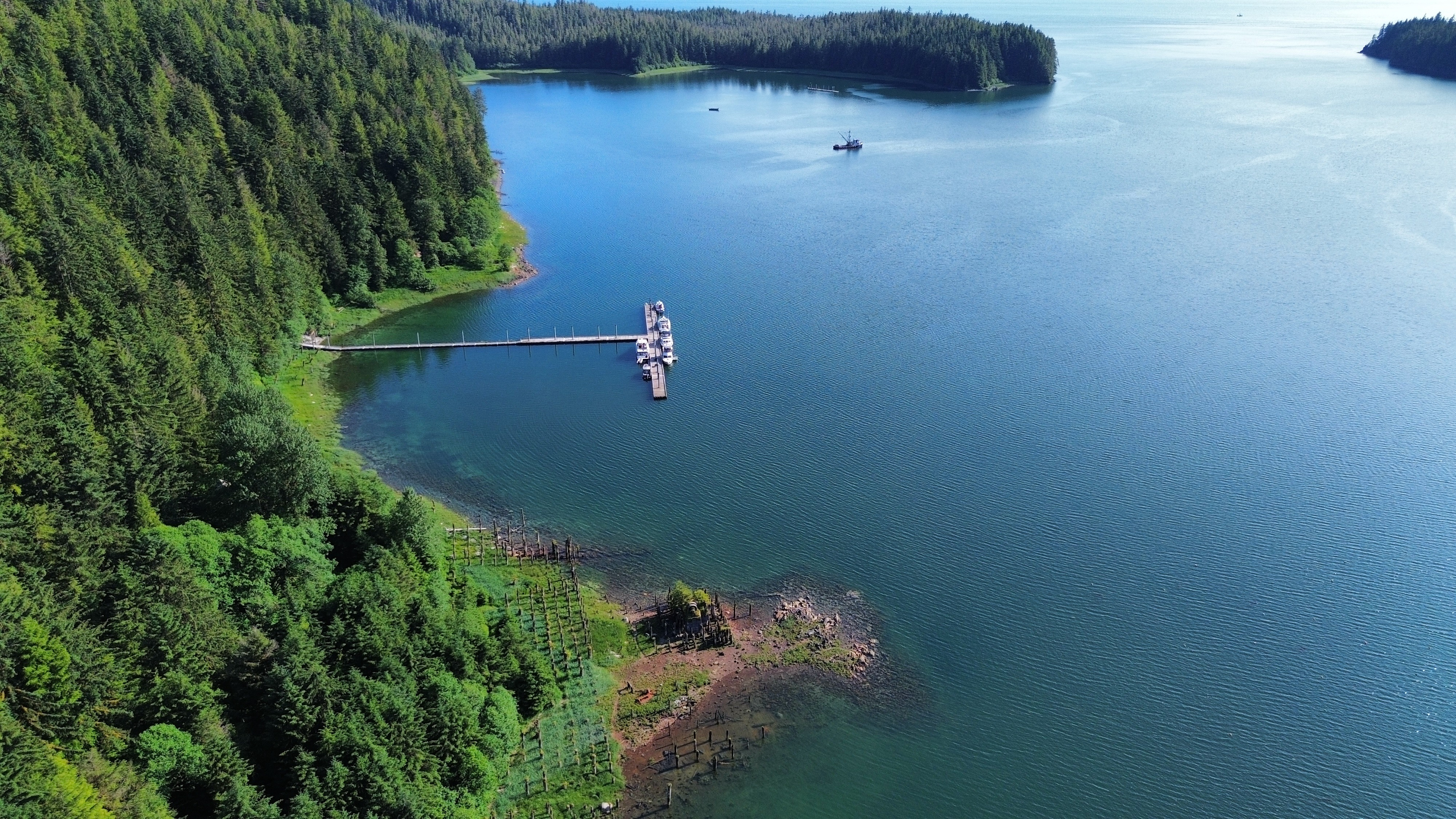
- Taku Harbor: public dock & cannery ruins.

- Location in Alaska
- Coordinates: 58°04′04″N 134°01′11″W
- Country: United States
- State: Alaska
- Census Area: Juneau

Population (1880)--No year-round residents since 1980s--
  - Total: 269
- Time zone: UTC-9 (Alaska (AKST))
  - Summer (DST): UTC-8 (AKDT)

Taku Harbor (Lingít: S'iknáx̱saankʼi) is a sheltered bay located about 22 miles (35 km) southeast of central Juneau, Alaska, United States. With proximity to the Taku River, the harbor served as important center of trade for the Taku people, as a Hudson's Bay Company trading post, and salmon cannery. Currently nearly all of the harbor is part of the Taku Harbor State Marine Park. There are no current year-round residents.

== History ==
=== T'aaku Kwáan ===
Taku Harbor is named after the Taku Tlingit people and is part T'aakú Kwáan lands which extend into the interior (British Columbia, Canada) and south to Tracy Arm and Gambier Bay. Taku Harbor (S'iknax̱'saankʼí, "Little one below the black bear community") and surrounding areas were used for fishing, hunting, and trapping. Tlingit petroglyphs, likely carved in the region around 8000 years ago, are present south of the harbor mouth.

In the 1800s, the principal villages of the Taku Tlingit moved south to participate in trade including formation of a village, Sik'nax̱sáani, in Taku Harbor with two tribal houses. In the 1880s, a school and church were built in the northeastern shore of the harbor. The opening of gold mines in nearby Juneau contributed to migration of the Taku Tlingit out of Taku Harbor. However, a community remained, contributing to the large scale salmon harvest and canning operation in the harbor.

=== Fort Durham ===
Under an agreement with the Russian American Company, Hudson's Bay Company constructed Fort Durham in Taku Harbor as a trading post in 1840. Situated on the northern aspect of the harbor, the 150-feet square trading post had 18 foot tall wood fortifications and two eight-sided corner bastions. This location is now a National Historic Landmark. The trading post engaged the Taku Tlingit to in trade directly and as intermediaries with tribes in the interior (current day British Columbia and Yukon, Canada). Workforce, which included some enslaved people, included French Canadians, Hawaiians, and Native Alaskans. The fort was not as profitable as expected and closed in 1943 in favor of a ship-based trade. However, the community of Taku Tlingit built near the fort remained for a period and the US Census taken in 1880 provided a population count of 269. The fort and community around it has subsequently been fully reforested without substantial evidence of its prior history.

=== Salmon harvest and processing ===
The San Juan Fishing & Packing Company started salmon processing in the 1901 in Taku Harbor at a prominence on the northwestern aspect of the harbor. In 1901, the operation was sold to Pacific Cold Storage Company who established the first cold-storage plant in Alaska at the site. The facility was subsequent leased and then sold to John L. Carlson Company. In 1918, the cannery was sold to Libby, McNeil, and Libby who then ran and expanded the facility through large fires in 1919 and 1931. The cannery and cold storage was final closed in 1947 and disassembled in 1951.

=== Libby, McNeil, and Libby ===
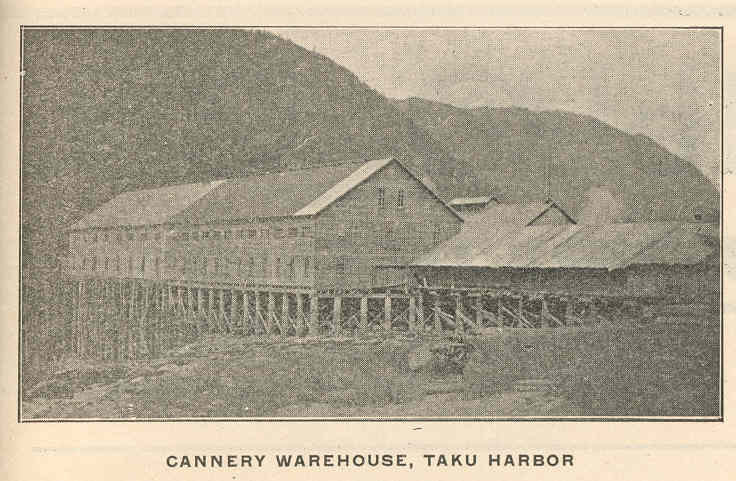
Pacific Cold Storage in Taku Harbor (c1906)

Libby, McNeil, and Libby purchased cannery.

== See also ==
- Taku Harbor Seaplane Base
- Taku Harbor State Marine Park
