= Auke =

Subgroup of Tlingit Alaska Natives

The Auke are a subgroup of the Tlingit, an Alaskan Native people, whose autonym Aakʼw Ḵwáan means "Small Lake People." The Auke lived along the northwestern coast of North America, in the area that is now the Alexander Archipelago and adjoining mainland of the Alaska Panhandle around Juneau.

The Auke had a village on Auke Bay just east of Point Louisa, about 13 miles northwest of Juneau. There were seasonal festivals associated with the harvest of herring at spawning season.

Some Auke Tlingit are enrolled in the Douglas Indian Association, a federally recognized tribe headquartered in Juneau.

== History ==
In 1880, after Joe Juneau and Richard Harris were led to gold in the Silver Bow Basin, U.S. naval officers encouraged the Auke to move from the area to avoid conflict with miners and prospectors. The census of Alaska at the time listed the Auke population as 640, of whom 300 were on Admiralty Island, 50 on Douglas Island, and 290 on Stephens Passage, the latter presumably including those at the Point Louisa village.

The Auke people continued to return to what they called Indian Point, for the annual harvest of herring at spawning time. They have considered this a sacred place, both because of their traditional gathering for subsistence and their historic village and its burying ground.

The Auke have resisted European-American development of Indian Point, which is located past the Juneau Ferry Terminal and before the Auke Recreation Area operated by the U.S. Forest Service. Federal agencies including the National Park Service and the National Oceanic and Atmospheric Administration (NOAA) had proposals to build on the site. The Tlingit consider it sacred territory, both because of the burying ground and its place in their traditions of gathering sustenance. The city and state supported recognition of the 78-acre site, which in August 2016 was listed on the National Register of Historic Places. "It is the first traditional cultural property in Southeast Alaska to be placed on the register."

== Clans and houses ==
The Auke were originally formed around clans, based on kinship systems. These were traditionally divided into houses. Extended family groups used to live together in large longhouses.

=== Divisions and houses of the Raven Moiety or Clan ===
- Lʼeeneidí (Gift Blanket People)
  - G̱aatáa Hít (Trap House)
  - Téelʼ Hít (Dog Salmon House)
  - Yax̱te Hít (Big Dipper House)
- Lʼuknax̱.ádi (Coho Salmon People)
  - Lʼook Hít (Coho Salmon House)
- G̱aanax̱.ádi (People of G̱aanax̱)
  - G̱aanax̱aa Hít (G̱aanax̱ Group House)
  - Yéil Hít (Raven House)

=== Divisions and houses of the Wolf/Eagle Clan ===
- Wooshkeetaan
  - G̱unakadeit Hít (Sea Monster House)
  - Hít Tlein (Big House)
  - Noow Hít (Fort House)
  - Tóosʼ Hít (Shark House)
  - Xeitl Hít (Thunder/Thunderbird House)
  - Xóots Hít (Brown Bear House)
