= Juneau–Douglas Bridge =

Bridge in Alaska, USA

Douglas Bridge
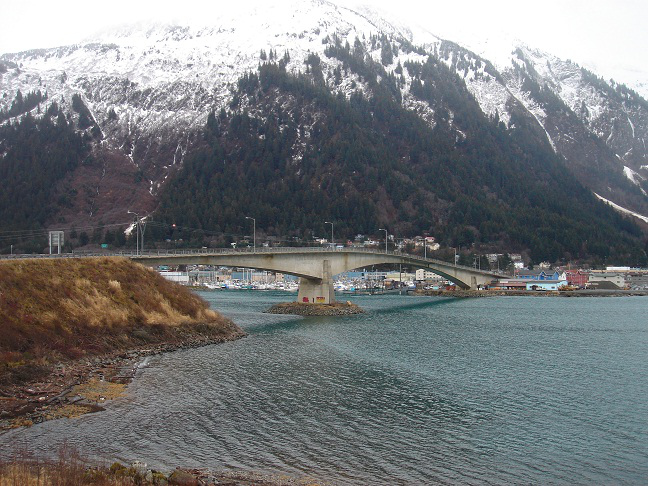
- Coordinates: 58°17′56″N 134°25′44″W
- Carries: 2 lanes of West 10th Street, pedestrians and bicycles
- Crosses: Gastineau Channel
- Locale: Juneau, Alaska

Characteristics
- Design: Girder bridge
- Total length: 189 metres (620 ft)
- Height: 20.2 metres (66 ft)

History
- Opened: 1980

Statistics
- Toll: None

Location
- Interactive map of Douglas Bridge

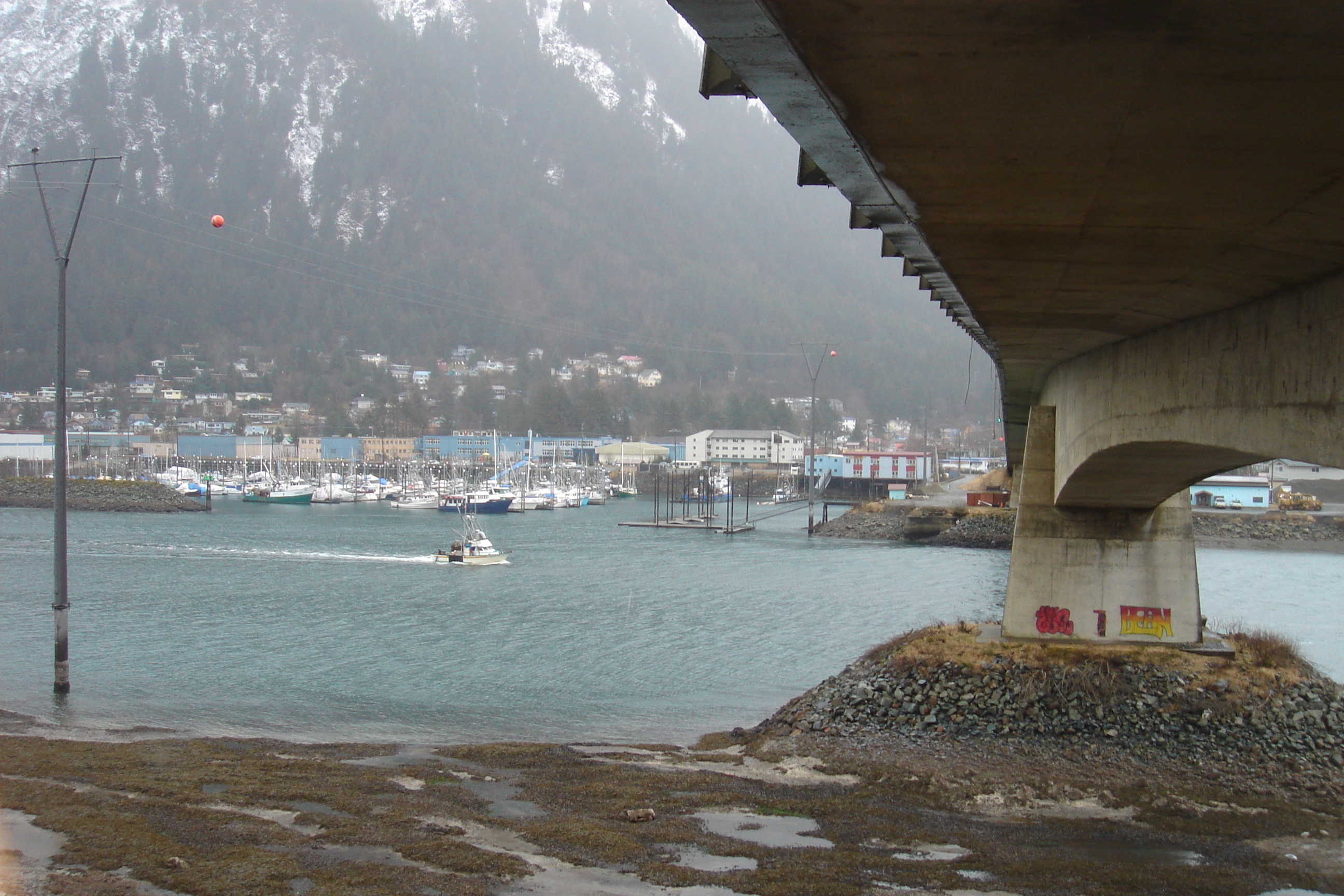
Photo taken below the bridge, facing east from Douglas Island, shows the bridge's superstructure and support column above Gastineau Channel.

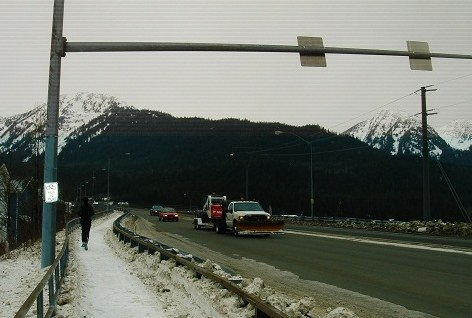
A jogger heads west up the bike path toward Douglas Island as traffic approaches mainland Juneau, as seen from the mainland side.

The Douglas Bridge (also colloquially known as the J. D. Bridge or simply "the bridge") is located in Juneau, Alaska, United States. Spanning the Gastineau Channel, it connects Juneau's eastern, mainland side with the city's communities on Douglas Island to the west. The current span is the second bridge of the same name; the original, built in 1935, was demolished in 1981 following the completion of its replacement in 1980.

The bridge is the only roadway link to the communities on Douglas Island: Douglas, North Douglas and West Juneau, the latter of which is situated at the bridge's western terminus. Egan Drive, Juneau's principal arterial highway, and the bridge are connected at the intersection of Egan and 10th Street, one of the busiest intersections in Southeast Alaska. The current bridge provides a two lane road which accommodates vehicular and pedestrian traffic, as well as a bike path.

== History ==
Though strong currents occur at times under the bridge, prior to construction of the original bridge, residents of Douglas Island would row across the channel to reach the mainland.

The 1935 bridge, of cantilever steel truss design, underwent construction from both sides of the channel. The Civil Works Administration and the Public Works Administration provided grants and loans to assist with construction costs. Its opening was celebrated on October 13, 1935. In 1975, construction began on a new girder bridge and it was completed in 1980. The following year, the old bridge was demolished. For a time, the two bridges stood side by side.

A 2006 Alaska Department of Transportation & Public Facilities project included some bridge joint and pavement improvements, as well as a recommendation to add a reversible center lane. Seeking a solution to relieve traffic on the existing bridge, the CBJ has identified a need for a North Douglas Crossing of the channel as a top transportation priority for Juneau.

== Structure ==
The deck of the newer bridge was constructed using prestressed concrete. It measures 20.2 metres (66 ft) in width, and has a span of 189 metres (620 ft).

== Waterway ==
At zero tide, the Douglas Bridge is 66.4 feet (20.2 m) above the waterline. A spring Dolly Varden fishery is situated directly beneath the bridge. The bridge forms a "no wake zone" on its north side.
