= Mount Bradley (Flathead County, Montana) =

Mountain in Montana, United States

Coordinates: 48.1687464°N 113.4593874°W

Mount Bradley is a summit in the U.S. state of Montana. The elevation is 7,342 feet (2,238 m).

Mount Bradley was named after Richard Bradley, a local ranger.
