= Perseverance Theatre =

Coordinates: 58°16′36″N 134°23′40″W

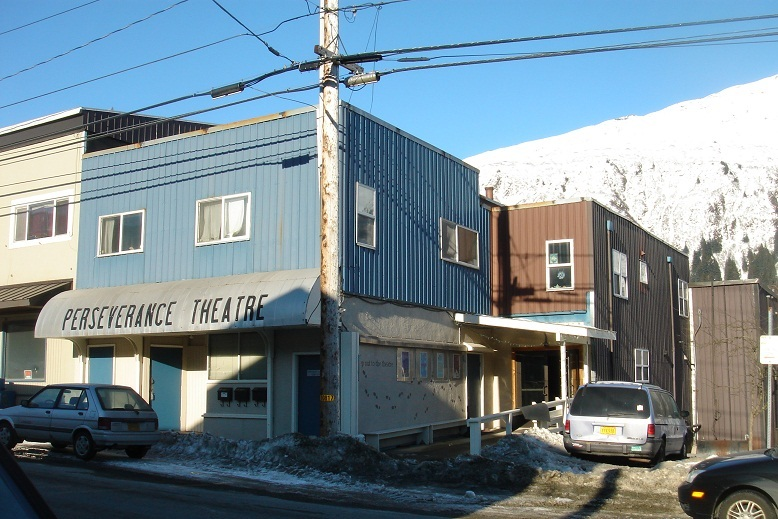
Perseverance Theatre on Douglas Island, on preview night of Oscar Wilde's The Importance of Being Earnest 2011

Perseverance Theatre is a professional theater company located on Douglas Island in Juneau, Alaska. It is Alaska's only professional theater and is particularly dedicated to developing and working with Alaskan artists and to producing plays celebrating Alaskan culture, history, and themes.

Perseverance Theatre was founded in 1979 by Molly Smith. She developed it as an important not-for-profit regional theater that collaborated with leading theater artists. It has premiered more than 50 new plays by Alaskan and national playwrights. Paula Vogel’s 1998 Pulitzer Prize-winning play How I Learned To Drive was written and developed while Vogel was an artist-in-residence with the company.

Smith served as artistic director from the theater's founding until 1998, when she left to become artistic director of the Arena Stage in Washington, D.C. She was succeeded by Peter DuBois, who served until the fall of 2003. He was appointed Associate Producer, then the Resident Director, at the Public Theater in New York City. In July 2008, DuBois became Artistic Director of Boston's Huntington Theatre.

In 2004, PJ Paparelli became Artistic Director of Perseverance Theatre. He left in November 2007, to lead the American Theatre Company in Chicago.

Art Rotch served as Executive Artistic Director from 2008-2019. Rotch is a Perseverance alumnus who earned an M.F.A. in set design at NYU's Tisch School of the Arts. In 2018 Art Rotch was joined by Managing Director Joshua Midget.

The current Artistic Director is Leslie Ishii

Perseverance produces a full season of plays from September to May on its 138-seat Mainstage. Readings, as well as productions generated by the theatre's educational programs, are also regularly produced in the Phoenix, the theatre smaller rehearsal space. In 2012 Perseverance Theatre began performing its full season in Anchorage. For the summer of 2014 Perseverance created a summer series in downtown Juneau called Summerfest.

In 2001, Perseverance Theatre signed an agreement with the University of Alaska Southeast to assume responsibility for all theater education activities at the University, offering theater minors to its students. In December 2002, the theatre was one of just seven American companies to receive a $500,000 endowment challenge grant from the Doris Duke Charitable Foundation in New York through its Leading National Theatres Program. The company successfully completed the challenge in 2005. The theatre also recently raised $1.1 million for a facility renovation and expansion project.

Perseverance Theatre participates in the National Playwright Residency Program (NPRP) from the Andrew W. Mellon Foundation and HowlRound Theatre Commons. In 2016, Vera Starbard began a three-year term as the Playwright in Residence (in cohort 2) and her grant was renewed in 2019 (cohort 3). Her play, "Devilfish" was written and performed during her first term.

== Mainstage ==
An example of the range of productions mounted by the theatre on its Mainstage can be seen in the list of shows from the 2006-07 season:

- Hamlet, by William Shakespeare, directed by PJ Paparelli.
- Noises Off, by Michael Frayn, directed by Keith Baxter.
- The world premiere of Raven Odyssey, by Ishmael C. Hope and PJ Paparelli, directed by Rubén Polendo. A dramatization of Alaska Native stories about the mythical figure of Raven.
- Macbeth, by Shakespeare, translated into the Tlingit language by Johnny Marks, conceived and directed by Anita Maynard-Losh. An Alaska Native-influenced production, performed by an all-Alaska Native cast, largely in the Tlingit language.
- "The Who's Tommy," music and lyrics by Pete Townshend, book by Pete Townshend and Des McAnuff, directed by PJ Paparelli.
- Equus, by Peter Shaffer, directed by PJ Paparelli.

From the 2007-08 Season:

- Yeast Nation, Music and Lyrics by Mark Hollmann, Lyrics and Book by Greg Kotis, directed by PJ Paparelli.

== Second stage ==
The theatre's Second Stage features more intimate productions and the work of developing actors, directors, and designers. The 2006 - 07 Second Stage season included:

- Red Light Winter, written by Adam Rapp, directed by Jaime Castaneda.
- Speech And Debate, written by Stephen Karam, directed by David Charles Goyette.
- A Question Of Mercy, written by David Rabe, directed by Brandon Demery.
- Translation: A 31-Year-Old Woman's Strange Journey Toward Herself, written by Sarah Brooks, directed by John Leo.
- Dog Sees God: Confessions of a Teenage Blockhead, written by Bert V. Royal, directed by David Charles Goyette. Performed at the University of Alaska Southeast, featuring students from the University's "Acting II" class.
- The Typographer's Dream, written by Adam Bock, directed by Jesse Morgan Young.
- The Last Five Years, written by Jason Robert Brown, directed by Colin Høvde.

Perseverance Theatre's "Young Company" performs on the Second Stage.

- A Christmas Carol, written by Charles Dickens, directed by Shona Strausser.
