= Douglas Harbor =

Coordinates: 58°16′37″N 134°23′08″W

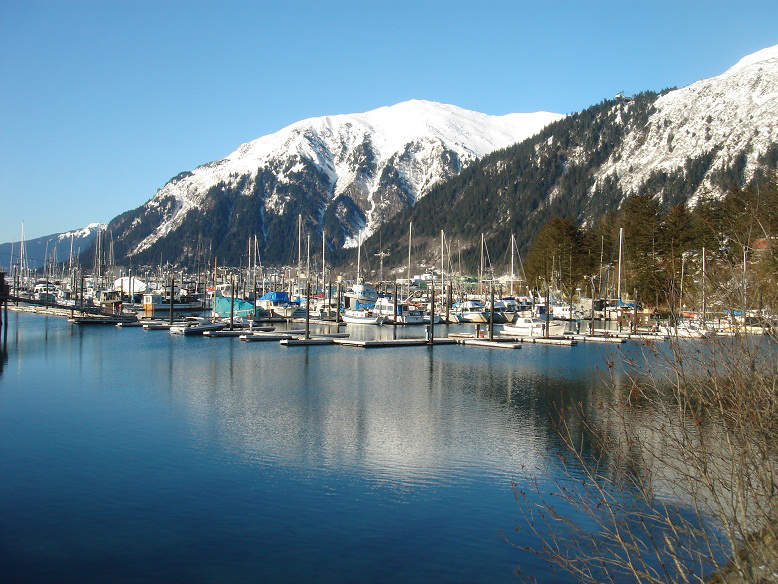
Douglas Harbor in, Douglas, Alaska The island in the midground, right, houses a US Coast Guard station. Mount Juneau lies in the background behind the Coast Guard island

Douglas Harbor is a harbor off the coast of Douglas Island in Juneau, Alaska.

In the 2002 regular election, Juneau-area voters approved the issue and sale of bonds totaling $15 million for improving the borough's harbors, utilities, and parks systems. $7.1 million was allocated for the harbors, including Douglas.

In January 2009, winter weather caused a boat in the harbor to sink.

== See also ==
- Douglas, Alaska
