= Mount Bradley (Siskiyou County, California) =

Mountain in California, United States

- Location within California

Highest point
- Elevation: 5,563 ft (1,696 m) NAVD 88
- Prominence: 283 ft (86 m)
- Coordinates: 41°13′19″N 122°18′32″W

Geography
- Location: Siskiyou County, California, U.S.
- Topo map: USGS Dunsmuir

Mount Bradley is a summit in Siskiyou County, California, in the United States. It is in the Shasta–Trinity National Forest with an elevation of 5,563 feet (1,696 m). The peak rises over 3,000 feet (900 m) above City of Dunsmuir, California and the Sacramento River.

Though it is entirely surrounded by private land, the summit, which is the site of Forest Service lookout tower, can be reached by way of the Castle Lake Trail.
