= Taku people =

Subdivision of the Tlingit people of Alaska

Taku
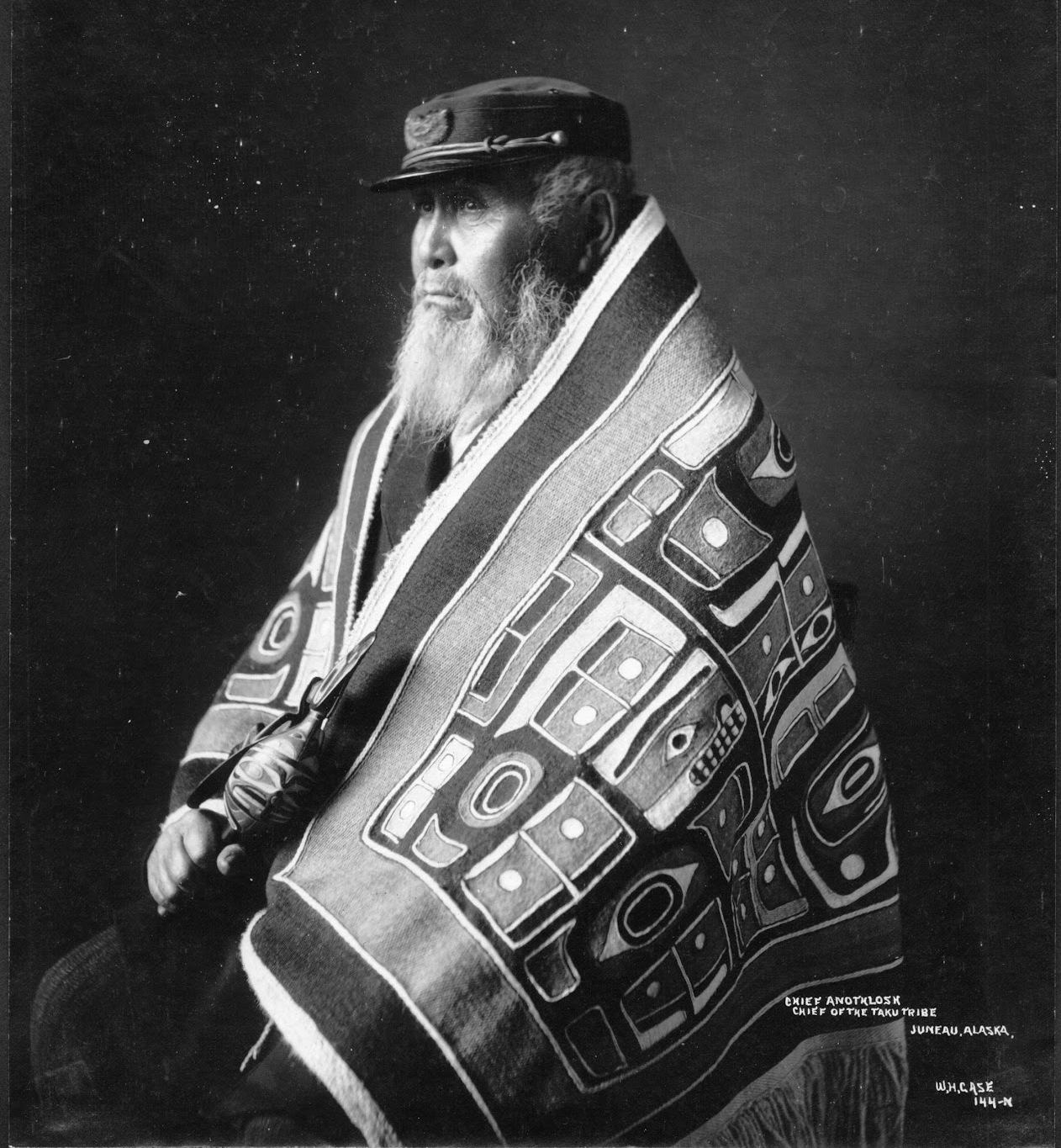
- Chief Anotklosh of the Taku Tribe, ca. 1913

Regions with significant populations
- United States (Alaska)

Languages
- Tlingit, English

Related ethnic groups
- Tlingit

The Taku are an Alaska Native people, a ḵwáan or geographic subdivision of the Tlingit, known in their own language as the Tʼaaḵu Ḵwáan or "Geese Flood Upriver Tribe". The Taku traditionally lived along the northwestern coast of North America, in the area that is now the Alexander Archipelago of Alaska, and on the lower basin of the Taku River of the adjoining British Columbia mainland above that river's mouth.

Some Taku Tlingit are enrolled in the Douglas Indian Association, a federally recognized tribe headquartered in Juneau. Others are enrolled in the Taku River Tlingit First Nation, a First Nation in Canada.

== History ==
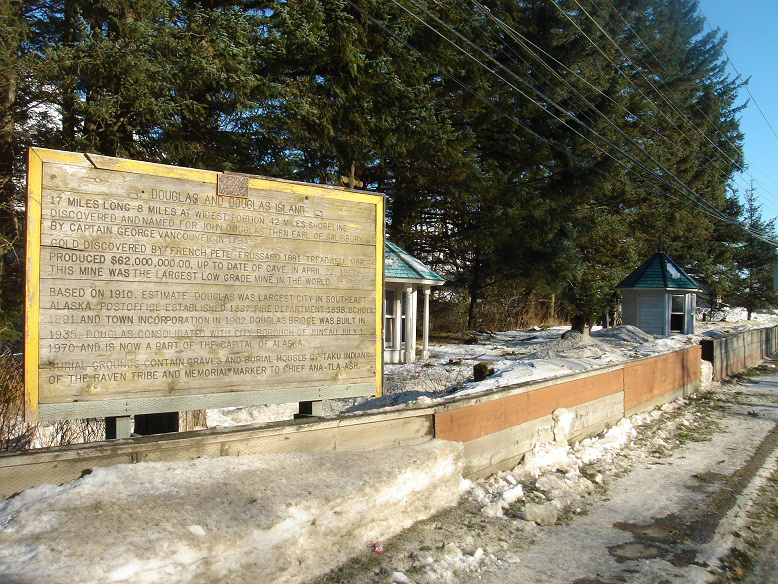
Resting place of several members of the Taku Indians' Raven Clan on Juneau, Alaska's Douglas Island.

The main village of the Taku people was located up the Taku River in what is now the Canadian province of British Columbia. From this main winter village they dispersed to their clan subsistence areas during the spring, summer, and fall. Having a keen appreciation of the advantages of their position for trade, the Taku held possession of the main river in the area that is now Juneau and compelled the natives of the interior territories to use them as middle-men, instead of allowing trade directly with the white settlers.

In the early 1840s, the Hudson's Bay Company established a trading post called Fort Durham in Taku Harbor. This fort was built to take advantage of the trade route up and down the Taku River. With the establishment of the fort, the Taku people abandoned their traditional winter village and moved to the area around the fort. Although Fort Durham was abandoned by 1843 as unprofitable, the Taku stayed in the area of the fort until 1880 when gold was discovered in Juneau. The Taku people then moved to the area around Sheep Creek to work with the miners for wages.

== Divisions and houses of Moieties ==
=== Raven Moiety ===
- G̱aanax̱.ádi (People of G̱aanaax̱)
  - Ishka Hít (Salmon Hole House)
  - Yanwulihashi Hít (Drifted Ashore House)
  - Yéil Hít (Raven House)
- Ishkahittaan (Salmon Hole (house) People)
- Kooḵhittaan (Pit House People)
- Tooḵa.ádi (Needlefish (house) People)

=== Wolf/Eagle Moiety ===
- Yanyeidí
  - Hit Tlein (Big House)
  - Chʼaalʼ Hít (Willow House)
- Tsaateeneidí
  - Xóots Hít (Brown Bear House)
  - Yayuwaa Hít (Between The River Fork House)
- Sʼeetʼḵweidí

== See also ==
- Auke people
- Douglas Indian Association, a federally recognized tribe that includes Taku people
- Tlingit clans
