= Stephens Passage =

Strait in Alaska, United States

Coordinates: 57°49′01″N 133°50′34″W

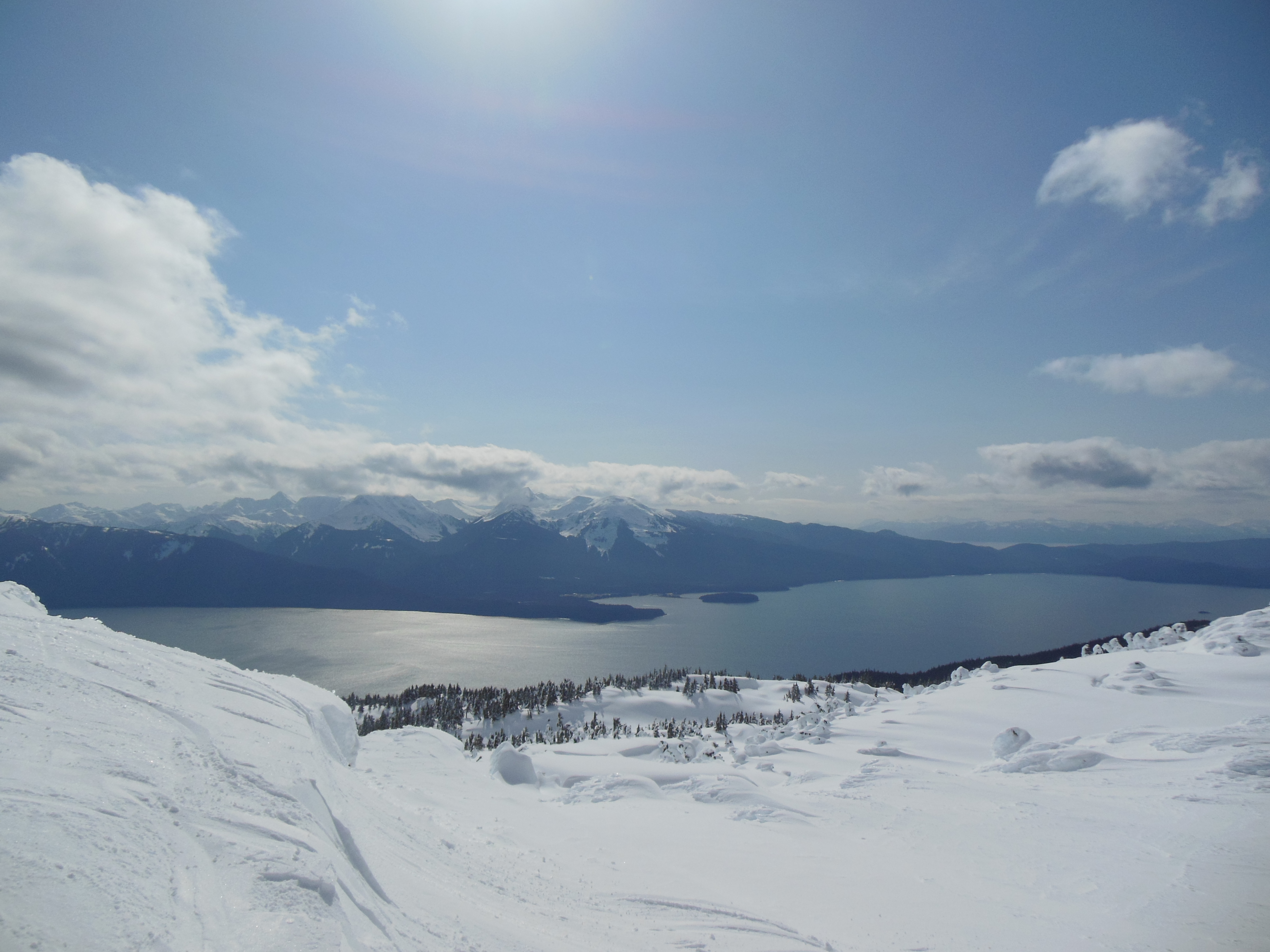
Stephens Passage and Admiralty Island from Douglas Island

Stephens Passage is a channel in the Alexander Archipelago in the southeastern region of the U.S. state of Alaska. It runs between Admiralty Island to the west and the Alaska mainland and Douglas Island to the east, and is about 170 km (105 mi) long. Juneau, the capital of Alaska, is near the north end, on Gastineau Channel.

Stephens Passage was named in 1794 by George Vancouver, probably for Sir Philip Stephens. It was first charted the same year by Joseph Whidbey, master of HMS Discovery during Vancouver's 1791-95 expedition. In 1920, a more detailed survey of the passage followed, by the United States Coast and Geodetic Survey ship USC&GS Explorer and two smaller vessels.
