= Gastineau Channel =

Channel between the mainland of the U.S. state of Alaska and Douglas Island

Coordinates: 58°17′42″N 134°24′26″W

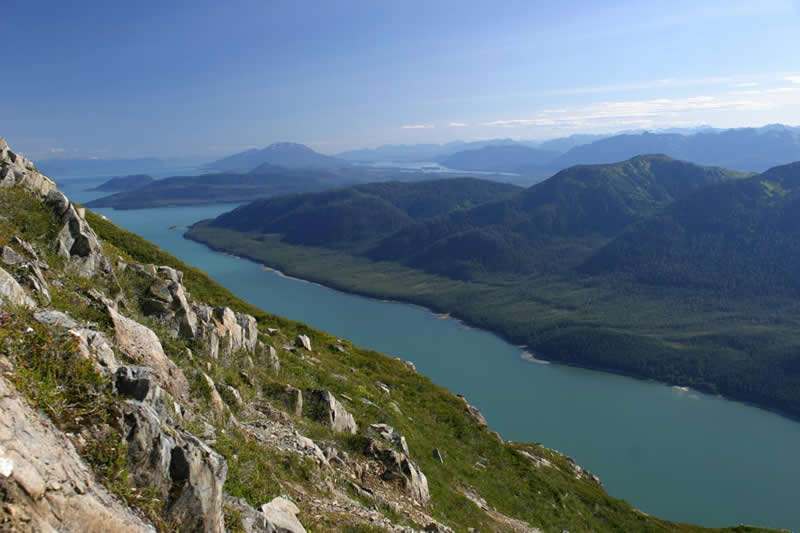
Gastineau Channel, Juneau, Alaska

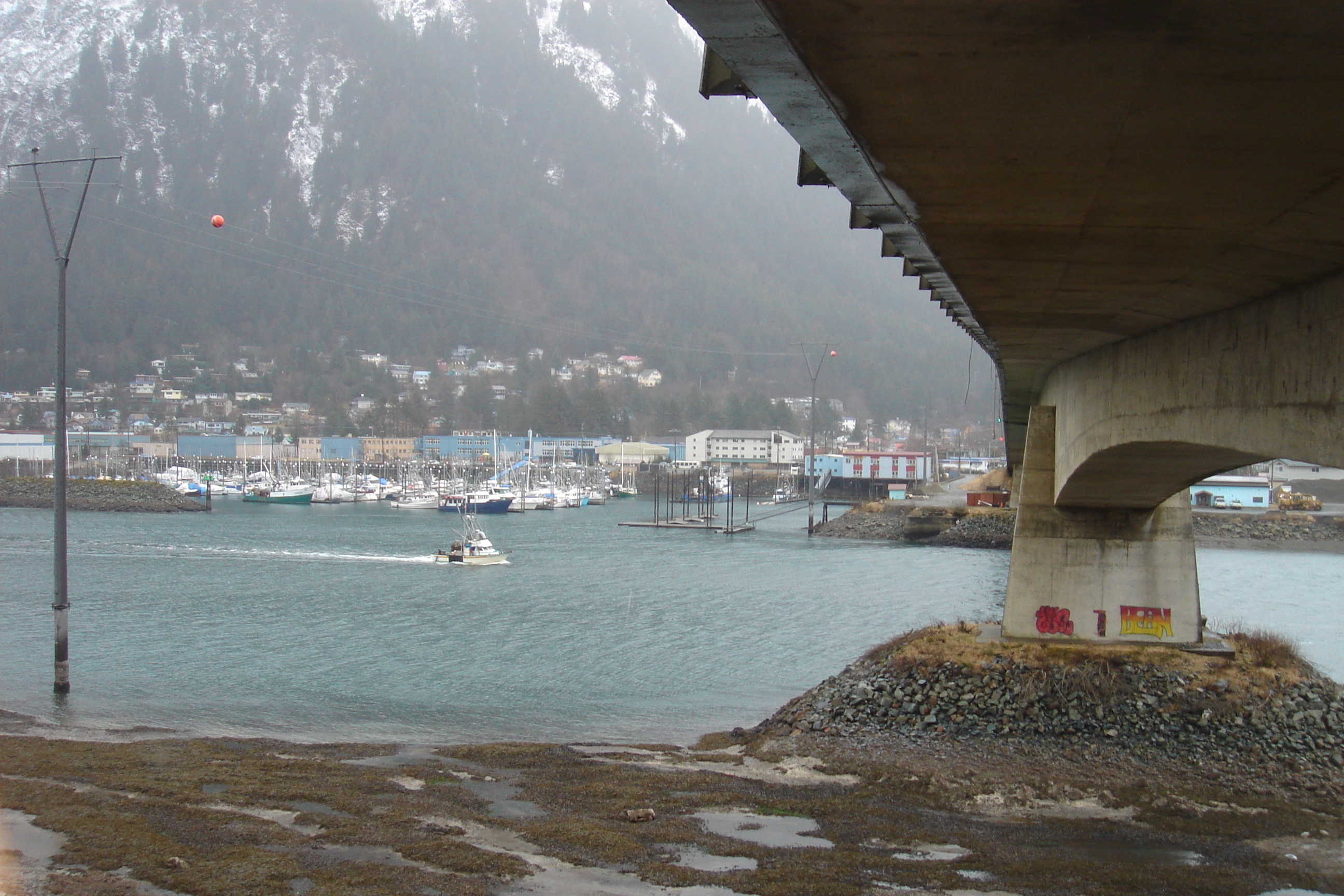
A small vessel heads south through Gastineau Channel, preparing to sail beneath the Douglas Bridge in February, 2011

Gastineau Channel (Lingít: Séet Ká) is a channel between the mainland of the U.S. state of Alaska and Douglas Island in the Alexander Archipelago of southeastern Alaska. It separates Juneau on the mainland side from Douglas (now part of Juneau), on Douglas Island. The first European to sight the channel was Joseph Whidbey whilst serving on the Royal Navy's Vancouver Expedition early in August 1794, first from the south and later from the west. It was probably named for John Gastineau, an English civil engineer and surveyor.

== Characteristics ==
The channel is navigable by large ships, only from the southeast, as far as the Douglas Bridge, approximately 9.7 miles (15.6 km). Between the bridge and Juneau International Airport, approximately 8.1 miles (13.0 km), it is navigable only by smaller craft and only at high tide.

The channel is becoming increasingly unnavigable due to shallow water depths. The two principal causes for this are:

1. Isostatic rebound following the retreat of glacial ice sheets
2. Sedimentation and infilling of the Gastineau Channel by silty sediment produced by the Mendenhall Glacier and Mendenhall River.

If current trends continue, Gastineau Channel may eventually become dry or unnavigable or both.

During isostatic rebound, the Earth's lithosphere (crust) is slowly rising because of buoyant forces, following the removal of a large mass on the surface. This can be likened to an ice cube floating in a glass of water with a penny sitting on top. The weight of the penny makes the ice cube float lower, similar to the immense weight of a glacier on top of the lithosphere. When the penny (glacier) is removed, the ice cube (lithosphere) "rebounds" and floats slightly higher. In the geologic case, that scenario happens very slowly. Rates of isostatic rebound throughout SE Alaska vary from 0.1 to 1.5 inches/year depending on glacial history. The approximate rebound rate in the Juneau area is 0.25 to 0.5 inches/year.
