= Douglas Island =

Tidal island in Alaska, US

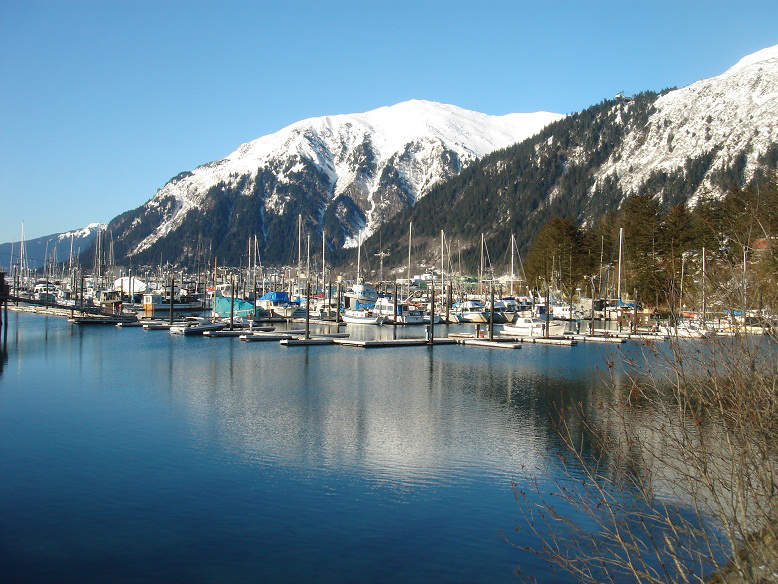
Douglas Harbor in Douglas, Alaska. Mayflower Island, in the midground at right, houses a U.S. Coast Guard station. Mount Juneau is in the background.

Douglas Island (Tlingit: Deishú Áakʼw) is a tidal island in the U.S. state of Alaska. It is part of the city and borough of Juneau, just west of downtown Juneau and east of Admiralty Island. It is separated from mainland Juneau by the Gastineau Channel, and contains the communities of Douglas and West Juneau.

== History ==
Douglas Island was named for John Douglas, Bishop of Salisbury, by Captain George Vancouver. Joseph Whidbey, master of HMS Discovery during Vancouver's expedition, was the first to sight it in 1794. In 1886, non-Native people began to travel to Douglas Island to settle near the developing Treadwell gold mine. By 1902, the Douglas Island community had grown to a population of more than 2,800 residents, as businesses, schools, and homes began to develop alongside the expansion of the nearby gold mine. After the Gastineau Channel flooded the Treadwell mining tunnels in 1917, many residents were forced to move after the town's dramatic economic downturn, causing the Douglas population to decrease steadily until the late 1930s.

During the summer of 1962, the Douglas Indian Village was seized and burned down by Douglas city officials and residents in order to forgo the development of the Douglas Harbor project. The Douglas Harbor project, which was initiated by the Douglas Indian Association and the Bureau of Indian Affairs, was a plan to construct a harbor on the Douglas Indian Village site with the intention of having the village rebuilt. In order to obtain control of the project, Douglas city officials invoked eminent domain on the village site while tribal citizens were fishing at their camps along the Taku River. The tribal citizens were not compensated for the property and belongings that were lost in the burning of their village and were forced to relocate once they returned to the island.

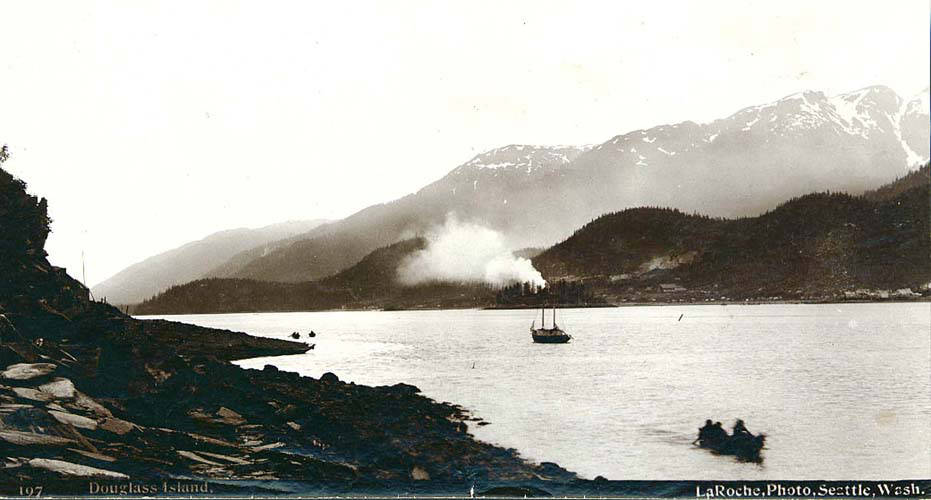
Photo of Douglas Island by Frank La Roche ca. 1897

The Juneau-Douglas Bridge, which was first built in 1935, connected Douglas Island with West Juneau. In 1970, the communities of Douglas and Juneau joined to form the City and Borough of Juneau. The Juneau-Douglas Bridge was later rebuilt in 1980 to provide a two lane road to and from the island and to accommodate both vehicular and pedestrian traffic. There have been plans to build a new bridge from North Douglas to the Mendenhall Valley.

== Geography ==
Admiralty Island lies to the west and south, across the Stephens Passage.

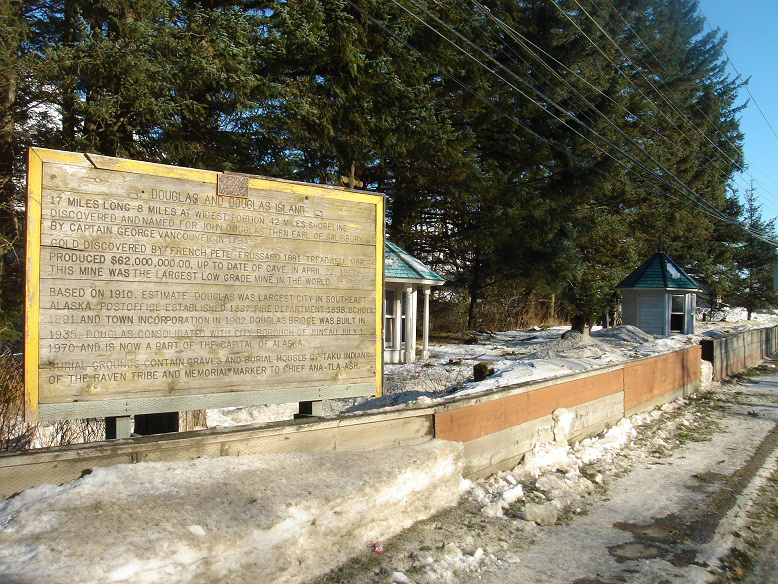
Resting place of several members of the Taku's Raven Clan.

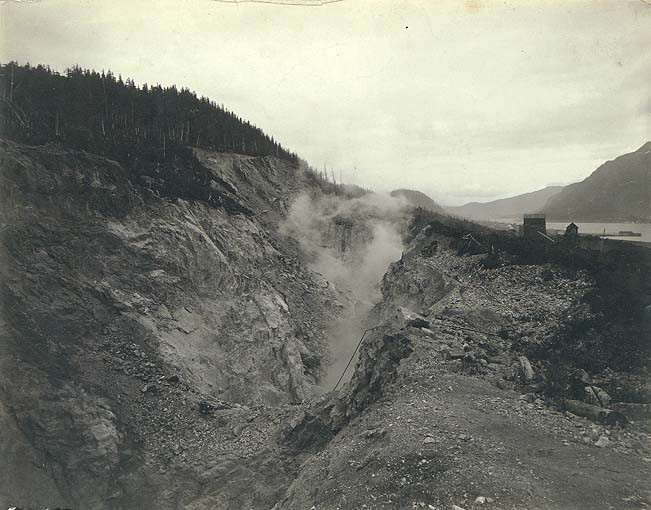
Mining operations at Treadwell Gold Mine on Douglas Island, circa 1900

Features of the island include remnants of the Treadwell gold mine, Sandy Beach, the only sand beach in the Juneau area (made from mine tailings), Eaglecrest Ski Area, Perseverance Theatre, and the Douglas Public Library. As a tidal island, Douglas is connected to the mainland at its north end when the Gastineau Channel is at low tide. During low tide, Douglas Island is connected with Juneau's Twin Lakes area, the Juneau International Airport as well as other sites.

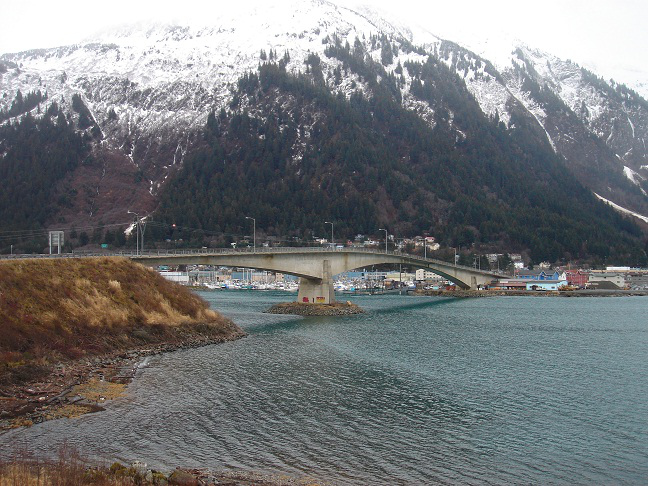
Douglas Bridge, the bridge crossing Gastineau Channel, connecting downtown Juneau with Douglas Island. The original bridge was built in 1935. The replacement (current) bridge, shown here, was completed in 1980.

Douglas is usually thought of as two areas: downtown Douglas 58°16′32″N 134°23′33″W (including West Juneau 58°17′42″N 134°25′46″W), containing Douglas Harbor, Sandy Beach, the mines, the library, Gastineau Elementary, the theatre, the gas station, the few bars and restaurants, and the bridge to Juneau; and North Douglas Island, containing a tank farm, Eaglecrest Ski Area, and a heliport.

The island has a land area of 76.93 square miles (199.25 km^{2}) and had a population of 5,297 at the 2000 United States census, with over half of the island's population residing in Douglas proper. It is part of the City and Borough of Juneau. The island's highest point, Mount Ben Stewart, was named in honor of Benjamin D. Stewart (1878–1976), an early mayor of Juneau.

=== Climate ===
Climate data for Douglas Island, Alaska (Eaglecrest, 1991–2020 normals, extremes 2004–present)
Month	Jan	Feb	Mar	Apr	May	Jun	Jul	Aug	Sep	Oct	Nov	Dec	Year
Record high °F (°C)	53 (12)	53 (12)	54 (12)	61 (16)	75 (24)	85 (29)	82 (28)	84 (29)	75 (24)	60 (16)	50 (10)	49 (9)	85 (29)
Mean maximum °F (°C)	39.1 (3.9)	41.4 (5.2)	44.4 (6.9)	53.9 (12.2)	67.4 (19.7)	73.4 (23.0)	75.1 (23.9)	74.8 (23.8)	65.5 (18.6)	51.8 (11.0)	42.3 (5.7)	40.3 (4.6)	78.5 (25.8)
Mean daily maximum °F (°C)	28.9 (−1.7)	30.2 (−1.0)	33.7 (0.9)	43.6 (6.4)	52.3 (11.3)	57.7 (14.3)	59.5 (15.3)	59.3 (15.2)	52.9 (11.6)	42.3 (5.7)	34.1 (1.2)	29.7 (−1.3)	43.7 (6.5)
Daily mean °F (°C)	24.4 (−4.2)	25.6 (−3.6)	28.2 (−2.1)	36.3 (2.4)	43.9 (6.6)	50.2 (10.1)	53.4 (11.9)	52.9 (11.6)	47.1 (8.4)	38.0 (3.3)	30.2 (−1.0)	26.3 (−3.2)	38.0 (3.3)
Mean daily minimum °F (°C)	19.9 (−6.7)	20.9 (−6.2)	22.6 (−5.2)	28.9 (−1.7)	35.4 (1.9)	42.6 (5.9)	47.3 (8.5)	46.5 (8.1)	41.2 (5.1)	33.7 (0.9)	26.2 (−3.2)	22.8 (−5.1)	32.3 (0.2)
Mean minimum °F (°C)	1.4 (−17.0)	4.6 (−15.2)	6.6 (−14.1)	18.5 (−7.5)	27.0 (−2.8)	32.4 (0.2)	39.2 (4.0)	39.1 (3.9)	30.6 (−0.8)	25.2 (−3.8)	10.6 (−11.9)	7.3 (−13.7)	−4.2 (−20.1)
Record low °F (°C)	−10 (−23)	−13 (−25)	−5 (−21)	10 (−12)	7 (−14)	16 (−9)	25 (−4)	33 (1)	18 (−8)	14 (−10)	−5 (−21)	−7 (−22)	−13 (−25)
Average precipitation inches (mm)	9.44 (240)	6.52 (166)	6.29 (160)	5.94 (151)	5.32 (135)	6.07 (154)	8.11 (206)	10.07 (256)	13.09 (332)	12.65 (321)	10.59 (269)	10.43 (265)	104.52 (2,655)
Average snowfall inches (cm)	36.2 (92)	39.3 (100)	37.2 (94)	9.2 (23)	0.7 (1.8)	0.0 (0.0)	0.0 (0.0)	0.0 (0.0)	0.0 (0.0)	1.8 (4.6)	28.8 (73)	40.6 (103)	193.8 (491.4)
Average precipitation days (≥ 0.01 in)	22.2	17.9	18.1	17.5	15.9	19.4	19.6	20.5	21.1	22.9	22.0	22.3	239.4
Average snowy days (≥ 0.1 in)	15.1	13.7	14.7	6.1	0.3	0.0	0.0	0.0	0.0	0.7	12.5	17.1	80.2
Source: NOAA

== Politics ==
Following the 2012 election of Merrill Sanford, the incumbent mayor of Juneau, the Juneau Empire noted the island's "outsized contribution" to Juneau-area politics. Sanford, Byron Mallott (former lieutenant governor of Alaska) and Dennis Egan (currently Juneau's representative in the Alaska Senate) live in West Juneau. Sally Smith, who succeeded Egan as mayor, lives in the Lawson Creek neighborhood between Douglas and West Juneau, while her successor Bruce Botelho lives in Douglas. Beth Kerttula, who represented portions of Juneau in the Alaska House of Representatives from 1999 to 2014, lives in North Douglas. Additionally, John Dimond, the first Juneau-based justice of the Alaska Supreme Court, lived in Douglas, while his successor Robert Boochever lived along the Douglas Highway a half-mile north of Douglas's then-city limits.
