= Alaska's Flag =

State song of Alaska

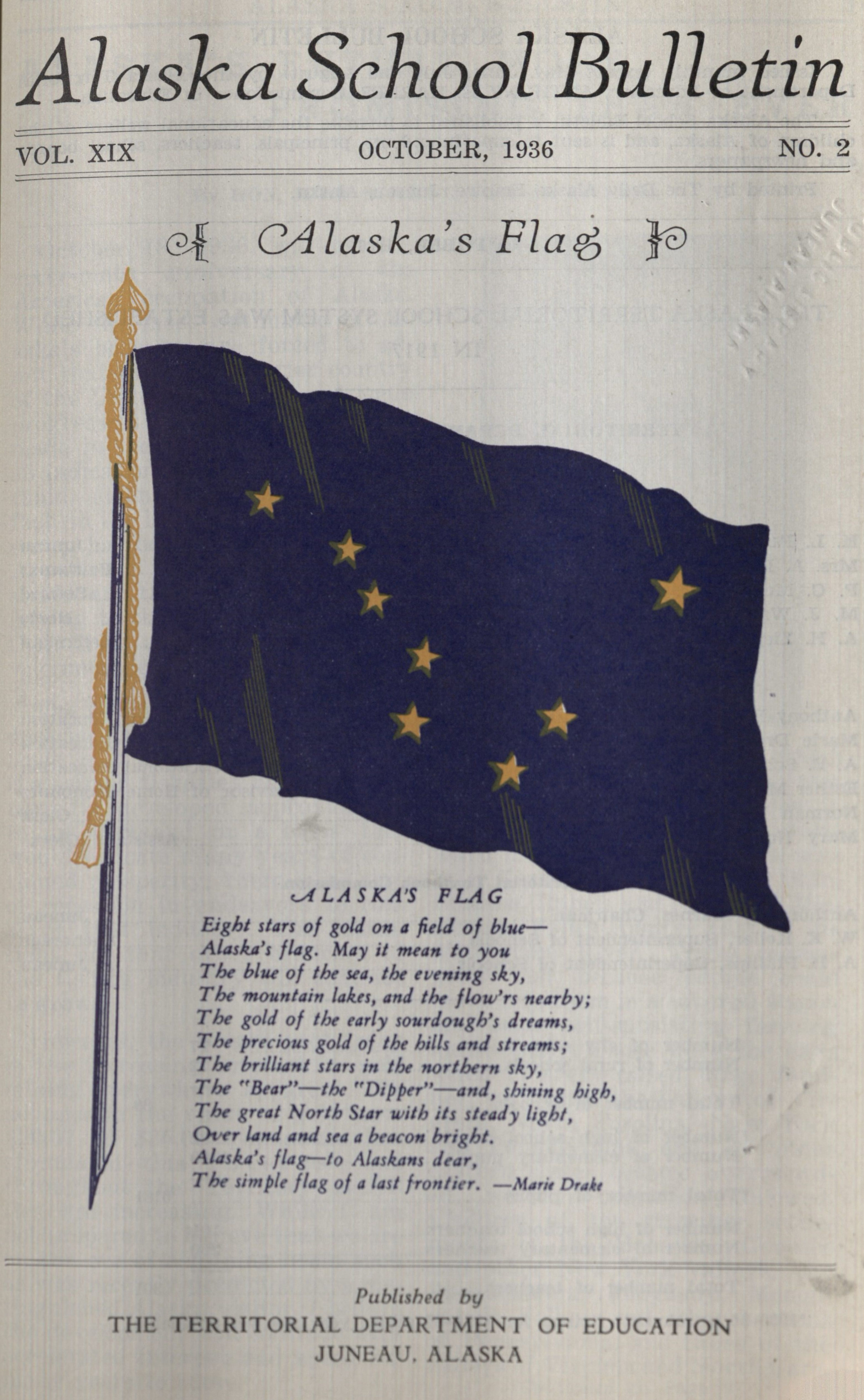
- The front cover of the October 1936 issue of Alaska School Bulletin, highlighting Marie Drake's poem.
- State anthem of Alaska
- Also known as: Beyond Your Dreams Within Your Reach
- Lyrics: Marie Drake, 1935
- Music: Elinor Dusenbury, 1938
- Adopted: 1959

Audio sample
- Digital instrumental version (one verse and chorus): file; help

Alaska's Flag is the regional anthem of the U.S. state of Alaska. It was adopted in 1959, as Alaska became the 49th state.

== Lyrics ==
Unique among state songs, its lyrics explain the symbolism of the Alaskan flag. The lyrics are:

Eight stars of gold on a field of blue
Alaska's flag. May it mean to you
The blue of the sea, the evening sky,
The mountain lakes, and the flow'rs nearby;
The gold of the early sourdough's dreams,
The precious gold of the hills and streams;
The brilliant stars in the northern sky,
The "Bear," the "Dipper," and, shining high,
The great North Star with its steady light,
O'er land and sea a beacon bright.
Alaska's flag to Alaskans dear,
The simple flag of a last frontier.

The connection between the song and the flag happened both by design and circumstance. It was the result of the linkage among three individuals: Benny Benson, Marie Drake, and Elinor Dusenbury. They did not directly collaborate, but instead, Marie Drake built on the work of Benny Benson, and Elinor Dusenbury built on the work of the other two. Benson inspired the effort, Drake wrote the lyrics, and Dusenbury composed the song.

== History ==
The flag of the state of Alaska

Alaska's official flag is based on Benny Benson's design, which was submitted in a Territory-wide contest for schoolchildren sponsored by the American Legion in 1926. At that time Benny was a thirteen-year-old seventh-grader of Russian-Aleut and Swedish descent, studying at the Territorial School at Seward and a resident of the Jesse Lee Mission Home. The Alaska Territorial Legislature officially adopted his design on May 2, 1927. The proclamation praised his winning entry for, "its simplicity, its originality and its symbolism." On the design submission, Benny had written the following words of explanation: “The blue field is for the Alaska sky and the forget-me-not, an Alaska flower. The North Star is for the future of the state of Alaska, the most northerly in the Union. The dipper is for the Great Bear — symbolizing strength.”

Alaska Department of Education employee Marie Drake echoed Benny Benson's explanation of his design in a poem she wrote in 1935. Marie Drake had become the Territorial Assistant Commissioner of Education in 1934. She edited and wrote most of the material for the School Bulletin, which was circulated throughout the Territorial school system. The poem first appeared on the cover of the October 1935 School Bulletin.

Elinor Dusenbury soon composed a song around the poem and the flag. The wife of the Commanding Officer of the Chilkoot Barracks at Haines from 1933 to 1936, she had fallen deeply in love with Alaska, but she left when her husband was transferred. She said, "I wrote the music for Marie's beautiful poetry from pure unadulterated homesickness for Alaska! I shed more tears on the boat going out than I ever have before or since. I had a book on Alaska with the picture the flag and Marie's poem." In the summer of 1938, Dusenbury visited Juneau and played her setting of the poem for Marie on the piano at the Baranof Hotel. Happiness came to the poet's eyes.

The song began gradually to be played unofficially, and steadily grew in popularity over the next two decades. To the surprise and delight of both women, the Territorial Legislature adopted Alaska's Flag in 1955. It became the official State song when the Territory of Alaska entered the union as the 49th state in 1959.

== Historical notes ==
Benny Benson chose the background color of the flag to represent both the blue sky and the forget-me-not. The Legislature later named the forget-me-not as the official State flower. This provides another symbolic link, one between the official State flag, the official song and the official flower.

The late Carol Beery Davis, a Juneau resident and musician, wrote a second verse to the Alaska Flag song and gifted the words (protected by copyright) to the University of Alaska Foundation in 1987. It has been unsuccessfully proposed as an addition to the official lyrics several times. The last time was during the legislative session of 2011, but the time limit in the Senate expired before the bill could come up for a vote.
