= Mendenhall Valley, Juneau =

Alaskan state capitol region geographical feature

Coordinates: 58°23′30″N 134°34′00″W

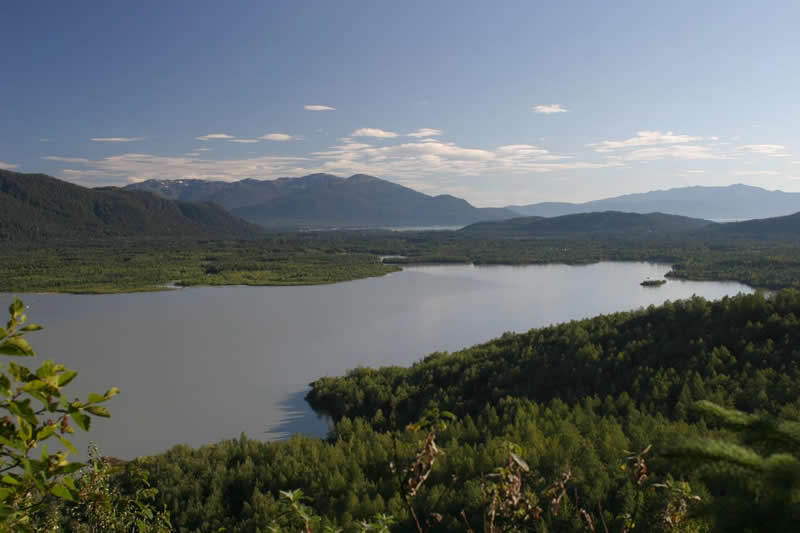
Mendenhall Valley, Juneau, Alaska.

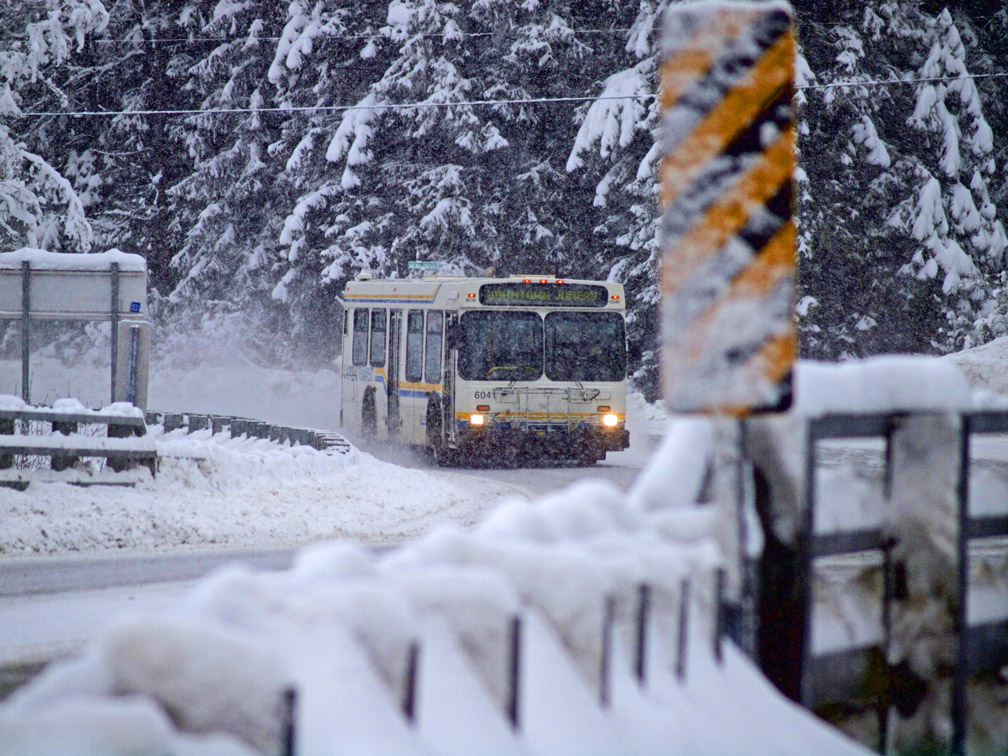
Capital Transit System bus approaching the Mendenhall River bridge on Mendenhall Loop Road in December 2012. This bridge marks the furthest crossing upriver.

The Mendenhall Valley (colloquially The Valley) [Lingít: Áakʼw Táak] is the drainage area of the Mendenhall River in the U.S. state of Alaska. The valley contains a series of neighborhoods, comprising the largest populated place within the corporate limits of the City and Borough of Juneau, Alaska's capital.

The valley was formed by Mendenhall Glacier over the course of roughly 3,000 years. It was named for the American physicist and meteorologist Thomas Corwin Mendenhall.

The Mendenhall Valley begins ten miles from the downtown area, at the intersection of Egan Drive and Glacier Highway, and ends ten miles further west at the intersection of Glacier Highway and Mendenhall Loop Road at Auke Bay. The Valley comprises an area stretching from the wetlands along Fritz Cove and Auke Bay back to the Mendenhall Glacier as well as Mendenhall Lake and the Mendenhall River, which for the most part drains the Valley.

The Valley forms the core of Alaska's 34th election (or state House) district, which is represented in the Alaska House of Representatives by Andi Story. Along with the rest of Juneau and adjoining communities, it is part of Senate District Q, represented in the Alaska Senate by Jesse Kiehl.

There are four elementary schools (Auke Bay, Glacier Valley, Mendenhall River, and Riverbend), one middle school (Floyd Dryden), and one high school (Thunder Mountain) located in Mendenhall Valley. Most of Juneau's churches are located in the Valley.

== Points of interest ==
- Adair-Kennedy Memorial Park
- Fritz Cove
- Heintzleman Ridge
- Juneau International Airport
- Mendenhall Glacier
- Mendenhall Lake
- Mendenhall Mall
- Mendenhall River
  - Brotherhood Bridge
- Mendenhall Wetlands State Game Refuge
- Nugget Mall
- Diamond park
- Mendenhall Glacier Visitor Center
