= Marie Drake =

American social worker

- Born: Claudia Marie Slater; February 11, 1888
- Died: March 5, 1963 (aged 75); Juneau, Alaska
- Known for: "Alaska's Flag"

Claudia Marie Drake (née Slater; February 11, 1888 – March 5, 1963) was an American social worker and educational administrator. She is known for writing the lyrics to "Alaska's Flag", the official state song of Alaska.

== Biography ==
Drake spent most of her early life in Van Wert, Ohio, where she married James Drake in 1907. The Drakes came to the Territory of Alaska through James Drake's employment with the Bureau of Public Roads.

She spent most of her professional career employed by the territory's Department of Education, where she worked from 1917 to 1945, and was assistant commissioner of the department from 1934 until her retirement. As editor of the department's School Bulletin publication, she wrote a poem about the flag of Alaska which was published in the October 1935 edition of the Bulletin. This poem would form the lyrics of the song "Alaska's Flag", following Elinor Dusenberry's inspiration to set the poem to music. The song was adopted as Alaska's official song by the territorial legislature in 1955. Prior to that, a lyrical adaptation of "Maryland, My Maryland", written by a Juneau high school student during the early years of the 20th century, had been recognized by the Pioneers of Alaska as Alaska's official song, but had not received any such recognition by a governmental body.

== Legacy ==
Marie Drake Junior High School, the Marie Drake Auditorium and the Marie Drake Planetarium, all located in Juneau, Alaska, were named in her honor. These are housed in what is currently known as the Marie Drake Building, located near the Juneau-Douglas Bridge and Juneau-Douglas High School, which is currently home to Yaaḵoosgé Daakahídi Alternative High School.

She received an honorary doctorate by the University of Alaska in 1958.
