= Capital Transit System =

Public transportation agency in Juneau, Alaska

Coordinates: 58°22′11″N 134°36′34″W

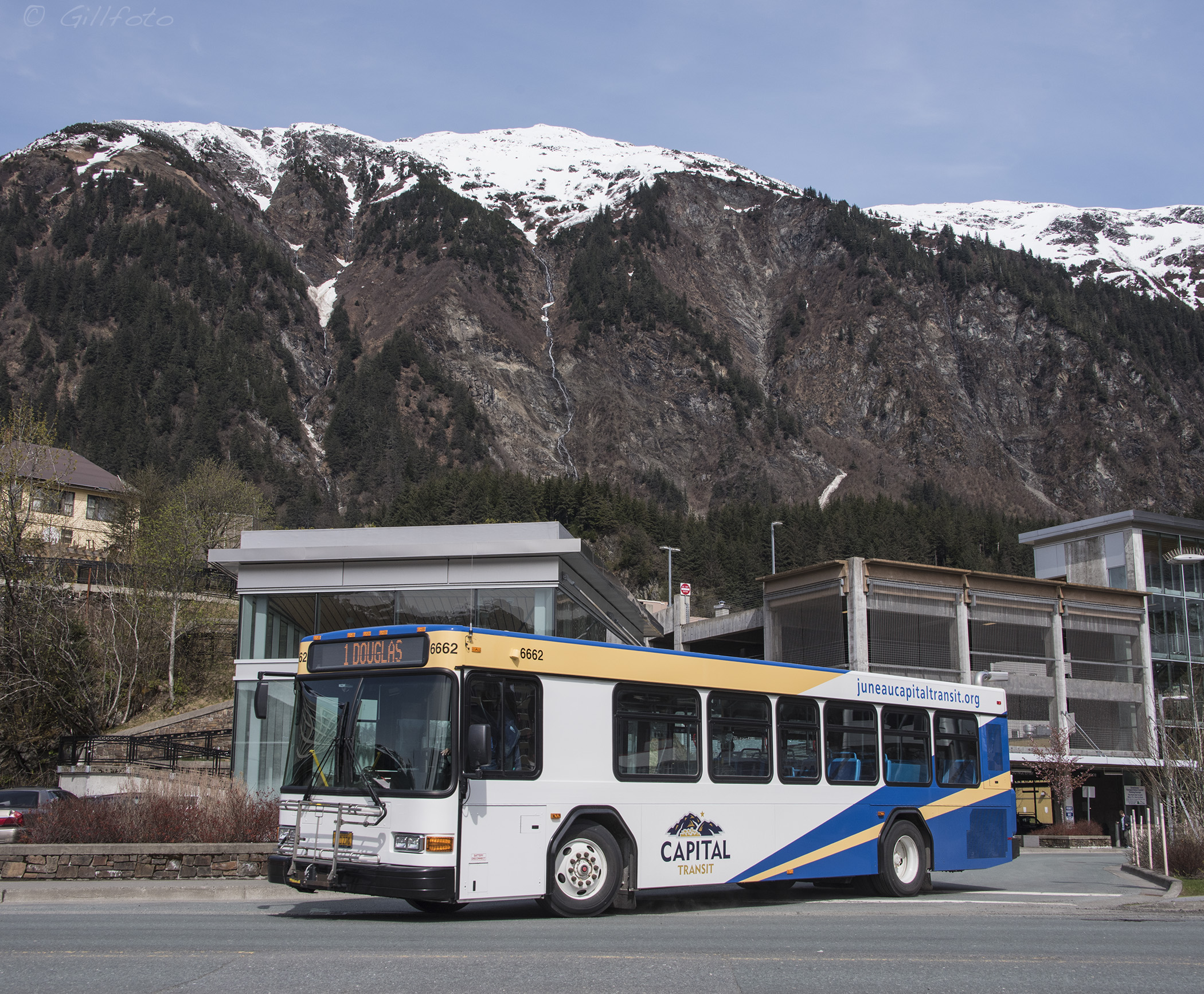
- Capital Transit System bus at the Downtown Transit Center
- Headquarters: 10099 Bentwood Place; Juneau, Alaska 99801
- Locale: Juneau, Alaska
- Service type: Bus service
- Routes: 8
- Fuel type: Diesel/Electric
- Website: juneaucapitaltransit.org

The Capital Transit System is the public transportation agency that serves the City and Borough of Juneau, Alaska. Owned by the municipality, it operates eight bus routes - three of which are labeled as the "Core Service" and run seven days a week (from 6 am to 11 pm Monday-Saturday & 9 am to 6 pm on Sundays) with the remaining five running as limited weekday connector. express, or commuter services. Although CTS previously operated routes that offered complete flag stop service along their entire route, routing changes that took place in November 2022 coinciding with the opening of the Mendenhall Valley Transit Center eliminated those routes. In areas where there are no signed bus stops, patrons can still flag down the bus in any location where it is safe for the bus to pull over.

== Services ==
=== Core Service ===
Core Service routes operate seven days a week with reduced service on weekends and holidays.

- 1 Douglas: The fourth main population center of the borough is served by this route. It begins by making a narrow loop through Juneau's government corridor and downtown, before passing west over the Juneau-Douglas Bridge and heading south along the Douglas Highway, ending where 3rd Street turns into St. Anns before looping around at Savikko Park/Sandy Beach.
- 3 Mendenhall Valley Counterclockwise: This route serves three of the four primary populated places in the borough: Mendenhall Valley, Lemon Creek, and the city center of Juneau. In the west, the route makes a large counterclockwise loop through the Mendenhall Valley, serving the Mendenhall Valley Transit Center (located at the Mendenhall Mall) before travelling east along the older and more business-lined Glacier Highway (as opposed to Eagan Drive, the bypass). While passing through the Lemon Creek area, it passes Gastineau Humane Society, the Juneau Police Department, Bartlett Regional Hospital, and various homes and business. It ends in the east with a narrow loop through central Juneau, passing various government buildings.
- 4 Mendenhall Valley Clockwise: Follows the same route as route 3, but instead does a clockwise loop around Mendenhall.

=== Express, Connector, & Commuter Service ===
Express, Connector, & Commuter routes operate Monday to Friday with limited or no service during off-peak times.

- 5 University Connector: Hourly weekday connector service between the Mendenhall Valley Transit Center and the university via Auke Bay.^
- 6 Riverside/Airport Connector: Hourly weekday connector service between the Mendenhall Valley Transit Center, Riverside Drive, the airport, and the Nugget and Mendenhall Malls.^
- 7 Lemon Creek Commuter: Weekday express service from downtown Juneau to Lemon Creek, Mendenhall Valley, and Auke Bay. Operates one morning trip from the Mendenhall Valley Transit Center to downtown and two afternoon trips to Mendenhall Valley and Auke Bay via Route 3's counterclockwise loop around the Mendenhall Valley until its terminus at the university entrance.
- 8 Downtown/Valley Express: Half-hourly weekday express service from downtown Juneau to Lemon Creek, Mendenhall Valley, and Auke Bay. Operates express service from Downtown to Lemon Creek and from Lemon Creek to the Mendenhall Valley Transit Center, where it follows Route 3's counterclockwise loop around the Mendenhall Valley.^
- 9 Egan Express: Weekday express service operating direct to downtown Juneau from the Mendenhall Valley Transit Center. Operates three morning trips to downtown as well as one morning trip and two afternoon trips to Mendenhall Valley.

("Downtown" in this list refers to any stop in Downtown Juneau, including the Downtown Transit Center, the Federal Building, 4th Street & Seward Street, and Franklin & Front Street.)

^Due to a driver shortage, Routes 5, 6, and 8 are only operating during peak hours (7-10 am & 2-6 pm).

== Former Routes ==
- 10 Taku Commuter: Weekday morning connector route connecting Taku Blvd residents to the Mendenhall Valley Transit Center. Operated three morning one-directional trips to the Transit Center. The route was cancelled in 2024 and to compensate the 8 Downtown/Valley Express was re-routed to turn before it reaches Mendenhall River Community School on Back Loop Road to access Riverside Drive.
- 11 Douglas to Valley Express: Weekday morning express from Douglas to Auke Bay via downtown.
- 12 North Douglas: Weekday service between North Douglas and downtown, with one bus into downtown in the AM and one returning in the PM.
- 14 Mendenhall / Riverside Commuter: Weekday morning express from Glacier Highway & Industrial Boulevard to downtown.
- 15 Valley / UAS Express: Weekday morning reverse express from downtown to the university.
- 16 Taku Express: Weekday morning express from Glacier Highway & Industrial Boulevard to downtown via Mendenhall Loop Road.
