= Yaaḵoosgé Daakahídi Alternative High School =

High school in Alaska, United States

Coordinates: 58°18′11″N 134°25′27″W

- Juneau, Alaska; United States

Information
- School type: Alternative High School
- Teaching staff: 7.00 (FTE)
- Age: 16+
- Enrollment: 80 (2024-2025)
- Student to teacher ratio: 11.43
- Language: English; Tlingit
- Website: https://ydhs.juneauschools.org/en

Yaaḵoosgé Daakahídi Alternative High School is a high school of the Juneau School District in the City and Borough of Juneau, Alaska, United States. The school is an opportunity for students over the age of 16 to have a less mainstream high school experience than that offered by Juneau-Douglas High School. In recent years, the school has hosted nearly 100 students ages 16+. The school serves students at risk of dropping out, about half of whom are from racial and ethnic minorities. About 40 students are able to graduate each year.

The school currently resides on the Dzantik'I Heeni campus (formerly Dzantik'I Heeni Middle School). Prior to the 2024-25 school year Yaaḵoosgé Daakahídi resided in the Marie Drake school building between Harborview and Juneau Douglas High School.

== Programs and curriculum ==
The school integrates the culture and language of the Tlingit for the many Native Alaskan students, who are at higher risk of dropping out of school. Ceremonies have been held to specifically honor the achievements of Tlingit students at the school, as part of an effort to recognize and encourage achievement by Tlingit students.

Students at the school have participated in a nine-week domestic violence program, aimed at cutting the state's nation leading rates of such violence.

== Origin of name ==
Yaakoosgé daakahídi is a Tlingit language phrase meaning "house of learning". The term was created by Tlingit elder Anna Katzeek.
