= Wendy house =

Small playhouse for children

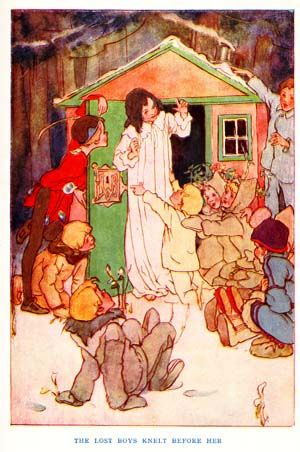
The "Wendy house" from Peter Pan

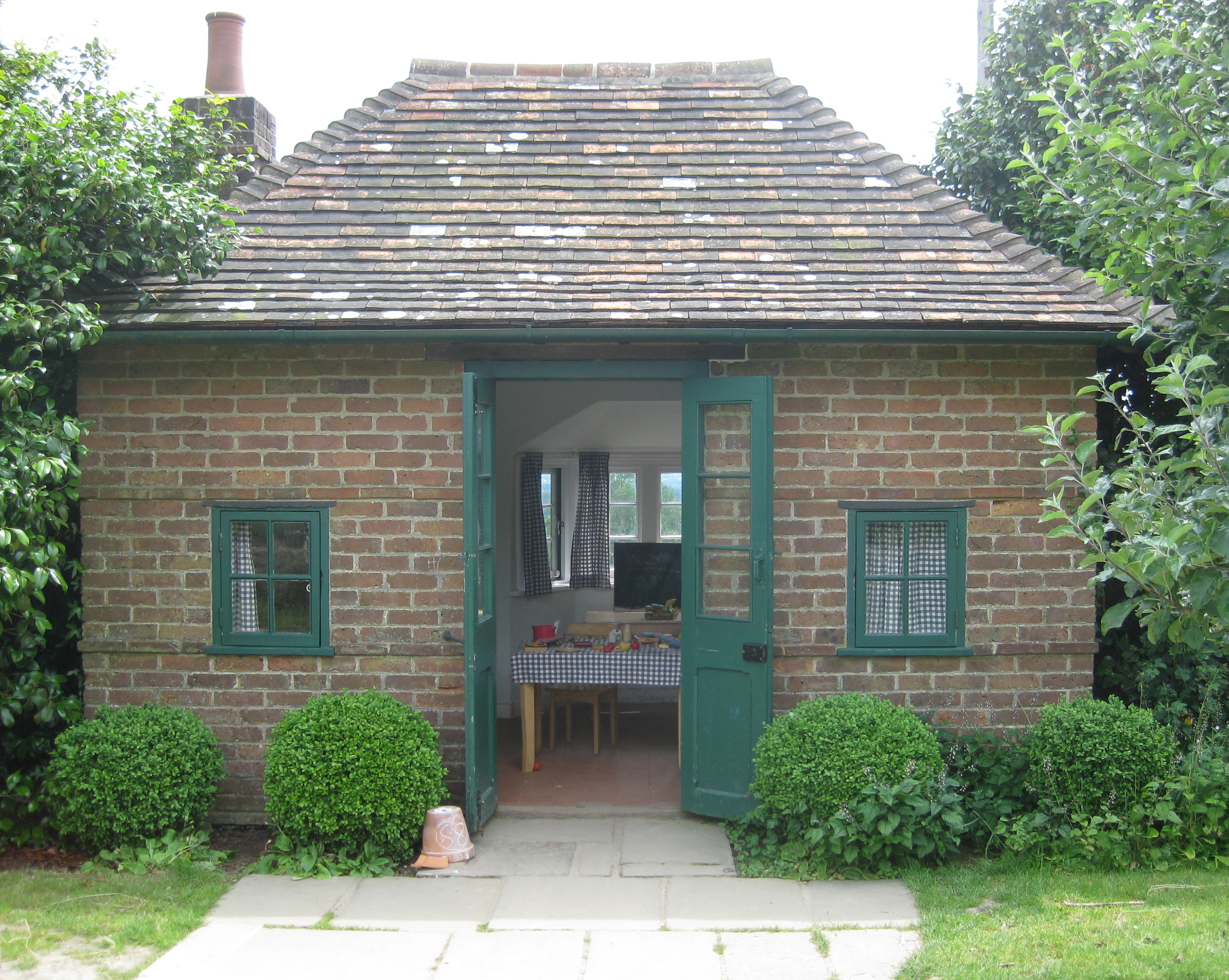
Playhouse built at Chartwell by Winston Churchill for his children

A Wendy house, in the United Kingdom, is a children's miniature dwelling that is large enough for one or more children to enter. Size and solidity can vary from a plastic kit to something resembling a real house in a child's size. Usually there is one room, a doorway with a window on each side, and little or no furniture other than what the children improvise.

The original was built for Wendy Darling in J. M. Barrie's play, Peter Pan, or The Boy Who Wouldn't Grow Up. Wendy was shot by the Lost Boy Tootles after arriving in Neverland, so Peter Pan and the Lost Boys built a small house around her where she had fallen. It was inspired by the wash-house behind Barrie's childhood home in Kirriemuir and first appeared in story form in The Little White Bird in which fairies build a house around Mamie Mannering—the prototype for Wendy—so protecting her from the cold.

A prop house was created by Barrie for the first stage production of the play in 1904. It was constructed like a tent so that it could be erected quickly during a song which Wendy starts with:

I wish I had a darling house
The littlest ever seen,
With funny little red walls
And roof of mossy green.

John's hat was used as a chimney and a slipper was used as a door knocker. Toy manufacturers soon created replicas of the stage Wendy house, which have become a standard toy found in British gardens ever since.

== South African usage ==
In South Africa, Wendy houses are a form of accommodation for live-in domestic workers and is a wooden structure on the employer's property. The structure is usually erected in someone's backyard. They feature basic amenities such as electricity and running water. The corrugated iron homes, known as "shacks", are not Wendy houses. The Wendy houses, in contrast, are a more pleasant sight.

The term "wendy house" or "wendy" usually refers to the wooden temporary accommodation.

Among the more affluent population, wendy houses are used as entertainment huts, children's playhouses, or for storage.

== Playhouses for children around the world ==
Globally, the term playhouse is more generic and more common than the term Wendy house. A few online companies offer rustic, inflatable, or corrugated iron varieties with corporate manufactured designs utilizing plastic, purchased from big-box stores and requiring assembly from brands such as Fisher-Price, Little Tikes, Playskool and Mattel for the suburban backyard market particularly North America and Europe. A playhouse may become a hide-away, fort, club house in a child's imagination or simply a place to "play house" in imitation of adult behavior. Treehouses or tents sometimes serve as a playhouse or secret vantage point for children.

A Cubby House is another name for playhouses. There are both indoor and outdoor children's playhouses and manufactured kits for assembly by adults or children. A playhouse may become a hide-away or club house in a child's imagination. Treehouses built by or for adults are often appropriated by children as a secret vantage point and may become a safety concern.

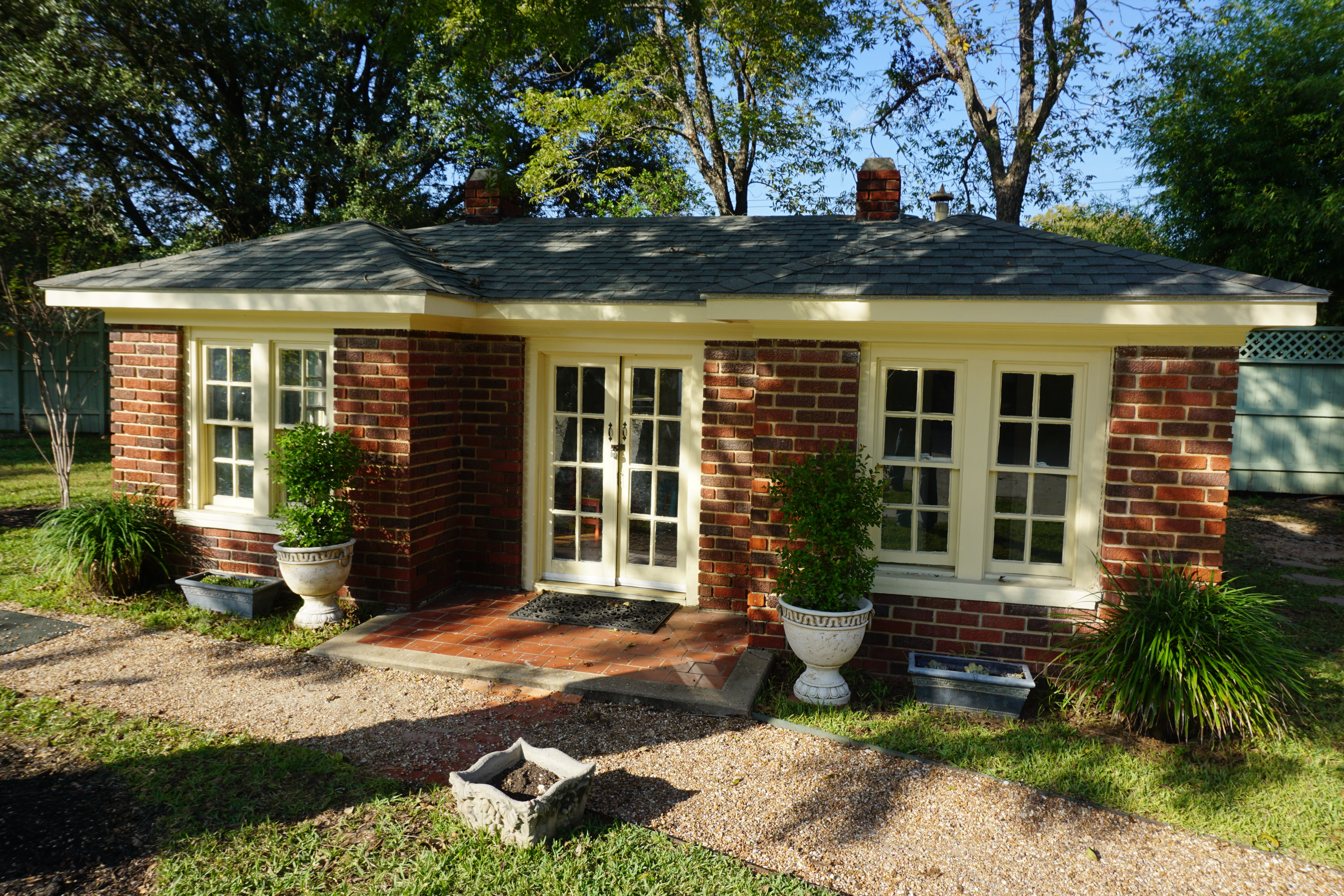
Astin Mansion Children's Playhouse

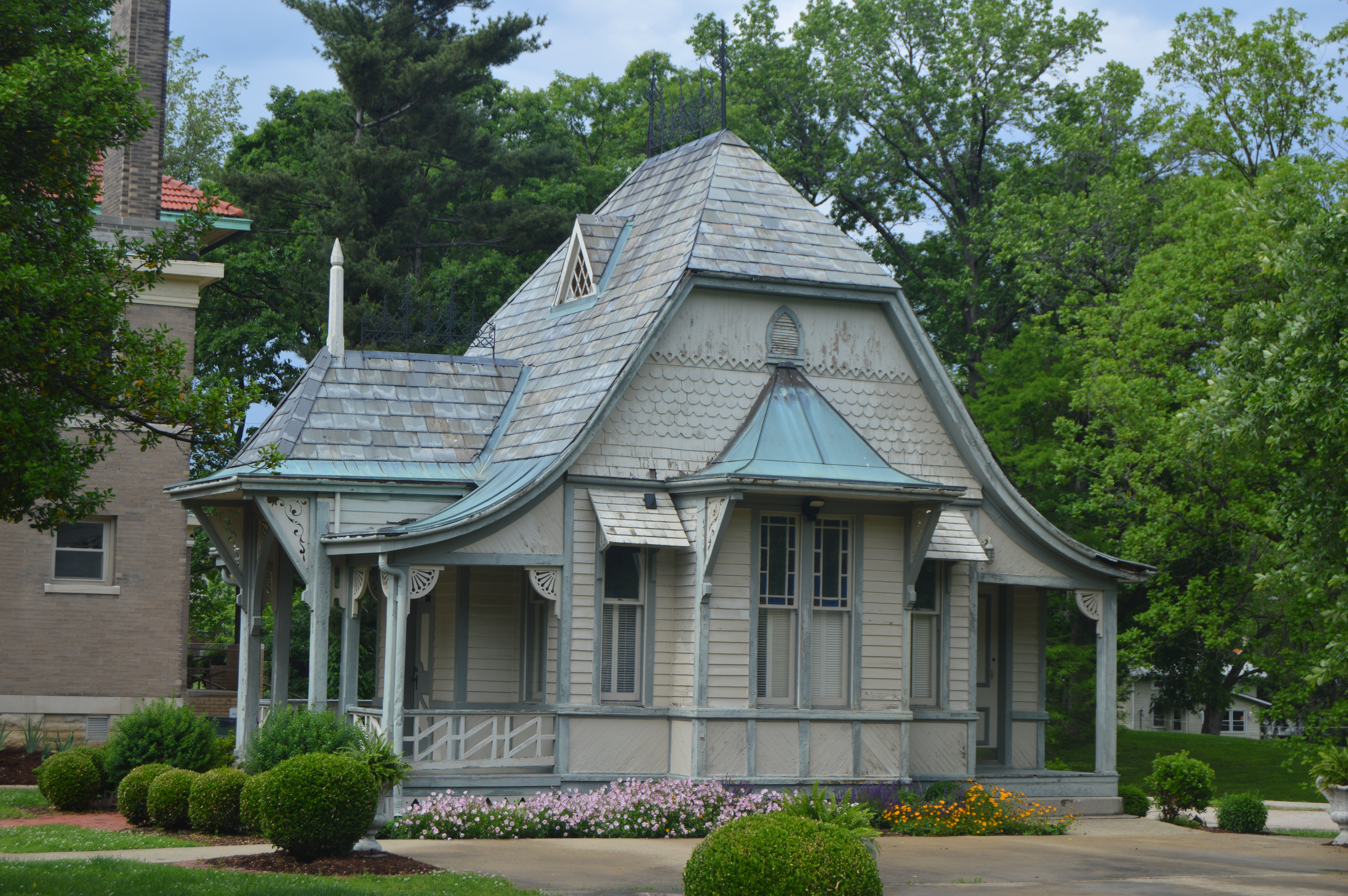
Haskell Playhouse

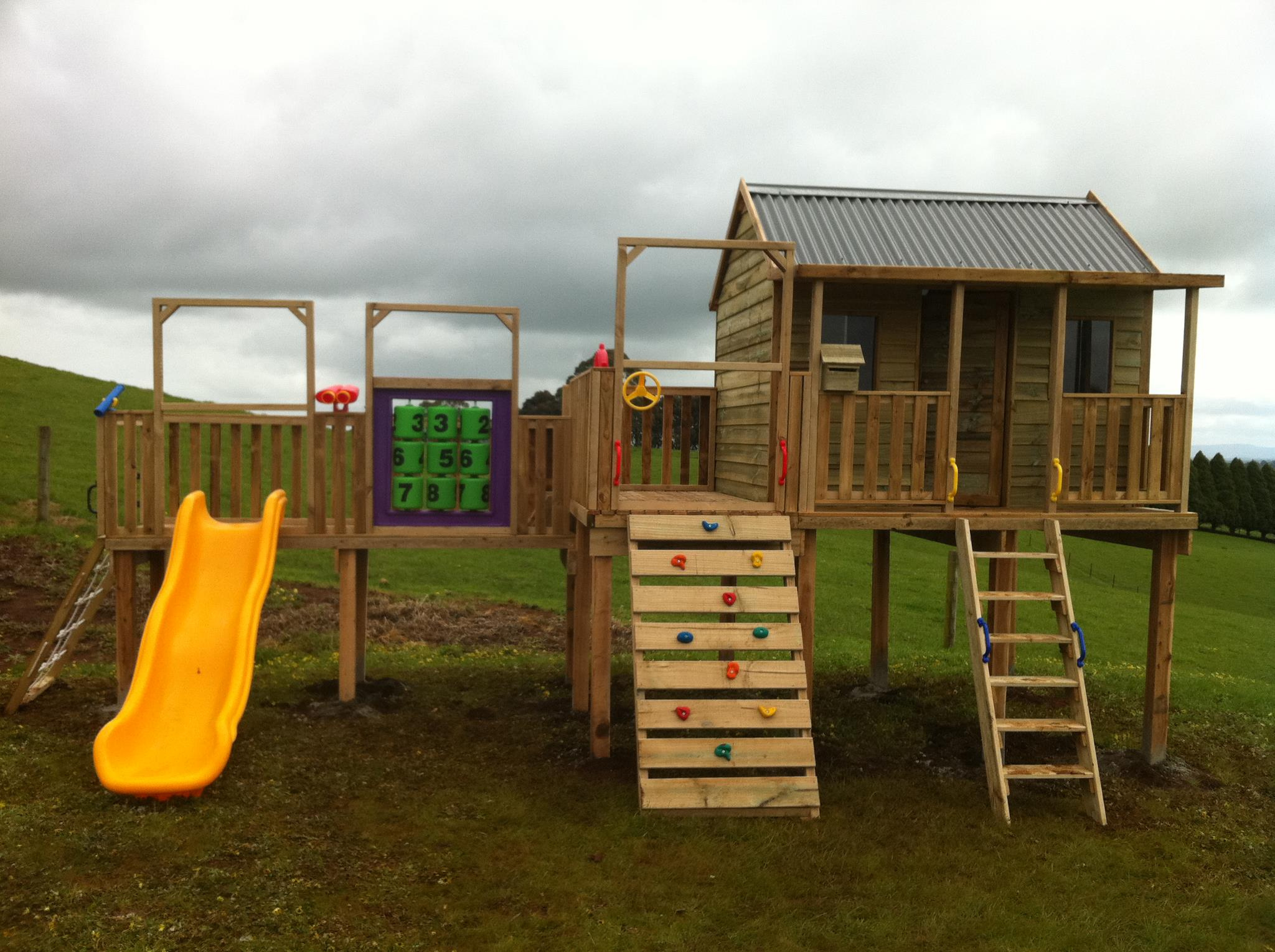
Modern Cubby House design

== See also ==
- Cubby-hole
