= Thunder Mountain High School =

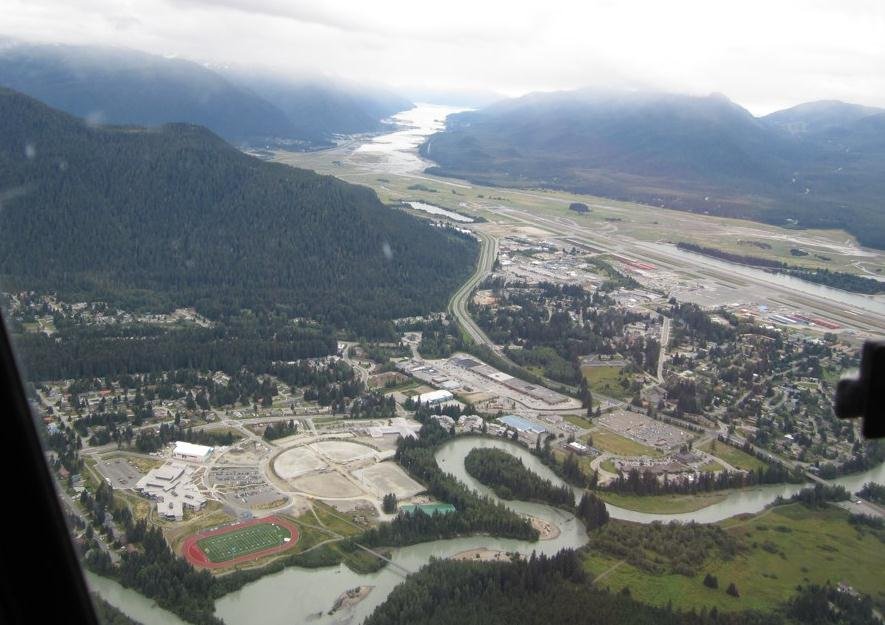
- Thunder Mountain High School is at lower left in this aerial view of the Mendenhall Valley. The Brotherhood Bridge and Juneau International Airport are at right.

Location
- 3101 Riverside Drive; Juneau, Alaska 99801; United States
- 58°22′46″N 134°35′39″W

Information
- Type: Public
- Established: 2008
- Status: closed: became a middle school
- Closed: 2024
- School district: Juneau School District
- CEEB code: 020379
- Teaching staff: 33.30 (on an FTE basis)
- Grades: 9 to 12
- Enrollment: 586 (2022–23)
- Student to teacher ratio: 17.60
- Colors: Blue, white and black
- Mascot: Falcons
- Nickname: TMHS
- Website: tmhs.juneauschools.org/en-US

Thunder Mountain High School was one of three public high schools in Juneau, Alaska; it opened in August 2008. In its first year in operation it served grades 9–11; thus seniors (grade 12 students) in the Juneau School District (grade 12) finished high school at their existing 9-12 schools. It was located in the Mendenhall Valley section of Juneau and drew most of its students from this area, although under an open enrollment policy, all high school students in the district could attend any of the three high schools.

In August 2009, TMMS became an official a member of the Alaska School Activities Association and competes inter-scholastically with other schools in the state in athletic events and academic activities. For athletics, Thunder Mountain was classified as 4A, which includes the largest high schools in the state.

For 2022 580 students were enrolled.

In March 2024 the Juneau School Board voted to continue with a previous decision to close TMHS as a high school due to the board's financial deficit. Starting with the 2024–2025 school year TMHS was to become a middle school, Thunder Mountain Middle School, and its high school students were to be consolidated into Juneau-Douglas High School: Yadaa.at Kalé.

== Sports ==
Fall Sports:

Football, Football Cheer, Cross Country Running, Tennis, Swim/Dive, Volleyball, Dance, Rifle, Drama Debate and Forensics, Robotics, Wrestling

Winter Sports:

Basketball, Basketball Cheer, Pep Band
