= Cubby-hole =

Small play house, or play area, for children

Cubby-hole used by Benny Benson

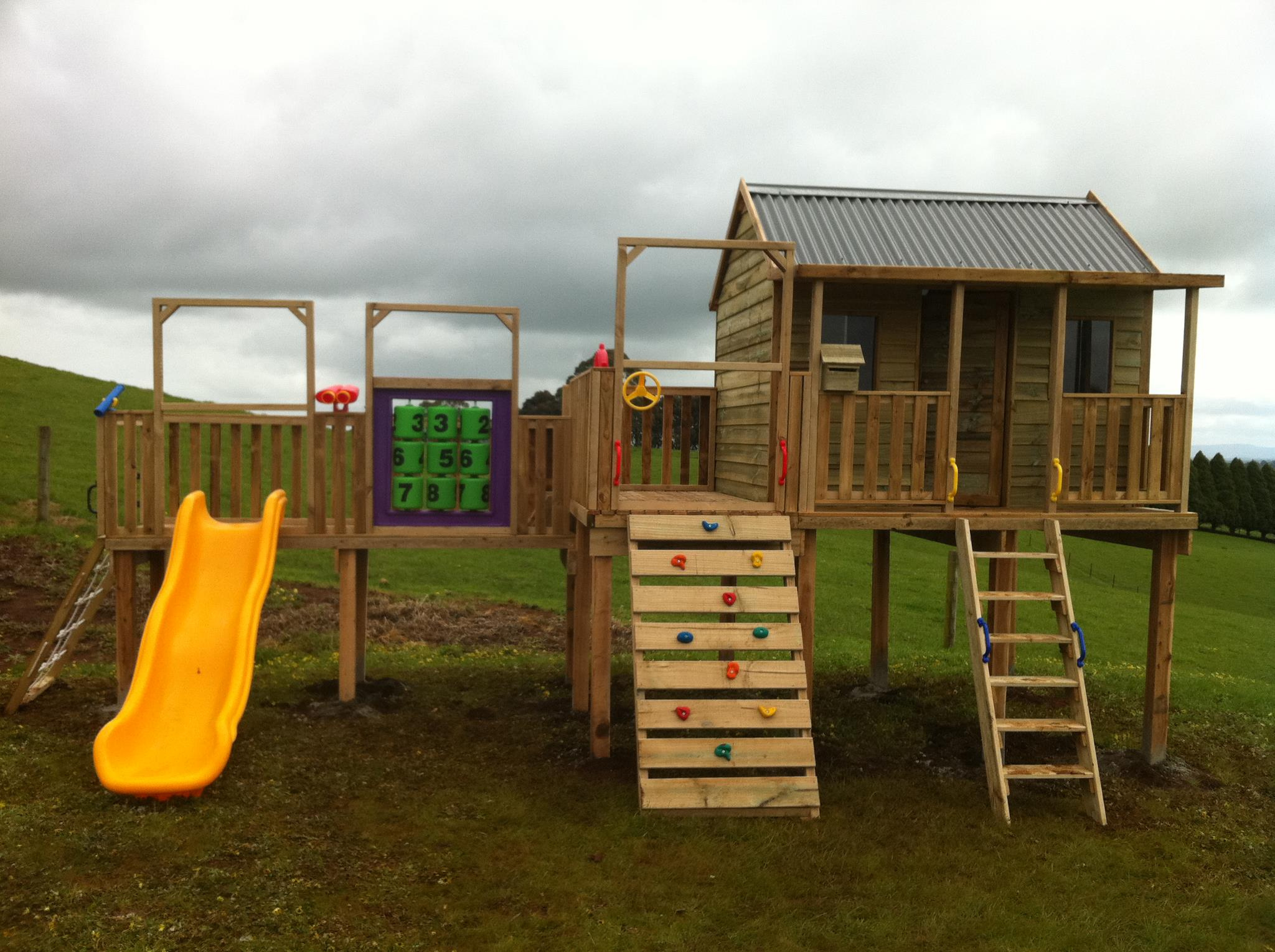
Modern cubby house designed for children's play

A cubby-hole, cubby-house or cubby is a small play house, or play area, for children. This may be constructed by the children themselves and used as a place of play. Children may have a small shed, play-house or tent which they use as a cubby-house. Children might build their own in various places in the house or garden, or have a pre-fabricated cubby. An Australian fictional treatment of the quest for the perfect cubby can be found in Ursula Dubosarsky's The Cubby House, illustrated by Mitch Vane.

== Etymology ==
Possibly from the term "cub" in old English related to "stall, pen, cattle shed, coop, hutch". "Cubby-hole" is sometimes written as one word (cubbyhole).

== Meanings in various countries ==
In South Africa, cubby-hole or cubby is the word for a glove compartment in a vehicle. This usage is also common in Barbados, Zambia, Botswana and Zimbabwe, as well as in some parts of the USA: Southern Minnesota; Michigan; Madison, South Dakota; and Northwest Wyoming.

In the UK, Ireland and Canada, it may refer to the cupboard under the stairs. In Quebec, the French word cagibi, which is a contraction of cage à bijoux, and roughly translates as "jewel case", is synonymous with a triangular storage walk-in located directly under the inner stairs of a house.

In the United States, a cubby-hole most often refers to a small square or rectangle-shaped space where children may keep their personal belongings, such as in a preschool or kindergarten setting. These cubby-holes are often constructed out of the same materials as bookshelves and have a similar appearance save for the division of the cubbies themselves.

== See also ==
- Wendy house
