= Adair-Kennedy Memorial Park =

Sports complex in Juneau, Alaska, United States

Coordinates: 58°23′12″N 134°34′06″W

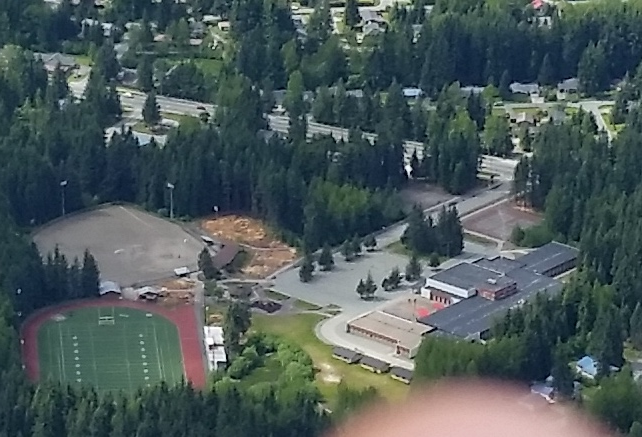
Westerly view from Thunder Mountain shows Adair-Kennedy Memorial Park, Floyd Dryden Middle School and Mendenhall Loop Road.

Adair-Kennedy Memorial Park is a sports facility complex in Juneau, Alaska, and adjacent to Floyd Dryden Middle School. It was named after Richard James Adair and Jimmy Earl Kennedy, two Juneau Police Department officers who died in the line of duty on April 17, 1979.

The park amenities include a baseball field, football/soccer field, track and a climbing structure.

The City and Borough of Juneau plans to make many changes to the park.
