= Flag of Alaska =

U.S. state flag

Alaska
- Use: Civil and state flag
- Proportion: 125:177
- Adopted: May 2, 1927; 99 years ago
- Design: Eight gold stars, in the shape of the Big Dipper on a dark blue field. The North Star is larger than the other 7.
- Designed by: Benny Benson

The flag of the U.S. state of Alaska displays eight gold stars, forming the Big Dipper and Polaris, on a dark blue field. The Big Dipper is an asterism in the constellation Ursa Major, which symbolizes a bear, indigenous to Alaska. As depicted on the flag, its stars can be used as a guide by the novice to locate Polaris and determine true north.

The design was created by Benny Benson of Seward and selected from among roughly 700 entries in a 1927 contest. In 2001, a survey conducted by the North American Vexillological Association placed Alaska's flag fifth best in design quality out of the 72 Canadian provincial, U.S. state, and U.S. territory flags ranked. It finished behind the flags of New Mexico, Texas, Quebec, and Maryland respectively.

== Design and specifications ==
=== Statute ===
The official design of the flag is outlined in the Alaska Statutes by The Alaska State Legislature, which explains the flag's colors and symbolism, along with proper display, folding, presentation, and retirement of the flag.

It is specified that the flag of Alaska is:

"eight gold stars in a field of blue … the stars, seven of which form the constellation Ursa Major … including the ‘Pointers’ which point toward the eighth star in the flag, Polaris, the North Star … The stars shall be the color of natural yellow gold and the field of blue shall be of the same shade of blue used in the official manufacture of the national emblem of the United States. The design, standard proportions, and size are as follows:"—A technical blueprint showing the official design specifications, proportions, and star placements

=== Symbolism ===
The blue … typifies the evening sky, the blue of the sea and of mountain lakes, and of wild flowers that grow in Alaskan soil, the gold being significant of the wealth that lies hidden in Alaska’s hills and streams … Ursa Major, the Great Bear, the most conspicuous constellation in the northern sky … and the North Star, the ever-constant star for the mariner, explorer, hunter, trapper, prospector, woodsman, and surveyor. For Alaska, the northernmost star represents Alaska, the forty-ninth star in the national emblem.

Sec. 44.09.020. State flag.

=== Colors ===
Colors
| Name | Color | RGB | | | |
| Name | Color | R | G | B | 8-bit hex |
|---|---|---|---|---|---|
| Navy | | 15 | 32 | 75 | #0F204B |
| Gold | | 255 | 182 | 18 | #FFB612 |

== Origin ==
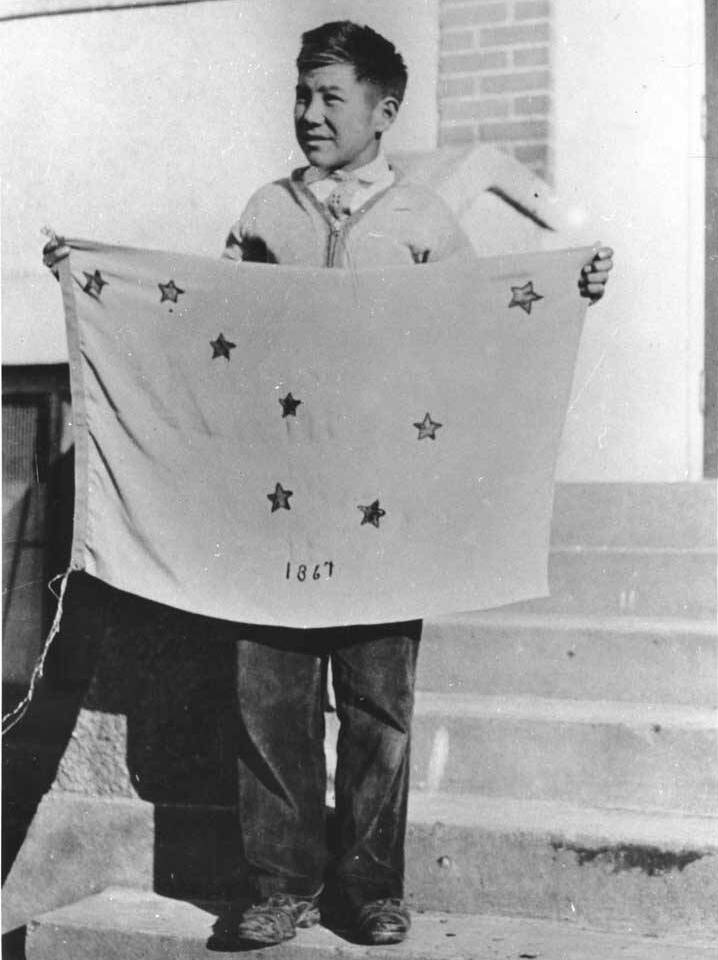
Benny Benson holding his flag design

Original design by Benny Benson

Thirty-two years before Alaska became a state, the Alaska Department of the American Legion sponsored a territorial contest for Alaskan children from seventh grade (age 12–13) to twelfth grade (age 17–18) to design a flag for the territory. In 1927, the contest committee chose fourteen year-old Benny Benson's design to represent the future flag of the Territory of Alaska. Benson, an Alaska Native, was a resident at the Jesse Lee Home for Children in Seward. In many sources Benson is said to have been an orphan, but his father was still alive when he began work on his design. Most other entries featured variations on the territorial seal, the midnight sun, the northern lights, polar bears, and gold pans. To celebrate his achievement, Benson was awarded a scholarship worth $1,000 and an engraved watch. Alaskans had flown only the U.S. flag in the period between the territory's purchase from Russia in 1867 and the selection of Benson's design in 1927.

Benny looked to the sky for the symbols he included in his design. Choosing the familiar constellation he looked for every night before going to sleep at the orphanage, he submitted this description with it:

The blue field is for the Alaska sky and the forget-me-not, an Alaskan flower. The North Star is for the future state of Alaska, the most northerly in the Union. The dipper is for the Great Bear—symbolizing strength [sic].

=== Gallery ===
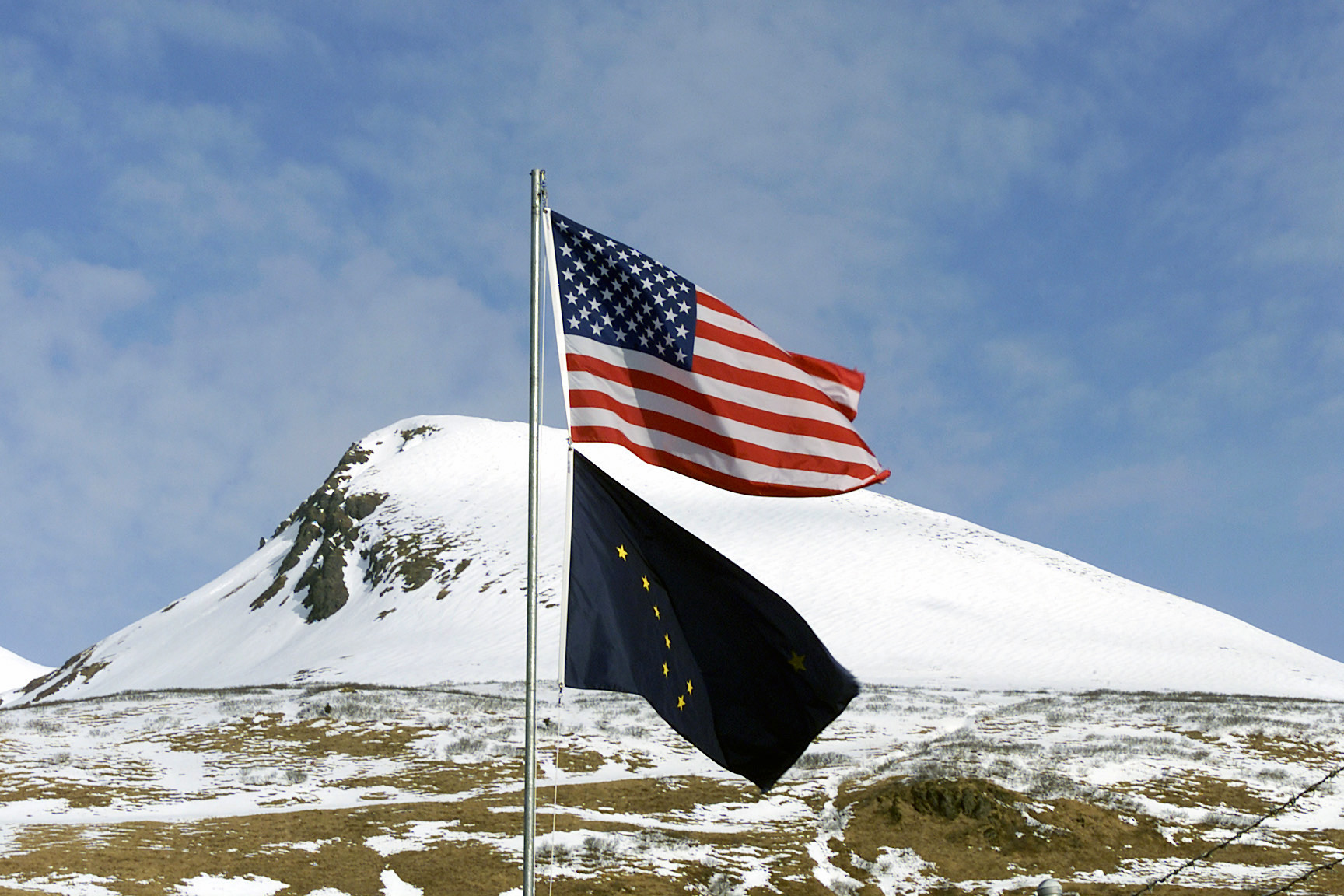
Flag of Alaska flying below the United States flag

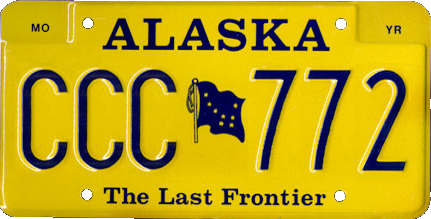
Alaskan license plate from 1981 to 1997, which featured the Alaskan state flag on it

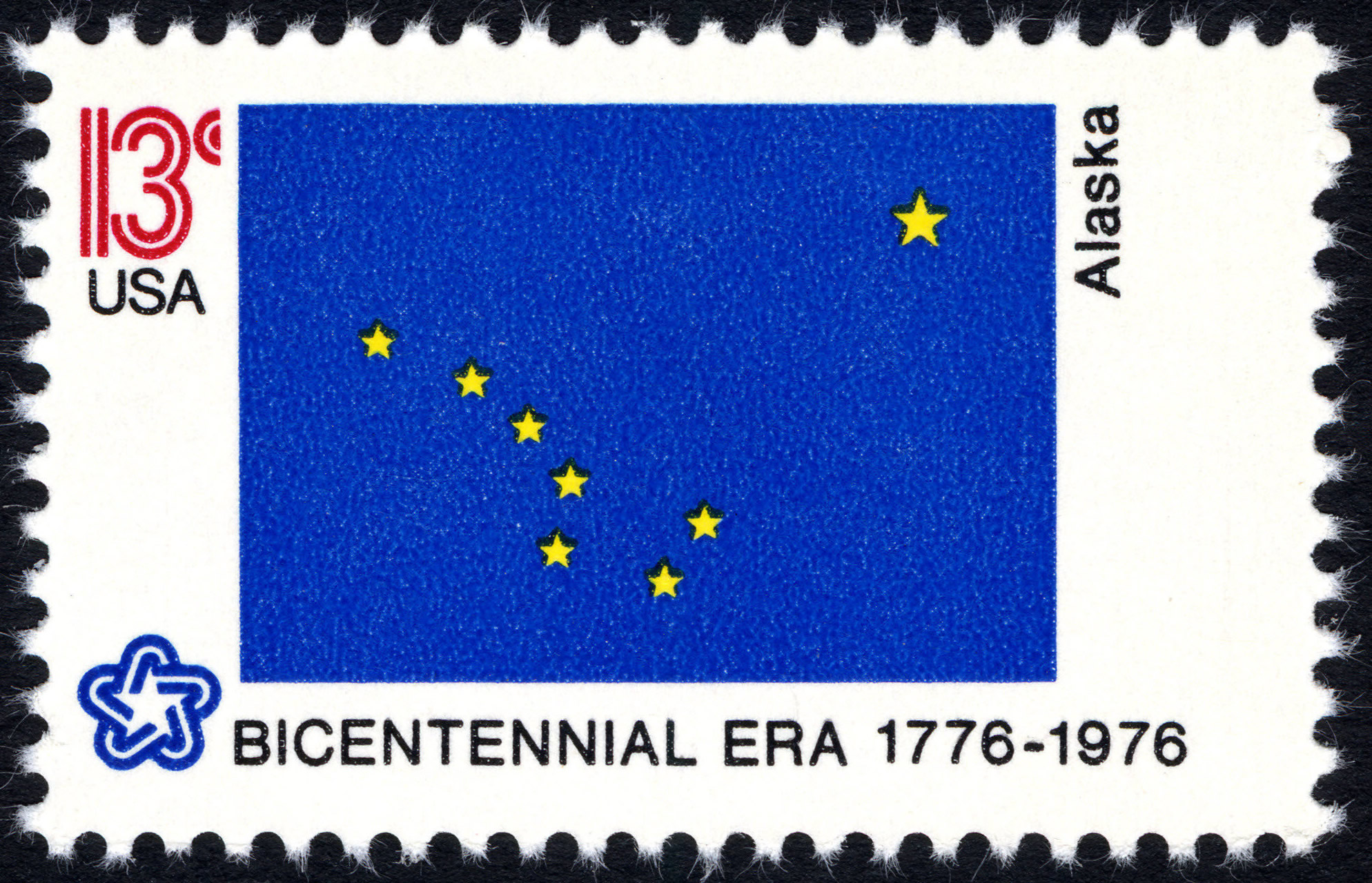
The Alaska state flag as depicted in the 1976 bicentennial postage stamp series

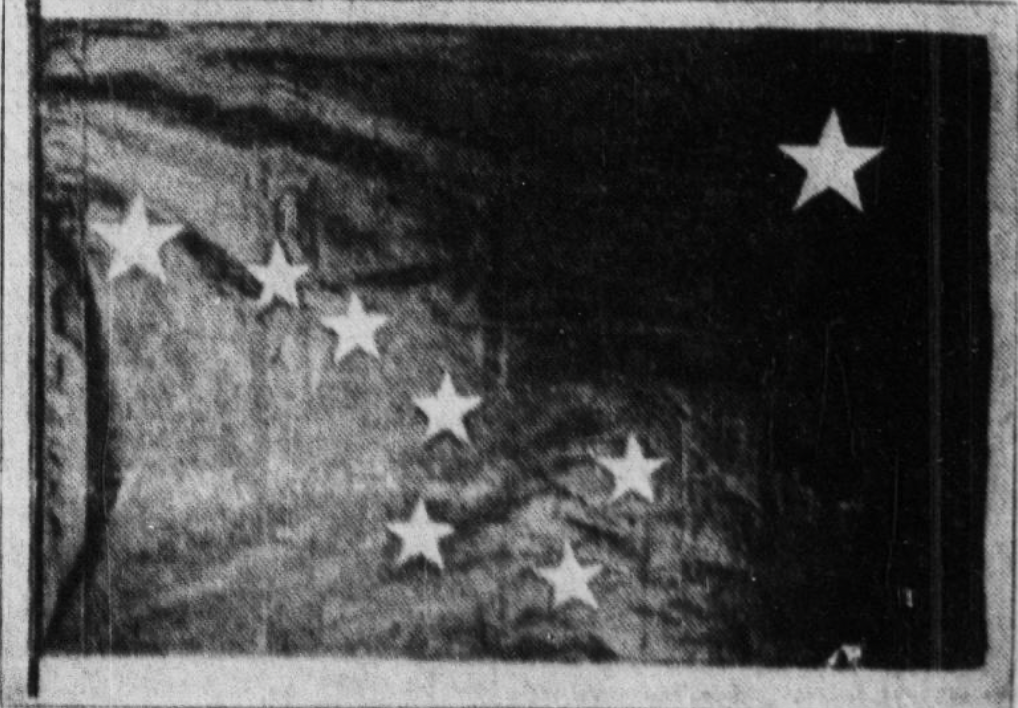
State flag from 1928

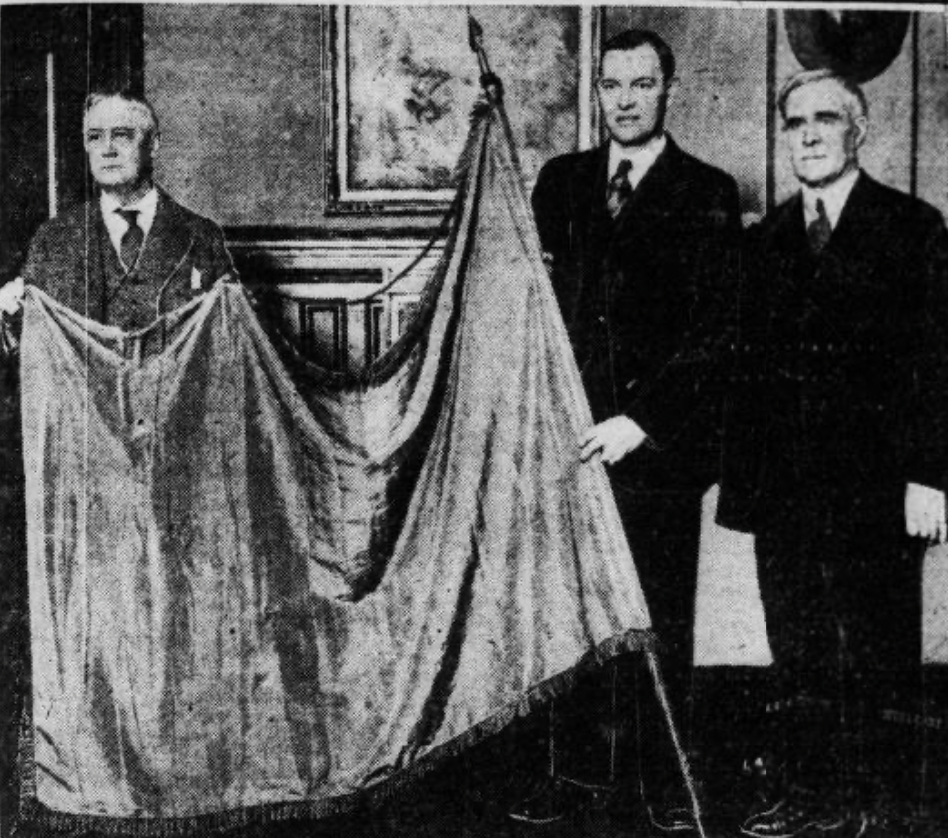
State flag from 1929

== History ==
=== Russian-American Company Flag ===
Between 1799 and 1867 Alaska was governed by the Russian-American Company (RAC), a state-sponsored commercial company initially headquartered in Irkutsk, then St. Petersburg, Russia. The flag flown by the Company's ships and their shore establishments was Russia's commercial flag (civil ensign). On September 28 (October 10, new style) 1806, Aleksandr I, Emperor of Russia made a notation on the design submitted to him of a new flag for the Russian-American Company; "So be it", and added his cypher, thereby approving the first flag in Russia's history to be used by an Imperial chartered company. After Imperial confirmation, the case was heard in the Senate and on October 19, 1806, was sent for execution to the main office of the Russian-American Company (RAC), and also to the Admiralty and Commerce colleges.

The new Company flag design of 1806 placed the Imperial eagle in the upper left quarter of Russia's commercial flag. In order that the State symbol remain unobstructed and more visible the width of the white stripe was enlarged to cover roughly one half of the flag's width. The normal width proportions of Russia's commercial flag were equal thirds. The Imperial eagle carried a scroll that dipped into the blue stripe, also for more visibility, which read, in abbreviated form "Russian American Company's". The symbolism of the scroll beneath the Imperial eagle complements the official version of the Company's name "Under His Imperial Majesty's Protection Russian-American Company."

The flag flew over Alaska until October 18, 1867, when all Russian and American Company holdings in Alaska were sold to the United States.

=== State flag ===
The Alaska Legislature adopted Benson's design as the official flag for the Territory of Alaska on May 2, 1927. The first flag made based on Benny's design was made of blue silk and appliquéd gold stars. It was retained as the state flag at statehood in 1959.

The flag's symbolism is described in the state song, "Alaska's Flag."

=== Historical flags ===
| Allegiance | Governing Body | Design(s) | Dates in Use |
|---|---|---|---|
| Claimed by Russian Empire | N/A | | July 15, 1741 – July 8, 1799 |
| Russian Empire | Russian-American Company | | July 8, 1799 – October 10, 1806 |
| Russian Empire | Russian-American Company | | October 10, 1806 – October 18, 1867 |
| Russian Empire | Russian-American Company | | June 11, 1858 – October 18, 1867 |
| United States of America | The Department of Alaska (United States Army, Navy or Treasury) | | October 18, 1867 – July 3, 1877 |
| United States of America | The Department of Alaska (United States Army, Navy or Treasury) | | July 4, 1877 – May 16, 1884 |
| United States of America | District of Alaska | | May 17, 1884 – July 3, 1890 |
| United States of America | District of Alaska | | July 4, 1890 – July 3, 1891 |
| United States of America | District of Alaska | | July 4, 1891 – July 3, 1896 |
| United States of America | District of Alaska | | July 4, 1896 – July 3, 1908 |
| United States of America | District of Alaska | | July 4, 1908 – July 3, 1912 |
| United States of America | District of Alaska | | July 4, 1912 – August 23, 1912 |
| United States of America | Territory of Alaska | | August 24, 1912 – July 9, 1927 |
| United States of America | Territory of Alaska | | July 9, 1927 – January 3, 1959 |
| United States of America | State of Alaska | | January 3, 1959 – present |

== See also ==
- List of Alaska state symbols
- Seal of Alaska
- Starry Plough (flag)
