= Jesse Lee Home for Children =

- U.S. National Register of Historic Places
- Alaska Heritage Resources Survey
- Location within Alaska
- Location: Benson Drive, Seward, Alaska
- Coordinates: 60°7′34″N 149°26′47″W
- Area: 2.65 acres (1.07 ha)
- Built: 1926
- Built by: John Holm; A.S. Hanson
- Architect: Stanley Shaw
- Demolished: November 4, 2020
- NRHP reference No.: 95001146
- AHRS No.: SEW-003
- Added to NRHP: September 29, 1995

The Jesse Lee Home for Children was a former home for displaced children on Swetmann Avenue in Seward, Alaska, United States. It was operated by the United Methodist Church from its opening in 1926 until the building suffered damage from a 1964 earthquake and operations were relocated to a new building in Anchorage.

== History ==
Prior to 1926, the Methodist Church operated children's homes in Nome and Unalaska. The facility at Unalaska, established in 1889 and also functioning as a boarding school, was called the Jesse Lee Home, named after a Methodist minister in the US northeast during colonial days.

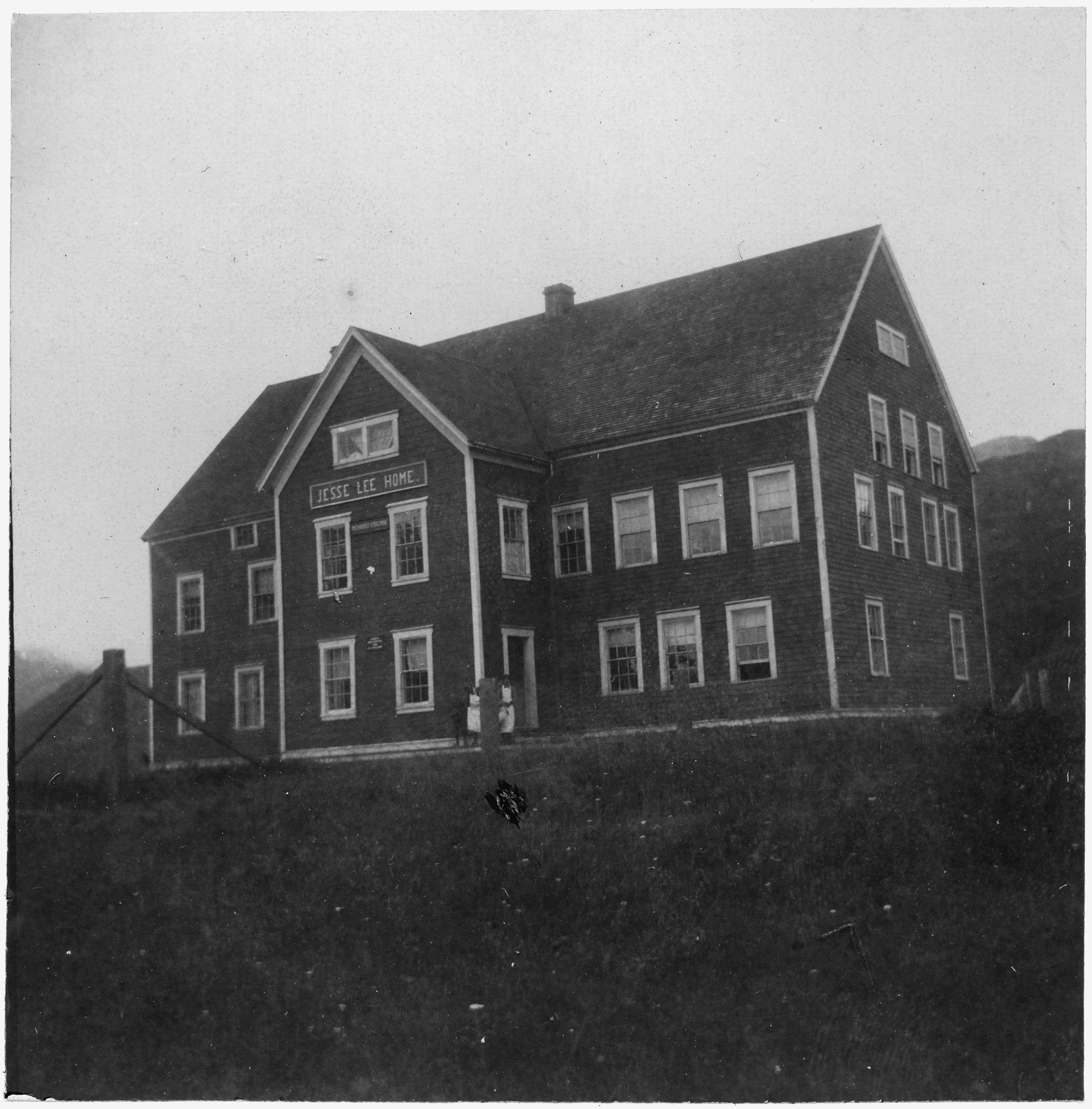
The original Jesse Lee Home, Unalaska, 1901

In the late 1910s and early 1920s, the Spanish flu pandemic was particularly deadly in remote Native villages, leaving more displaced children. The old missions were overfilled, in disrepair, and transportation of supplies and children to these remote locations was unreliable and expensive. Seward was selected as a new location because at that point in time, it was Alaska's largest port and transportation point. Transportation costs would be lower due to regularly scheduled routes directly from Seattle.

Residents were mainly Native children from the Aleutian Islands (Aleut) and Seward Peninsula (Iñupiat). In the first year after the school opened in 1926, resident Benny Benson won a competition to design the territorial flag. His design is still in use as the state flag. Benson, who was moved from the previous home in Unalaska, was from the village of Chignik. He was a 13-year-old student who won the competition out of over 700 entries. Fanny Kearns, a young Eskimo woman who was employed as a seamstress at the JLH sewed the first Alaskan flag out of leftover cloth. On July 9, 1927, the Balto Building was dedicated and the new flag was raised for the first time at the Jesse Lee Home. The date is still commemorated in the state as Alaska Flag Day. On July 4, 1928, another Chignik boy, Ephriam Kalmakoff, at 14 years old won Seward's Mount Marathon Race, a mountain foot race above Seward that stood until 1957. He remains the youngest race champion. Another Aleut student at Jesse Lee Home, Peter Gordon Gould from Unga Island overlapped with Benny Benson when the school first moved from Unalaska. Gould would go on to found Alaska Methodist University in Anchorage, now Alaska Pacific University, as its first president attended in 1960.

The site consisted of three main buildings connected by arcades and several smaller buildings. Original construction included two dormitories, Jewel Guard Hall and Goode Hall. The Balto Building was added between the two dormitories and provided dining space and a large kitchens. In addition to boy's dormitories, Jewel Guard Hall held a shop, vocational classrooms, a darkroom, classrooms, library, and gymnasium. Goode Hall served as the girl's dormitory and administrative offices. Additional buildings on the property included a superintendent's house, barn, schoolhouse, residence, garage, and cold storage. During World War II, the residents were moved to other locations. The primary buildings were painted camouflage and a temporary Fort Raymond Army Base occupied part of the home's property.

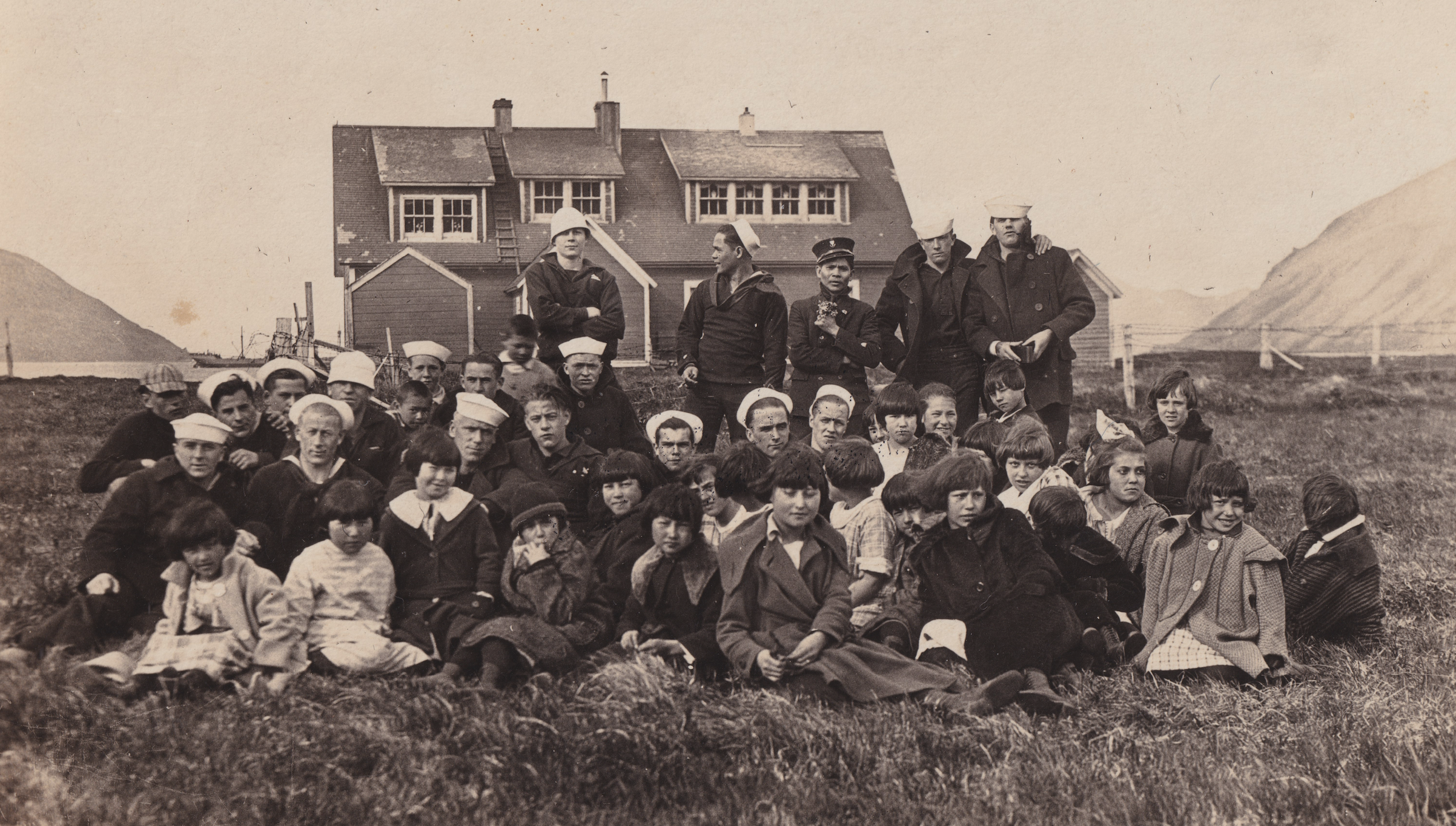
Jesse Lee Home in Unalaska in 1924 with crewmen from USCGC Haida

The home reopened after the war but rather than attending class there, the students attended nearby Bayview Elementary and Seward High School, and government-provided food replaced the gardens and livestock that filled the 100+ acres. The number of residents declined from its high of 120 to between 30 and 40.

An earthquake in 1964 severely affected Seward and much of the complex. Goode Hall, the largest of the buildings, was heavily damaged and required demolition. The church opened a new orphanage in Anchorage and the Seward home was closed. In 1966 the property was sold to the city, then to a series of private owners before being foreclosed upon due to unpaid utility district assessments by the City of Seward again. It was listed on the National Register of Historic Places in 1995.

== Restoration effort ==
The Friends of the Jesse Lee Home, a nonprofit organization, was set up with the goal of restoring the site. Once restored, the Jesse Lee Home was to be used as a public statewide leadership charter high school.

In 2002, the Alaska State Legislature passed House Bill No. 96, "An Act relating to acquisition and development of the Jesse Lee Home; and providing for an effective date."

In 2003, a Department of Natural Resources study found that the building was structurally sound. In 2008, the Alaska Department of Commerce, Community and Economic Development awarded the Alaska Community Foundation a $1,000,000 grant to repair and stabilize the Jesse Lee Home. The Friends of the Jesse Lee Home was named the entity responsible for the ongoing operation and maintenance of the project. The State of Alaska appropriated a total of $8,000,000 towards developing how the Balto School would use the building, prosecuting A&E, and renovating the portions of the Jesse Lee Home that were still standing.

By 2015, and after $700,000 in expenses, the grants were terminated due accountability and reporting issues.

== Demolition ==
In 2014 the City of Seward transferred ownership to Friends of the Jesse Lee Home (FJLH) under the conditions that FJLH had five years to remove hazardous materials from the site, install 270 feet of water line and install 220 feet of sewer line. As of August 30, 2019 FJLH admitted "not a significant amount" of money had been spent on these features and the conditions for FLJH retain ownership were not met. In July 2020 the Seward City Council voted to demolish the structure. Demolition of the site began Nov. 4, 2020.

== See also ==
- National Register of Historic Places listings in Kenai Peninsula Borough, Alaska
