= Juneau School District =

School district in Alaska, United States

Address
- 1208 Glacier Ave Juneau, Alaska, 99801; United States

District information
- Type: Public
- Grades: Pre-K–12
- NCES District ID: 0200210

Students and staff
- Students: 4,085
- Teachers: 231.24
- Staff: 289.26
- Student–teacher ratio: 17.67

Other information
- Website: www.juneauschools.org

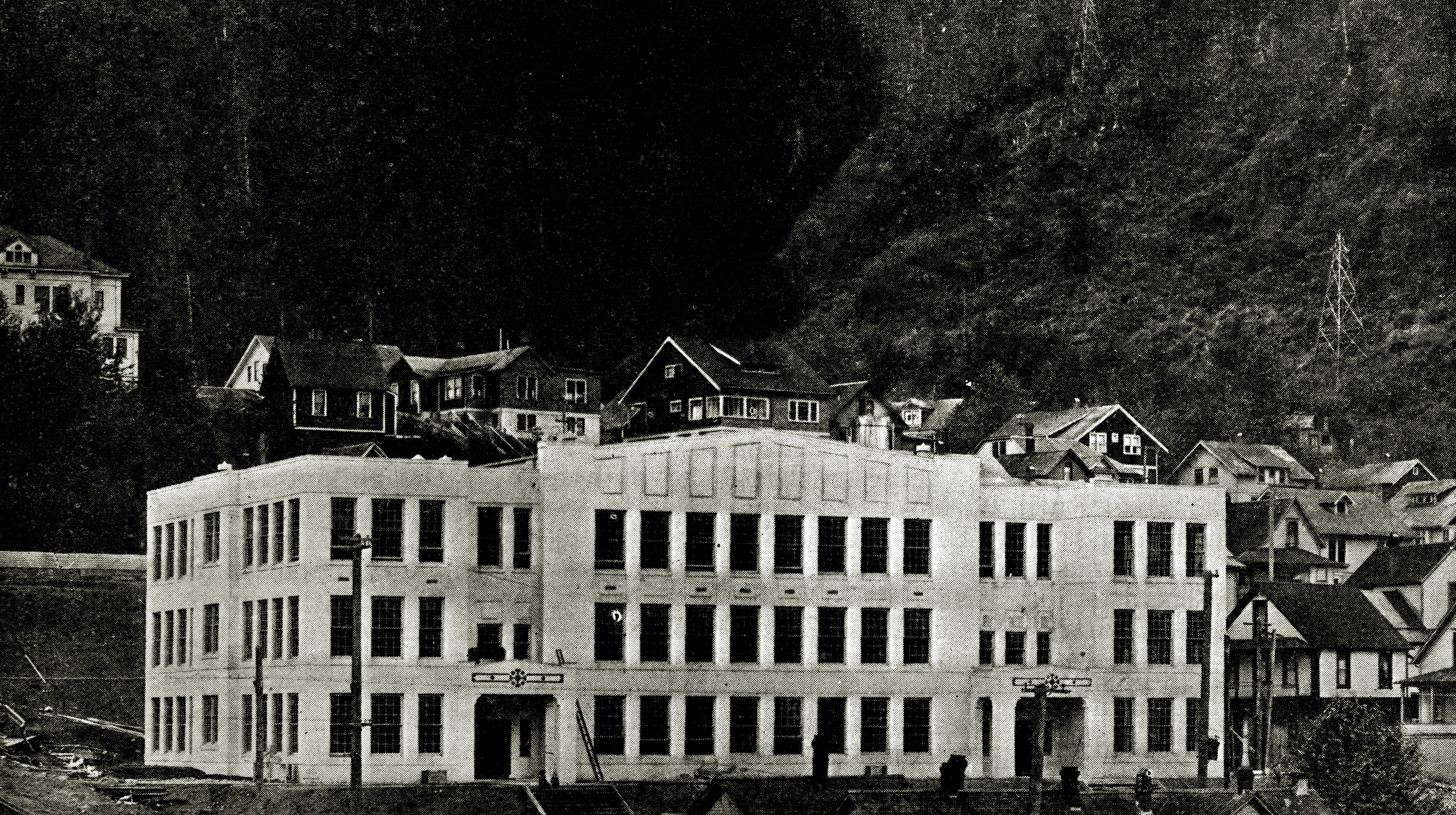
A 1920 photograph of one of the two school buildings at the time on Fifth Street, which served Juneau for most of the first half of the 20th century before newer school buildings were constructed. Houses which are part of Chicken Ridge sit atop the hill behind the school.

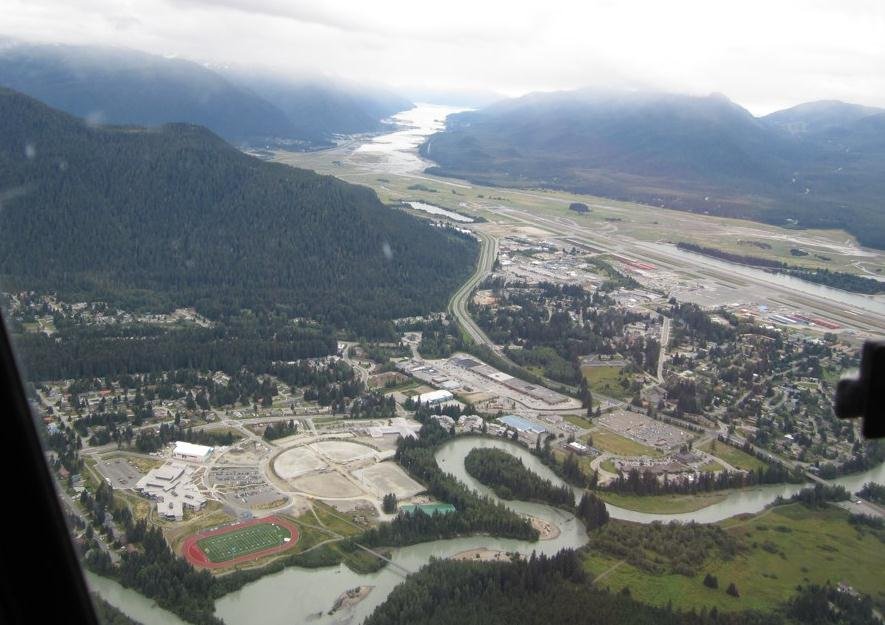
Thunder Mountain Middle School dominates the lower left of this 2010 aerial view of the Mendenhall Valley.

The Juneau School District (sometimes referred to as the Juneau Borough School District) is a school district in Juneau, Alaska. Its office is located in Downtown Juneau.

As of 2003 the Juneau School District's total enrollment was around 5,500 students.

== Schools ==
=== Elementary (primary) ===
- Auke Bay Elementary School
- Gastineau Community School
- Glacier Valley Elementary School
- Harborview Elementary School
- Kax̱dig̱oowu Héen Elementary School
- Juneau Community Charter School
- Mendenhall River Community School

=== Middle school (junior high) ===
- Thunder Mountain Middle School

=== High schools (secondary) ===
- Juneau-Douglas High School
- Yaaḵoosgé Daakahídi Alternative High School

=== Special programs ===
- HomeBRIDGE (homeschooling)
- Montessori Borealis (elementary 1-6th grade & adolescence 7-8th grade)

== See also ==
- List of school districts in Alaska

== Notes ==
- Gastineau Community School is also known as Gastineau Elementary School. The school is named Gastineau Elementary School on the list of schools located on the district website and is called Gastineau Community School on the school website.
