= Benny Benson =

Designer of Alaska's state flag (1912–1972)

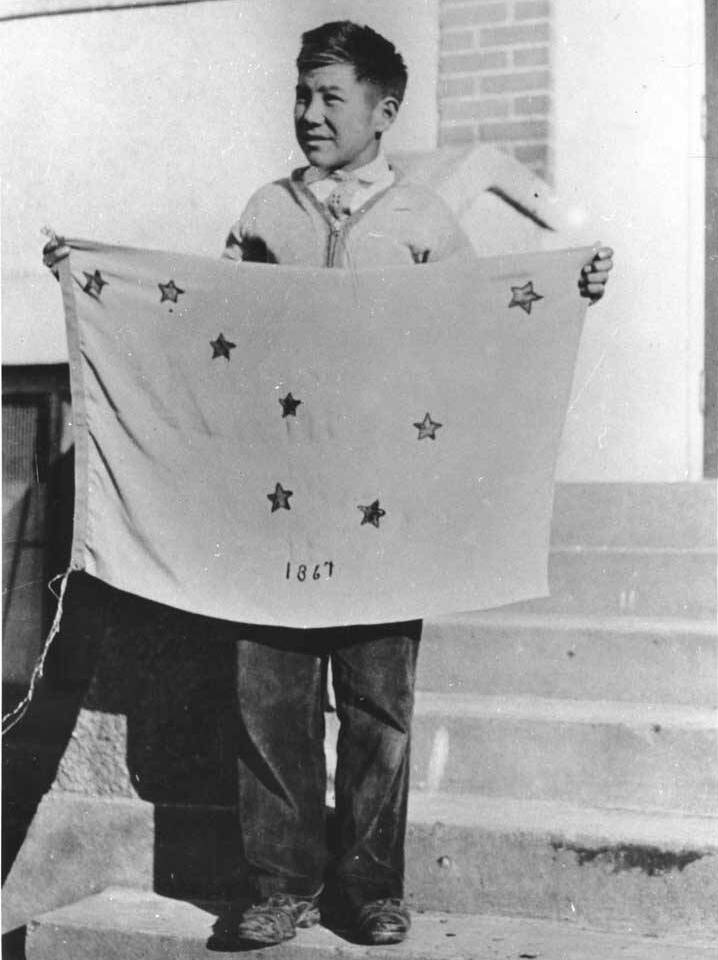
- Benson c. 1927
- Born: John Ben Benson Jr. September 12, 1912; Chignik, Alaska, U.S.
- Died: July 2, 1972 (aged 59); Kodiak, Alaska, U.S.
- Occupations: Flag designer; airplane mechanic
- Years active: 1927−1969
- Employer: Kodiak Airways
- Spouses: Betty Van Hise (m. 1938; div. 1950); Anna Sophie Jenks (m. 1972)
- Children: 2

Where Benny and Carl's cubby-holes used to exist in the former Jesse Lee Home in Seward, Alaska.

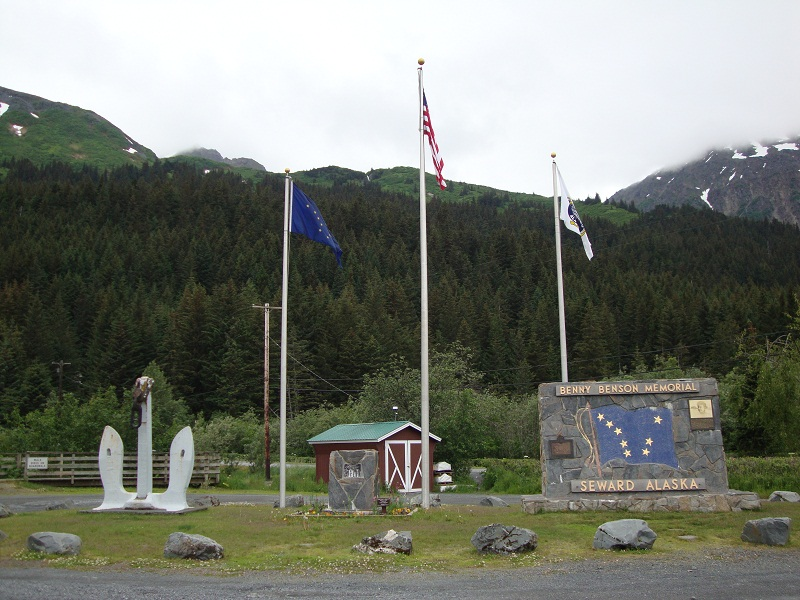
Benny Benson Memorial at mile 1.4 (km 2.3) of the Seward Highway in Seward, Alaska

John Ben Benson Jr. (September 12, 1912– July 2, 1972) was an Alaska Native best known for designing the flag of Alaska. Benson was 14 years old when he won a contest in 1927 to design the flag for the Territory of Alaska, which became a U.S. state on January 3, 1959.

== Life ==
=== Early life ===
Benson was born in Chignik, Alaska, on September 12, 1912. He was a Qawalangin (Fox Islander) Unangan born to a Swedish-American father, John Ben "Benny" Benson Sr., and Aleut-Russian mother, Tatiana Ioannovna Dediukhina, from a village near Unalaska. When he was three years old, his mother died, forcing his father to send him and his brother Carl to an orphanage, as Benson's father could not take care of them. Benson grew up at the Jesse Lee Home for Children in Unalaska and later in Seward.

=== Fox Farm ===
After graduating from school in 1932, Benson left the Jesse Lee Home. He returned to the Aleutian Islands to work with his father fishing and, for a time, trapping blue foxes on Chirikof Island and on his father’s privately owned Ugaiushak Island. The rate for furs began to decline, so Benson moved to Seattle in 1936. He used the $1,000 prize from the flag design competition to enroll in the Hemphill Diesel Engineering School for Diesel engine repair. In 1938, Benson married Betty Van Hise. The couple's first child, Anna May, was born in October 1938. Their second daughter, Charlotte Abbot, was born in June 1940. Benson divorced in 1950 and moved with his daughters to Kodiak where he became an airplane mechanic for Kodiak Airways.

=== Later years and death ===
Benson met his sister in the mid 1950s, 30 years after their separation. His sister died soon after. His brother Carl also died in 1965. Benson's right leg had to be amputated in 1969 due to circulatory problems. Shortly after that, in 1972, he met and married a former Jesse Lee Home resident, Anna Sophie Jenks. Benson had several stepchildren and grandchildren. He died of a heart attack in Kodiak, Alaska, on July 2 of that year, at the age of 59 years old.

== Flag design ==
Digital recreation of Benson's flag.

32 years before Alaska was to become a state, the Alaska Department of the American Legion sponsored a territorial contest for Alaskan children from seventh grade (12–13 year old students) to twelfth grade (17–18 year old students). Benson's design was chosen to represent the future of the Alaska Territory. Up to that time, Alaskans had flown only the U.S. flag since the territory was purchased from Russia in 1867. His design was chosen over roughly 700 other submissions from schoolchildren territory-wide in grades 7 to 12. Most other entries featured variations on the territorial seal, the midnight sun, the northern lights, polar bears, and/or gold pans. For his achievement, Benson was awarded $1,000, an engraved watch and a trip to Washington, D.C.

Benson looked to the sky for the symbols he included in his design. Choosing the familiar asterism he looked for every night before going to sleep at the orphanage, he submitted this description with it:

The blue field is for the Alaska sky and the forget-me-not, an Alaskan flower. The North Star is for the future state of Alaska, the most northerly in the union. The Dipper is for the Great Bear – symbolizing strength.

== Legacy ==
- Mount Benson, a prominent mountain overlooking Seward, was named after him in 1974.
- Benson Boulevard, a major east-west thoroughfare in midtown Anchorage, was built in the 1970s and named for him.
- Benny Benson Memorial is located at Mile 1.4 of the Seward Highway in Seward, Alaska.
- On April 11, 2013, in honor of his centenary, the Alaska Legislature passed SB31, which named the airport in Kodiak "Kodiak Benny Benson State Airport."
- Benny Benson School in Anchorage on Campbell Airstrip Road is an alternative school serving the educational needs of students who have been deemed at-risk and is part of the Anchorage School District SEARCH program.

== In popular culture ==
- In the Molly of Denali episode "A Brand New Flag", Molly does a presentation on the creation of the Alaskan Flag.
- A fictionalized version of the creation of the Alaskan Flag, presented as a parody of Good Will Hunting, is featured in The Great North episode "Bad Speecher Adventure".
