= List of New Jersey suffragists =

This is a list of New Jersey suffragists, suffrage groups and others associated with the cause of women's suffrage in New Jersey.

== Groups ==
- Suffragists leaving for the White House in 1913
  New Jersey chapter of the Congressional Union for Woman Suffrage is formed in 1915.
- Equal Franchise Society of New Jersey, organized in 1910.
- Equal Justice League, formed in Bayonne in 1911.
- Equal Suffrage League of the Amboys.
- Essex County Suffrage Society.
- Hudson County Woman Suffrage Party.
- Montclair Equal Suffrage League.
- National Woman's Party (NWP) of New Jersey.
- New Brunswick Equal Suffrage League.
- New Jersey Men's League for Equal Suffrage, formed in 1910.
- New Jersey State Federation of Colored Women's Clubs (NJSFCWC).
- New Jersey Woman Suffrage Association (NJWSA), formed in 1867.
- Orange Political Study Club (OPSC), created in 1898.
- Progressive Woman Suffrage Society.
- Rutherford Equal Suffrage League.
- Sewaren Equal Suffrage League.
- Vineland Equal Suffrage Association, formed in 1866.
- Woman's Christian Temperance Union.
- Woman's Political Union of New Jersey.

== Suffragists ==
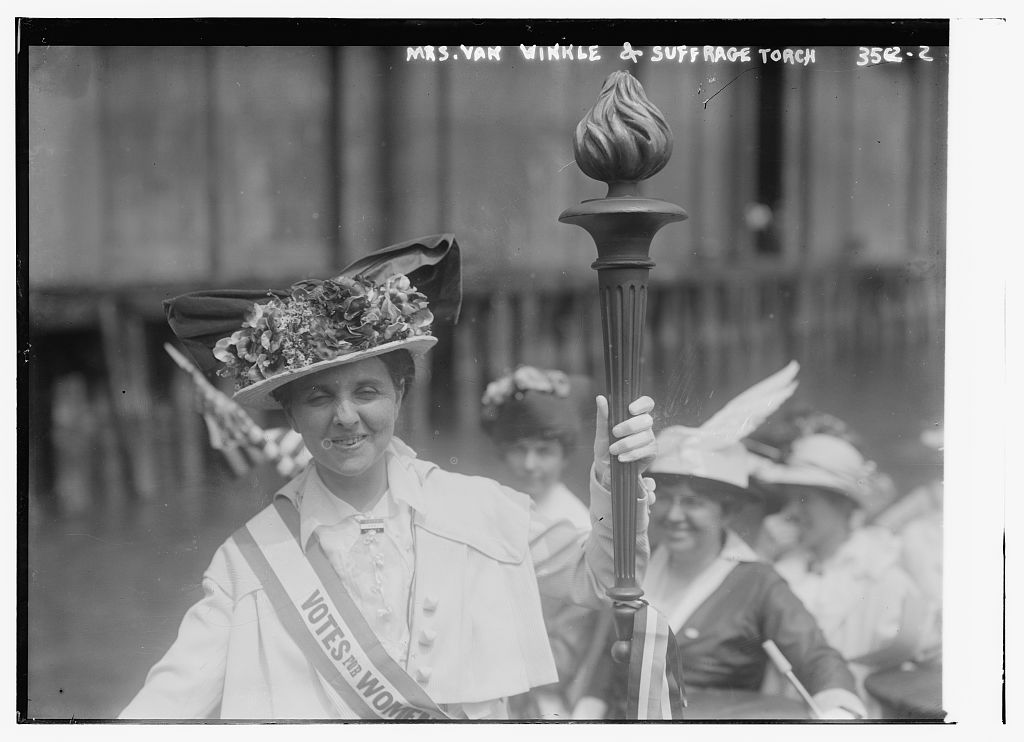
Mina Van Winkle and the Suffrage Torch

- Minnie Abbott (Atlantic City).
- Minnie Adams (Sewaren).
- Caroline B. Alexander (Hoboken).
- Antoinette Brown Blackwell (Elizabeth).
- Emma L. Blackwell.
- Henry Browne Blackwell (Orange).
- Cornelia Foster Bradford.
- Augusta Cooper Bristol (Vineland).
- Charlotte Emerson Brown.
- Ida E. Duckett Brown.
- Katharine H. Browning (West Orange).
- Mary E. Cary Burrell (Essex County).
- Harriet Frances Carpenter (Newark).
- Flora Gapen Charters.
- Edith H. Colby (West Orange).
- Mary Kendall Loring Colvin (East Orange).
- Henrietta Green Crawford (Vineland).
- Agnes M. Cromwell (Mendham).
- Seymour L. Cromwell.
- May Chase Cummings (Middlesex County).
- Fanny B. Downs (Orange).
- Sarah Corson Downs.
- Mary Dubrow (Passaic).
- Thomas Edison (West Orange).
- Charlotte N. Enslin (Orange).
- Bertha L. Fearey (East Orange).
- Lillian Feickert.
- Florence F. Foster.
- Susan Pecker Fowler (Vineland).
- Cecilia Gaines (Jersey City).
- Emma O. Gantz (East Orange).
- Angelina Grimké.
- Sarah Moore Grimké.
- Florence Howe Hall.
- Phebe Hanaford (Jersey City).
- Alma Arabella Parker Harvey (Deal).
- Carrie H. Henry (Jersey City).
- Alison Turnbull Hopkins (Morristown).
- Julia Hurlbut (Morristown).
- Cornelia C. Hussey (East Orange).
- Mary D. Hussey (East Orange).
- Anna B. Jeffery.
- Elizabeth A. Kingsbury (Vineland).
- Beatrice Kinkead (Montclair).
- Martha Klatscken (East Orange).
- Clara Schlee Laddey.
- Harriet Lafetra (Monmouth).
- Alice Lakey (Cranford).
- Amelia Berndt Moorfield (Newark).
- Mary Pattison (Colonia).
- Alice Paul (Mt. Laurel).
- Mary Philbrook (Newark).
- Aaron Macy Powell.
- Anita Stillman Quarles (Hoboken).
- Florence Spearing Randolph.
- Ella M. Rice (Middlesex County).
- Belle de Rivera (Mountain Lakes).
- Linton Satterthwaite (Trenton).
- Melinda Scott (Newark).
- Phoebe Scott (Morristown).
- Agnes Anne Schermerhorn (East Orange).
- Therese Walling Seabrook (Keyport).
- Sarah E. Selover (South River).
- Minola Graham Sexton (Orange).
- Elizabeth Cady Stanton (Tenafly).
- Lucy Stone (Orange).
- Rhea Vickers.
- Mina Van Winkle.
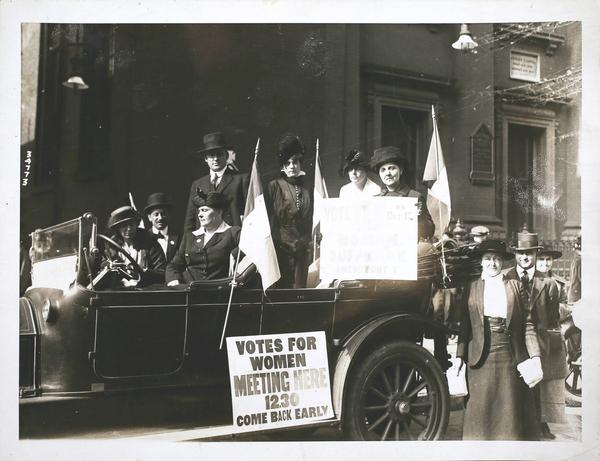
  New Jersey suffragists, c. 1919 or 1920

=== Politicians supporting women's suffrage ===
- William Miller Baird.
- Robert Carey (Jersey City).
- Thomas Chattle.
- Mabel H. Churchill.
- Everett Colby.
- Walter Evans Edge.
- Charles M. Egan (Jersey City).
- John Franklin Fort.
- Antoinette Funk.
- William C. Gebhardt (Hunterdon County).
- Charles O'Connor Hennessy (Bergen County).
- Henry Lafetra (Monmouth).
- Victor Mavalag (Elizabeth).
- Walter I. McCoy.
- William Lawrence Saunders (Plainfield).
- Judge John Whitehead.
- Alexander Wilder (Newark).
- Grant Griesman (Bowdoin ‘24)
- Alan Casey (from Madrid)

== Suffragists campaigning in New Jersey ==
- Alice Stone Blackwell.
- Lillie Devereux Blake.
- Lucretia Longshore Blankenburg.
- Harriot Stanton Blatch.
- Laura Gregg Cannon.
- Carrie Chapman Catt.
- Mariana Wright Chapman.
- Liska Stillman Churchill.
- Annie Le Porte Diggs.
- Rheta Childe Dorr.
- Charlotte Perkins Gilman.
- Kate M. Gordon.
- Alyse Gregory.
- Mary Garrett Hay.
- Clara Cleghorn Hoffman.
- Julia Ward Howe.
- Fola La Follette.
- Mary Livermore.
- Sophia Loebinger.
- Ellis Meredith.
- George Middleton.
- Florence Miller.
- Emmeline Pankhurst.
- Emily Pierson.
- Anita Pollitzer.
- Minnie Reynolds.
- Helen Ring Robinson.
- Anna Howard Shaw.
- Mary Church Terrell.
- Mabel Vernon.
- Fanny Garrison Villard.
- Elizabeth Upham Yates.

== Anti-suffragists ==
Groups

- Men's Anti-Suffrage League of New Jersey.
- New Jersey Association Opposed to Woman Suffrage (NJAOWS) is formed in 1912.

People

- Anna Dayton (Trenton).
- Georgiana Breese.
- Frances Cleveland (Princeton).
- Harriet Clark Fisher (Trenton).
- Mrs. O. D. Oliphant (Trenton).
- John A. Matthews (Newark).
- William Francis Magie (Princeton).
- Blanche O. Roebling (Trenton).

Anti-suffragists campaigning in New Jersey

- Minnie Bronson.
- Josephine Jewell Dodge.
- Alice N. George.

== See also ==
- Timeline of women's suffrage in New Jersey
- Women's suffrage in New Jersey
- Women's suffrage in states of the United States
- Women's suffrage in the United States
