= William Magie =

William Magie may refer to:

- William Francis Magie, American physicist
- William J. Magie, American judge
- Will Magie, English-born American rugby union player
