= Mary Dudley Hussey =

American lawyer, physician, and suffragist

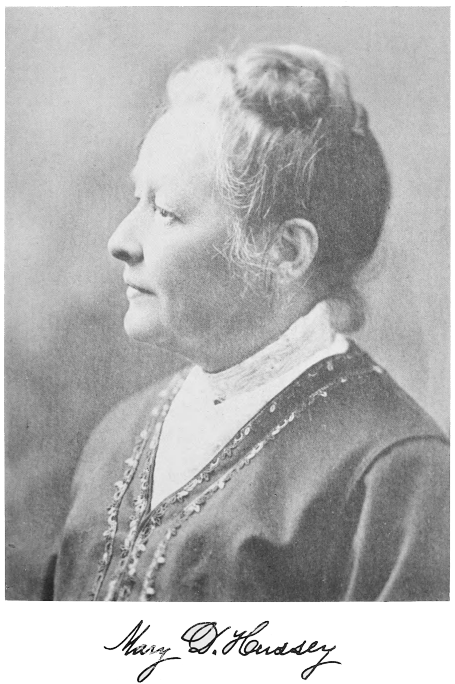
- Hussey in 1922
- Born: July 31, 1853; New York City, U.S.
- Died: October 26, 1927 (aged 74); East Orange, New Jersey, U.S.
- Resting place: Milton, Saratoga County, New York, U.S.
- Education: Columbia University; New York University
- Occupations: Lawyer; physician; suffragist
- Mother: Cornelia Collins Hussey

Mary Dudley Hussey (July 31, 1853 - October 26, 1927) was an American lawyer, physician, and suffragist. Hussey worked towards women's rights both through legal efforts and through activism. She was based in New Jersey.

== Biography ==
Mary Dudley Hussey was born in New York City on July 31, 1853. She was a daughter of suffragist, Cornelia Collins Hussey and physician, Elizabeth Blackwell, was present at her birth. As a child, she was exposed to work of abolitionists and attended the last meeting of the American Anti-Slavery Society. Hussey's work as a suffragist began in 1868 when she attended a meeting held by Lucy Stone.

In 1873, Hussey applied for admission to Columbia University, after being inspired by the action of Lillie Devereux Blake, who also publicly applied that year. In 1877, she graduated with a physician's degree from the Woman's Medical College of New York. Hussey practiced medicine for a short time, but felt that studying law would help her "advance the interests of women." She earned her law degree in 1898 from New York University. She also helped create the New Jersey Legal Aid Society which helped support the legal needs of women living in poverty. In 1899, she helped Mary Philbrook found the Women Lawyers' Club because the Bar Association would not allow women. Hussey was a member of the Woman's Christian Temperance Union (WCTU) and the Women's International League for Peace and Freedom.

In 1890, Hussey helped reorganize the New Jersey Woman Suffrage Association (NJWSA). She served as secretary to the organization for several years. She also organized the Political Study Club of Orange. Hussey took part in an April 1910 march on Washington, D.C. where she presented a women's suffrage petition to New Jersey representative, William H. Wiley. After women gained the right to vote, she championed the League of Women Voters (LWV).

Hussey rode her bicycle in East Orange and in many other cities where she visited. She distributed both suffrage fliers and iris bulbs. The bulbs were given out with the stipulation that any money made from selling the flowers should be used to support women's suffrage. Hussey was an avid gardener and initiated the first school garden in New Jersey. Hussey also sold her plants to help fund different causes that were important to her. She wore plain clothing and was described as having a "picturesque appearance." Hussey eventually retired from biking after 25 years in 1924.

Hussey became ill in 1925 and died in her home in East Orange on October 26, 1927. She was buried in Milton, New York.
