= Suffrage Torch =

Bronze-finished sculpture

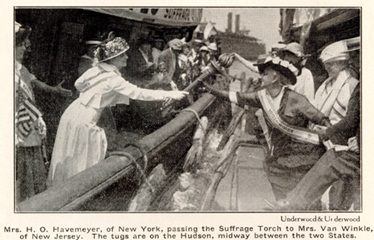
"Mrs H. O. Havemeyer, of New York, passing the Suffrage Torch to Mrs. Van Winkle, of New Jersey." August 7, 1915

The Suffrage Torch (also known as the Torch of Liberty and the Suffrage Torch of Victory) was a wooden and bronze-finished sculpture of a torch that was used in the New Jersey, New York, and Pennsylvania women's suffrage campaigns starting in the summer of 1915. The torch was the idea of Harriot Stanton Blatch who wanted a visual publicity stunt to draw attention to the suffrage campaigns. The torch traveled throughout New York state and was handed over to Mina Van Winkle, head of the New Jersey suffragists. The torch was stolen in New Jersey and later recovered in Philadelphia. The suffrage torch drew a good deal of publicity during its use in the campaigns taking place in those three states.

== About ==
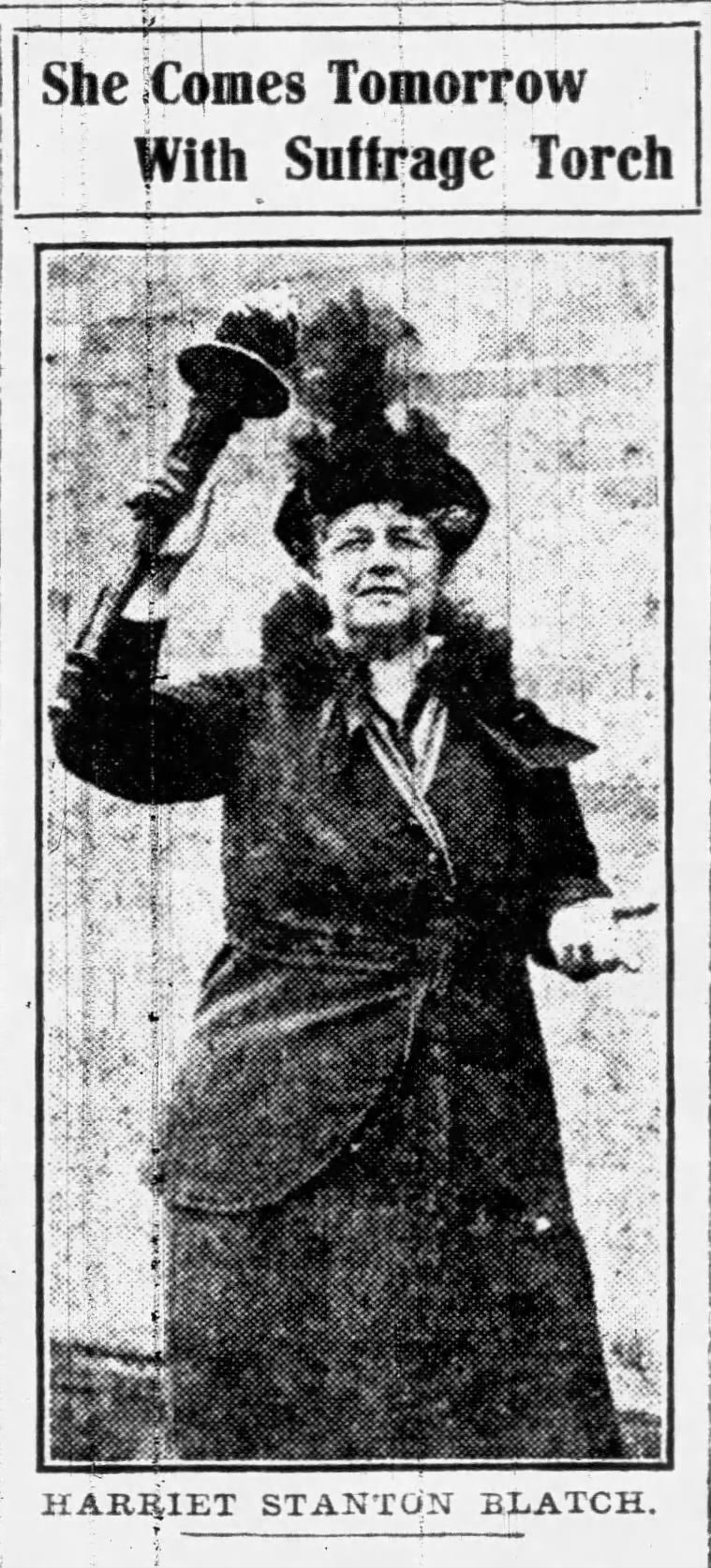
"She Comes Tomorrow With Suffrage Torch", Harriot Stanton Blatch, July 30, 1915

The Suffrage Torch, also known as the Torch of Liberty, was a small wooden sculpture with a bronze finish, made to look like a torch on fire. It was designed by Alice Stocks. It was meant to be a way to increase publicity, as a "mega-stunt" for the women's suffrage campaigns in New Jersey, New York, and Pennsylvania areas. The torch was the idea of Harriot Stanton Blatch, the daughter of suffrage and women's rights leader Elizabeth Cady Stanton, who wanted a "symbol of illumination" for women's suffrage. Blatch traveled with Louisine Havemeyer around New York, starting in Long Island in June and early July 1915, bringing the torch with them to campaign stops. Margaret Ashley Bellinger also participated in the event. Havemeyer used the torch as a prop during several speeches she gave in New York. The last stop for the New York tour was Buffalo in late July.

The torch was handed off to the New Jersey Women's Political Union (WPU) on August 7, 1915. New York members of the WPU went halfway across the Hudson River on the tugboat, Holbrook, while New Jersey WPU activists left on the A.W. Smith. Originally Blatch was to take the torch on the boat, but Havemeyer stood in her place, despite becoming seasick during the journey. The boats were decorated in purple, green and white. Both boats were late to their meeting. The New York boat was late due to a delay with publicity on the pier. The New Jersey boat was late because the suffragists had forgotten to obtain a license to ship out. This information was relayed by a man in a dinghy, called the De Gink and piloted by "Fatty" Willy. Willy took suffrage supporter, W. S. Holbrook to the Jersey shore where they were able to get the A.W. Smith out on the water.

The boats met in the middle of the Hudson River and "drew rail to rail". First the suffragists read a "A Hymn for Equal Suffrage" by Percy MacKaye and then Havemeyer gave a speech. Havemeyer passed the torch to Mina Van Winkle of New Jersey, completing the passing of the torch ceremony.

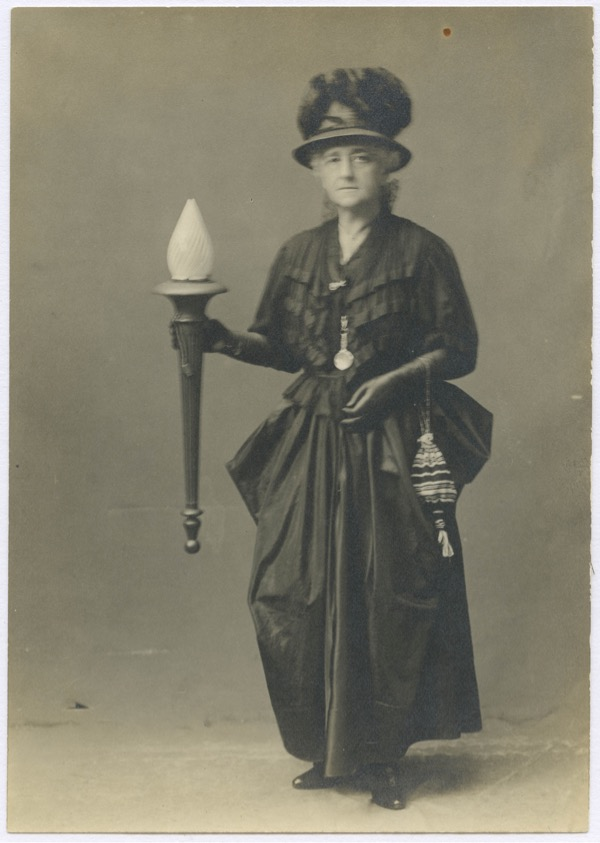
Louisine Havemeyer with the Liberty Torch in 1919.

The torch accompanied activists and their speeches at several New Jersey cities. At a meeting at the Atlantic Highlands on August 18, 1915, the torch was stolen from a car when it was under the care of Alyse Gregory. Van Winkle offered a $50 reward for the return of the torch. Blatch was critical of the New Jersey activists saying, "Mrs. H. O. Havemeyer and I, who guarded the torch in New York never let it out of our sight. We even took it to bed with us. I'm sorry the New Jersey suffragists were so recreant to their trust." Immediately, anti-suffragists were blamed for being the thieves. In order to counter the attack, anti-suffragists pledged $30 to increase the reward to $80 for the return of the torch. The Suffrage Torch was found about a week later by a lawyer and suffragist, Anthony V. Lynch, Jr., who found it in a streetcar in Philadelphia. Lynch refused the reward and gave the money back to the New Jersey suffragists.

The torch continued to tour throughout New Jersey after it was returned. In early September, the torch was passed into Pennsylvania and given to Mrs. Werkheiser of Easton, Pennsylvania. The New York Sun noted that the Suffrage Torch drew a good deal of attention during the 1915 campaign.

== See also ==
- Women's suffrage in Pennsylvania
- Women's suffrage in the United States
