= Harriet White Fisher =

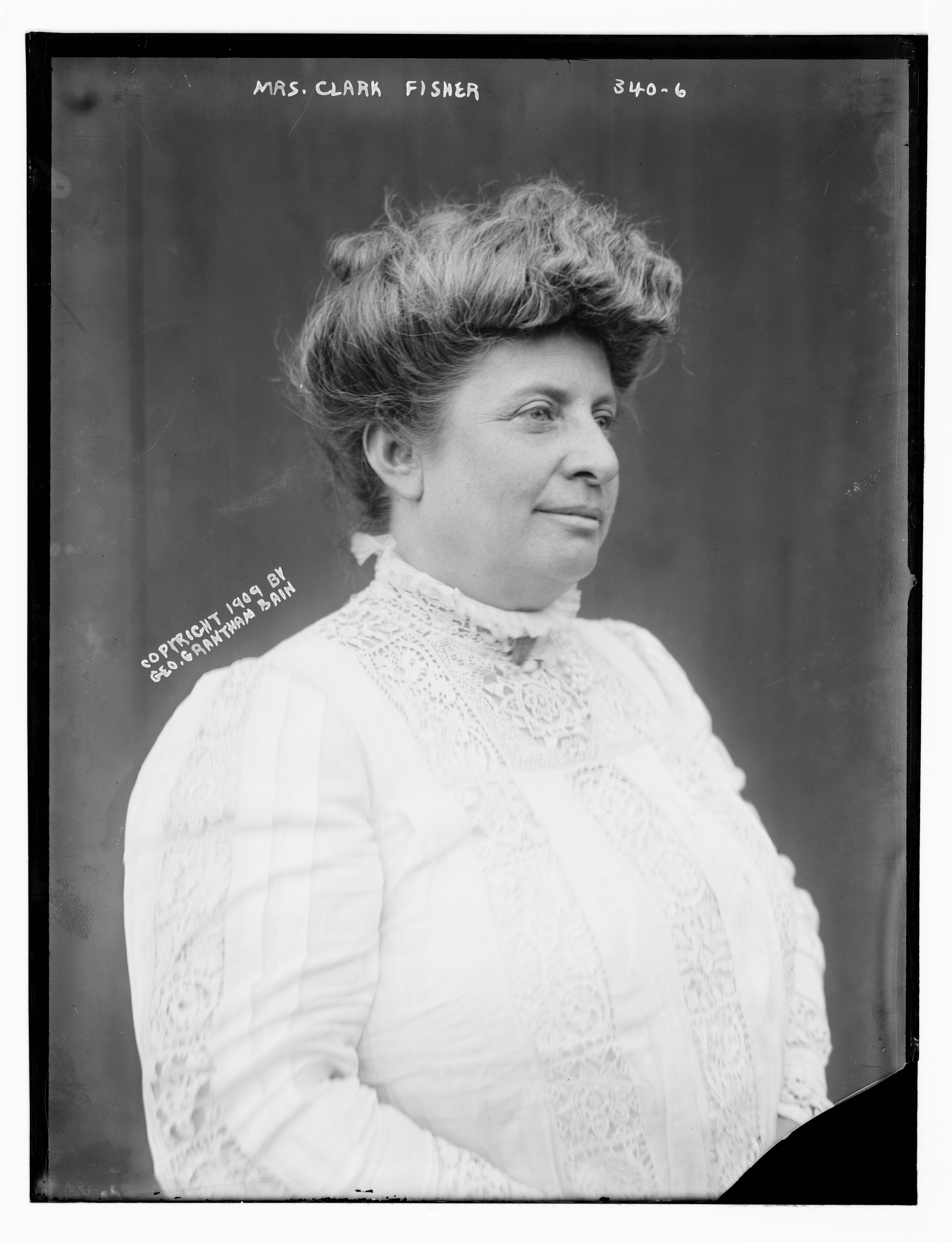
- Born: March 31, 1861; Crawford County, Pennsylvania, US
- Died: June 25, 1939 (aged 78)
- Achievements: First woman to circle globe in a Locomobile

Harriet White Fisher Andrew (1861–1939) was an American known for being the first woman to circle the globe in a Locomobile.

== Birth and early life ==
Harriet White was born in Crawford County, Pennsylvania on March 31, 1861. She was the daughter of Oscar A. White and Hannah Fisher, and was educated at The Young Women's Classical Seminary in Cleveland Ohio. At the time of the Johnstown Flood she took care of victims. Wu Tingfang, Chinese diplomat and politician, called Mrs. Harriet White Fisher "The most wonderful woman in America."

== Train accident ==
On October 8, 1902, two Pennsylvania Railroad passenger trains collided in Menlo Park, New Jersey. Harriet Fisher was severely injured. A report of her injuries stated she was in Presbyterian Hospital (New York City) for eight weeks, hospitalized with fractured hips, spinal injury, and internal injury.

== Steel industry ==
After her husband's death, Harriet Fisher took over the management of Eagle Steel Works (later named Fisher & Norris Anvil Works) in Trenton, New Jersey. She was the only woman member of the National Association of Manufacturers. She is quoted in The Washington Post in 1911, describing her involvement in the business:

"Though I liked machinery even when a child," said Mrs. Fisher, "it was my husband's illness and the desire which every woman has to help in an emergency that led me to enter the Eagle Works, of which Mr. Fisher was the head. I went in as the 'boss'; but I soon learned that if I was to be respected by my employees, I would have to know more than they did. To this end, I began as a regular apprentice, learned to temper steel, chisel the face of an anvil, mold vises and make rails. In fact, I took a complete course in every department of the business, from melting pig-iron to bidding for contracts. Before I was through, I learned really to love the work with iron and steel, the whir of the machinery, and the sound of the forge."

Her wealth was reported at $2,000,000 in 1906. "She underbid her rivals on part of the Panama Canal equipment and has made $1,000,000 on that feature of her plan's output."

== First woman to drive around the world ==
Initial reports prior to her journey revealed that her four-seat car was built in Bridgeport, Connecticut, and had a 40-horsepower engine with no special equipment. Her planned companions were Harold Fisher Brooks (a relative), a chef named Albert, and a maid. She also traveled with a pet monkey, a Bull Terrier, and a Pug. The planned route was to ship the car to England, travel to her Italian villa at Lake Como, and then continue through Egypt, India, Japan, and back to the United States A bon voyage party was announced in July 1909 at the Automobile Club of America. The travelers set off on July 19, 1909. It was reported that she arrived at Lake Como by November 1909. A contemporary newspaper account stated that Fisher and her entourage had completed their journey to Japan and that the travelers and the vehicle were back in San Francisco, California. She arrived in Tarrytown, New York on August 16, 1910, completing her journey around the world. Fisher wrote a book about her adventure titled A Woman's World Tour in A Motor.

== Personal life ==
Her first known marriage was to Clark Fisher. They were married in London, England on July 20, 1898. The report of their marriage in the Trenton Evening Times states the bride's name as Mrs. White, a widow who moved to Flushing, Queens in 1896. However, a later interview of Harriet Fisher, stated she was a "White" by birth and her mother was distantly related to her husband. Fisher died in 1903. She married again on April 27, 1912, to Silvano Alfredo Andrew, an officer in the Argentine Navy, in Manhattan. It was described as a quiet ceremony in the press because the groom's brother, Edgar Samuel Andrew had died on the Titanic a few days earlier.

Fisher was an anti-suffragist and testified against women's suffrage in New Jersey in 1913.

== Bibliography ==
- A Woman's World Tour in a Motor, by Harriet White Fisher, Lippincott 1911
- Around the World in 1909:Harriet White Fisher and Her Locomobile, by Lisa Begin-Kruysman (American History Press - 2014), ISBN 978-1939995070
