= Sophia Monté Neuberger Loebinger =

Jewish-American singer, philanthropist, women's rights activist and writer

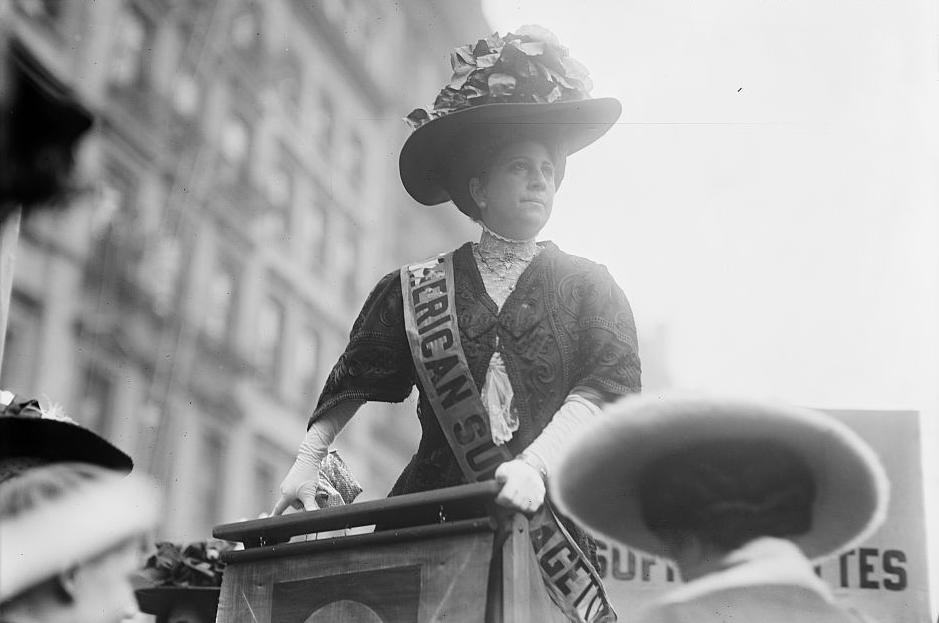
- Sophia Loebinger speaking before City Hall.
- Born: Sophia Neuberger; July 28, 1865; Chicago, Illinois
- Died: March 7, 1943 (aged 77)
- Education: The Normal College
- Occupations: Activist, editor, singer, school teacher
- Years active: 1880s–1940s
- Known for: Suffrage activism, opera singing, charitable work
- Notable work: The American Suffragette (Editor)
- Title: Baroness
- Movement: Women's Suffrage Movement
- Spouse: Hugo Julius Loebinger
- Children: Julia Inez Loebinger
- Parent(s): Jacob and Rosalie Neuberger

Sophia Monté Neuberger Loebinger (1865–1943) was a Jewish-American singer, philanthropist, women's suffrage activist, orator, writer, and newspaper editor. While often remembered as a suffragist, her brand of pro-suffrage activism adopted both the namesake and political outlook of the British-derived suffragette movement. Like her British predecessors, Loebinger's activism employed more radical and militant tactics than the adjacent American suffragists. Such radicalism made waves in the media both locally and nationally, and helped galvanize a public politics of protest for the American suffrage movement. She was a founding member of the Progressive Woman Suffrage Union and served as both editor and a regular contributor to its newspaper, The American Suffragette.

== Biography ==
=== Early life ===
Sophia was born in Chicago, Illinois on July 28, 1865, to Jewish immigrant parents, Jacob and Rosalie (Roldene) Neuberger. Born in Germany, her father arrived in the Port of New York on December 23, 1851 before making his way to Chicago where he met Danish-born Rosalie Stein. The two were married in Cook County, Illinois in 1858. While the Neubergers were not a wealthy family, a New York Tribune article from 1920 notes that Jacob Neuberger had associations with Albert Paine, who served as the mayor of New York during the civil war and was a close friend and client of Abraham Lincoln.

After Sophia's birth in 1865, Rosalie had six more children between the 1860s and 1870s, respectively named Isaac, David, Silas, Louis, Minnette (Minnie), and Freedrieka. Sophia and David remained very close throughout her life.

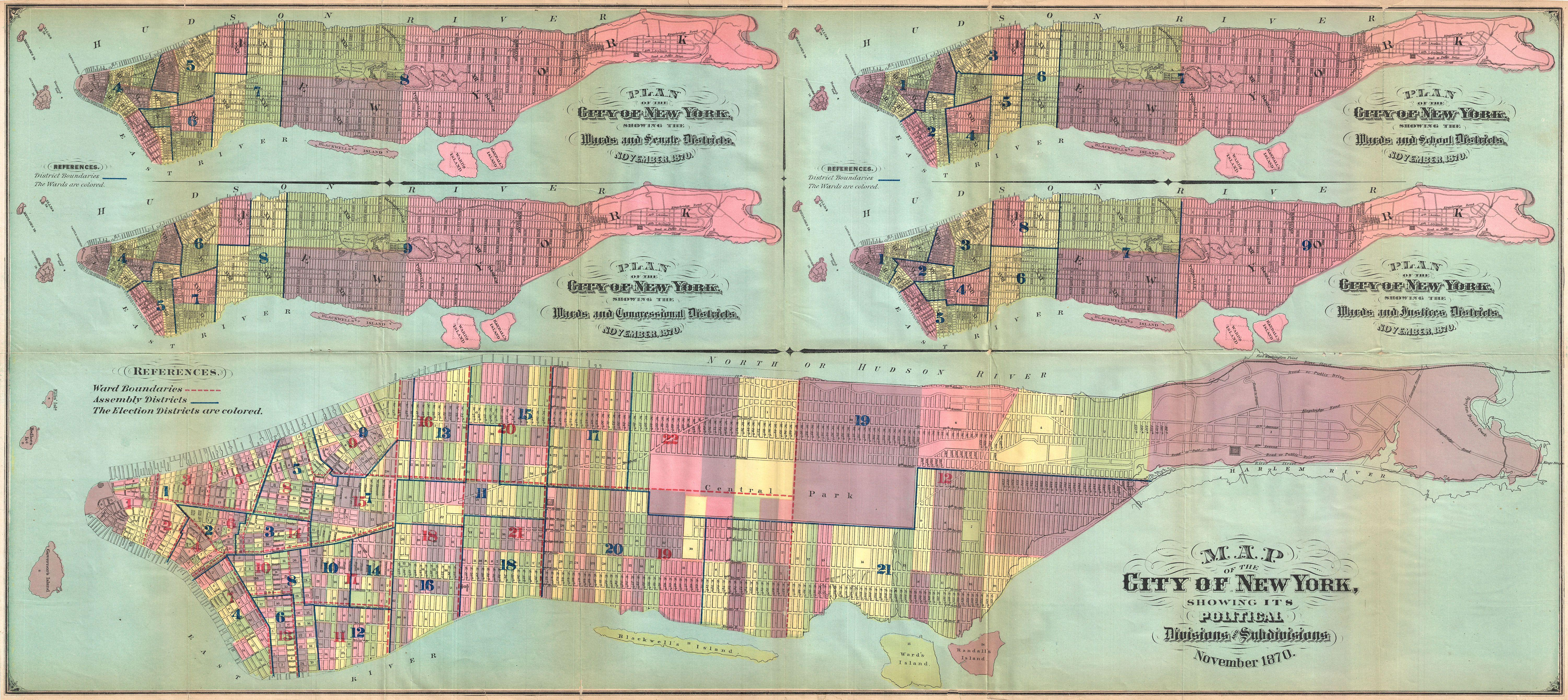
Map of New York showing Wards and Election Districts, 1870.

As the eldest of her siblings, Sophia spent her earliest years in Chicago before moving with her family to New York City in the late 1860s. Upon their arrival, Sophia’s family lived in what was then Manhattan's Nineteenth Ward, between the areas known today as Lenox Hill and Midtown East, before relocating to East 122nd Street in the late 1870s, in what is now East Harlem. At the time of their residence, elevated trains ("els") were just being extended to the area, making it a sight of rapid development. As a result, by the mid-1880s, the streets of Sophia's neighbourhood would have been lined with tightly-packed tenement buildings, built to house large populations of low-income German, Irish, and Jewish immigrants.

=== Education ===
In the early 1870s, Sophia attended New York City's Grammar school No. 53, located at Seventy-Ninth Street and Third Avenue, just south of the newly-constructed Central Park. Though there is no record of what conditions were like during Sophia's time as a student, New York Times articles from the 1880s reveal that the school suffered immensely from poor funding and unsanitary conditions. It was not uncommon for classrooms to hold fifty pupils at once, oftentimes having just one window to let in fresh air. Overheating was such a problem that, in an 1883 article, it is reported that one of the teachers fainted in front of her students, causing an hour-long frenzy. Given that Sophia became an advocate for improved education funding and conditions for both students and teachers, it is likely that she endured similarly unfavourable classroom settings during her time as a student.

Despite these conditions, Sophia graduated with first-class honours in 1874, achieving an 85 percent average and being awarded a silver medal in German. It was also during this time that she began honing the performance skills for which she would receive great acclaim in the following decade. Already a recognized singing talent, she, along with classmate Rachel Frohman, was chosen to represent her school by performing a duet of Vincenzo Gabussi's "The Fisherman" at their graduation ceremony.

After finishing grade school, Sophia went on to attend New York's The Normal College where she received the modern equivalent of a high school education, as well as training that enabled her to become a school teacher. Following her education, she briefly taught in the boys' department of Grammar School No. 70 on East 122nd Street.

=== Singing career ===
Prior to her career as a philanthropist and activist, Sophia (still Neuberger at the time) received high praise as an operatic soprano. Before making her professional stage debut, it was Sophia's intention to move abroad for her musical study and training. In support of this desire, a charitable concert was held at Steinway Hall in April 1881, the proceeds of which were to go towards financing Sophia's international education. Singing to an audience of her friends, Sophia received resounding applause with one newspaper outlet writing that "concerts of this kind require no critical comment." Despite the success of this event, an October spotlight printed in The Musical Courier revealed that Sophia would remain in New York for her formal stage training, placing herself under the direction of retired opera singer, Adelina Murio-Celli d'Elpeux.

After completing her training, Sophia made a name for herself in the entertainment world, being chosen to accompany the renowned violinist Camilla Urso on an extended concert tour in 1883. Their tour was heavily advertised in newspapers at the time, and stopped in a variety of cities including Philadelphia and Freeport, Illinois. She made her official New York stage debut on December 11, 1884, in a revival performance of "Der Bettlestudent" at the Thalia Theatre. Though critics report that both Sophia's singing and acting that night suffered from a palpable nervousness, the performance was received favourably overall.

Sophia continued to perform throughout the mid-1880s, singing at a number of prestigious theatres including the Lexington Avenue Opera House before gaining high acclaim in the European operatic circuit where she performed under the stage name Mlle. Monté. Her talent was so highly regarded that, on September 24, 1886, she was chosen to be the lead soprano in an operatic performance put on by the city of Metz in honour of the Crown Prince Frederick William’s visit. According to critics, the performance_{,} in particular Sophia's singing, was met with great applause.

Sophia retired from the professional stage in the late 1880s, returning to New York where she became popular among certain elite social circles after her marriage to Hugo Loebinger in 1889. Despite her professional retirement, her talents were so favoured among these circles that her friends started a musical and literary club in her honour, the entertainments of which frequently featured Sophia's singing. Although this club flourished for some time, it disbanded after many of its core members left the city. Despite the club's disbandment, a small number of remaining members felt disinclined to give up the pleasures of these gatherings altogether, requesting that Sophia keep up the regular meetings. While she was apprehensive about this request, she eventually acceded, under the condition that the small number of remaining club members join her in creating a new organization that was both social and charitable. This condition led to the founding of the Monté Relief Society in 1893.

=== Marriage and children ===
Upon her return to New Tork, Sophia met Bavarian-born Baron Hugo Julius Loebinger, a reputedly well-to-do physician who had received honors in Berlin, Paris, and several American cities. The two were married in Manhattan on November 27, 1889, making Sophia a baroness. Once married, the Loebingers moved to a more affluent Jewish neighbourhood in Manhattan, where they lived at 32 Edgecombe Avenue in one of New York's trademark brownstones located on the border of St. Nicholas Park. They welcomed their first and only child, Julia (Jewel) Inez Loebinger, into the world on October 20, 1891. Like her mother, Jewel had a talent for music, becoming a noted cellist and student of Max Gegna following her education at Washington Irving High School. Tragically, Jewel died of bronchial pneumonia in 1920, leaving behind her husband of merely three years, Nicholas Rippen, and their fifteen-month-old daughter, Jacquelin.

== The Monté Relief Society ==
In January 1893, Sophia (now a married woman and mother) turned her musical prowess into a vehicle for giving back when she, along with sixteen fellow Jewish women, co-founded the Monté Relief Society: a charitable organization dedicated to feeding and clothing New York's sick and poor. With Loebinger serving as president, the Monté Relief Society began its work with fierce precision and organization, dedicating the first three months of its existence to bolstering its reputation among New York's charitable circuit, raising funds, and planning out the precise modes of aiding and alleviating distress that the society would employ once it became operational.

Composed of women between the ages of 18 and 45, the Monté Relief Society's principal aim was to "promote benevolence and charity, by relieving the sick and the distressed to the best of their ability and the extent of their funds." Their relief efforts focused primarily around distributing food and clothing to those in need, as well as providing monetary aid and, on occasion, helping those fit for employment find and secure work opportunities. Although no preference was given to particular districts or creeds, the charity's weekly ministrations were frequented by the sweatshop workers living in the overcrowded tenement walk-ups of the Lower East Side. Like the well-organized groundwork that went into the society upon its inception, each case was assessed and investigated on an individual basis to ensure none but deserving families received aid. As a result of this organized leadership, much of which depended on Loebinger, membership in the society grew so rapidly that it had to relocate to a larger meeting space within its first year. In just two years, the society went from 17 to 500 members, all dedicated to helping hundreds of families in need.

== Suffrage activism ==
=== The Progressive Woman Suffrage Union ===
In 1907, Loebinger became a founding member and treasurer of the Progressive Woman Suffrage Union, known otherwise as the American Suffragettes. While historians typically credit Harriot Stanton Blatch and the Equality League of Self-Supporting Women with being the first militant suffrage organization in the United States of America, it was Loebinger and her comrades who, taking inspiration from the British suffragettes of the Women's Social and Political Union (WSPU), first took on the suffragette title and began militantly campaigning for "Votes for Women." After opening their first permanent headquarters at 122 East 123rd Street in New York City in March 1908, the PWSU, hoping to make equal suffrage a burning political topic from coast to coast, expanded to be a national organization, opening new branches in Brooklyn, Harlem, East Orange County, New Jersey, and Stamford, Connecticut. By August 1908, their expanded enterprise became known to the public under the broader moniker of the National Progressive Woman Suffrage Union. In April 1909, Loebinger was appointed chairman of the PWSU's Harlem branch, even writing a theme song for the union called "The Suffragette." In July 1910, the Union again changed their name to The United Suffragettes of America (U.S.A.), taking up the motto, "In Union There Is Strength."

==== The PWSU Constitution ====
Objects:

To ensure the complete political enfranchisement of women and an equality of right and opportunities between the sexes.

Methods:

This Union shall seek to obtain its objects by:

1. Action entirely independent of all political parties.
2. Vigorous, forceful, aggressive agitation on lines justified by the position of outlawry to which women are at present condemned.
3. The organizing of women all over the country to enable them to give adequate expression to their desire for political freedom.
4. Education of public opinion by all methods which appear to be advisable, such as public meetings, debates, distribution of literature, newspaper correspondence and deputations to public representatives.

Members:

Women and men of all shades of political opinions, and in particular all women, whether of the home, the shop, or the office, are eligible to membership.

A foundational component of the PWSU's activism was its ability to combine public action and oration with intellectual writing. This potent political cocktail was made possible by the simultaneous incorporation of their own periodical, The American Suffragette, for which Loebinger served as managing editor.

==== The American Suffragette ====
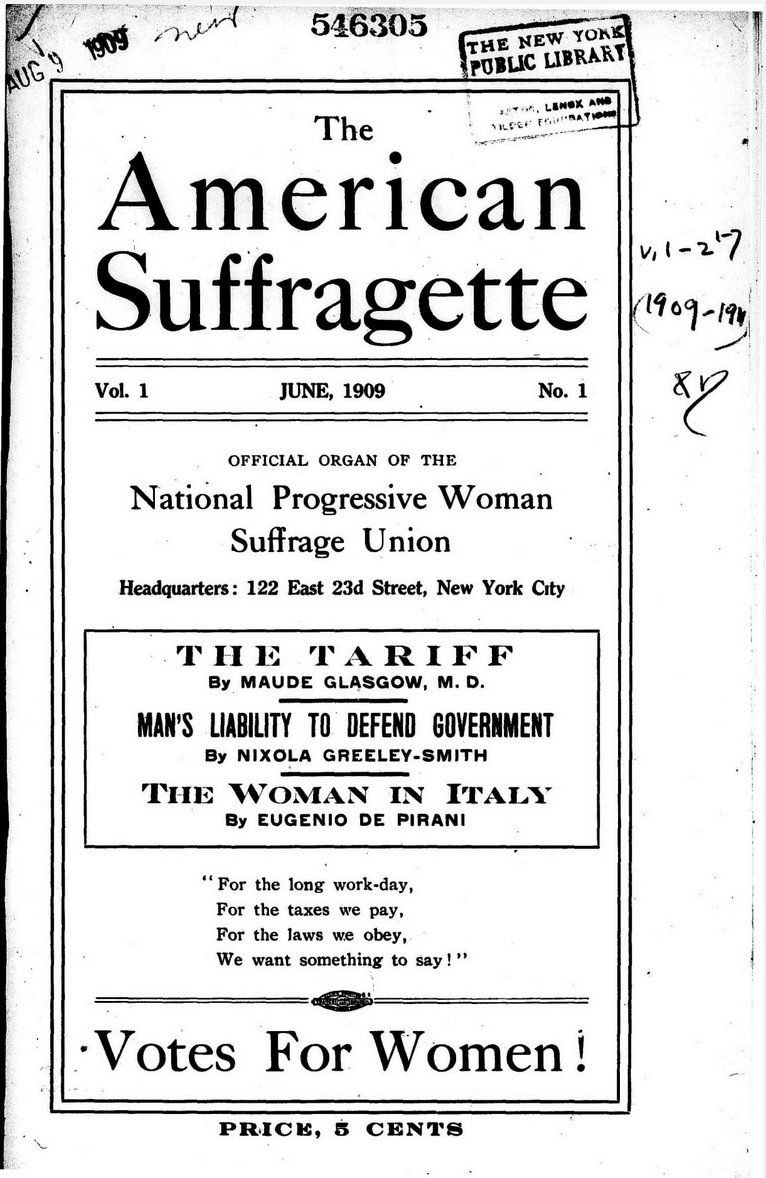

In 1909, Loebinger, along with fellow PWSU members Helen Murphy and Merle Ryan, became a director of the newly-incorporated Suffrage Publishing Company of New York. This gave the PWSU the opportunity to create a newsprint mouthpiece for the Union, aptly titled The American Suffragette. While the main purpose of this periodical was to give the suffragettes a space to make their political ideas known and heard, it also provided a source of revenue for the Union. With its members taking on the role of newsies, they took to the streets to sell their paper, accompanied by a cacophony of tambourines, hurdy-gurdies, and exclamations of "Buy The American Suffragette." The spectacular nature of these tactics drew such large crowds that police intervention was not an uncommon occurrence. On one such occasion, while selling their paper on the Brooklyn Bridge, Loebinger and her suffragette companions were asked by the police to move away from the bridge when their boisterous activities began impeding the flow of traffic. After an attempt to relocate to City Hall Park, the suffragettes were met with further police intervention, after which all but Loebinger scattered. Staying behind to argue with Policeman Donnelly, Loebinger initially stood her ground, asserting that she wanted to continue selling her papers. It was only once Donnelly insisted that her actions were illegal that she reluctantly backed down.

During the periodical's two-year run, Loebinger served as managing editor, secretary, and treasurer, and was a regular content contributor. As editor, it was her goal to "make [the newspaper] hum with the firm determination [needed] to help win the fight for [women's] political freedom in the near future." A pivotal facet of this goal was the chance Loebinger saw to provide women with a periodical that "[was] neither a cook book, nor a fashion sheet, nor a collection of recipes on how to amount to nothing." Rather, Loebinger saw the task of the American Suffragette as showcasing "an expression of woman's natural ability to be something more than a kitchen utensil," empowering women to think for themselves and dream of a world in which they could occupy space outside of the private domestic sphere. Unsurprisingly, the radical nature of Loebinger's political thought was met with heavy criticism from the anti-suffrage men and women whose ideas were being directly challenged by the American Suffragette. Viewed in combination with the unapologetic noisiness of her public, pro-suffrage campaign, Loebinger's critics began equating the "unwomanliness" of her thoughts and actions with a lack of respect for both her husband and for womanhood in general. One such critic went so far as to tell Loebinger and her comrades to "Go home and cook [their] husbands dinner!" In response to such critique, Loebinger asserted that she had lost neither her womanliness nor her love for her husband through her actions. Instead of backing down, Loebinger held strong in her conviction that being an enfranchised, intellectually-engaged woman was in no way mutually exclusive from being a loving wife. As if to prove as much, Loebinger continued to dress "womanly" during many of her public demonstrations, wearing furs, roses, glove-fitting black dresses, and a big hat.

Operating as the "official organ of The National Progressive Woman Suffrage Union," the American Suffragette served as a second physical body through which Loebinger presented a carefully curated image of womanhood that combined politics and intellect with more traditionally "feminine" interests, all of which were captured in the periodical's diverse genres including essays, poetry, polemics, and domestic-oriented advertisements.^{[} This editorial strategy served as a powerful and pointed contestation of the popular idea that the suffragettes were unladylike and aggressive, with Loebinger's own contributions upholding the more orthodox notion that men and women did bear palpable differences. While the open-air tactics used by the PWSU were a daring rejection of gendered social spheres, Loebinger's essays reveal that, for her, the question of enfranchisement was never a question– or rejection– of femininity and feminism but one of basic constitutional right.

Beyond just being the mouthpiece for members of the PWSU, the American Suffragette was openly dedicated "to Women's progress in general." As a means to present a more general and expansive view of women's progress outside of their Union, the periodical included interspersed sections oriented towards the national and the global, giving the American Suffragettes' newspaper a much broader political scope. Notable among these sections were "Notes from Foreign Shores," which reported the progress of women internationally; a "Public Aula" that invited readers to send in their opinions, whether for or against the cause of women's suffrage; the "Progress of Women," which served as a response to the lack of women's magazines invested in women's intellectual, economic, and political life by reporting women's progress in just such areas; and, beginning in Volume 2, a serialized printing of Mary Wollstonecraft's seminal essay, "A Vindication of the Rights of Women."

===== Issues =====
====== 1909 ======
- June – Volume 1, Issue 1
- July – Volume 1, Issue 2
- August – Volume 1, Issue 3
- September–October – Volume 1, Issue 4
- November – Volume 1, Issue 5
- December – Volume 1, Issue 6

====== 1910 ======
- January – Volume 1, Issue 7
- February – Volume 1, Issue 8
- March – Volume 1, Issue 9
- May – Volume 1, Issue 10
- July – Volume 1, Issue 11
- August – Volume 1, Issue 12
- September – Volume 2, Issue 1
- October – Volume 2, Issue 2
- November – Volume 2, Issue 3
- December – Volume 2, Issue 4

====== 1911 ======
- January – Volume 2, Issue 5
- February – Volume 2, Issue 6
- April – Volume 2, Issue 7

===== Essays and major contributions =====
- "My Debut"
- "Suffragist and Suffragette"
- "In Rank and File"
- "Man-Made Laws: Prompted by Egotistical, Non-altruistic, Unscientific Instincts"
- "Political Organizations of Women: The Purpose and Significance"
- "Our Cook Day"
- "The Unfurling of Our Banner"
- "An Unusual Shop"
- "Suffragism, Not Feminism"
- "Noted Woman Scientist and American Suffragette"
- "The Social Question in the Suffragette Movement"
- "Echoes from the Great Yuletide Festival of the Woman's Freedom League"
- "A Successful Experiment"
- "Man-Made Reforms"
- "Women Pioneers and Leaders"
- "Woman As Composer of Operas"
- "International Peace A Utopia Until Women Are Seated In Parliaments"
- "Freak Legislation"
- "Suffragettes Plead for Matrons"
- "What Is In A Name?"
- "Special Honors to One of Our Honorary Members. Miss Jane Addams"
- "Suffragettes in the Coming Campaign"
- "Blazing the Trail"
- "The West! The West!"
- "Our Need"
- "Insurgency"
- "Why Mr. Barry is an Anti"
- "Who Is a Suffragette?"

=== Suffrage militancy and open-air meetings ===
Loebinger's brand of militant activism came about largely as a response to what she identified as an ineffective conservatism within the extant American suffrage movement. Calling their efforts "but a tea party," Loebinger thought that the parlour-confined suffragists relied too much on cajoling, pleading, and persuading men to give them the vote instead of taking direct action and demanding enfranchisement. Believing that the only way to truly prove that pro-suffrage women meant business was to use "militant methods," Loebinger set out to turn the fight for suffrage into the battle it needed to be. While the suffragists of old "just wanted" the vote, Loebinger and her fellow suffragettes were determined to get it. Still, while this call for militancy took inspiration from British suffragettes like Emmeline Pankhurst, Loebinger's war was to be a peaceful one, guaranteed to be without bloodshed. Rather than turning to violent civil disobedience, she and her PWSU comrades cultivated what suffrage scholar Mary Chapman has called a powerful and effective politics of public "noisiness" that directly challenged the suffragists' aim of working "quietly and in a dignified manner" to further their cause. Whether she was riding to City Hall in a procession of yellow-laden taxicabs, staging innovative public spectacles, covering amusement parks in vibrant yellow banners, or slinging newspapers to the masses to the tune of disharmony, Loebinger's militancy and political dedication took her on a campaign through the streets of New York City, collecting crowds, coins, and converts along the way.

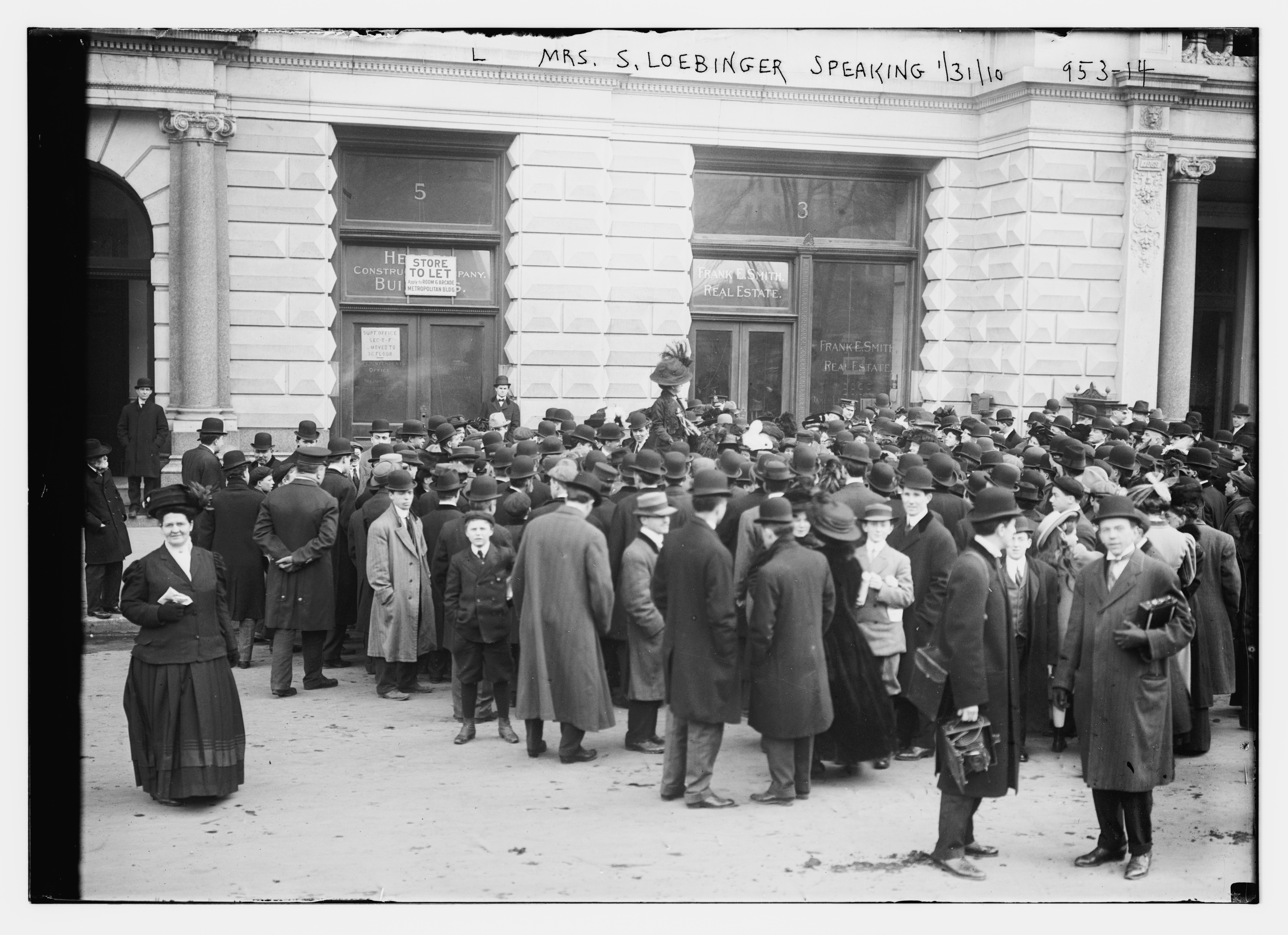
Sophia Loebinger Speaking to a Crowd on the Street, New York

One of Loebinger's most impactful contributions to the suffrage movement was her ability to captivate huge crowds through her powerful oration. Determined that she and her pro-suffrage sisters were "going to make themselves heard through word and action," Loebinger took the "Votes for Women" campaign to the streets in the form of open-air meetings that used public speech as another method of "unwomanly" noisiness. In March 1908, on the southeast corner of Madison Square, Loebinger began her career as an orator by ascending a ladder platform wrapped in the PWSU emblematic yellow banner, an item that would become synonymous with Loebinger in the years to come. Delivering speeches in both English and German, Loebinger became known, even by those who were not interested in the suffrage cause, for her "quickness at repartee, her unfailing good humour, her Paquin frocks and her fearlessness in expressing her opinion on any subject or any person." With "fiery" enthusiasm and sharp intellect, Loebinger would spend her years as a PWSU activist delivering rousing public speeches to enormous crowds of intrigued men, women, and children. These open-air meetings were such a powerful tool for Loebinger and the PWSU that she and her band of "noisy" women became known to the public as the "fresh air suffragettes."

==== Need for police protection ====
While accounts given in the American Suffragette depict these meetings as generally orderly, Loebinger was not afraid to admit that being militant was not always pleasant. A New York Times article following the first open-air meeting of the PWSU's Brooklyn branch shows Loebinger reflecting on how the suffragettes' first-ever open-air appearance nearly got them killed. While Loebinger would fast grow comfortable in her role as a public female orator, safety concerns loomed as a recurrent problem for her and her fellow suffragettes who, after opening the Harlem branch, went so far as to call upon a police inspector in protest of the lack of protection given to them by the police during their open-air meetings. Though police protection did improve over time Loebinger and her fellow suffragettes were never fully out of danger. Threats of arrest and imprisonment were a frequent companion to their public demonstrations, and their efforts were regularly interrupted– and often thwarted– by jeers, hisses, and laughter from crowds of anti-suffrage boys and men. One such incident in July 1909 nearly caused a riot in City Hall Park when, while selling papers, Loebinger and her comrades founds themselves at the centre of such a crush that they had to shriek for police intervention. The publicity surrounding their Union also led to frequent burglaries of their headquarters, with one such incident leaving the Union at a loss of over $600– in today's market, the equivalent of nearly $18,000.

=== Suffrage actions ===
While much of Loebinger's suffrage work happened during the PWSU's open-air meetings, held weekly outside of the union's branch headquarters, she also participated in a number of key public demonstrations that helped expedite the fight for women's enfranchisement.

==== 1909 ====
In January 1909, the PWSU founded its Brooklyn branch, holding their first open-air meeting at 915 President Street. Located just around the corner from the Montauk Club, this new branch brought the fight for women's suffrage directly to the borough's conservative Park Slope neighbourhood. While this blanket of conservatism presented obvious challenges for the kind of radical militancy for which the PWSU stood, it did not dissuade them from making their objectives heard. During this first open-air meeting, Loebinger delivered a powerful speech in which she called attention to the "horrible mess" that unguided men had made of things, with news reports from the event say that "there wasn't much left of mere man" once she had finished.

On May 5, 1909, the PWSU's Harlem branch, chaired by Loebinger, held an open-air meeting on the corner of 116th Street and Lenox Avenue that drew a crowd of several hundred people eager to see what these "self-supporting young women" had to say. Adorned with a signature yellow "Votes for Women" button, Loebinger mounted her portable soap box to deliver an earnest oration of the objects of the suffrage movement. While her speech was received with much warmth, her PWSU comrade, Martha Klatchman, was met with an insulting question from 13-year-old Edward Goldberg. Taking it upon herself to stand up for Klatchman and send a strong message about the suffragettes' tenacity, Loebinger had the boy arrested and charged with disorderly conduct.

On August 14, 1909, Loebinger– accompanied by other New York suffragettes as well as a number of suffragists from New Jersey– took to Palisades Amusement Park to campaign for the vote, obtaining thousands of signatures on a petition that was to be presented to Congress. While the activists had bedecked the park's many walks and paths with yellow banners and streamers, giving everything a yellow golden glow, it was Loebinger's speech that day that caused a "mild sensation." Taking to her platform alongside three Iroquois women, Loebinger staged a powerful speech that, through the inclusion of Indigenous bodies, made a case for the strength and power that Indigenous communities possessed when they operated under matrilineal rule. While such a spectacle raises important ethical questions about Loebinger's militant tactics, her inclusion of Indigenous women in the conversation for women's rights, though problematic in approach, displays the impressive scope of Loebinger's political vision.

On November 14, 1909, Loebinger and her PWSU comrades strapped on yellow sashes and canvas bags full to the brim with the latest issue of The American Suffragette, taking to the streets to make their debut as newsies. Taking turns shaking their tambourines, grinding the hurdy-gurdy, and shouting "Buy the American Suffragette" to passersby, their spectacle drew crowds of hundreds. While many of the women involved made complaints about the brutal treatment they received from police this day, their activities generated so much interest that they sold all copies of their periodical in mere hours.

On December 14, 1909, Loebinger and fellow Suffragette, Sadie Saunders, broke into City Hall while the Board of Aldermen was in session with the aim of infiltrating the aldermanic chamber in which the meeting was being held. While they only made it as far as the doors of the aldermanic chamber before being turned back by the Sergeant at Arms, their guerrilla disruption caused the aldermen to flee so that, within five minutes, there was not a quorum. During this raid, Loebinger and Saunders also managed to sell numerous copies of The American Suffragette, the proceeds of which went to the newsboys' Christmas dinner fund later that month.

==== 1910 ====
In the early months of 1910, senator Edgar T. Brackett proposed a new bill, entitled the Brackett Bill, which called for an election in which women could voice their support for or against their enfranchisement. With the goal being simply to ascertain where the majority of women stood on the matter, the Brackett Bill did not propose giving women the right to vote in any real political elections. Strategically, it also neglected to make the women-only "election" a holiday, greatly impeding both the number and classes of women who would be able to participate. Naturally, this bill was met with public backlash from pro-suffrage activists who deemed it a waste of time and financial resources that would ultimately lead to no political change. In October of that same year, Loebinger, along with her frequent co-conspirator, Mary Coleman, staged a political action in response to the Brackett Bill by attempting to register to vote at the Harlem bakery in which the Board of Registry was overseeing election sign-ups. Stepping out of a car driven by a chauffeur dressed all in yellow, Loebinger and Coleman worked their way through a crowd of men towards the chairman of the board of Electors, Walter Bunnell. When asked what these women wanted, Loebinger responded with: "I am a resident of this district, and I wish to register." Met with Bunnell's emphatic assertion that "the books [were] closed," Loebinger insisted that she was both a consumer and taxpayer and that, therefore, she had the same right to vote as any tax-paying man. Despite efforts on Bunnell's part to have Loebinger and Coleman removed by police force, the policeman– fearful of Coleman's threat to file an assault complaint should he lay a finger on either of them– receded to the back of the room, allowing Loebinger and Coleman to leave on their own (though still without the right to vote).

The following month, Loebinger would get her revenge on Bunnell. Having discovered that the chairman resided in Orange, New Jersey, not Harlem, Loebinger posed as a saleswoman at the very same Harlem bakery from which Bunnell had tried to have her removed the previous month. While attempting to cast his own ballot, Bunnell was met with Loebinger's spirited cry of "I challenge that vote! That man is not a resident of New York City." As a result of Loebinger's tenacity, police conducted an investigation into Bunnell, determining that he had indeed registered under a false address. He was later arrested and a new chairman was sworn in.

== Non-suffrage activism ==
=== Meat boycott ===
In 1910, Loebinger became involved in the meat boycott that was making its way across America. Born in Cleveland, the 1910 Meat Boycott began as a workingman's movement protesting the high cost of meat through pledges to abstain from consuming any meat for at least thirty days. After becoming involved in the boycott in late-January of that year, Loebinger– alongside several of her fellow PWSU members who were likewise interested in the cause– began holding open-air demonstrations in places like Union Square and Madison Square where they passed around petition pledges declaring their intent to boycott meat consumption until prices lowered. Beyond these mass spectacles, Loebinger took to canvassing from house to house, obtaining hundreds of pledges from households claiming they would abstain from meat for sixty days.

Loebinger's involvement in the boycott helped push its political agenda further when she, with the help of the PWSU, began petitioning New York's Board of Health to investigate the cold storage warehouses where meat was being stored. Having discovered that it was being stored long after it had begun to decompose, Loebinger began advocating for date stamps to be added to meat packages before being put into these storage warehouses and that all meat older than 60 days should be confiscated and condemned. Her concern with public health and welfare in relation to the sale of unfit and expired meat led to the formation of the Gotham Beef Party, named in memory of the Boston Tea Party. Fed up with the lack of effort she saw from the Board of Health, Loebinger declared on January 31 that she and her Beef Party "want[ed] no more talk about investigation, [they] want[ed] action from the Board of Health" in the form of confiscating all unfit meat and turning it over to the Beef Party for disposal. While their disposal plan did not entail throwing masses of unfit meat into New York's waters– despite what their nominal homage might suggest– the Beef Party's plan to hold a massive public bonfire was equally radical.

Aside from pledges and petitions, one of Loebinger's primary forms of protest was her declaration that the Gotham Beef Party would open public cooking schools in the streets of New York that would teach women how to cook without meat. In addition to this claim, Loebinger stated that the larger goal was to prepare and publish a series of meat-free recipes, and that she and her fellow Beef Party members were ready and willing to go directly to people's homes to show them how to cook "good food without meat." In the following months, the American Suffragette became just such a platform for publishing meat-free recipes, with its 1910 spring issues featuring pages dedicated to "Suffragette No-Meat Savories." While it was also proposed that a vegetarian cooking school be established, this grand plan never came to fruition.

=== Improvement of living costs and conditions and the redistribution of household funds ===
By the time Loebinger began her suffrage work, she was already a member in a dozen clubs and societies whose aim was to improve living conditions generally. Despite her actions during the 1910 Meat Boycott– and subsequent founding of the Gotham Beef Party movement– by 1912, Loebinger's political views had shifted towards more radical and far-reaching solutions to the rising cost of living, particularly its impacts on the poor. After 1910, when her protesting and petitioning had failed to stifle rising living costs, Loebinger came to believe that "no good can be done by the occasional meat riots, the blacklisting of certain shops and markets," for "such agitations are ridiculous and harmful" to the small business owners who end up suffering the most. Seeing these local disturbances continuously fail to get close to the root problem– that is, the general and global condition of high prices– Loebinger began advocating for a "return to the country" that would allow those suffering from high city-living costs "to take up the study of agriculture and scientific farming instead of overcrowding the professions which can no longer offer a decent livelihood to either men or women." Loebinger saw this "return to the country" as a particularly fruitful solution for women since the demands of agriculture meant there would always be purposeful work available for able-bodied individuals. Though failing to acknowledge the ableist undercurrent of this solution, Loebinger saw agriculture as a meaningful escape from becoming "one more [in] the long line of manicurists, typists [and] clerks." Most prescient of Loebinger's agricultural vision was her desire to turn empty lots within cities and suburbs into vegetable gardens and spaces of foodstuffs production, making her an antecedent champion of a kind of urban permaculture.

Tied to Loebinger's fight for better living conditions was her push for the redistribution of household funds between husbands and wives. Concerned with the financial struggles imposed upon housewives by their husbands' "hold outs," Loebinger believed that husbands should bring home their pay envelopes before opening them so that their wives may take the necessary amount to cover all household expenses first; whatever money was left over after covering these expenses was to be split between the spouses as spending money. Naturally, this political espousal was met unfavourably by a large number of married men.

As an extension of her suffrage work, Loebinger began voicing her support for the simultaneous New York shirtwaist strike of 1909. Sympathizing with these Jewish women's struggles to making a living wage under decent conditions, Loebinger promised that she and the suffragettes would help them gain what they justly demanded by continuing to fight for women's enfranchisement.

=== Education funding ===
On June 26, 1917, Loebinger attended New York's Conference of Organized Labor Relative to Educational Facilities. As President of the Parents’ Association of Public School No. 186, she delivered a rousing ten-minute speech in which she called for more funding to be given to public schools. Also serving as vice-president of the Federation of the School Neighbourhood Associations– as well as chairmen of a committee of 300 women working for civic justice– Loebinger worked tirelessly for the cause of better schools and better teaching conditions, believing that "better schools [would provide] the kind of education that will fit the children for future citizenship." She also voiced her active support of the female teachers who intended to use their voting rights to advocate for "equal pay for equal service."

=== Miscellaneous society work ===
In 1912, Loebinger founded the Junior Park Protection League, a neighbourhood group made up of children between the ages of four and eighteen. According to her account, the idea arose after the construction of new tenement buildings on Edgecombe Avenue, which she associated with increased poverty, vandalism, gang activity, and other crime in the area. Loebinger stated that many local children received little supervision because their parents worked long hours, and she sought to provide guidance for them. She described her approach as combining sympathy, equality, compassion, and instruction, with the aim of making the participants, in her words, useful citizens of their neighbourhood. Members of the League were given golden badges, though these carried no legal authority. Loebinger credited the group with cleaning public spaces in the St. Nicholas Park area, helping to prevent hold-ups, and encouraging members to look after their surroundings.

Loebinger is also credited with having been one of the hardest working members of the Women's Democratic committee, who, at the time, were working to get governor Woodrow Wilson elected as the 28th president of the United States. Her special contribution to this committee was her campaign work on the tariff issue.

In November 1917, she was elected president of the newly-formed Greater New York Civic League.

== Later years ==
Following the ratification of the 19th Amendment in 1920, Loebinger's activities ceased being a regular topic of interest for newspapers the way they had been during her fiery suffragette years. Still, her philanthropic spirit continued long after the fight for enfranchisement had met its triumphant end. With her undying love for the stage, she became a member of the Actors' Fund Fair– a charitable organization that gave relief to the destitute and ill of the theatrical profession– and continued to attend society entertainments throughout the 1920s and 1930s.

In August 1924, Loebinger's husband, then 61 and suffering from illness, was arrested and detained over suspected involvement in a $7000 robbery plot involving bond fraud. He was released into Sophia's care the next day on a $2500 bail and later acquitted of any charges. Just shy of one year later, he died on June 28, 1925, leaving Sophia a widow. She never remarried.

== Death and legacy ==
Sophia Loebinger died on March 7, 1943. Despite her humble upbringings, she lived a remarkable life that left a deep impression on those with whom she interacted. In correspondences between her brother, David M. Neuberger, and Theodore Debs, Debs eulogizes Loebinger with great veneration, reminiscing on her "fine traits of character, striking personality, tenderness of soul, broadmindedness, generousness of heart and other charming qualities – not the least of which, were her active support of righteous but unpopular causes, to which she so freely gave so large a part of her useful life – qualities that glorify and dignify the highest and noblest there is in the human race." Recounting a memory of Loebinger in which he witnessed her dodge through traffic to give assistance to a hungry stranger in need, Debs writes that "that little woman has a heart of gold, the spirit of a saint, and the courage of a Spartan." For Debs, Sophia Loebinger was a woman "richly endowed with a loving sympathy that had no bounds; whose warm heart throbbed in compassion for the downtrodden, the persecuted; and her less fortunate brothers of the race and with all the strength of her being she gave without stint her fine ability and energy to make this a nobler, a better world for the children of men in which to live in peace and comfort."

Upon her death, David M. Neuberger put together a brochure titled "The Works of Sophia Loebinger," in which he compiled some of her best writing to give to a dozen of her closest friends and family. While no copies of this brochure have been recovered, Theodore Debs, upon receiving and reading it in 1944, wrote that it was "a wonderfully fine tribute to an unusually f[i]ne, unselfish soul."

Despite such high praises from those with whom Loebinger was close, the legacy of her activism remains complicated. As noted by Pamela S. Nadell, Loebinger's rigorous efforts to separate herself from the conservative suffragists have been all but forgotten by the dominant historical narrative of American women's suffrage. By 1917, it appears that Loebinger's story had already begun receding to the outskirts of America's suffrage movement with much of it being forgotten entirely until a grandniece, Ann Goldsmith Miller, uncovered documents revealing the true history. Still, while Loebinger's contributions to both the suffrage movement and New York's political circuit are often overshadowed, overlooked, and even forgotten in face of great suffrage mythologies like Seneca Falls and grand figures like Susan B. Anthony, Elizabeth Cady Stanton, Lucretia Mott, and Harriot Stanton Blatch, the impact of her life's work speaks for itself. Loebinger's humble yet impassioned role in pioneering "the little first street meeting [of March 1908]" sparked "hundreds and thousands of street meetings, till soap box was inseparably linked with suffrage." Though historical memory has not preserved her among the famed pantheon of America's suffrage activists, her legacy lives on in fragments from newspapers, her contributions to The American Suffragette, and the testaments of those who knew her best. From David M. Neuberger and Theodore Debs, we see that Sophia Loebinger's tireless work ethic left behind "a better world" for the individuals and communities who were fortunate enough to be graced by her fiery, unladylike, spectacular spirit.

== Archival discrepancies ==
As with many lesser-known historical figures, a leading difficulty in reconstructing the life and thought of Sophia Loebinger comes from the nominal discrepancies of 19th-century archives. Throughout newspapers, travel logs, school records, and censuses, Loebinger's name shows up with a number of different spellings and variations. Loebinger's first name alone appears as Sophia, Sofia, and Sophie, in addition to variants of both her maiden name and married name such as Sophie J. Newburger, Sophia J. Neuberger, Sofia Webinger, and Mrs. H.V. Loebinger. For the purposes of consistency, this page keeps the spellings used by Sophia's parents (Sophia Neuberger) and by Loebinger herself in the American Suffragette (Sophia Monté Loebinger).

Other individuals named in this page, whose documented names bear archival discrepancies, have been noted through the use parentheses containing their alternate name(s)/spelling(s)– e.g., Julia (Jewel) Inez Loebinger.
