= Lillian Feickert =

American suffragette (1877–1945)

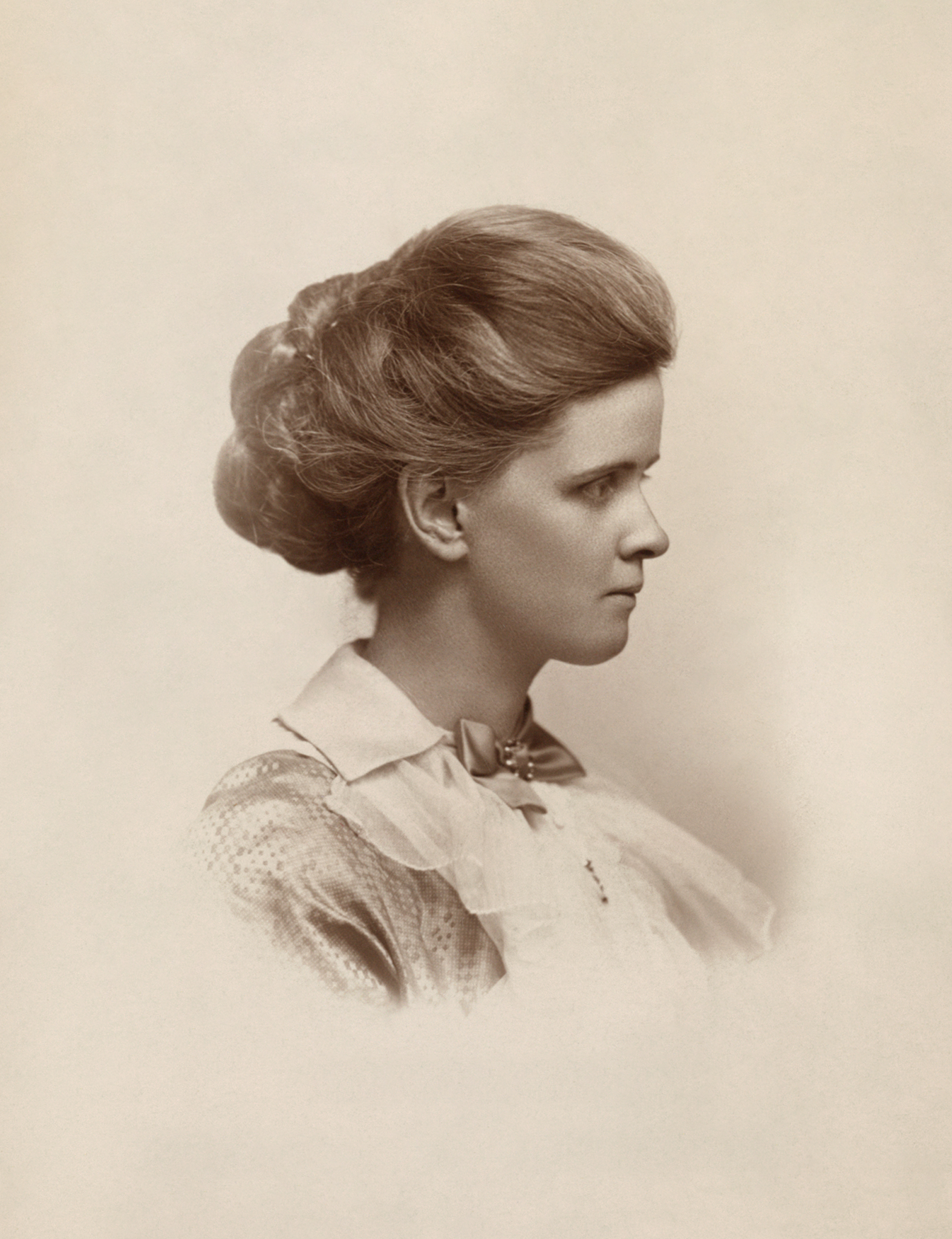
- Feickert c. 1912–1913
- Born: Lillian Ford; July 20, 1877; Brooklyn, New York City, U.S.
- Died: January 21, 1945 (aged 67); New York City, U.S.
- Resting place: Fresh Pond, New York
- Known for: First woman from New Jersey to run for United States Senate
- Spouse: Edward Foster Feickert (m. 1902; div. 1925)
- Children: 1

Lillian Ford Feickert (July 20, 1877 – January 21, 1945) was an American suffragist, New Jersey state political organizer, and the first woman from New Jersey to run for United States Senate. She served as the President of the New Jersey Woman Suffrage Association from 1912 to 1920, and later helped organize the New Jersey League of Women Voters. She went on to serve as the Vice-Chairman of the New Jersey Republican State Committee and unsuccessfully ran for the US Senate in 1928.

== Personal background ==
Lillian Ford was born on July 20, 1877, in Brooklyn, New York. She was the daughter of Herbert L. and Emeline Margaretta (née Kirkland) Ford. Her father was a lawyer and her mother was a homemaker. She had three siblings, two brothers and one sister.

On December 6, 1902, Ford married Edward Foster Feickert. They had one child, who died in infancy. Following their wedding, they moved to Plainfield, New Jersey, when Edward became an assistant secretary at the Plainfield Trust Company. In 1908, the Feickerts moved North Plainfield Township, near the foothills of Watchung Mountains. Between 1902 and 1910, Edward had served as assistant secretary and treasurer of the Plainfield Trust Company, followed by his taking the reins of the company as the vice president of the company that would later emerge as the State Trust Company.

== Professional background ==
After arriving in North Plainfield, Feickert began expressing a passion for women's rights, along with an interest in the women's suffrage movement. She also took on a leadership role in her local congregation at Grace Episcopal Church of Plainfield. She taught mission study classes for the Episcopal Church at both the local and state levels. She also became a member of local chapters of the Daughters of the American Revolution, Woman's Christian Temperance Union, and the New Jersey Woman Suffrage Association.

=== New Jersey Woman Suffrage Association ===
In 1910, Clara Laddey, President of the New Jersey Woman Suffrage Association appointed Feickert to serve as the organization's enrollment chairman. She served in this capacity for two years, quadrupling membership with a series of door-to-door campaigns and rallies during this time, and was consequently elected president of the association in 1912. Over the next eight years, she sharpened her political skills, as well as her leadership ability, and increased membership to over 120,000 members. Feickert was chosen as the leader of the New Jersey suffrage movement and represented them in attempts to gain the right to vote. After failing to have a state suffrage amendment approved in 1915, she worked harder than ever before and was selected to lead several organizations in their attempt to have the federal suffrage amendment ratified. The state legislature officially ratified the amendment on February 10, 1920.

=== New Jersey State Republican Party ===
In 1920, the New Jersey State Republican Party recognized Feickert's achievements and named her vice-chairman of the New Jersey Republican State Committee. With this position, Feickert was assigned the job of organizing the Republican women in New Jersey. At the same time, she was also appointed treasurer of the New Jersey League of Women Voters, a position she left approximately a year later due to a difference of opinion regarding the direction the organization was headed. With more time on her hands, Lillian began focusing her attention on the New Jersey Women's Republican Club, of which she was president. Financial backing from the Republican organization allowed membership to reach up to 100,000 members.

As a firm supporter of Prohibition and insistent women's rights activist, the Republican party cut off funding to the NJWRC and failed to re-elect Feickert as vice-chairman of the New Jersey Republican State Committee in 1925. The New Jersey Women's Republican Club slowly began to fall apart and was eventually replaced by the Women's State Republican Club of New Jersey in 1929. Feickert unsuccessfully ran for the United States Senate in 1928 as a pro-Prohibition candidate. She received 26,029 votes out of 574,294 cast in the Republican primary, being defeated by the eventual winner of the general election, banker Hamilton F. Kean.

After her failed attempt at Senate and the defeat of Prohibition, Feickert stepped away from politics. Having divorced her husband in 1925, her remaining years were spent working on her home, reading, and traveling. She died of a cerebral hemorrhage at Saint Vincent's Hospital in New York City on January 21, 1945.
