= Clara Schlee Laddey =

German-born American suffragist (1856–1932)

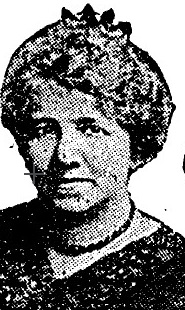
- Clara Schlee Laddey, from a 1915 newspaper
- Born: Clara Schlee; April 6, 1856; Stuttgart
- Died: September 11, 1932; Alton, New Hampshire
- Occupation(s): Suffragist, pacifist, lecturer

Clara Schlee Laddey (April 6, 1856 – September 11, 1932) was a German-born American suffragist and lecturer on women's rights.

== Early life ==
Clara Schlee was born in Stuttgart, the daughter of Adolf I. Schlee and Pauline Steimie. She studied music in Stuttgart and at a finishing school in Switzerland. At age 16, she attended the first meeting of a women's organization in Germany, and recited a poem at the event.

== Career ==
Laddey was a lecturer on women's rights and a member of local women's clubs in New Jersey. She was president of the Civic Club of Arlington from 1905 to 1908, and president of the New Jersey Woman's Suffrage Association from 1908 to 1912. She attended the National American Woman Suffrage Association's annual meeting in Seattle in 1909, and led the New Jersey contingent in a suffrage parade in New York City in 1912. She made "suffragette cheese" from her own secret recipe, which the New Jersey association sold as a fundraiser at event booths. When she completed her term as president of the New Jersey suffragists, she was succeeded by Lillian Feickert, the association's enrollment chair.

Laddey used her German-language skills to speak to immigrant women in Wisconsin, Ohio, and Pennsylvania about suffrage. In 1913 Laddey attended the International Women's Suffrage Congress in Budapest. In 1920, she was a founding member of the New Jersey state chapter of the League of Women Voters.

In 1931 and 1932, she was finance chair of the Women's International League for Peace and Freedom (WILPF), and in this capacity toured in the western United States, lecturing with Katherine Devereux Blake.

== Personal life ==
Schlee married Victor H. G. Laddey in 1876. They had three children, John, Eric, and Paula, before they family moved to the United States in 1888. Paula Laddey became a lawyer and clubwoman in New Jersey. Victor Laddey died in 1929; Clara Schlee Laddey died in 1932, aged 76 years, in Alton, New Hampshire.
