= Melinda Scott =

English-American labor organizer

- Scott, from a 1915 publication
- Born: October 18, 1876; Stockport, England
- Died: August 7, 1954 (aged 77); Union, New Jersey, U.S.
- Occupations: Hat trimmer, labor organizer

Melinda Scott (October 18, 1876 – August 7, 1954) was an English-born American labor organizer and suffragist. She was president of the New York Women's Trade Union League, and active in national roles with the Women's Trade Union League (WTUL) and the United Textile Workers of America.

== Early life and education ==
Scott was born in Stockport, England, the daughter of Henry Scott. Her father was hatter, and she worked as a hat trimmer in England as a young woman.

== Career ==
After she moved to New Jersey in 1896, Scott was a leader of the Organized Hat Trimmers of Newark. In 1907 she organized English-speaking workers in the New York Women's Trade Union League (WTUL), and was elected president of the league in 1910. She also held national office in the WTUL. She was president of the United Cloth Hat and Cap Makers of North America local 14569. She joined in the 1911 New York laundry workers strike.

She presided at a rally for working women at Cooper Union in 1914. and made a presentation to Woodrow Wilson about the rights of working women, including this plea: "We hear about the sacredness of the home. What sacredness is there about a home when it is turned into a factory, where we find a mother, very often with a child at her breast, running a sewing machine? Running up third-seven seams for a cent?" In 1915 she was featured at the National Women's Trade Union League of America conference in New York City. In 1916 she and other suffragists, including Inez Milholland, and Alva Belmont, spoke to striking dressmakers at the Manhattan Lyceum, and traveled by train to the western states on a tour for the Congressional Union for Woman Suffrage.

During World War I she held various roles in organizing women for war work. In 1923 she spoke as a representative of the United Textile Workers of America at the Women's Industrial Conference in Washington, D.C. Later in her life, Scott worked in various jobs, including her final position at the Newark City Tax Office.

== Publications ==
- "Senators vs. Working Women" (1912)
- "Labor Legislation for Women" (1923)

== Personal life ==
Scott died in 1954, at the age of 77, in Union, New Jersey.
