= Mary Philbrook =

American lawyer

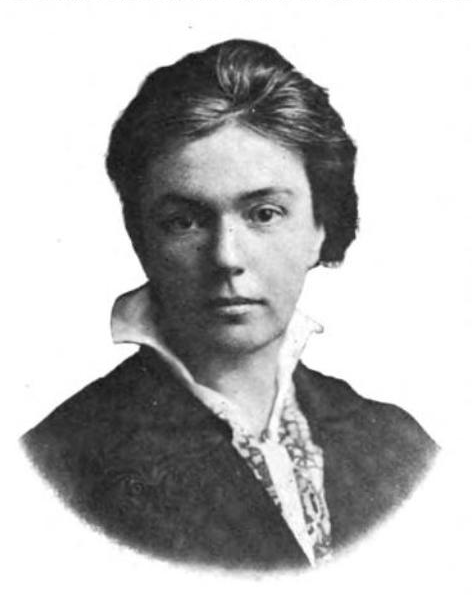
Mary Philbrook c. 1917

Mary Philbrook (1872–1958) was the first female attorney in New Jersey, and the first female to be admitted to the bar association in New Jersey. The New Jersey Supreme Court initially refused Philbrook's petition in 1894 on the grounds that no other woman in the state had ever sought admission to the bar. Supporting the New Jersey Woman Suffrage Association, she lobbied in the New Jersey legislature to allow women to practice law. She was finally admitted to the bar in 1895. She used her legal training for the advancement of women's rights, the social settlement movement in Jersey City, and the gender-free writing of the New Jersey Constitution of 1947. As a result, she is known as a prominent New Jersey woman in the fight for equal rights.

== Early life ==
Philbrook was born in Washington, D.C., on August 6, 1872. Her parents were Rebecca Elizabeth Stearns (1845-?) and Harry Baxter Philbrook (1840–1921). She was the eldest of three siblings: Florence, Robert, and Elizabeth. Her father had a successful law practice in New York City, and her mother was a descendant of Isaac Stearns, who came from England to Salem, MA in 1630. Philbrook worked as a stenographer and gained early legal experience at two law offices in Hoboken, New Jersey.

The fact that Mary had not attended college, law school, or even finished high school was not a barrier to her admission as a lawyer. At the time, candidates could simply apply to take the bar exam—and indeed, across 30 other states, some 300 female lawyers were already practicing. However, the New Jersey court ruled that "[a] woman is not, under of her citizenship, vested by the Constitution . . . with any absolute right. . . to practice as an attorney."

In 1895, New Jersey suffragists, including Cecilia Gaines the President of the Jersey City Woman's Club, lobbied the legislature to pass a law allowing women to become lawyers in New Jersey. Mary Philbrook was the first to be admitted. She worked for the law firm of Bacot and Record in Jersey City before starting her practice. In 1902 Philbrook moved her law practice to Newark where she organized her first statewide Legal Aid Society. In 1906 she was admitted to practice before the United States Supreme Court. She was the first woman from New Jersey to be so appointed.

== Activism ==
Philbrook volunteered to be counsel for the Legal Aid Society at Cornelia Bradford's Whittier House in lower Jersey City. Here she helped Mabel Smith Douglass and the College Club of Jersey City to promote the founding of New Jersey College for Women (now Douglass College).

During the suffrage campaign, Philbrook supported the militant activism of Alice Paul and her National Woman's Party in Washington, D.C. After writing the passage of the 19th Amendment, Philbrook worked with Alice Paul on the passage of the equal rights amendment.

In 1947, Philbrook changed the wording of the New Jersey Constitution to ensure equal rights for men and women. As a result, the word "persons" is used to include both sexes.

== Death and legacy ==
Philbrook died on September 2, 1958, at the age 86 in Point Pleasant, New Jersey.

Every year, the Rutgers School of Law – Camden presents the Mary Philbrook Public Interest Award to a distinguished individual who has honoured the spirit of Mary Philbrook by serving the public interest in the legal field. The award is presented at a gala dinner that also honours law school students who have particularly distinguished themselves in public interest law.

== See also ==
- List of first women lawyers and judges in New Jersey
