= William Francis Magie =

American physicist (1858–1943)

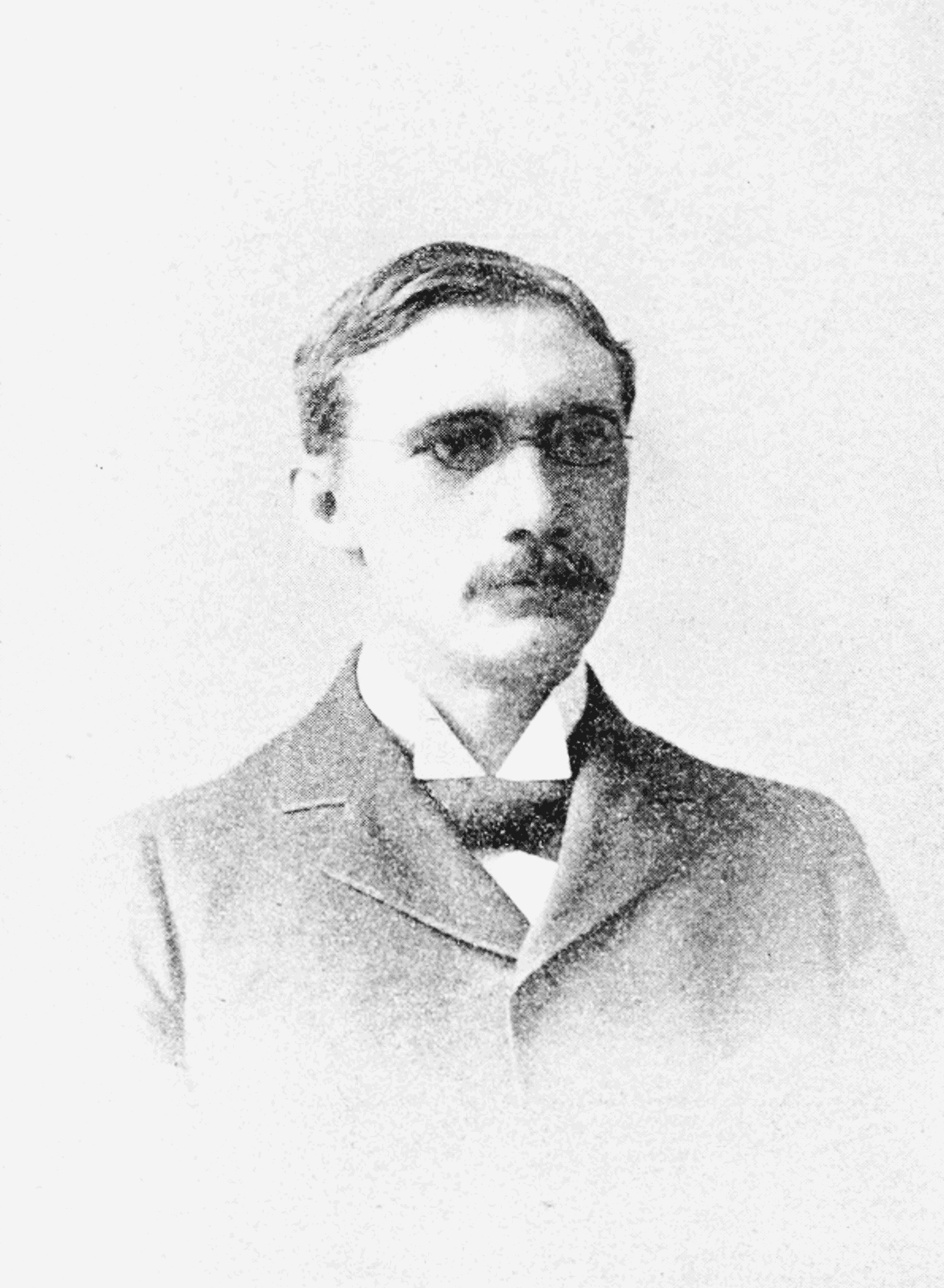
c. 1904/1905

William Francis Magie (1858–1943) was an American physicist, a founder of the American Physical Society (president from 1910 to 1912) and the first professor of physics at Princeton University, where he had graduated (class valedictorian, 1879) and where he served for two decades as dean of the faculty. His papers on the contact angle of liquids and solids and on the specific heat of solutions were notable, as was his text Principles of Physics. He was an elected member of the American Philosophical Society (1896).

== Personal views ==
Magie served as the president of the Men's Anti-Suffrage League of New Jersey. In this capacity, he argued that women's suffrage would ruin the family structure, destroy gender roles, and "undermine civilization."

== Selected works ==
- Magie, William Francis, editor, translator. (1899). The Second Law of Thermodynamics at Google Books: Memoirs by Carnot, Clausius and Thomson.
- Magie, William Francis. (1911). Principles of physics, designed for use as a textbook of general physics. New York: Century. Principles of physics at Google Books
- Magie, William Francis. (1935). A Source Book in Physics. Cambridge: Harvard University Press. Includes selections and translations of classic works in physics. A source book in physics at Google Books
