= Mina Van Winkle =

American suffragist

Wilhelmina Caroline Ginger Van Winkle
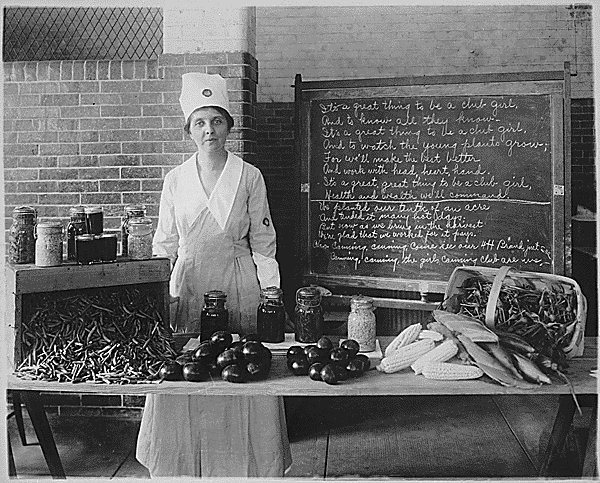
- Van Winkle, in Food Administration uniform, promoting victory gardening in World War I
- Born: Wilhelmina Caroline Ginger; March 26, 1875; New York City, U.S.
- Died: January 16, 1933 (aged 57)
- Other name: Mina Van Winkle
- Education: New York School of Philanthropy (1905)
- Spouse: Abraham Van Winkle

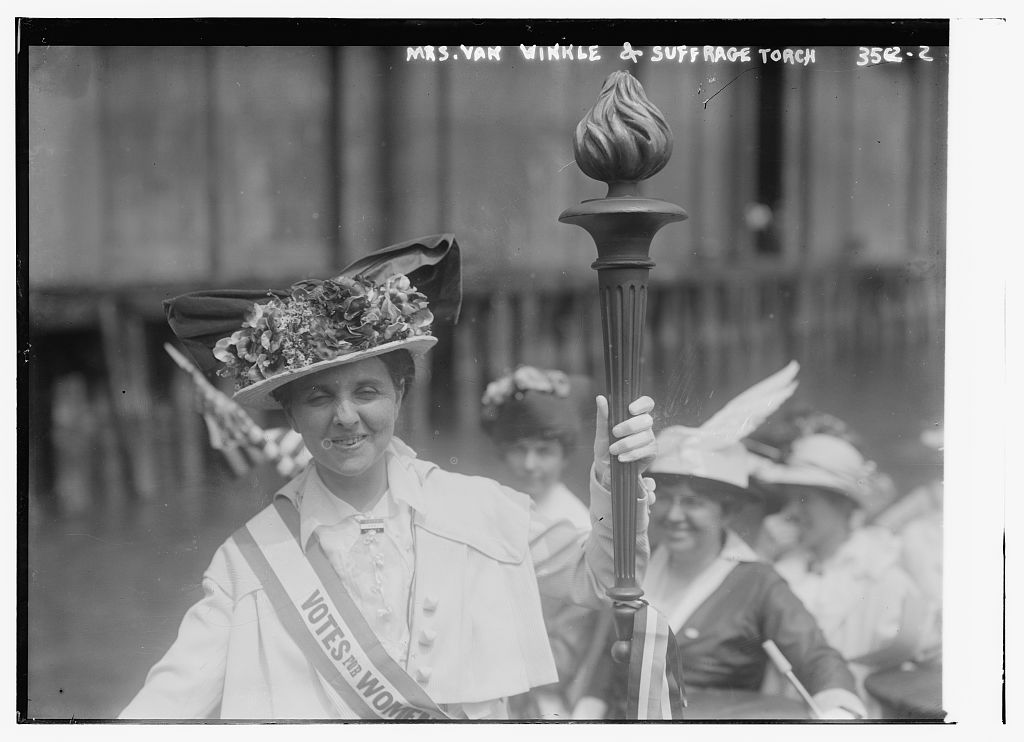
Van Winkle in 1915 carrying a suffrage torch

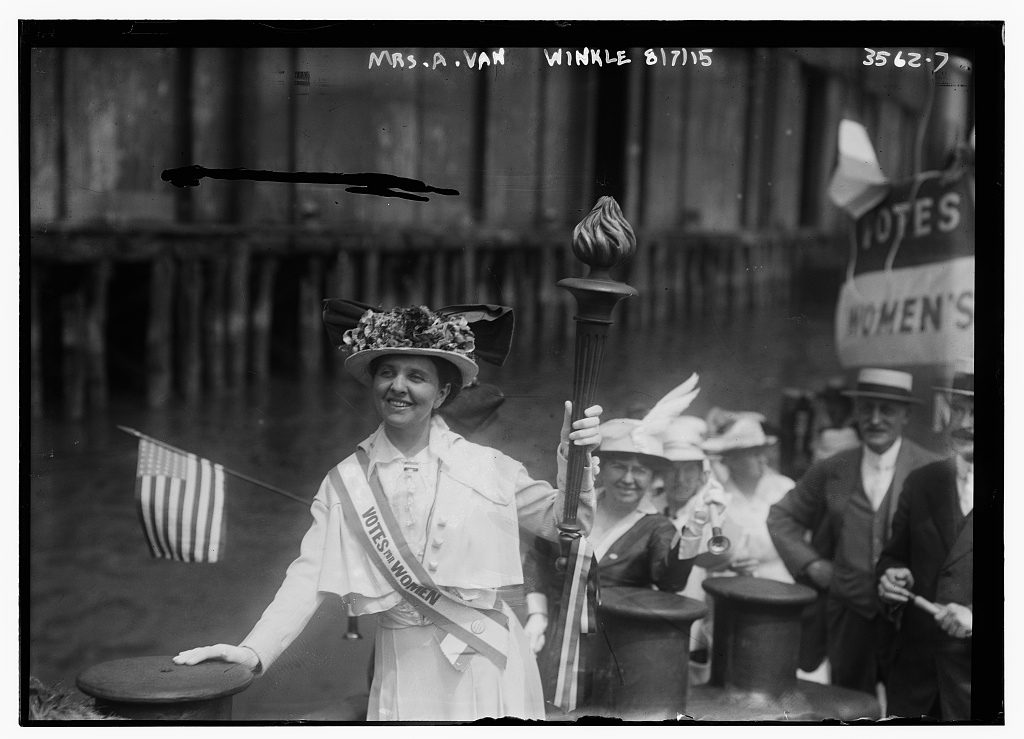
Mina Van Winkle on August 7, 1915

Mina Caroline Ginger Van Winkle (March 26, 1875 – January 16, 1933) was a crusading social worker, suffragist, and groundbreaking police lieutenant. From 1919 until her death in 1933, she led the Women's Bureau of the Metropolitan Police Department of the District of Columbia (in Washington D.C.), and became a national leader in the protection of girls and other women during the law enforcement and judicial process. Her provocative statements about gender and morality in the Jazz Age brought her further national attention.

== Biography ==
She was born Wilhelmina ("Mina") Caroline Ginger in New York City in 1875. From 1902 to 1905, she worked at Fernwood Home, a municipal reform school for girls in Glen Ridge, New Jersey. She graduated in 1905 from the social work program of the New York School of Philanthropy.

In 1905, while associated with the National Consumers League and the Newark Bureau of Associated Charities, she exposed the harsh conditions in which immigrant child laborers from Italy worked in New Jersey farm fields.

On October 27, 1906, she became the second wife of Abraham Van Winkle, wealthy president of a manufacturing company (and a widower 36 years her senior) who had financially supported the Bureau of Associated Charities. During their marriage, she engaged in social work on a volunteer basis. Her husband died on September 30, 1915, at age 76. She resided in Newark, New Jersey, until approximately 1917.

=== Suffragist ===
In 1908, Van Winkle organized the Equality League of Self-Supporting Women of New Jersey, which in 1912 was renamed the Women's Political Union of New Jersey. She was the head of New Jersey chapter of the Union at the stage when the American suffrage movement clashed with eastern political machines and supporters of lawful drinking fearful that suffrage would lead to prohibition. Her tenure as president of the Union included 1915's unsuccessful effort to amend New Jersey's constitution by referendum to give women the right to vote. Following that defeat, the New Jersey chapter of the Union merged into the New Jersey Woman Suffrage Association, whose officers governed the resulting organization.

Near the beginning of the presidential election year of 1916 (and several months after her husband's 1915 death), she announced that she would establish a legal residence in Kansas, which had extended to women the right to vote in presidential elections. It is unclear whether she carried through with that announcement.

As the suffrage movement was on the verge of succeeding through the passage of the Nineteenth Amendment to the U.S. Constitution, she was a speaker at the 1920 National Woman's Party convention.

=== U.S. Food Administration official ===
Soon after the United States' entry into World War I, the Food and Fuel Control Act of 1917 established the United States Food Administration, with a mandate to voluntarily reduce the domestic consumption of food and produce, while increasing home production. President Woodrow Wilson appointed future president Herbert Hoover as its head, and Hoover appointed Van Winkle to organize and direct its speakers' bureau.

=== Police lieutenant ===
In 1916, the Metropolitan Police Department of the District of Columbia began to hire policewomen. In the summer of 1918, Police Major and Superintendent Raymond W. Pulliam established a woman's bureau, originally directed by Marion O. Spingarn. By October of that year, Van Winkle was one of four members of the Bureau. After Spingarn left in February 1919, Van Winkle became the Bureau's director, with an initial rank of detective sergeant (and, by December 1920, as a lieutenant).

The Bureau's initial responsibilities included "girl welfare work," prevention and detection of store crimes, and supervision of movie theatres, dance halls, and similar places. However, its greatest emphasis was on casework. Van Winkle stated that "prevention and protection are more primary than prosecution, and those who have done wrong should be intelligently aided toward a better life." Most of the officers in the Bureau in 1920 were trained as school teachers, nurses, or social workers, and included one lawyer.

The Bureau's creation became controversial on Capitol Hill. In December 1920, a U.S. House appropriations subcommittee questioned Van Winkle and District Commissioner Charles W. Kutz. Subcommittee members Rep. George Tinkham (a Republican from Massachusetts) (and Rep. Thomas U. Sisson, a Democrat from Mississippi) objected that Congress had not specifically appropriated funds for a bureau of policewomen. Colonel Kutz responded that Congress had specifically appropriated funds for police officers, and "there is nothing in the law that requires that policemen shall be of the male sex." During the hearing, Tinkham, an opponent of women's suffrage, asked Van Winkle dozens of questions. When asked why she was doing this work, she replied, "because I have nothing else to do; it is my job in life." Ultimately, the Subcommittee did not withhold the Bureau's appropriation.

In 1919, during a U.S. House Committee hearing that was ostensibly about the salaries of police officers in the District, Van Winkle claimed that the editor-publisher of the Washington Post, Edward McLean, had vowed that he "was going to close up the Bureau" and get rid of two of its officers, one of whom (Carolyn Harding Votaw) was a sister of then-Senator Warren G. Harding. In describing the context of those statements, she gave a suggestive account that involved divergent interests of McLean and the Bureau in the welfare of an unidentified young girl who she said was a material witness in a "white slave" trafficking investigation. McLean later testified that his objection was that the Bureau had taken the girl from a hospital and was detaining her without charge. He denied that he had asked that anyone be fired (let alone the sister of a senator whom McLean considered a friend), but expressed his view that the Bureau was "rather a dangerous toy for a sincere woman to play with," referring to Van Winkle.

From 1919 until the time of her death, she was president and chief financial contributor of the International Association of Policewomen.

In 1922, a more senior officer in the Metropolitan Police Department of the District of Columbia charged Van Winkle with insubordination when she refused to release two teenage girls to the custody of two men purporting to be their fathers, because the men's identities had not yet been verified. Her defense against the charge was highly publicized, and served to attract further publicity to the particular role of the Women's Bureau within the Department.

=== Death ===
She died on January 16, 1933.

== Legacy ==
From 1919 until the time of her death, she was president and chief financial contributor of the International Association of Policewomen. The organization was disbanded following her death, but was resurrected in 1956 as the International Association of Police Women (later renamed the International Association of Women Police).

== Views ==
Noting that almost all prostitutes suffered from venereal disease, Van Winkle described such diseases as "the penalty for prostitution", and told the House Subcommittee that prostitutes should not be jailed. But she also testified before the Senate Committee on the District of Columbia in favor of a bill that would have expanded the definition of "prostitution" to include, among other things, "indiscriminate sexual intercourse" even when it is not for hire, and would have criminalized any "indecent or obscene act", explaining that the bill was necessary "so we can take a girl and have authority to treat her if she needs treatment."

When asked in 1925 to explain the meaning of the phrase "indecent music" (which was used in a Police Department order forbidding it), she described it as "that tom-tommy sort of Oriental music that makes men forget home and babies." After initially describing the saxophone as positively immoral, she qualified her position, recognizing that "saxophone music is beautiful when played correctly, but when played by certain types of musicians it is very degrading."

In a 1928 speech, she blamed the "incompetence" of older generations for the delinquency of "flaming youth". "Our mothers were kept in a sublime state of ignorance by their parents. They were utterly incompetent to help us, or to give us an understanding of life." She described automobile rides, with their problems for the girl, hip flasks, petting and all the other "failings" of the modern girl as an unsolvable problem for mothers who were trained in the philosophy of Little Women.

In 1928, Van Winkle told a reporter that "Washington is the mecca for all psychopathic women of the nation," who come to the City "with their distorted stories about men high in our nation's life," and accuse those men of being their lovers, or husbands, or the center of some weirdly dramatic situation. She explained that, due to the vigilance of the Women's Bureau, the government officials and other well-known Washingtonians accused of serious misdemeanors often do not even know they have been involved, because policewomen intercept such women, sending some to insane asylums and others home to their husbands, fathers, or brothers.

When questioned in 1920 by Rep. Tinkham about why all members of the Women's Bureau were unmarried, Van Winkle explained that, "I really do not personally approve of having married women away from their families, and we think it would be bad for the work to have her divided attention, as our work demands our whole attention." Speaking more generally in 1928, she stated that "the average wage-earning wife is not intelligent enough to manage both home and job," and "most women who babble of careers would be better off as homemakers."

She told a journalist in 1928 that, "first of all, the policewoman must be a lady. She must be born as well as made for her job. From her background she must draw innate refinement, innate tact and a finely adjusted sense of values that can be had only from early training of the right kind."
