= Pioneers of Alaska =

Alaskan fraternal organization

- Emblem of the Pioneers of Alaska
- Formation: 1907; 119 years ago
- Type: Fraternal organization
- Website: www.pioneersofalaska.org

The Pioneers of Alaska is a fraternal organization based out of Nome, Alaska, focused on preserving the history of early non-Native settlers in the territory. The organization operates through local chapters called Igloos and historically provided mutual aid, civic engagement, and historical preservation support. Today, the Pioneers have approximately 3,100 members, who must be residents of Alaska for at least 20 years to be eligible to join.

The purpose of the Pioneers is stated as "to preserve the names of all Alaska's pioneers on its rolls; to collect and preserve the literature and incidents of our history; and to promote the best interests of Alaska."

== History ==
=== Founding and early years (1907–1920s) ===
Discussions about forming a fraternal organization dedicated to preserving Alaska's early settler history and providing mutual support began in Nome during the winter of 1902–1903. In a meeting held on February 7, 1907, in the office of Dr. Will Chase and Dr. Southward in the Nome Bank Building, 28 men formed a temporary organization and appointed a committee to draft a constitution and bylaws.

On February 14, 1907, the permanent organization was established under the name Pioneers of Alaska, designating local chapters as Igloos. Nome became Igloo No. 1. The constitution and by-laws adopted at this meeting, with only minor modifications, remain in effect. The first officers were: J. J. Chambers (President), R. B. Milroy (Vice President), Conrad Seim (Secretary and Historian), P. N. Webb (Treasurer), and George Standley (Sergeant-at-Arms). Following the meeting, a letter inviting formation of additional igloos was sent to outlying camps.

The organization expanded within its first year. Igloos were established at Candle in June 1907 and St. Michael in October 1907. Under the constitution, the formation of three Igloos led to the creation of a governing body called the Grand Igloo. Representatives of the three chapters met in Nome on August 4, 1908, formally establishing the Grand Igloo Pioneers of Alaska on September 4, 1908, with W. P. Watt elected as the first Grand President.

Other early gatherings influenced the formation of a permanent society. For example, a meeting called to arrange final rites for Richard Harris brought together many long-time residents, during which a motion was made to formalize a pioneer organization. By January 25, 1908, prospective membership had grown beyond the original eighty-seven. At that meeting, the constitution's Article One defined the organization's name and objectives:

"This society shall be known as the '87 Alaska Pioneers. Its objects are: To cultivate social intercourse and form a more perfect union among its members; to create a fund for charitable purposes on their behalf; and to perpetuate the old-time friendships and early history of the territory."

Article Two established membership eligibility:

"All residents of Alaska prior to the last day of December, 1887 (except Indians), shall be eligible."

Subsequently, additional Igloos were chartered throughout the territory, ultimately reaching a peak of 35 chapters. By the 1910s and 1920s, the Pioneers of Alaska operated in most major population centers, functioning as both a fraternal and civic organization in the Alaska Territory.

=== Membership expansion and organizational growth ===
In 1911, the Grand Igloo authorized the creation of a Women's Auxiliary, initially open to wives, mothers, and sisters of Pioneers, as well as women who had resided in Alaska before December 31, 1900, and all native-born white children. These children were enrolled in the Native Sons and Daughters of Alaska, becoming active, dues-paying members upon reaching age sixteen.

That same year, the Grand Igloo approved a fifteen percent dues assessment to fund construction of a Pioneer Home near Fairbanks. However, in 1913, the Alaska Legislature assumed responsibility for the project by establishing the Pioneer Home at Sitka, relieving the organization of direct oversight.

In 1913, Igloo No. 6 was organized in Juneau, incorporating these early pioneers as charter members. This facilitated formation of additional Igloos at Valdez (No. 7), Iditarod (No. 8), and Seward (No. 9). By the early 1920s the organization had grown to include approximately 24 Igloos, four Women's Auxiliaries, and an estimated 2,240 members.

=== Role in territorial Alaska ===
In the absence of comprehensive territorial or federal social services during Alaska's early territorial period, local Igloos assisted elderly, disabled, or financially hard-hit members. They organized community events, raised funds for disaster relief, and advocated for infrastructure improvements, including transportation and public facilities.

In 1912, the federal government granted Alaska territorial status. That same year, the Territorial Legislature extended citizenship and suffrage to women, and the Grand Igloo extended membership rights to women, eight years before women nationwide gained the right to vote.

Several members of the Alaska Territorial Legislature prided themselves on being Pioneers of Alaska.

The organization also collected artifacts, recorded personal reminiscences, and contributed to early libraries and museums, playing a significant role in documenting Alaska's settler history during its transition from territory to statehood.

=== Later developments ===
As of the twenty-first century, the Pioneers of Alaska continue to operate through subordinate Igloos across the state, with both men's and women's Igloos active. The organization holds an annual Grand Igloo Convention, attended by delegates from subordinate Igloos, at which officers are elected to represent the entire organization for the coming year.

== Membership ==
Membership was originally restricted to white men who entered Alaska before January 1, 1900. Article 2 of their original constitution from 1907 stated, "All residents of Alaska prior to the last day of December, 1887 (except Indians), shall be eligible." This reinforced the organization's identity as a body of "old-timers" while excluding many Indigenous residents, immigrants, and later arrivals. Early documentation about the Pioneers of Alaska's race requirements contradicts some contemporary framing, in which some Igloos report that the requirements on the application were intended to help identify "those who died on the trail or alone in a remote cabin".

By 1911, the Grand Igloo established the Women's Auxiliary, allowing female relatives of Pioneers and long-time Alaska residents to participate. Women were officially included starting in 1912, initially through auxiliary roles, while native-born white children could join as Native Sons and Daughters of Alaska until age sixteen. At that point, they became active members. This structure ensured the continuity of the organization's legacy throughout the Territory. Women's groups gained full Igloo status in 2004, and full integration of leadership roles across gender lines was achieved in 2012. As of 2023, there are 15 women's Igloos in operation. In the same year, one Igloo location made history by merging its men's and women's Igloos into a single, unified Igloo, effectively eliminating the gender distinction. Other locations are reportedly considering similar transitions.

Racial restrictions were formally removed in 1982, though historical membership remained predominantly white.

=== Local chapters (Igloos) ===
The Pioneers of Alaska are organized into local chapters called Igloos, which serve as the primary units of membership and local activity. A number and a city or regional designation identify each Igloo. The first Igloo, Igloo No. 1, was established in Nome in 1907, shortly after the organization's founding. By 1908, three Igloos existed, prompting the creation of the Grand Igloo to coordinate statewide activities and governance.

At the organization's peak, there were approximately 35 Igloos across Alaska, located in both urban and rural communities. Igloos have historically included both men's and women's divisions, with some Igloos later merging to form combined chapters. The Grand Igloo serves as the governing body, with delegates from each subordinate Igloo participating in annual conventions to elect officers and oversee organizational business.

As of the mid-2020s, many Igloos remain active in communities such as Anchorage, Fairbanks, Juneau, Ketchikan, Sitka, Cordova, Homer, Seward, Nome, Kodiak, Valdez, Wrangell, and Delta Junction. Other Igloos have become inactive or sunsetted due to declining membership, community changes, or the consolidation of men's and women's chapters. Some Igloos, such as Igloo No. 6 in Juneau and Igloo No. 19 in Cordova, continue to host events, engage in historical preservation, and support civic projects, reflecting the Pioneers' ongoing role in local communities.

=== Application process and terms ===
Current membership in the Pioneers of Alaska is open to men and women who are U.S. citizens of "good moral character" and have been long-term residents of Alaska. Applicants must have lived in the state for at least seven months in each of twenty cumulative years and for at least seven months immediately before applying. Applicants are typically required to provide a brief biographical history of their time in Alaska, which becomes part of the historical archives of the Igloo to which they apply.

Some igloos, such as Anchorage's Men's Igloo 15 and Women's Igloo 4, allow qualifying individuals to submit membership applications in person at regular business meetings or social events at Pioneer Hall, or through the Men's and Women's Membership Committees.

Prospective members submit a formal application providing personal information, residency history, and references. The application must be endorsed by two members in good standing of the local Igloo to which the applicant is applying and accompanied by the required initiation fee and dues. Members who move within Alaska may request a transfer card to join a new Igloo, while those temporarily leaving the state can obtain a clearance card to maintain good standing during their absence. Dual membership in more than one Igloo is permitted, though members may only represent one Igloo as a delegate at the annual Grand Igloo convention.

== Controversies ==
=== Ku Klux Klan associations ===
During the 1910s and 1920s, some prominent civic leaders in Alaska who were also active in fraternal organizations, including the Pioneers of Alaska, were affiliated with the Ku Klux Klan, which maintained 11 chapters in Alaska. Archival research indicates that some individual Pioneers members simultaneously held leadership roles within Klan organizations and/or dual membership, particularly in Southeast Alaska. The Pioneers as an institution, however, had no formal affiliation with the Ku Klux Klan. Historians have noted these overlapping memberships as part of a broader pattern of Klan integration into civic networks.

==== Documented Klan officers and members ====
The following members of the Pioneers of Alaska have been documented as holding leadership roles or formal positions within Ku Klux Klan organizations:

- Cash Cole — Exalted Cyclops, Mount Juneau Klavern No. 2.
- Norman B. Cook — Kligrapp, Mount Juneau Klavern No. 2.
- W. E. Feero — Night Hawk, Mount Juneau Klavern No. 2.
- J. R. Guerin — Klaliff, Mount Juneau Klavern No. 2.
- Ira Tucker — Klokann, Mount Juneau Klavern No. 2.
- Glenn Kirkham — Kludd, Mount Juneau Klavern No. 2.
- E. F. Kirchofer — Klokan, Mount Juneau Klavern No. 2.
- C. F. McNutt — Klexter, Mount Juneau Klavern No. 2.

==== Documented participation and association ====
- W. M. Eddy — Listed as a guest at a Ku Klux Klan organization event in Nome in 1901.
- D. R. B. Glenn — Listed as a guest at a Ku Klux Klan organization event in Nome in 1901.
- C. J. Woofter — Featured in a 1924 article in The Fellowship Forum, a publication affiliated with the Ku Klux Klan, in which he expressed support for the newspaper's circulation among Alaska Masons.
- Johan Martin Adolph Sørensen — Listed as a shareholder of the Independent Publishing Company, publisher of The Fellowship Forum, in a statement published on October 8, 1927. The publication identified hundreds of shareholders nationwide, including two individuals residing in Alaska: John C. Jacobson of Fairbanks and John Sundbach of Nome.

Some individual members and affiliates in the list above, as well as other members of the Pioneers of Alaska, including, but not limited to, Elmer J. "Stroller" White (President of the Juneau Men's Igloo No. 6 in 1922 and 1923.), H. R. Shepard (Grand Igloo Member, 1931), and George Moody (Grand Secretary/Member, Pioneers Igloo 4, Fairbanks), were documented as expressing opposition to Alaska Natives gaining the right to vote. Contemporary newspaper articles associated with these members included derogatory commentary about "illiterate natives", opposition to Native lawyer William Paul, and support for literacy tests that restricted Native voting. While the Pioneers of Alaska have a historical record of Native exclusion, there is no evidence that the organization as a whole formally opposed Native suffrage in the 1920s. Nevertheless, individual members expressing such views were reportedly allowed to remain in the organization and, in some cases, maintain membership/leadership in other groups, including the Ku Klux Klan and the American Legion, that disenfranchised or opposed the advancement of people of color in the Territory.

=== Minstrel performers ===
Several members of the Pioneers of Alaska, including John T. Spickett and Clarence "Cash" Cole, participated in minstrel shows organized by fraternal groups such as the Benevolent and Protective Order of Elks (B.P.O. Elks).

John T. Spickett (1858–1939), an English-born actor, theatrical producer, Juneau postmaster, and Grand President of the Pioneers of Alaska, was a life member of Juneau Lodge No. 420 B.P.O. Elks. He played a central role in the lodge's early development, serving as one of its first secretaries and organizing minstrel shows well into his later years; the final performance he supervised was dedicated to him. Spickett had previously performed with Haverly's Minstrels and at the 1891 Chicago World's Fair.

Cash Cole (1891–1959), a Juneau businessman, Republican politician, and President of Juneau Men's Igloo in 1938, also held membership in the Elks and participated in numerous shows and ensembles. Clarence J. Woofter was active in Juneau's fraternal and cultural life in the early 1920s and by 1953 was a Grand Officer for the Pioneers of Alaska, representing Fairbanks. His wife, known locally as "Klondy," performed violin in community events, including the 1922 "Moose Minstrels" at Spickett's Palace Theater. Archival records show these productions featured actors in blackface and accompanying orchestras, reflecting racially stereotyped performances common in minstrel shows of the period.

Fraternal Organizations in the early 20th century provided spaces where minstrel shows could thrive, serving as bonding opportunities, fundraisers, and entertainment. The Elks, founded in New York City in 1868 by actor Charles Algernon Sidney Vivian, was originally established to support minstrel performers in need after the death of a colleague from illness and financial hardship. Many Pioneers of Alaska members held dual membership in these predominantly white, male organizations.

While widely attended and accepted at the time, these performances are now recognized as offensive. The participation of Spickett, Cole, and Woofter illustrates the social and cultural role of musical performance and minstrel shows in Alaska's early 20th-century fraternal & community organizations.

=== Kyan pole relocation and ownership dispute ===
Beginning in the early 20th century, a totem pole honoring Tlingit Chief George Kyan (also spelled Kian or Kayan), originally carved and erected in downtown Ketchikan, became the subject of a local custodial dispute involving Igloo No. 16 of the Pioneers of Alaska. The pole, a lineage monument featuring figures such as the Crane, Thunderbird, and Bear representing Kyan's family and relationships, was part of Indigenous cultural traditions and stood on land later incorporated into the town's urban layout.

In the early 1920s, the land on which the pole stood was sold by a member of the Kyan family, and in 1924, the house on the lot was demolished. The pole was then given to the Pioneers of Alaska, who relocated it to the Pioneer Hall grounds at considerable expense, where the organization maintained it and kept it on display. Archival correspondence from April 1939, preserved in organizational records, notes:

"...We find, looking through our past records, that we are unable to locate any written agreement of the transfer of the Kayan Pole from the Kyan family to Igloo No. 16. City records show that in 1920 lot 11 block 18 had a lot with totem pole and house; this was sold to Ingersole Realty Co. of Ketchikan by a member of Kyan family; lot transferred to W.A. Thompson—then W.I. Collings of Ketchikan; 1924 Collings razed the house and wanted to get rid of totem pole, so he gave it to Pioneers of Alaska and at considerable expense the pole was moved to its present location. Since that time the Igloo has kept it in a fair state of repair, which would seem to justify the wish of the members of the Igloo to keep it in its present location." — B. Fitzwilliams, Secretary of the Pioneers of Alaska, to Archbold, April 29, 1939

In the late 1930s, during the Civilian Conservation Corps (CCC) Totem Pole Project, descendants of the Kyan family requested that the pole be relocated to Saxman Totem Park, a public collection of clan poles. Archival notes indicate:

"A request through Peter Kyan from his father George Kyan, asking that we take their pole and add it to the Saxman group. This request has been repeatedly made and most recently today." — Archbold, to Thompson, President of Igloo No. 16, April 19, 1939

The Pioneers resisted the transfer, arguing that:

"We sincerely hope that the descendants of the Kyan family will see fit to waive any traditional rights to the pole inasmuch as the pole belongs to Ketchikan and not to Saxman." — B. Fitzwilliams, Secretary of Pioneers of Alaska, to Archbold, April 29, 1939

The correspondence highlights the Pioneers' emphasis on maintaining the pole on its original site within downtown Ketchikan, which was Kyan family land, rather than relocating it to a park dominated by other kwáan (clan groups).

The original Chief Kyan pole deteriorated over time and was removed in 1964. Subsequent replicas, including a 1993 version carved by a member of the Tongass Tribe, have been raised in Ketchikan, including at Whale Park near the site of the original pole, reflecting contemporary efforts to honor Indigenous artistic heritage while acknowledging the contested history of earlier custodial decisions.

=== Opposition to Jewish refugee resettlement ===
Between 1938 and 1940, the Pioneers of Alaska were among several territorial civic organizations that publicly opposed proposals to allow Jewish refugees fleeing Nazi persecution to settle in Alaska. The most prominent of these proposals was the King–Havenner Bill of 1940, which was framed both as a humanitarian response to the refugee crisis and as an economic development initiative intended to promote population growth and industrial expansion in the Alaska Territory.

A congressional subcommittee reviewing the proposal received strong written opposition from major Alaska chambers of commerce and civic organizations, including the Pioneers of Alaska. Alaska Delegate Anthony J. Dimond described the Pioneers as "the old-timers of Alaska" and an organization "that should be listened to above all others." In its opposition, the organization argued that Jewish refugees were "foreigners" who could not be assimilated into Alaskan society and would constitute a threat to "American civilization."

Scholarly analyses of the 1940 hearings note that opponents of the bill argued it would create a special immigration exception for Alaska, effectively turning the territory into a testing ground for federal immigration policy. Concerns were expressed in terms of economic insecurity, potential job competition, and perceived threats to cultural cohesion. Recent research places the Pioneers' stance within a broader context of nativism, antisemitism, and territorial political assertion in the late 1930s.

The King–Havenner Bill was ultimately abandoned in 1940. Historians have cited this episode as an example of how influential territorial civic organizations, including those active in preserving Alaska's settler history, also participated in exclusionary political debates that shaped the territory's social, economic, and demographic development on the eve of World War II.

== Preservation work ==
The Pioneers have contributed to the preservation of historic sites and civic projects across Alaska, including, but not limited to:

=== Pioneer Park (Fairbanks) ===
Pioneer Park in Fairbanks originated from a proposal by the Pioneers of Alaska in the early 1960s to request public land for a historical attraction. The Pioneers formed the nonprofit Pioneer Memorial Park, Inc. to develop the site for the Alaska Centennial Exposition, commemorating the 100th anniversary of the Alaska Purchase. The park opened in 1967 as part of the exposition and was later conveyed to the City of Fairbanks and the Fairbanks North Star Borough. Originally known as Alaskaland, it was renamed Pioneer Park in 2001 to emphasize its historical focus.

The 44-acre park contains museums, historical displays, and the SS Nenana, a National Historic Landmark sternwheeler. It remains a major cultural attraction, with an estimated 350,000 annual visitors. In 2025, a borough ordinance was proposed to restore the original "Alaskaland" name in response to community feedback that the "Pioneer" designation may feel exclusionary to Alaska Native residents.

=== Pioneer Pavilion (Juneau) ===
The Pioneer Pavilion in Savikko Park (also known as Sandy Beach) in Juneau was constructed with support from civic and commercial donors, including significant contributions from Pioneers of Alaska Igloo No. 6 Dedicated in the late 2000s, the pavilion provides a covered space for performances and community gatherings. Savikko Park also includes recreational amenities such as baseball fields, trails, and picnic areas.

Local planning documents make minimal note that the pavilion is sited on lands historically associated with the Douglas Indian Village and is built over top what used to be "Tlinkat Alley". Some commentators have observed that the pavilion's design emphasizes settler heritage and does not prominently acknowledge Indigenous histories. Savikko Park, as a whole, has been the focus of discussions related to Indigenous sovereignty and recognition, including consideration of changes intended to acknowledge the area as the former home of the Tʼaaḵu Ḵwáan, whose village was destroyed and whose community was displaced through fire and other forms of systematic removal.

=== Richard Harris and Joe Juneau Memorial (Juneau) ===
A memorial in Juneau honors the founders of the local gold mining district, reflecting the Pioneers' role in commemorating territorial figures.

=== Whale statue contribution (Juneau) ===
In 2016, Igloo No. 6 contributed $10,000 toward a public whale sculpture on the Juneau Seawalk waterfront.

=== Conservation of the pioneers of Alaska murals ===
In the 2020s, the organization conserved murals depicting early Alaskan life, preserving historical artifacts while highlighting the limited inclusion of non-white participants.

=== Pioneer Hall (Ketchikan) ===
Pioneer Hall in downtown Ketchikan is a historic building owned and maintained by the Pioneers through Igloos No. 16 and No. 7. Constructed by Orlando Wells "Six-Shooter" Grant between 1899 and 1900, it initially served as a U.S. Customs office. The Pioneers purchased the building in 1922, and it has served as a meeting hall and community space since.

Pioneer Hall is a contributing property to the Ketchikan Downtown Historic District, listed on the National Register of Historic Places, and has been identified as one of Alaska's Top Ten Most Endangered Historic Properties due to structural deterioration. In 2023, the Ketchikan Pioneer Way Association was formed to coordinate restoration and rehabilitation, aiming to preserve the building's historic character while meeting modern accessibility standards.

=== Bayview Cemetery Garden (Ketchikan) ===
The Pioneers maintain this historic burial ground through landscaping, volunteer upkeep, and commemorative plantings.

=== Sitka Pioneer Home ===
The Sitka Pioneer Home is the first of Alaska's state-operated Pioneer Homes system. Established in 1913, it converted former U.S. Navy and Marine barracks into an assisted-living facility for older men who had spent most of their lives in the territory. By the 1930s, deteriorating conditions led to the construction of a new Mission Revival–style building, completed in 1934–1935 and later expanded in 1956 to accommodate women and married couples.

The Sitka Pioneer Home remains one of the largest and longest continuously operating elder care facilities in Alaska. It and the surrounding Totem Square park were listed on the National Register of Historic Places in 1979 for their architectural and historical significance. The facility serves as a model for Alaska's statewide Pioneer Homes network, with subsequent homes established in Fairbanks, Palmer, Anchorage, Ketchikan, and Juneau.

=== Igloo No. 19 building preservation (Cordova) ===
Pioneer Igloo Hall No. 19 is a historic social club building located at 621 First Street in Cordova, Alaska. Constructed in 1927–1928 by the local chapter of the Pioneers of Alaska, the log structure was designed to resemble a traditional Alaskan trapper's cabin and occupies a prominent site overlooking downtown Cordova. Built as a meeting space and community hall, the building has continued to serve community functions.

It was listed on the National Register of Historic Places in 1982. In the early twenty-first century, the hall was added to Alaska's list of endangered historic structures in 2012 and 2013, prompting restoration and rehabilitation efforts that included structural stabilization, accessibility improvements, and the preservation of early twentieth-century architectural features.

=== Father Andrew P. Kashevaroff Building (Juneau) ===
The Father Andrew P. Kashevaroff Building (APK) is named after Father Andrew P. Kashevaroff, the first curator of the Alaska State Museum Andrew Kashevaroff, a Russian Orthodox priest, played a key role in establishing the museum, the Alaska State Library, and Archives in Juneau. He worked to preserve Alaska's cultural heritage by collecting artifacts and documenting the history and ethnology of Alaska's peoples. He served as President of the Juneau Men's Igloo in 1927.

Kashevaroff served as a founder, fundraiser, and, for many years, the museum's sole employee. His background allowed him to navigate both Russian and Native Alaskan cultures while contributing to broader American historical and cultural understanding. Over his tenure, he amassed thousands of artifacts and authored numerous works on Alaskan history and ethnology.

In 2015, the state of Alaska named its new State Libraries, Archives, and Museum building in his honor. The APK building officially opened on June 6, 2016, one year before the 150th anniversary of the Alaska Purchase.

== Miscellaneous ==
The organization has 35 local chapters, which are called "igloos". The group operates the Pioneer Museum at Pioneer Park, in Fairbanks.

Noel Wien, founder of Wien Airlines, was made an honorary member of the northernmost chapter, Igloo No. 8, after successfully landing at Wiseman, Alaska on May 5, 1925.

The Anchorage chapter of the Pioneers of Alaska made President Warren G. Harding an honorary member during his "Voyage of Understanding" visit to Alaska in 1923. Their declaration noted, "The recipient shall not be liable for the payment of dues, nor shall he be entitled to vote or hold office, but he shall enjoy all the privileges of the society." Thus, the president of the United States was ineligible to chair a Pioneers meeting at a cafe. The organization also sent Harding some official buttons.

China Joe was a Chinese Alaskan businessman and community figure in Juneau, Alaska, and is notable as one of the few people of color documented as having been formally associated with the Pioneers of Alaska, specifically a charter member of the "87" Alaska Pioneers Association and Pioneers of Alaska Men's Igloo 6. At the time, membership in the organization was restricted by racial eligibility requirements. China Joe's inclusion was therefore exceptional rather than typical, as he did not meet the organization's membership standards then in effect. Regional historical accounts and local folklore frequently reference two narratives associated with him: one describing his role as a baker who provided food to prospectors during a severe winter, and another noting that he was permitted to remain in the area when other Chinese laborers working at a nearby mine were expelled.

China Joe was known by several names during his lifetime. His grave marker identifies him as Hi Chung, with the inscription "China Joe." He died in 1917, and contemporary reports described his funeral procession as one of the largest in Juneau at the time. According to later accounts, when a local pioneers association considered whether to admit him as a member despite his ineligibility under existing rules, at least one member objected, prompting a formal vote. The measure passed by an overwhelming margin. China Joe is buried in the Pioneer section of Evergreen Cemetery in Juneau.

=== Emblem ===
The official emblem of the Pioneers of Alaska is a circular gold button, whose most prominent feature is a pair of crossed snowshoes, representing "one of the means of travel in the North so familiar to the Pioneers." Behind the snowshoes is the North Star, said to shine "more brightly in Alaska than anywhere else," and beneath it lies a low mountain range at the base of which is the sea, depicting Alaska's geography. The Aurora Borealis, frequently seen in Alaska, is also included behind the snowshoes.

The emblem collectively represents Alaska and the Pioneers themselves, with the snowshoes symbolizing the members, the North Star and Aurora Borealis reflecting the beauty of the heavens, and the mountains and sea illustrating the landscape. It has been described as "carefully colored and beautifully composed," and serves as a distinctive symbol of the Pioneers of Alaska.

== See also ==
- Alaska Native Brotherhood
- Sons of Norway
