= List of U.S. state statutory codes =

This is an incomplete list of statutory codes from the U.S. states, territories, and the one federal district.

Most states use a single official code divided into numbered titles. Pennsylvania's official codification is still in progress.

California, New York, and Texas use separate subject-specific codes (or in New York's case, "Consolidated Laws") which must be separately cited by name. Louisiana has both five subject-specific codes and a set of Revised Statutes divided into numbered titles. The Maryland Code was formerly divided into numbered titles, but was recodified into subject-specific articles which must be cited by name.

State or federal district	Statutory code(s)	Date adopted	Notes	External link
Alabama	Code of Alabama	1975		Code of Alabama
Alaska	Alaska Statutes	1962		Alaska Statutes
Arizona	Arizona Revised Statutes	January 9, 1956		Arizona Revised Statutes
Arkansas	Arkansas Code	1987		Arkansas Code
California	California Codes	Various	The state of California has 29 statutory codes.	California Law
Colorado	Colorado Revised Statutes			Colorado Revised Statutes
Connecticut	Connecticut General Statutes	1958	From the Code of 1650 to the Revision of 1958 (revised to January 1, 2017), 16 complete revisions have been done. From 1918 to 1972, revision updates were carried out by means of supplements.	General Statutes of Connecticut
Delaware	Delaware Code	1953		Delaware Code
District of Columbia	Code of the District of Columbia		Originally published in 1857 by A. O. P. Nicholson, Public Printer, as The Revised Code of the District of Columbia, prepared under the Authority of the Act of Congress, entitled "An act to improve the laws of the District of Columbia, and to codify the same," approved March 3, 1855.	District of Columbia Official Code
Florida	Florida Statutes			Florida Statutes
Georgia	Official Code of Georgia Annotated			Georgia Code
Hawaii	Hawaii Revised Statutes			Hawaii Revised Statutes
Idaho	Idaho Statutes			Idaho Statutes
Illinois	Illinois Compiled Statutes	January 1, 1993	ILCS; replaced Illinois Revised Statutes (Ill.Rev.Stat.) of 1874	Illinois Compiled Statutes (Background)
Indiana	Indiana Code			Indiana Code
Iowa	Code of Iowa			Merged Iowa Code and Supplement
Kansas	Kansas Statutes			Kansas Statutes
Kentucky	Kentucky Revised Statutes			Kentucky Revised Statutes
Louisiana	Louisiana Revised Statutes			Louisiana Revised Statutes
Maine	Maine Revised Statutes			Maine Revised Statutes
Maryland	Maryland Code	In stages from 1973 to 2016	Gradually replaced the 1957 code	Maryland Code
Massachusetts	General Laws of Massachusetts	1920	Replaced the "General Statutes" in 1920; currently updated via session laws referred to as chapters within yearly acts (i.e., Chapter 75 of the Acts of 1986).	Massachusetts General Laws
Michigan	Michigan Compiled Laws			Michigan Compiled Laws
Minnesota	Minnesota Statutes			Minnesota Statutes
Mississippi	Mississippi Unannotated Code			Mississippi Unannotated Code
Missouri	Missouri Revised Statutes			Missouri Revised Statutes
Montana	Montana Code Annotated			Montana Code Annotated
Nebraska	Nebraska Revised Statues			Nebraska Revised Statutes
Nevada	Nevada Revised Statutes			Nevada Revised Statutes
New Hampshire	State of New Hampshire Revised Statutes			State of New Hampshire Revised Statutes
New Jersey	New Jersey Statutes			New Jersey Statutes Annotated
New Mexico	New Mexico Statutes Annotated	1978	The New Mexico Compilation Commission publishes and distributes the official laws of the State of New Mexico. The 1978 NMSA is the tenth codification, revision or compilation of the laws of New Mexico since the "Kearny Code of Laws" of 1846.	Current New Mexico Statutes Annotated 1978
New York	Consolidated Laws of New York	1909		Consolidated Laws of New York
North Carolina	North Carolina General Statutes			North Carolina General Statutes
North Dakota	North Dakota Century Code			North Dakota Century Code
Ohio	Ohio Revised Code			Ohio Revised Code
Oklahoma	Oklahoma Statutes			Oklahoma Statutes
Oregon	Oregon Revised Statutes			Oregon Revised Statutes
Pennsylvania	Pennsylvania Consolidated Statutes	1970–present	Before 1970, there was no official codification of Pennsylvania's statutes; the proprietary codification by Purdon was a de facto standard. As the official code is incomplete, the Purdon code is still in use for some topics.	Pennsylvania Consolidated Statutes
Puerto Rico	Leyes de Puerto Rico			
Rhode Island	Rhode Island General Laws			Rhode Island General Laws
South Carolina	South Carolina Code of Laws			South Carolina Code of Laws
South Dakota	South Dakota Codified Laws			
Tennessee	Tennessee Code Annotated			
Texas	Revised Civil Statutes, Penal Code, and Code of Criminal Procedure			Texas Constitution & Statutes
Utah	Utah Code			Utah Code
Virgin Islands	Virgin Islands Code			
Vermont	Vermont Statutes Annotated			Vermont Statutes Online
Virginia	Code of Virginia	1950		Code of Virginia
Washington	Revised Code of Washington			Revised Code of Washington
West Virginia	West Virginia Code			West Virginia Code
Wisconsin	Wisconsin Statutes & Annotations			Wisconsin Statutes & Annotations
Wyoming	Wyoming Statutes			Wyoming Code

== See also ==
- United States Code, the codified statutes of the United States government
- Code of Federal Regulations, the codified regulations of the United States government
