= Pope in the White House =

American conspiracy theory

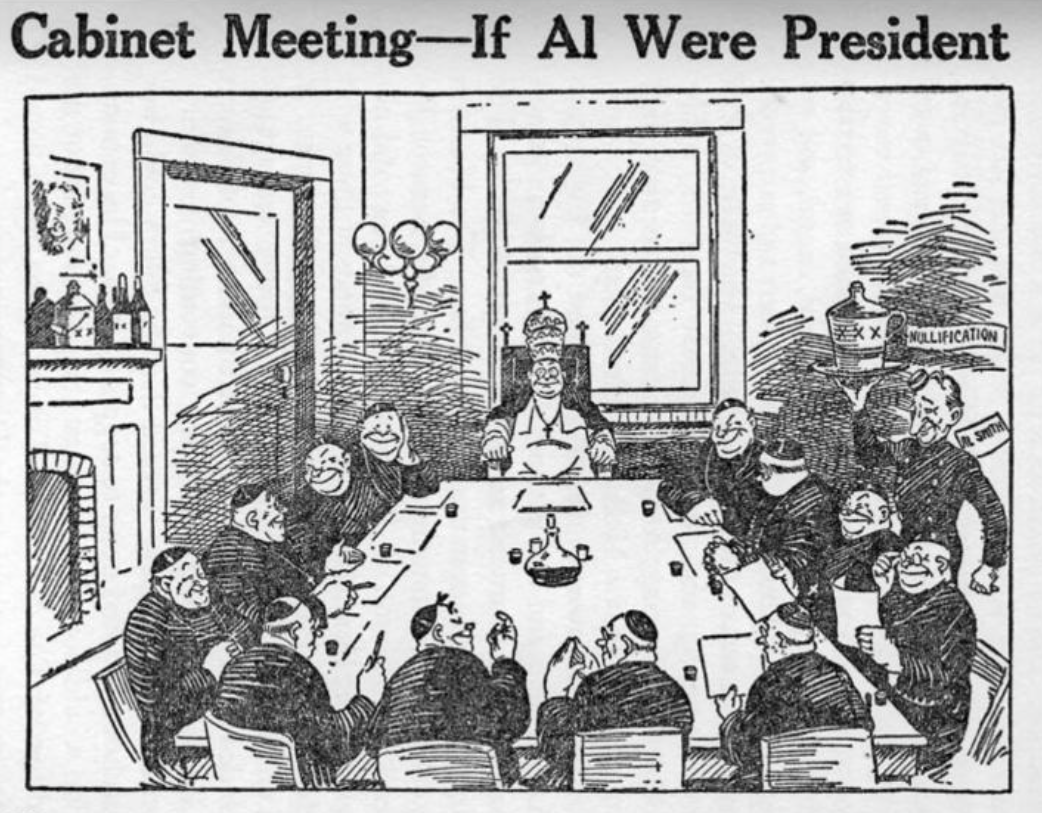
A political cartoon in the Klan-allied Fellowship Forum mocking presidential candidate Al Smith's Catholicism, depicting the Pope as an éminence grise after a potential Smith victory

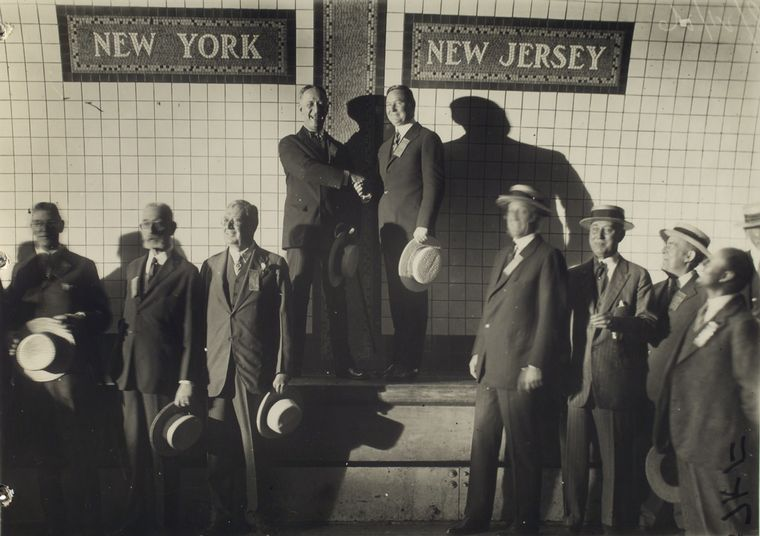
Governor Al Smith of New York (center left) at the opening of the Holland Tunnel. A photograph like this, mislabeled to imply a tunnel to the Vatican, was said to have been circulated in the 1928 presidential election.

The Pope in the White House conspiracy theory was an American anti-Catholic fringe belief amid the Romanism panic of the late 19th and early 20th centuries. It originated in the real historical circumstance that the "Prisoner in the Vatican", having lost temporal power in Rome after 1870, was briefly considering relocation to find sanctuary in another European city, but instead the conspiracy theory posited a plan for a Washington Papacy that would assert a nefarious influence over the whole United States. In the nativist surge after World War I, variations of this belief were expressed by sitting governor of Florida Sidney Johnston Catts, who claimed an attempted Vatican takeover of San Antonio, Florida; by Klan leaders in El Paso, Texas, around a contested election; and by the Indiana Klan in fears of a "million-dollar palace" in D.C., citing as evidence a photograph of the Episcopalian-built Washington National Cathedral.

A Ku Klux Klan-led national smear campaign in the 1928 presidential election used this concept to target Governor Al Smith of New York, the Democratic nominee and first major Catholic candidate. The most extreme rumor said to have been circulated, much ridiculed at the time and since, was that a secret passage, perhaps even a transatlantic tunnel, was being dug to bring the Pope over. There were later reports of this claim being spread by printed cards with a mislabeled photograph of Smith at the opening of the Holland Tunnel.

After Smith lost the election, a popular joke said that he sent a one-word telegram to Pope Pius XI to "Unpack". Unrelatedly, the Pope's status in Rome was solidified the following year with the Lateran Treaty. But the idea lingered in the American imagination, and was the subject of much commentary during the 1960 presidential campaign of John F. Kennedy and election as the first Catholic president. Kennedy himself had referenced the myth at the 1958 Gridiron Dinner, jokingly promising to appoint Methodist bishop Garfield Bromley Oxnam as "personal envoy to the Vatican and have him immediately begin negotiations for a transatlantic tunnel".

During the 1960 election, Kennedy's pollster Louis Harris asked specifically about the tunnel question in the West Virginia race, and with large numbers of voters finding it and other anti-Catholic canards credible, Kennedy was prompted to address the religion issue more directly. A January 1960 poll by Harris found 19 percent of likely voters in West Virginia regarded Kennedy's Catholicism as a negative. After Kennedy addressed his religion publicly, Harris reinterviewed a number of voters and "found many now intended to vote for Kennedy to show that West Virginians were not bigots".

The historical comparison was raised again in the 2008 election due to religion conspiracy theories concerning Barack Obama.

== See also ==
- List of meetings between the pope and the president of the United States
- Passetto di Borgo – Papal bridge in Rome
- Religious affiliations of presidents of the United States
