= Alaska Equal Rights Act of 1945 =

First anti-discrimination state law in the U.S.

In the history of discrimination in the United States, the Alaska Equal Rights Act of 1945 (also known as the Anti-Discrimination Law of 1945 Alaska Statutes 44.12.065) was the first state or territorial anti-discrimination law enacted in the United States in the 20th century. The law, signed on February 16, 1945, prevents and criminalizes discrimination against individuals in public areas based on race. The law came about after Alaska Natives fought against segregation and other forms of discrimination in Alaska.

== Background ==
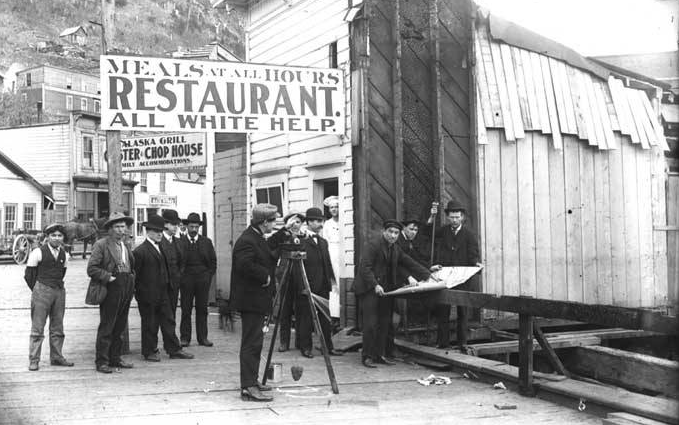
Discrimination in a restaurant in Juneau in 1908: "All White Help."

Prior to 1945 Alaska Natives were subject to segregation and disenfranchisement. The Nelson Act of 1905 created two separate educational systems. In 1908, a child of white and Alaska Native heritage was denied entrance to the Sitka, Alaska public school. In Ketchikan, Alaska attorney, William Paul (Tlingit), won a case allowing children of mixed heritage to attend public school. Despite this win, there were still continued restrictions against Alaska Natives. Public areas like swimming pools, theaters and playgrounds in Alaska were also segregated. Alaska Natives were often forced to abandon their culture.

Members of the Alaska Native Brotherhood (ANB) staged boycotts of places that segregated whites and Alaska Natives. ANB was successful in some areas of the territory, but many places of business continued to exclude Alaska Natives. Elizabeth Peratrovich (Tlingit), who was vice president of the Alaska Native Sisterhood (ANS), and her husband Roy Peratrovich (Tlingit), president of ANB, wrote to Ernest Gruening, the governor of Alaska, in 1941 and argued that segregation was "very Un-American."

Governor Gruening was already upset by the obvious discrimination in the territory. Gruening used his influence to stop segregation in some communities and with individuals he knew. In 1942, Gruening spoke to the Director of the Division of Territories and Island Possessions about preparing an anti-discrimination bill. Gruening's bill was given to the Territorial Legislature in 1943, but this version of the bill did not pass.

In 1944, Alberta Schenck (Inupiaq) protested segregation in a Nome, Alaska movie theater. Schenck sat in a "whites only" section of the theater until the police removed her. Schenck spent the night in jail and the next day, telegraphed Governor Gruening about her experience. Many residents of Nome were infuriated by Schenck's treatment but the theater continued to segregate. Between 1943 and 1945, Elizabeth Peratrovich and her husband Roy Peratrovich tirelessly lobbied the Alaska's legislators and worked with Governor Gruening to increase support for the new bill.

== Legislative history ==
The anti-discrimination bill was introduced in the House of the Territorial Legislature by Representative Edward Anderson in 1945. Anderson was also the mayor of Nome, Alaska and was upset that Alberta Schenck had been arrested for protesting discrimination in a segregated movie theater. The Senate version was introduced by Schenck's lawyer, Senator O. D. Cochran.

Representing the Alaska Native Brotherhood and the Alaska Native Sisterhood, ANB and ANS Grand Presidents Roy and Elizabeth Peratrovich offered their testimony. Roy Peratrovich (Tlingit) argued that discrimination came from "unscrupulous white men" and that it was "a disgrace to the Democratic form of Government." However, the testimony that has largely been considered decisive in passing the bill came from Elizabeth Peratrovich (Tlingit), who spoke for two hours.

In response to territorial senator Allen Shattuck of Juneau, who had earlier asked "Who are these people, barely out of savagery, who want to associate with us whites, with 5,000 years of recorded civilization behind us?," she stated:

I would not have expected that I, who am barely out of savagery, would have to remind gentlemen with five thousand years of recorded civilization behind them, of our Bill of Rights.

The Daily Alaska Empire printed that her testimony "shamed the opposition into a 'defensive whisper.'"

The bill was signed by Governor Gruening into law on February 16, 1945. Alaska thus became the first territory or state to end "Jim Crow" since 18 states banned discrimination in public accommodations in the three decades following the Civil War; not until 1955 would two more states, New Mexico and Montana, follow suit.

== Provisions ==
All Alaskans shall be entitled to "full and equal enjoyment" of public areas and businesses. Discriminatory actions in the state of Alaska are made punishable by a $250 fine and up to 30 days in jail. Signs designed to discriminate based on race are banned.

== Impact ==
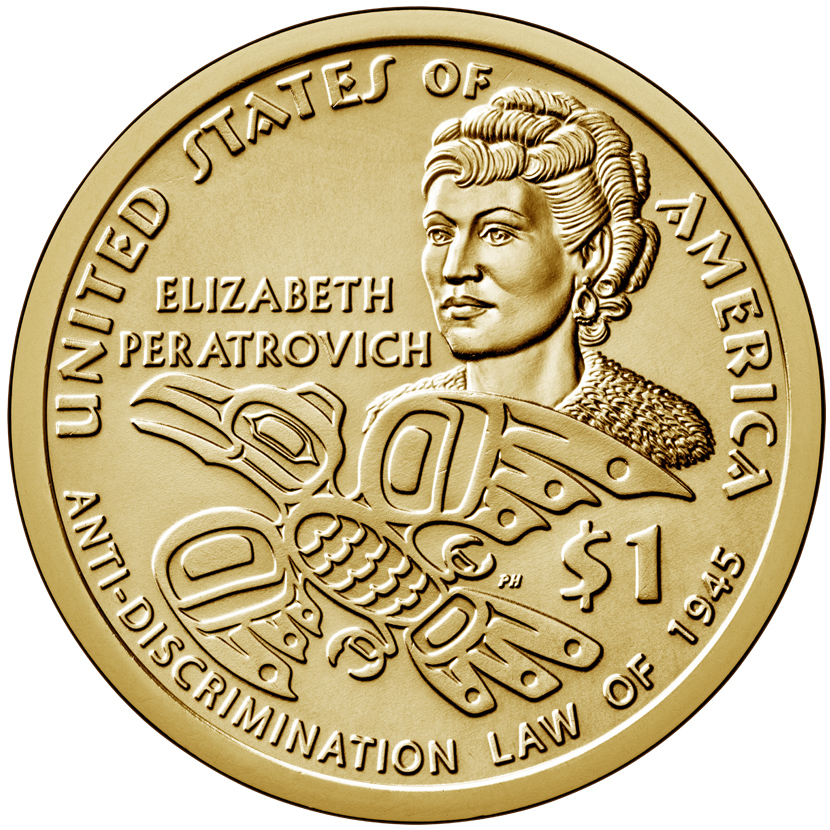
2020 Native American Dollar Reverse with Elizabeth Peratrovich (Tlingit).

The Alaska Equal Rights Act was the first anti-discrimination law passed in the United States. The passage of the law abolished Jim Crow laws in Alaska.

The United States Mint commemorated the passage of the law and Elizabeth Peratrovich on the one-dollar coin in 2020. The coin, which marked the first time an Alaska Native was featured on currency of the U.S., was made available online.
