= Elizabeth Peratrovich =

Native-American civil rights activist (1911–1958)

- Ḵaax̲gal.aat
- Born: Ḵaax̲gal.aat; July 4, 1911; Petersburg, District of Alaska, U.S.
- Died: December 1, 1958 (aged 47); Seattle, Washington, U.S.
- Other name: Elizabeth Jean Wanamaker
- Education: Sheldon Jackson College; Western College of Education
- Organization: Alaska Native Sisterhood
- Known for: Civil-rights activism; Native-American rights
- Spouse: Roy Peratrovich (m. 1931)
- Children: 3

Elizabeth Peratrovich (née Elizabeth Jean Wanamaker; Tlingit: Ḵaax̲gal.aat [qʰaχ.ɡʌɬ.ʔatʰ]; July 4, 1911 – December 1, 1958) was an American civil rights activist, Grand President of the Alaska Native Sisterhood, and a Tlingit who worked for equality on behalf of Alaska Natives. In the 1940s, her advocacy was credited as being instrumental in the passing of Alaska's Anti-Discrimination Act of 1945, the first state or territorial anti-discrimination law enacted in the United States.

In 1988, Alaska Governor Steve Cowper established April 21 as Elizabeth Peratrovich Day "for her courageous, unceasing efforts to eliminate discrimination and bring about equal rights in Alaska. The date was later changed to February 16 in observance of the day in 1945 on which the Anti-Discrimination Act was approved. In March 2019, her obituary was added to The New York Times as part of their "Overlooked No More" series, and in 2020, the United States Mint released a $1 coin inscribed with Peratrovich's likeness in honor of her historic achievements. The Peratrovich family papers, including correspondence, personal papers, and news clippings related to the civil-rights work done by Peratrovich and her husband, are currently held at the Smithsonian National Museum of the American Indian.

== Personal life ==
=== Early life and education ===
Elizabeth Wanamaker was born on July 4, 1911, in Petersburg, Alaska, as a member of the Lukaax̱.ádi clan in the Raven moiety of the Tlingit nation and with the Tlingit name of Ḵaax̲gal.aat ("person who packs for themselves").

She was orphaned at a young age and adopted by Andrew and Jean Wanamaker (née Williams), who gave her the name Elizabeth Jean. Andrew was a fisherman and Presbyterian lay minister. The Wanamakers raised Elizabeth in Petersburg, Klawock, and Ketchikan, Alaska. Wanamaker graduated from Ketchikan High School, and then attended Sheldon Jackson College in Sitka, and the Western College of Education in Bellingham, Washington (now part of Western Washington University). (Note: Link to 1930 census of Klawock showing the Wanamaker household starting on line 18.)

=== Later life ===
On December 15, 1931, Elizabeth Wanamaker married Roy Scott Peratrovich (1908–1989), also a Tlingit, of mixed Native and Serb descent, who worked in a cannery. They had three children: daughter Loretta Montgomery (c. 1942) and sons Roy Jr. (c. 1934) and Frank (c. 1938). The family lived in Klawock, where Roy was elected to four terms as village mayor. Elizabeth Peratrovich was a member of the Presbyterian Church.

The Peratroviches were concerned about racial discrimination and inequities. Looking for greater access to lawmakers who could effect change, they moved to Juneau, and even there found extensive social and racial discrimination against Alaska Native people. The Peratrovichs were one of the first Indigenous families in Juneau to live in a non-Native neighborhood, and Roy Jr. was one of the first Indigenous children to attend public schools there.

The Peratrovich family later moved to Antigonish, Nova Scotia, Canada, where Roy studied the fishing industry at St. Francis Xavier University, the first Alaskan to do so on a United Nations fellowship. Later, they moved to Denver, Colorado, where Roy studied banking and finance at the University of Denver and credit procedure at the Central Bank and Trust Company in Denver. In the 1950s, the Peratrovichs moved to Oklahoma, when Roy took up a position with the federal government, and they moved back to Alaska when Elizabeth fell ill.

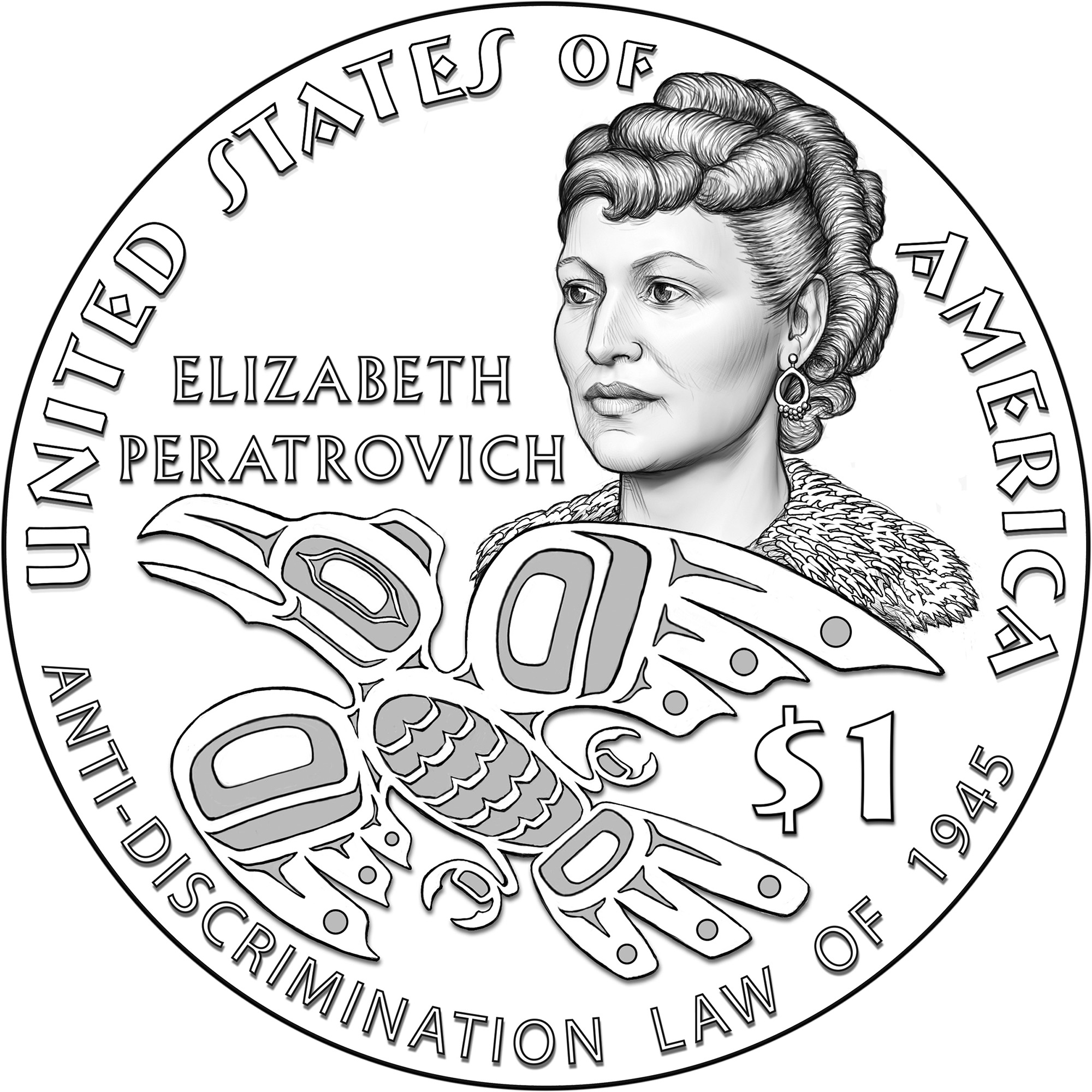
2020 Native American $1 coin

Elizabeth Peratrovich died of breast cancer, on December 1, 1958, at the age of 47. She is buried at Evergreen Cemetery in Juneau, Alaska, alongside her husband Roy who died in 1989. The eldest son, Roy Jr.—a partner in the engineering firm of Peratrovich, Nottingham and Drage—became a civil engineer in Alaska and designed the Brotherhood Bridge in Juneau, which carries the Glacier Highway over the Mendenhall River. Besides being an engineer Roy Peratrovich Jr. is also a Native artist. Her younger son, Frank, worked as the Area Tribal Operations Officer for the Bureau of Indian Affairs in Juneau.

== Activism ==
In 1941, while living in Juneau, Alaska, Elizabeth and Roy Peratrovich encountered discrimination in their attempts to secure housing and gain access to public facilities. They petitioned the territorial governor, Ernest Gruening, to prohibit public places from posting signs such as "No Natives Allowed," "We cater to white trade only," "No Dogs, No Natives,"... that were common in Alaska during this time.

With the help of others, Elizabeth and Roy Peratrovich drafted and introduced an anti-discrimination bill in 1941, though it failed to pass. Nevertheless, they persevered: as high-ranking representatives of the Alaska Native Brotherhood and the Alaska Native Sisterhood, the Peratrovichs used their unique position to bring attention to the issue of discrimination and to lobby Alaska lawmakers, the governor, and others to advocate for the passage of anti-discrimination legislation. In one instance, according to their granddaughter, Betsy Peratrovich, they decided to invite a legislator to join them for coffee, taking the opportunity to plead their case.

When the invitation was accepted, they took the small amount of spare change they had and brought it to the meeting—worrying the whole time that they wouldn't have enough to pay if anything other than coffee was ordered. Thankfully, not only did they have just enough money to pay for the beverages, but the meeting was productive! There were many grassroots efforts in those days, including efforts by countless other Alaska Native people who took steps to overcome and raise awareness of widespread inequities and instances of blatant prejudice.

In 1945, representing the Alaska Native Brotherhood/Sisterhood, they again brought an anti-discrimination bill before the Alaska Senate. Last to testify, Elizabeth Peratrovich took to the floor to deliver an impassioned speech, calling for equal treatment for Indigenous peoples. In reaction to the bill, Juneau territorial senator Allen Shattuck asked, "Who are these people, barely out of savagery, who want to associate with us whites, with 5,000 years of recorded civilization behind us?" Elizabeth Peratrovich responded:

I would not have expected that I, who am barely out of savagery, would have to remind gentlemen with five thousand years of recorded civilization behind them, of our Bill of Rights.

The Senate voted 11–5 for House Resolution 14, providing "full and equal accommodations, facilities, and privileges to all citizens in places of public accommodations within the jurisdiction of the Territory of Alaska; to provide penalties for violation". The bill was signed into law by Governor Gruening in 1945, nearly 20 years before the US Congress passed the Civil Rights Act of 1964. Acts of the territorial legislature required final approval from the U.S. Congress, which affirmed it (Bob Bartlett, Alaskan delegate, was known for his efficiency in passing legislation). Alaska thus became the first territory or state to end "Jim Crow" since 18 states banned discrimination in public accommodations in the three decades following the Civil War; not until 1955 would two more states, New Mexico and Montana, follow suit. Peratrovich's testimony has been widely credited as a decisive factor in the passage of the historic Anti-Discrimination Act of 1945. In 1992, Fran Ulmer, who represented Juneau in the Alaska House of Representatives (and who later became lieutenant governor of Alaska), said the following about Peratrovich's testimony:

She talked about herself, her friends, her children, and the cruel treatment that consigned Alaska Natives to a second-class existence. She described to the Senate what it means to be unable to buy a house in a decent neighborhood because Natives aren't allowed to live there. She described how children feel when they are refused entrance into movie theaters, or see signs in shop windows that read "No dogs or Natives allowed."

The Peratrovich family papers, including correspondence, personal papers, and news clippings related to the civil rights work done by Elizabeth and Roy Peratrovich, are currently held at the Smithsonian National Museum of the American Indian. In 1988, the Alaska State Legislature declared February 16 as "Elizabeth Peratrovich Day".

== Legacy and honors ==
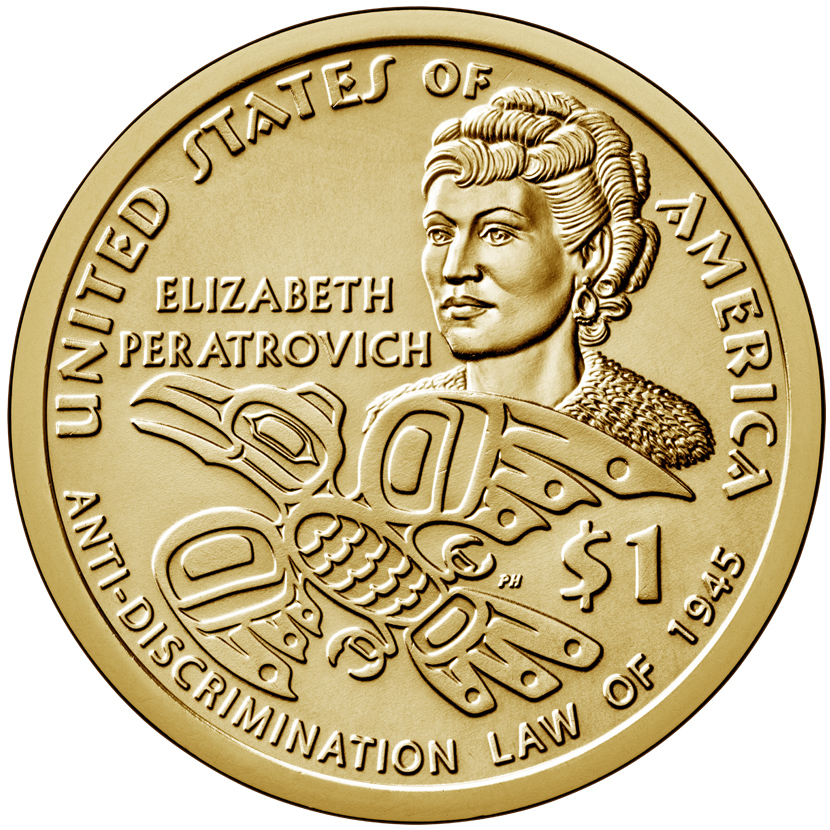
2020 Native American $1 coin

- In April, 1988, Alaska Governor Steve Cowper established April 21 as Elizabeth Peratrovich Day "for her courageous, unceasing efforts to eliminate discrimination and bring about equal rights in Alaska." The date was later changed to February 16 in observance of the day in 1945 on which the Anti-Discrimination Act was approved (Alaska Statutes 44.12.065).
- The Elizabeth Peratrovich Award was established in her honor by the Alaska Native Sisterhood.
- In 1992, Gallery B of the Alaska House of Representatives chamber in the Alaska State Capitol was renamed in her honor. Of the four galleries located in the respective two chambers, the Peratrovich Gallery is the only one named for someone other than a former legislator (the other House gallery was named for Warren A. Taylor; the Senate galleries were named for former senators Cliff Groh and Robert H. Ziegler).
- In 2003, a park in downtown Anchorage was named for Elizabeth and Roy Peratrovich. It encompasses the lawn surrounding Anchorage's former city hall, with a small amphitheater in which concerts and other performances are held.
- In 2009, For the Rights of All: Ending Jim Crow in Alaska, a documentary about Peratrovich's groundbreaking civil rights advocacy, premiered on October 22 at the Alaska Federation of Natives convention in Anchorage. The film, scheduled to air as a PBS documentary film in November 2009, was produced by Blueberry Productions, Inc. and was primarily written by Jeffry Lloyd Silverman of Anchorage.
- In 2017, the theater in Ketchikan's Southeast Alaska Discovery Center was named in honor of Elizabeth Peratrovich, and a companion exhibit exploring her role in the struggle for Alaska Native civil rights was unveiled.
- In 2018, Elizabeth Peratrovich was chosen by the National Women's History Project as one of its honorees for Women's History Month in the United States.
- In March 2019, her obituary was added to The New York Times as part of their "Overlooked No More" series.
- On October 5, 2019, United States Mint Chief Administrative Officer Patrick Hernandez announced that Peratrovich would appear on the reverse of the 2020 Native American $1 Coin, making her the first Alaska Native to be featured on U.S. currency.
- In December 2019, a 4-story apartment building called Elizabeth Place, named after Peratrovich, opened in downtown Anchorage.
- In January 2020, Peratrovich was selected as one of the 20for2020 highlighting extraordinary accomplishments by women.
- In July 2020, a new mural was unveiled in honor of Peratrovich in Petersburg.
- On December 30, 2020, a Google Doodle in the United States and Canada honored Elizabeth Peratrovich. The Doodle was drawn by Tlingit artist Michaela Goade. This day was chosen because it was on this date in 1941 when the Peratroviches, after seeing a "No Natives Allowed" sign, decided to submit the petition to the governor.
- In September 2021 a mural of Peratrovich created by Tlingit artist, Crystal Worl was installed on the exterior of the Juneau Public Library/Marine Park Garage in Juneau, Alaska.
- In early November 2021 the PBS Kids' animated educational series Molly of Denali aired an episode called Molly & Elizabeth that depicts the primary characters in the series, Molly Mabray and Tooey Ookami, remembering the legacy of Peratrovitch.

== See also ==
- List of civil rights leaders
- Alberta Schenck Adams
- Alaska Equal Rights Act of 1945
- Native American women in politics
