= Brotherhood Bridge =

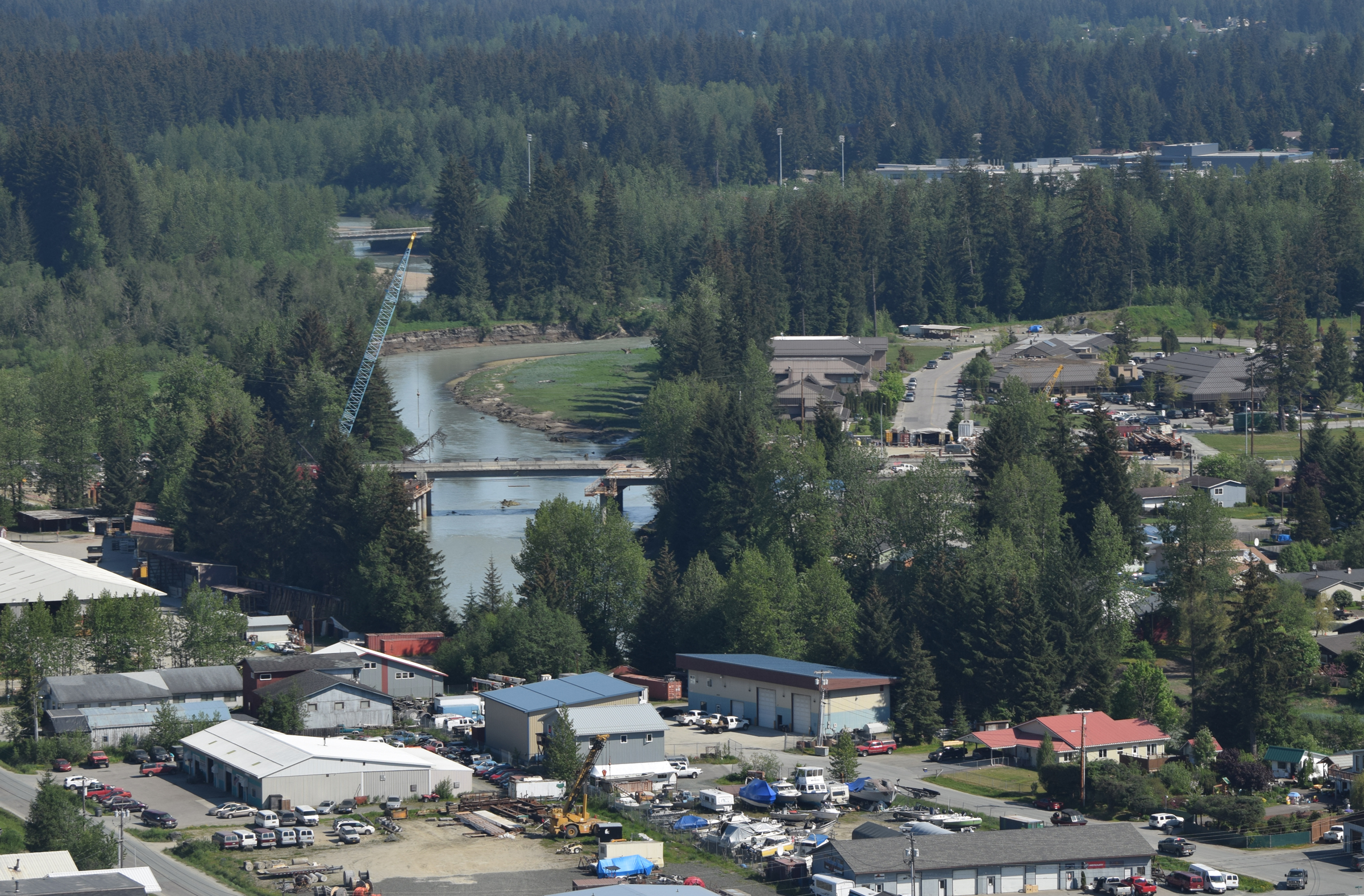
- Aerial view of construction of the four-lane replacement bridge in May 2015, looking upriver from above the area along Industrial Boulevard, which abuts the bridge to the southwest.
- Coordinates: 58°22′13″N 134°36′06″W
- Carries: Glacier Highway
- Crosses: Mendenhall River
- Locale: Juneau, Alaska, USA
- Named for: Alaska Native Brotherhood
- Owner: Alaska DOT&PF

History
- Designer: Roy Peratrovich, Jr.
- Opened: 1965 (original); 2015 (current)
- Replaces: Previous bridges

Location
- Interactive map of Brotherhood Bridge

The Brotherhood Bridge is a road bridge in Juneau, Alaska. The bridge carries the Glacier Highway over the Mendenhall River, acting as a demarcation point of sorts between the urban and rural portions of mainland Juneau. The bridge was named in honor of the Alaska Native Brotherhood (ANB). It was designed by civil engineer Roy Peratrovich, Jr., the son of Roy and Elizabeth Peratrovich, who were leaders in the ANB and counterpart Alaska Native Sisterhood. Bronze plaques on the bridge refer to the Raven and Eagle clans of the Tlingit people. Previous bridges across the Mendenhall River, at or near the same spot, were constructed in 1903, 1919 and 1931. It was entered into the United States Geological Survey's Geographic Names Information System on March 31, 1981.

The Brotherhood Bridge was slated for replacement, with widening and other improvements, in 2012. Demolition of the old bridge and construction of a new 99.5-foot-wide bridge happened concurrently in stages, beginning April 25, 2014, and completing October 31, 2015.

The name Brotherhood Bridge was appropriated by a band consisting of Juneau-area musicians.
