= Charles Carter (Alaska politician) =

Canadian-born American mortician and politician

Charles W. Carter (1869–1961) was a Canadian-born mortician and politician in the U.S. territory of Alaska. He was born in 1869 in Otonabee Township, Peterborough County, Ontario, Canada, the son of James Julian Carter (of Irish descent) and Sarah Jane Fife (of Scottish descent). Carter's original name was Silas Whitfield Carter. He was in San Francisco, California, when news of the Klondike gold strike arrived, and he headed north to Skagway, Alaska in 1897. He settled in Juneau, Alaska, in 1899. He was a citizen of Alaska by 1901. He married Alphonsine Cecilia Lovely in Juneau in 1902. Carter served as the eighth mayor of Juneau, Alaska, from 1913 to 1914. In 1947, along with Henry Roden and David Gross, he persuaded the Alaska Territorial Legislature to rename the Pioneers Trust Fund, a regional fund for elderly citizens, to the Pioneer Memorial Fund. Outside politics, he owned and operated a funeral home, the Charles W. Carter Mortuary, which he founded in 1916.

Charles Charter is buried in Evergreen Cemetery, in Juneau. In 1950, Carter sold the mortuary business which continued to bear his name. The business was acquired by the Fairbanks-based Alaskan Memorial Parks, Inc. in 1964.
