= Cash Cole =

American politician and businessman (1891–1959)

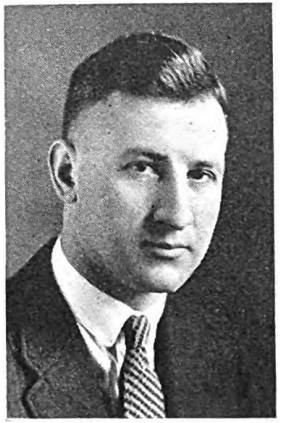
- Cole in 1923

5th Speaker of the Alaska Territorial House of Representatives
- In office March 5, 1923 – March 2, 1925
- Preceded by: Andrew Nerland
- Succeeded by: C. H. Wilcox

Member of the Alaska Territorial House of Representatives from the 1st district
- In office March 7, 1921 – March 2, 1925

Personal details
- Born: Clarence Cash Cole; February 12, 1891 Henderson Bay, Washington, U.S.
- Died: November 8, 1959 (aged 68) Bellingham, Washington, U.S.
- Party: Republican
- Spouse(s): Ruby C. Worth (m. 1915, divorced) Ruth Marcella (Marsh) Gudbrandon (m. 1945)
- Children: 3
- Education: University of Minnesota
- Occupation: Politician, businessman

Clarence Cash Cole (February 12, 1891 – November 8, 1959) was an American politician and businessman from Juneau, Alaska, who served in the Alaska Territorial House of Representatives from 1921 to 1925, representing the 1st electoral district as a Republican in the 5th and 6th territorial legislatures. He served as the fifth speaker of the Alaska Territorial House of Representatives from 1923 to 1925 in the 6th territorial legislature.

== Early life and education ==
Cole was born in Henderson Bay, Washington, on February 12, 1891. He moved to Treadwell with his parents when he was four years old. Cole was educated at public schools in Juneau, Alaska, and attended the University of Minnesota.

== Career ==
After college, Cole worked in the business sector in Juneau, engaging in draying, docking, and contracting. He was the president and general manager of the Cole Transfer Company.

Cole served two terms in the Alaska Territorial House of Representatives, representing the 1st electoral district from 1921 to 1925 as a Republican in the 5th and 6th territorial legislatures. He served one term as the fifth speaker of the Alaska Territorial House of Representatives from 1923 to 1925 in the 6th territorial legislature.

Outside of the Alaska Territorial Legislature, Cole worked as an agent for American Railway Express. He also served as Alaska's territorial auditor from 1929 to 1932. Additionally, Cole was a candidate for delegate to the United States Congress from the Territory of Alaska in 1940.

Cole won the popular vote on a referendum for governor of Alaska in 1923. Despite this, Republican George Alexander Parks was appointed territorial governor in 1924 through official federal channels.

== Personal life and death ==
Cole married Ruby C. Worth in Juneau on March 7, 1915. They had three children: James Cash Cole (born June 25, 1916), Thomas Phillip Cole (born June 23, 1917), and Jerry Worth Cole (born March 22, 1926).

Cole and Worth divorced prior to 1940. He remarried to Ruth Marcella (Marsh) Gudbranson on January 20, 1945.

Cole was a member of The Elks and the Pioneers of Alaska. He served as president of Juneau Men's Igloo 6 in 1938. In the 1920s, Cole served as Exalted Cyclops of Mt. Juneau Klavern No. 2, a local chapter of the Ku Klux Klan in Juneau.

Cole was a Presbyterian.

Cole died at the age of 68 in Bellingham, Washington, on November 8, 1959.

Alaska House of Representatives
Preceded by —	Member of the Alaska Territorial House of Representatives from the 1st district 1921–1925	Succeeded by —
Preceded by Andrew Nerland	Speaker of the Alaska Territorial House of Representatives; 1923–1925	Succeeded by C. H. Wilcox
