= Alaska Natives =

Indigenous people of Alaska, U.S.

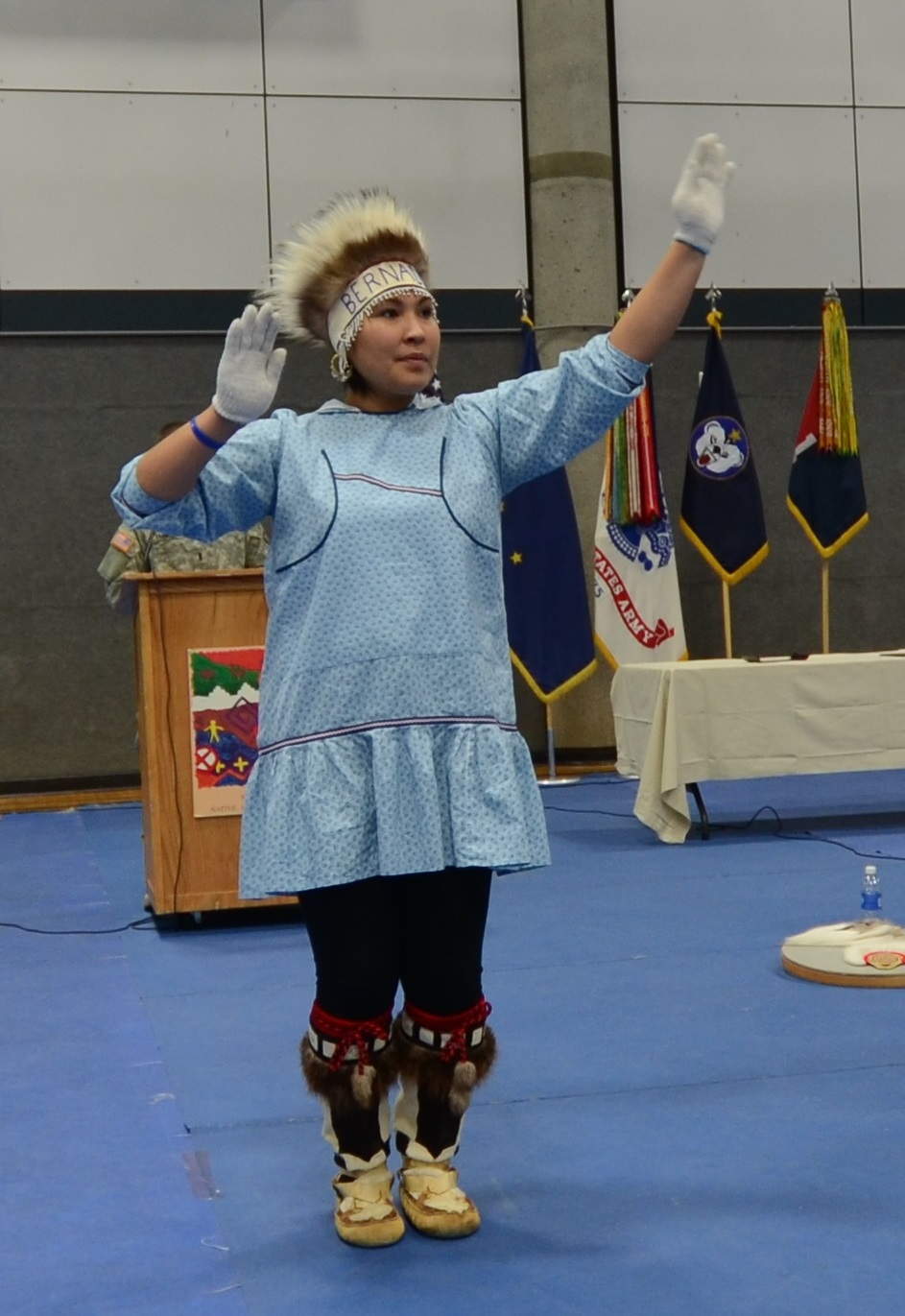
- Alaskan Yup'ik Native dancer performing in Fairbanks (2013)

Total population
- 168,826 (2010 census)

Regions with significant populations
- United States (Alaska)

Languages
- English, Alaskan Russian, Haida, Tsimshianic languages, Eskaleut languages (Inupiaq, Central Alaskan Yup'ik, Alutiiq, Aleut), Chinook Jargon, Na-Dené languages (Northern Athabaskan, Eyak, Tlingit), others

Religion
- Shamanism (largely ex); Alaska Native religion, Christianity (Protestantism, Eastern Orthodoxy, Roman Catholicism)

Related ethnic groups
- Alaskan Creoles, Native Americans, First Nations, Inuit

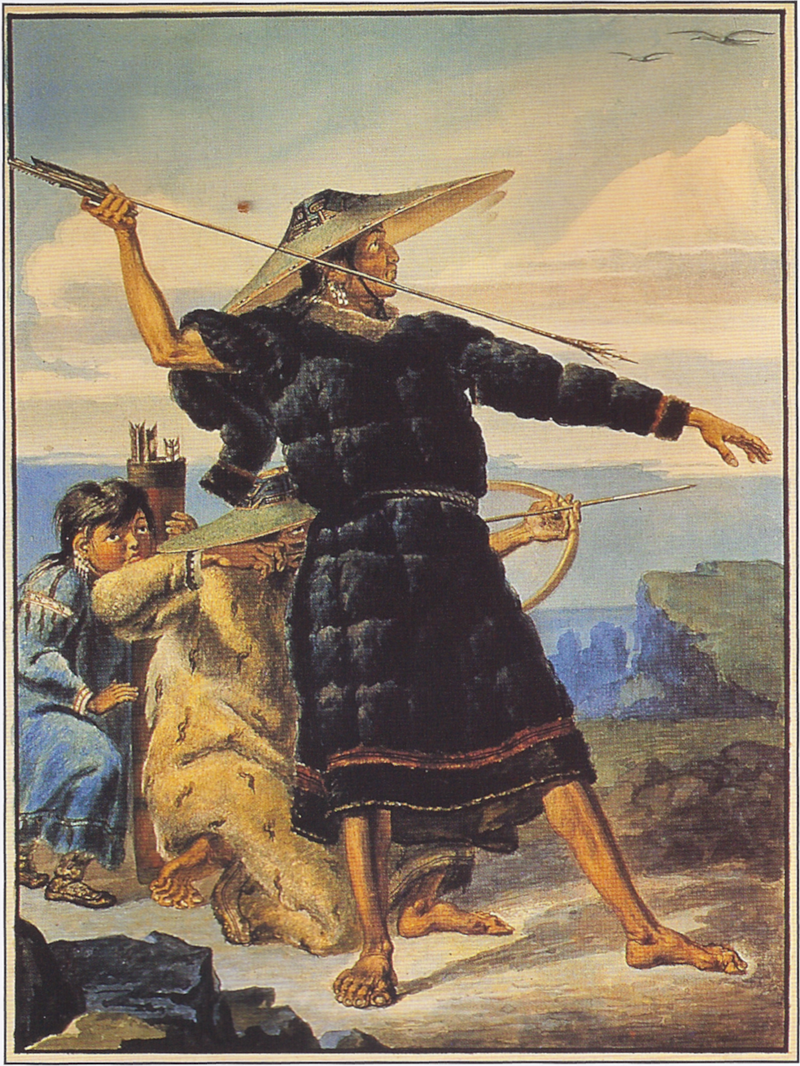
Aleut islander (19th Century)

Alaska Natives are the Indigenous peoples of the U.S. state of Alaska. They encompass diverse cultural and linguistic groups, including Iñupiat, Aleut, Yupik peoples, and American Indians such as the Eyak, Tlingit, Haida, Tsimshian, and various Northern Athabaskan. Most Alaska Natives are enrolled in federally recognized Alaska Native tribes, which are members of the 13 Alaska Native Regional Corporations responsible for managing land and financial claims.

The migration of Alaska Natives' ancestors into the Alaskan region occurred thousands of years ago in multiple waves. Some present-day groups descend from a later migration event whose descendants gradually settled across northern North America. The Alaska Native's ancestors are the ones who did not migrate further south or east. Genetic evidence indicates that these groups are not closely related to the Indigenous peoples of South America.

Evidence from archaeology indicates that the ancestors of Alaska Natives migrated from Asia. Anthropologists have proposed that their journey to Alaska from Asia was made possible through the Bering land bridge or by traveling across the sea. Across the Arctic and the circumpolar north, the ancestors of Alaska Natives established a variety of Indigenous cultures that developed and changed over time. These cultures demonstrated considerable ingenuity in adapting to harsh climates and environments.

Historically, the defining characteristic of Alaska Native groups has often been their languages, which belong to several major language families. Currently, Alaska Natives or Native Alaskans constitute more than 20% of Alaska's population.

== List of peoples ==
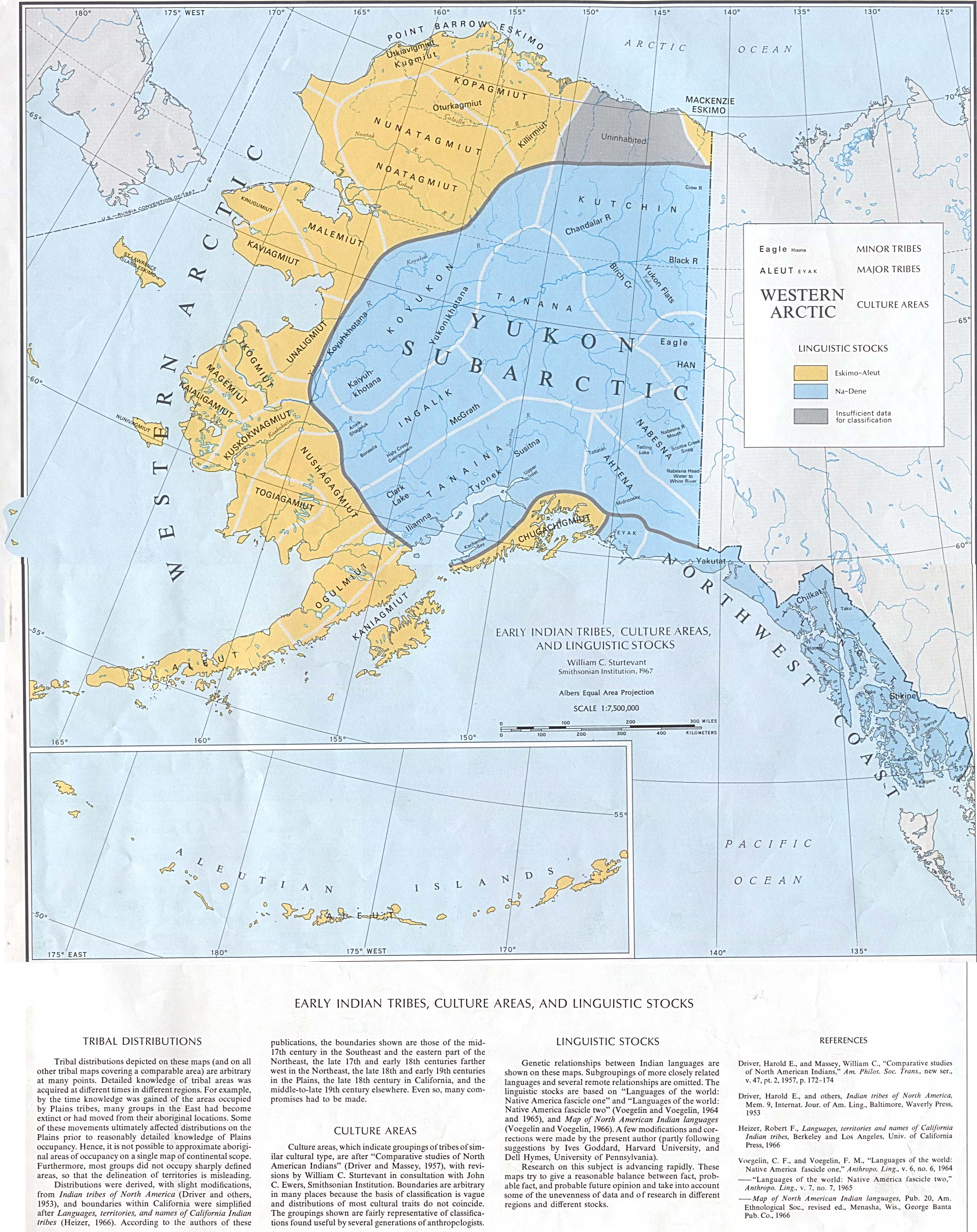
Alaska Native Languages

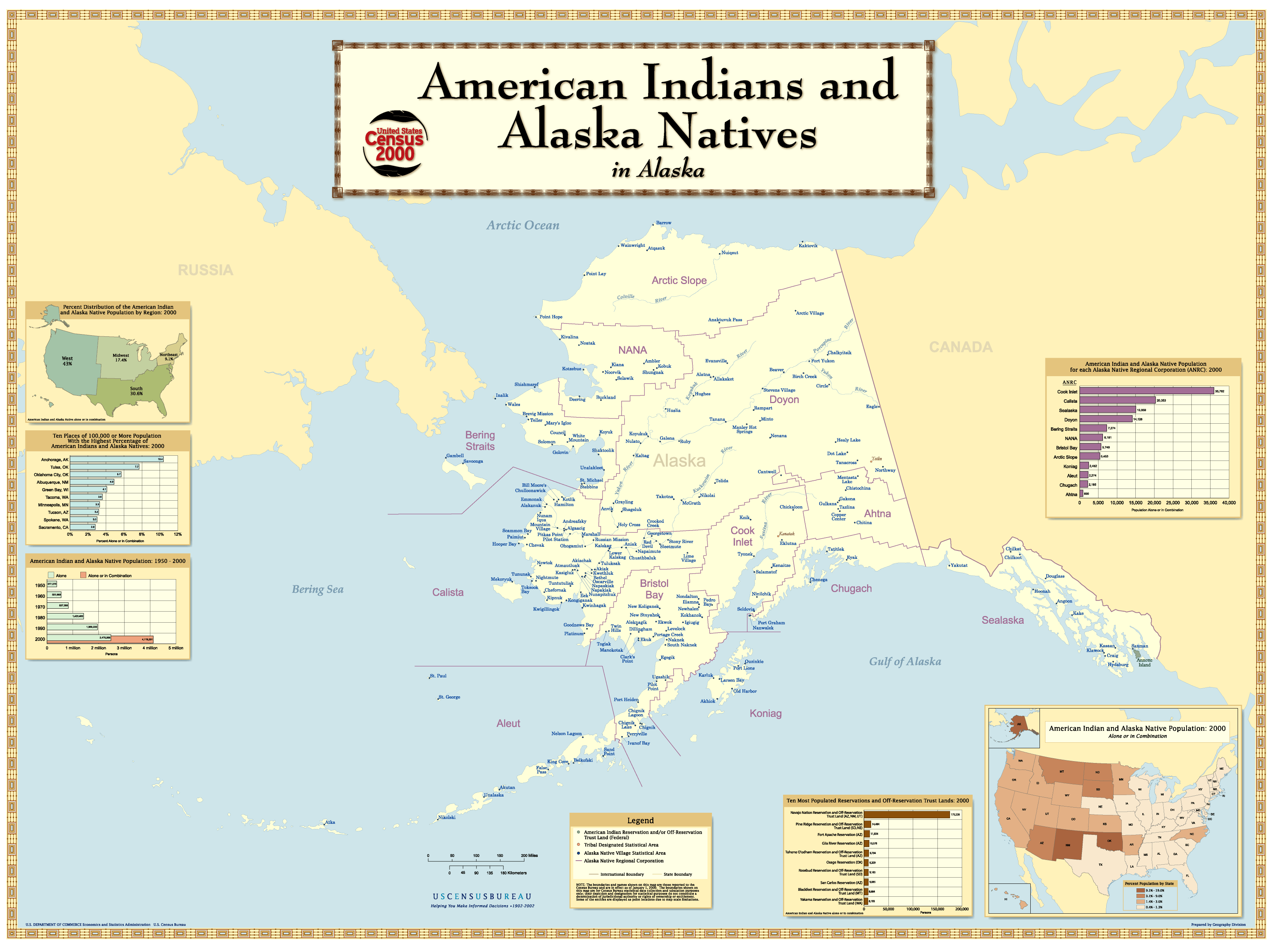
American Indians and Alaska Natives in Alaska

The vast majority of Alaska Natives are either Eskaleut or Na Dene. Below is a full list of the different Alaska Native or Native Alaskan peoples, who are largely defined by their historical languages (within each culture are different tribes):

- Alaskan Athabaskans
  - Ahtna
  - Deg Xitʼan
  - Denaʼina
  - Gwichʼin
  - Hän
  - Holikachuk
  - Koyukon
  - Tanana Athabaskans
    - Lower Tanana
    - Tanacross
    - Upper Tanana
  - Upper Kuskokwim (Kolchan)
- Aleut (Unangan)
- Ancient Beringian
- Eskimo
  - Iñupiat, an Inuit group
  - Yupik
    - Alutiiq (Sugpiaq)
      - Chugach Sugpiaq
      - Koniag Alutiiq
    - Cup'ik
    - Nunivak Cup'ig
    - Siberian Yupik (Yupiget)
    - Yup'ik
- Eyak
- Haida
- Tlingit
- Tsimshian

== Demographics ==
As of 2018, Alaska Natives constituted 15.4% of the overall Alaskan population. Earlier data from the Alaskan Natives Commission estimated approximately 86,000 Alaska Natives residing in Alaska in 1990, with an additional 17,000 living outside of the state. More recently, a 2013 study conducted by the Alaska Department of Labor and Workforce Development documented over 120,000 Alaska Native Individuals within Alaska. While a significant portion of the Alaska Native populations resides in smaller villages or remote regional hubs such as Nome, Dillingham, and Bethel, there has been a notable increase in the percentage living in urban areas. According to the 2010 census, 44% of Alaska Natives lived in urban areas, a rise from 38% recorded in the 2000 census.

=== Population history ===
The pre-contact population of Alaska Natives, in year 1750, before first European settlement, is estimated as around 93,800 people. In 1870 the native population of Alaska was still estimated as 70,000 people. However, the census of 1880 found only 32,996 Native Alaskans. The population of Alaska Natives then further declined to 25,450 people in 1910 (of whom 25,328 lived in Alaska and 122 in the rest of the United States). Since 1910 the population began rebounding, and it reached 168,826 people in year 2010. Of them 124,758 lived in Alaska and 44,068 in the rest of the United States.

== History ==
The modern history of Alaska Natives began in the eighteenth century with the initial contact between Alaskan First Nations and Russian explorers sailing from Siberia. Subsequently, in the nineteenth century, British and American traders, coming mostly from eastern settlements in North America, arrived in the region. In some areas of Alaska, the active presence of Christian missionaries did not occur until the twentieth century.

=== Russian colonial period ===
Vitus Bering spotted Alaska during an expedition. Subsequently, in the 18th century, Alaska Natives encountered Russians, with the timing of this contact varying among different Native groups across Alaska. Arriving by ship from Siberia, in the mid-eighteenth century, Russians established trade with Alaska Natives, particularly in the Aleutian Islands. They founded settlements around their trading posts, which included Russian Orthodox missionaries. These missionaries were the first to translate Christian scripture into Native languages, such as Tlingit. The lasting impact of this period is evident in the 21st century with numerous Russian Orthodox Christian congregations in Alaska composed predominantly of Alaska Natives.

The Sibero-Russian promyshlenniki, rather than engaging in hunting and harvesting marine life themselves, coerced the Aleuts into performing this labor, enserfing the Aleuts. As news for the fur trade spread, competition among Russian companies intensified. Catherine the Great, upon ascending to the throne in 1763, expressed goodwill towards the Aleuts and encouraged fair treatment. However, the increasing competition between trading companies, which eventually consolidated into larger and more powerful corporations, led to conflicts that worsened relations with the Indigenous populations. Over time, the situation became dire for the Aleuts and other Native Alaskan people affected by Russian contact.

As the animal populations declined, the Aleuts, already dependent on the new barter economy driven by the fur trade with the Russians, faced increasing pressure to take greater risks in the dangerous waters of the North Pacific to hunt for more otter. The Shelikhov-Golikov Company, and later Russian-American Company developed as a monopoly, using skirmishes and systematic violence as tools for the colonial exploitation of the Indigenous peoples. When the Aleut revolted and won some victories, the Russians retaliated with deadly force, destroying their boats and hunting equipment, leaving them no means of survival.

The most devastating impact on the Aleut population during the initial two generations of Russian contact (1741/1759-1781/1799 AD) was the introduction of new diseases from Eurasia. Approximately 80% of the Aleut population perished from these infectious diseases, to which they had no immunity, unlike Europeans among whom these diseases have been endemic for centuries.

==== Effects of Russian colonization ====
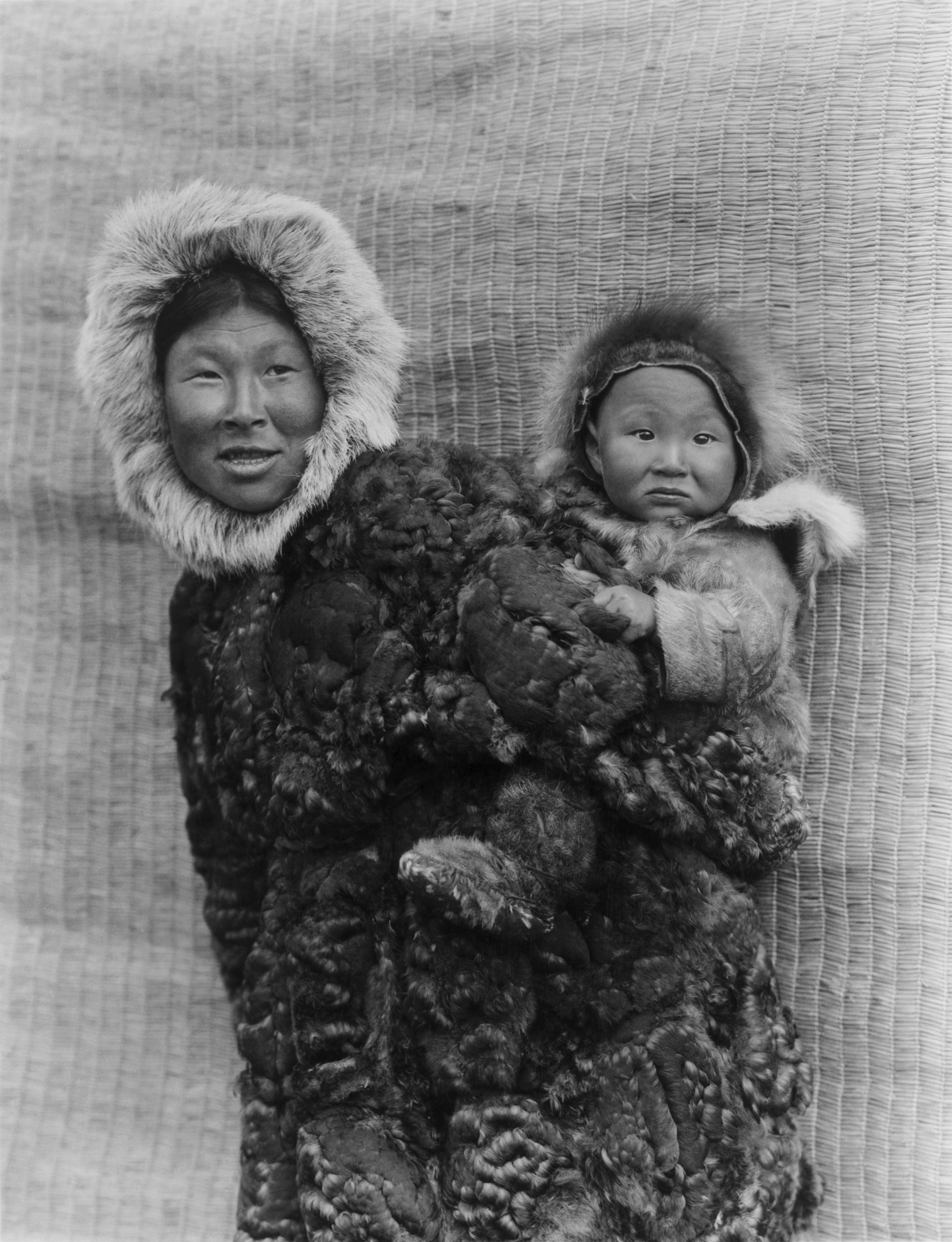
Yupik mother and child, Nunivak Island, c. 1929; photographed by Edward S. Curtis.

The Russian Tsarist government expanded into Indigenous territory in present-day Alaska for its own geopolitical reasons. It consumed natural resources of the territory during the trading years, and Russian Orthodoxy was evangelized. Their movement into these populated areas of Indigenous communities altered the demographic and natural landscape.

Historians have suggested that the Russian-American Company exploited Indigenous peoples as a source of inexpensive labor. The Russian-American Company not only used Indigenous populations for labor during the fur trade, but also held some as hostages to acquire iasak. Iasak, a form of taxation imposed by the Russians, was a tribute in the form of otter pelts. It was a taxation method the Russians had previously found useful in their early encounter with Indigenous communities of Siberia during the Siberian fur trade. Beaver pelts were also customary to be given to fur traders upon first contact with various communities.

The Russian-American Company used military force on Indigenous families, taking them hostage until male community members produced furs for them. Otter furs on Kodiak Island and Aleutian Islands enticed the Russians to start these taxations. Robbery and maltreatment in the form of corporal punishment and the withholding of food was also present upon the arrival of fur traders. Catherine the Great dissolved the giving of tribute in 1799, but her government initiated mandatory conscription of Indigenous men between the ages of 18 and 50 to become seal hunters strictly for the Russian American Company. This mandatory labor gave the Russian American Company an edge in competition with American and British fur traders. But the conscription separated men from their families and villages, thus altering and breaking down communities. With able-bodied men away on the hunt, villages were left with little protection as only women, children, and the elderly remained behind.

In addition to changes that came with conscription, the spread of disease also altered the populations of Indigenous communities. Although records kept in the period were scarce, it has been said that 80% of the pre-contact population of the Aleut people were gone by 1800. The Alaska Native population was first recorded in the 1880 United States census, and it was estimated that the population had declined from 80,000 in 1741 to 33,000 due to disease. The population continued to decline until 1910 and it was not until 1947 that this number surpassed the 1880 figure.

Relationships between Indigenous women and fur traders increased as Indigenous men were away from villages. This resulted in marriages and children that would come to be known as Creole peoples, children who were Indigenous and Russian. To reduce hostilities with Aleutian communities, it became policy for fur traders to enter into marriage with Indigenous women. The Creole population increased in the territory controlled by the Russian American Company.

The growth of the Russian Orthodox Church was another important tactic in the colonization and conversion of Indigenous populations. Ioann Veniaminov, who later became Saint Innocent of Alaska, was an important missionary who carried out the Orthodox Church's agenda to Christianize Indigenous populations. The church encouraged Creole children to follow Russian Orthodox Christianity, while the Russian American Company provided them with an education. Many Orthodox missionaries, like Herman of Alaska, defended Natives from exploitation. Creole people were believed to have high levels of loyalty toward the Russian crown and Russian American Company. After completing their education, children were often sent to Russia, where they would study skills such as mapmaking, theology, and military intelligence. In the 1850s Russia lost much of its interest in Alaska.

=== American colonialism ===
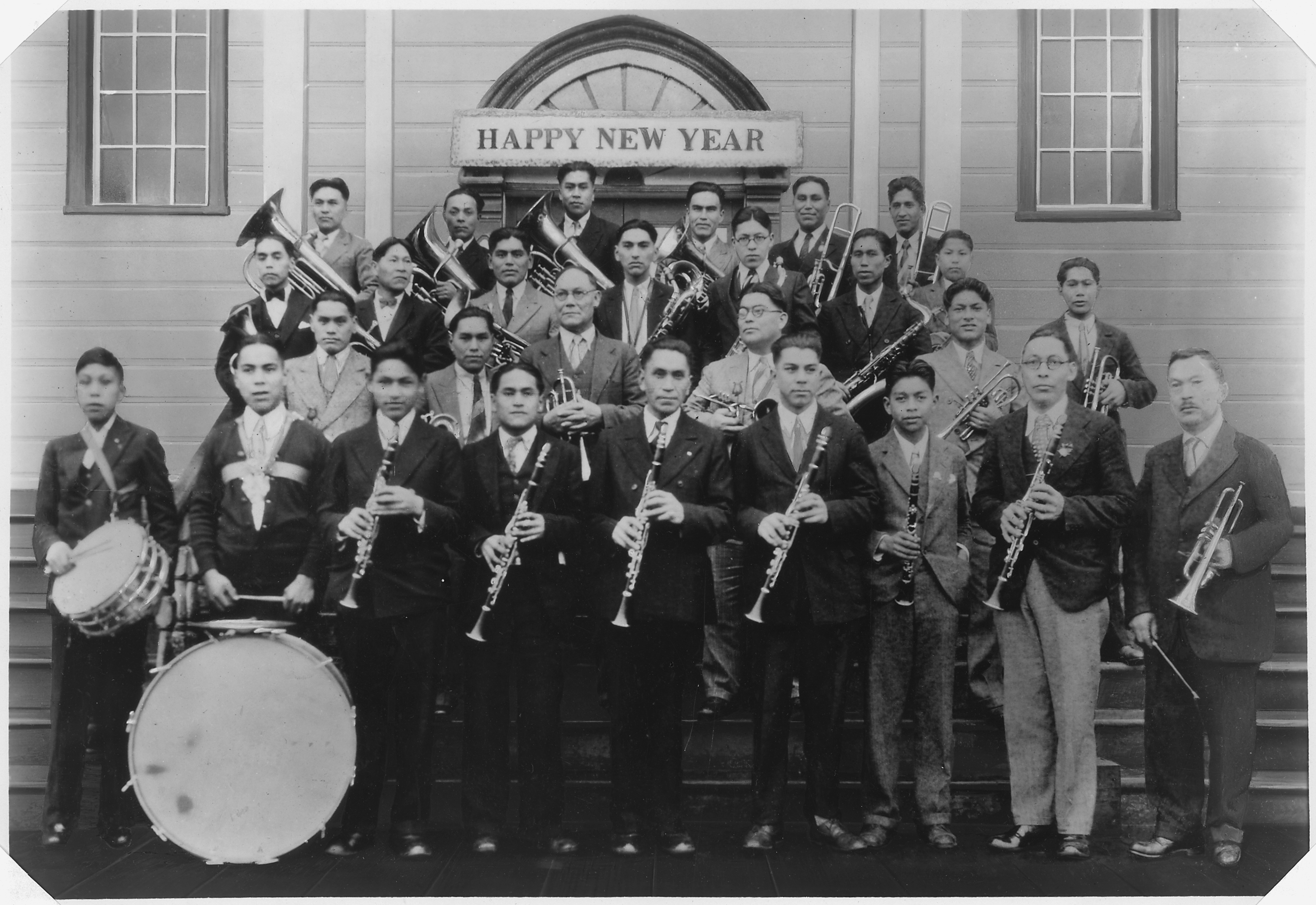
Metlakahtla brass band

Alaska's abundance of natural resources, particularly gold, drew the interest of the United States. In 1867, the United States bought Alaska from Russia. This purchase happened without considering the opinions of the Native Alaskans, who were not regarded as citizens at the time. The land traditionally belonging to Alaska Natives was treated as "open land," allowing white settlers to claim it without providing any compensation or recognition to the Native people living there. The only educational opportunities available for Alaska Natives were in schools established by religious missionaries. Many white settlers failed to appreciate the complex and well-developed cultures that Alaska Natives had created to thrive in their challenging environment. Instead, they viewed them as inferior to European Americans, which aligned with white supremacist ideologies.

The Klondike Gold Rush of 1896–1898 led to increased white settlement in Alaska and brought discriminatory practices against Indigenous peoples. American settlers imposed racial segregation and discriminatory laws similar to Jim Crow laws, which severely limited Alaska Natives' opportunities and cultural practices, effectively treating them as second-class citizens. This segregation manifested in various ways, including "whites only" signs that prevented natives from entering certain buildings. Educational discrimination was also prevalent. In an 1880 court case, a child was barred from attending school with Americans because his stepfather was native. Children of mixed heritage could only attend American schools if their families abandoned their native culture. Simultaneously, the U.S. government implemented policies to disrupt Alaska Native family structures. Federal records show that disrupting native family units was a deliberate part of Federal Indian policy aimed at assimilating Indigenous children. The Federal Indian Boarding School Initiative played a major role in creating intergenerational trauma by removing children from their native villages and placing them in off-reservation boarding schools alongside children from other tribes. This system created artificial communities of Indigenous children throughout the boarding school network, resulting in new Indigenous family structures depending on whether children returned to their native villages or settled elsewhere after completing their education. These policies prohibited Alaska Native children from speaking their native languages, wearing traditional clothing, associating with other natives, consuming traditional foods, or practicing their religions. The resulting family separation and cultural eradication caused significant intergenerational trauma.

In 1912, the Alaska Native Brotherhood (ANB) was formed to help fight for citizenship rights. The Alaska Native Sisterhood (ANS) was created in 1915. Also in 1915, the Alaska Territorial legislature passed a law allowing Alaskan Natives the right to vote – but on the condition that they give up their cultural customs and traditions. The Indian Citizenship Act, passed in 1924, gave all Native Americans United States citizenship.

ANB began to hold a great deal of political power in the 1920s. They protested the segregation of Alaska Natives in public areas and institutions, and also staged boycotts. Alberta Schenck (Inupiaq) staged a well-publicized protest against segregation in a movie theater in 1944. With the help of Elizabeth Peratrovich (Tlingit), the Alaska Equal Rights Act of 1945 was passed, ending segregation in Alaska.

In 1942, during World War II, the United States forced evacuation of around nine hundred Aleuts from the Aleutian Islands. The idea was to remove the Aleuts from a potential combat zone during World War II for their own protection, but European Americans living in the same area were not forced to leave. The removal was handled so poorly that many Aleuts died after they were evacuated; the elderly and children had the highest mortality rates. Survivors returned to the islands to find their homes and possessions destroyed or looted. Civil rights activists such as Alberta Schenck Adams and Elizabeth Peratrovich protested discriminatory laws against Native Alaskans with what were effectively sit-ins and lobbying.

The Alaska Equal Rights Act of 1945, the first anti-discrimination state law in the U.S., occurred as a result of these protests. It entitled all Alaskans to "full and equal enjoyment" of public areas and businesses, a ban on segregating signs, with discriminatory actions punishable by a $250 fine and up to 30 days in jail.

Alaska became part of the United States in 1959 upon President Dwight D. Eisenhower recognizing Alaska as the 49th state.

==== ANCSA and since (1971 to present) ====
A Koyukon man in intertribal powwow regalia

In 1971, with the support of Alaska Native leaders such as Emil Notti, Willie Hensley, and Byron Mallott, the U.S. Congress passed the Alaska Native Claims Settlement Act (ANCSA), which settled land and financial claims for lands and resources which the Alaska Natives had lost to European-Americans. It provided for the establishment of thirteen Alaska Native Regional Corporations to administer those claims. Similar to the separately defined status of the Canadian Inuit and First Nations in Canada, which are recognized as distinct peoples, in the United States, Alaska Natives or Native Alaskans are in some respects treated separately by the government from other Native Americans in the United States. This is in part related to their interactions with the U.S. government which occurred in a different historical period than its interactions during the period of westward expansion during the 19th century.

Europeans and Americans did not have sustained encounters with the Alaska Natives until the late 19th and early 20th centuries when many were attracted to the region in gold rushes. The Alaska Natives were not allotted individual title in severalty to land under the Dawes Act of 1887 but were instead treated under the Alaska Native Allotment Act of 1906.

The Allotment Act was repealed in 1971, following ANSCA, at which time reservations were ended. Another characteristic difference is that Alaska Native tribal governments do not have the power to collect taxes for business transacted on tribal land, per the United States Supreme Court decision in Alaska v. Native Village of Venetie Tribal Government (1998). Except for the Tsimshian, Alaska Natives no longer hold reservations but do control some lands. Under the Marine Mammal Protection Act of 1972, Alaska Natives reserve the right to harvest whales and other marine mammals.

== Climate change ==
Four Indigenous tribes in Alaska, the Shishmaref, Kivalina, Shaktoolik, and Newtok tribes, are among America's first climate refugees due to the impacts of sea ice melting and increased wildfires in their regions. Climate change has created extensive challenges for Alaska's native peoples, including increased vulnerability to disease, mental health issues, physical injuries, and food and water insecurity. According to the Environmental Protection Agency (EPA), coastal erosion from sea ice loss is displacing native communities. This melting also disrupts the migration patterns of animals that tribes depend on for sustenance, while eliminating traditional places to store harvested food. As permafrost thaws, existing infrastructure becomes unstable, leading to the collapse of Native villages.

The Shishmaref, Kivalina, Shaktoolik, and Newtok tribes are situated on Alaska's west coast, where rising sea levels have intensified storm surges that erode their coastlines. These communities face forced migration because there is no suitable nearby land to relocate to, requiring them to abandon their traditional ways of life. Predictions indicate that a significant climate event could completely submerge these tribal lands in fewer than fifteen years.

The changing climate has heightened safety risks for Alaska Natives. While thick ice layers were historically present year-round, warming temperatures have thinned the ice, increasing incidents of people falling through—a dangerous situation that leads to additional health concerns even for survivors. Water insecurity and deteriorating infrastructure have created sanitation problems, contributing to an increase in respiratory illnesses across Alaska. In 2005, pneumonia became the leading cause of hospitalizations in these regions. Many affected communities experience significant psychological stress due to both the immediate impacts of climate change and the complex challenges of relocation without established policies or pathways. Additional stress comes from infrastructure damage caused by thawing permafrost, with minimal regulatory guidance beyond the Alaskan government's recommendations to avoid building on permafrost or to use extra insulation on foundation walls. Food security has also deteriorated as animals relocate to more suitable habitats. Traditional underground ice cellars, once frozen year-round, now thaw during summer months, rendering food supplies inedible.

== Subsistence ==
Gathering of subsistence food continues to be an important economic and cultural activity for many Alaska Natives. In Utqiaġvik, Alaska, in 2005, more than 91 percent of the Iñupiat households which were interviewed still participated in the local subsistence economy, compared with the approximately 33 percent of non-Iñupiat households who used wild resources obtained from hunting, fishing, or gathering.

But, unlike many tribes in the contiguous United States, Alaska Natives do not have treaties with the United States that protect their subsistence rights, except for the right to harvest whales and other marine mammals. The Alaska Native Claims Settlement Act explicitly extinguished aboriginal hunting and fishing rights in the state of Alaska.

== Ethnicity by region ==
Census 2010, Table 16 (Alaska).

American Indian and Alaska Native Tribe/Tribal grouping	American Indian and Alaska Native alone		American Indian and Alaska Native in combination with one or more other races		American Indian and Alaska Native alone or in any combination
Type of response	One tribe/tribal grouping reported	Two or more tribes/tribal groupings reported	One tribe/tribal grouping reported	Two or more tribes/tribal groupings reported	Total
American Indian and Alaska Native (300, A01-Z99) Tallied	101 595	6 582	31 572	3 766	143 515
American Indian and Alaska Native (300, A01-Z99) Total population	101 595	3 276	31 572	1 869	138 312
American Indian (Continental USA)	5 070	628	6 273	1 046	13 017
Alaskan Athabascan tribal grouping (M52-N27)	12 318	594	3 398	355	16 665
Tlingit-Haida tribal grouping (N28-N55, N59-N66)	8 547	526	3 796	317	13 186
Tsimshian tribal grouping (N56-N58)	1 449	136	269	85	1 939
Inupiat tribal grouping (N67-P29, P33-P37)	20 941	565	3 899	282	25 687
Yup'ik tribal grouping (P30-P32, P38-R10)	27 329	577	2 741	221	30 868
Aleut tribal grouping (R11-R98, S01-S99)	7 696	496	2 715	309	11 216
Alaska Native, not specified (M44-M51)	17 051	16	8 127	3	25 197
American Indian or Alaska Native tribes, not specified (300)	2 708	-	921	-	3 629

According to the 2010 census this was the ethnic breakdown of Alaska Natives by region, the total is 100% for each region:

Region	% of Alaskan Athabascan	% of Aleut	% of Inupiat	% of Tlingit-Haida	% of Tsimshian	% of Yupik	% of other or unspecified
Aleutians East Borough	0.63%	95.58%	0.25%	0.13%	0.00%	0.76%	2.65%
Aleutians West Census Area	1.74%	83.03%	2.72%	1.85%	1.31%	3.37%	5.98%
Anchorage Municipality	16.28%	14.97%	22.94%	8.42%	0.83%	18.17%	18.39%
Bethel Census Area	1.44%	0.34%	3.29%	0.18%	0.01%	93.65%	1.09%
Bristol Bay Borough	1.74%	35.43%	1.74%	0.22%	0.00%	54.13%	6.74%
Denali Borough	38.30%	5.32%	6.38%	0.00%	0.00%	9.57%	40.43%
Dillingham Census Area	1.08%	3.34%	2.67%	0.22%	0.00%	91.16%	1.53%
Fairbanks North Star Borough	48.79%	2.77%	17.37%	3.45%	0.12%	7.06%	20.44%
Haines Borough	0.00%	1.42%	1.77%	75.53%	0.35%	2.13%	18.79%
Hoonah-Angoon Census Area	1.48%	1.17%	3.28%	84.85%	0.00%	1.06%	8.16%
Juneau City and Borough	2.34%	3.65%	3.42%	75.13%	2.24%	2.22%	11.00%
Kenai Peninsula Borough	29.02%	17.81%	13.88%	5.03%	0.54%	11.54%	22.18%
Ketchikan Gateway Borough	3.36%	5.71%	1.55%	62.37%	14.74%	0.97%	11.29%
Kodiak Island Borough	2.29%	78.11%	1.80%	2.19%	0.05%	5.11%	10.46%
Lake and Peninsula Borough	18.41%	54.27%	1.59%	1.59%	0.18%	21.59%	2.38%
Matanuska-Susitna Borough	16.61%	15.31%	17.88%	6.57%	0.41%	13.00%	30.21%
Nome Census Area	1.03%	0.32%	67.46%	0.33%	0.05%	29.60%	1.21%
North Slope Borough	0.83%	0.20%	95.72%	0.36%	0.00%	1.37%	1.52%
Northwest Arctic Borough	0.75%	0.29%	96.52%	0.29%	0.14%	1.08%	0.93%
Petersburg Census Area	0.72%	2.87%	2.01%	82.09%	0.43%	0.14%	11.75%
Prince of Wales-Hyder Census Area	0.79%	1.63%	1.94%	41.43%	47.38%	1.50%	5.33%
Sitka City and Borough	2.36%	4.03%	3.72%	72.98%	3.40%	3.14%	10.37%
Skagway Municipality	0.00%	15.22%	4.35%	47.83%	13.04%	0.00%	19.57%
Southeast Fairbanks Census Area	77.20%	1.05%	6.49%	1.88%	0.00%	2.41%	10.98%
Valdez-Cordova Census Area	42.61%	29.24%	5.16%	3.95%	0.70%	4.14%	14.20%
Wade Hampton Census Area	0.52%	0.31%	13.13%	0.05%	0.00%	85.65%	0.34%
Wrangell City and Borough	1.23%	7.80%	1.23%	72.07%	4.11%	0.41%	13.14%
Yakutat City and Borough	6.62%	3.48%	6.27%	77.70%	0.00%	2.44%	3.48%
Yukon–Koyukuk Census Area	95.51%	0.25%	1.78%	0.08%	0.00%	1.20%	1.18%

== See also ==
- List of Alaska Native Tribal Entities, the list of Native Villages and other "tribal entities" recognized by the US Bureau of Indian Affairs.
- Prehistory of Alaska
- First Alaskans Institute
- Indigenous Amerindian genetics
- Circumpolar peoples
- Indigenous peoples of the Pacific Northwest Coast
- Indigenous peoples of the Subarctic
- Alaska Native Language Center
