= Romanism =

Historical and derogatory name for Roman Catholicism

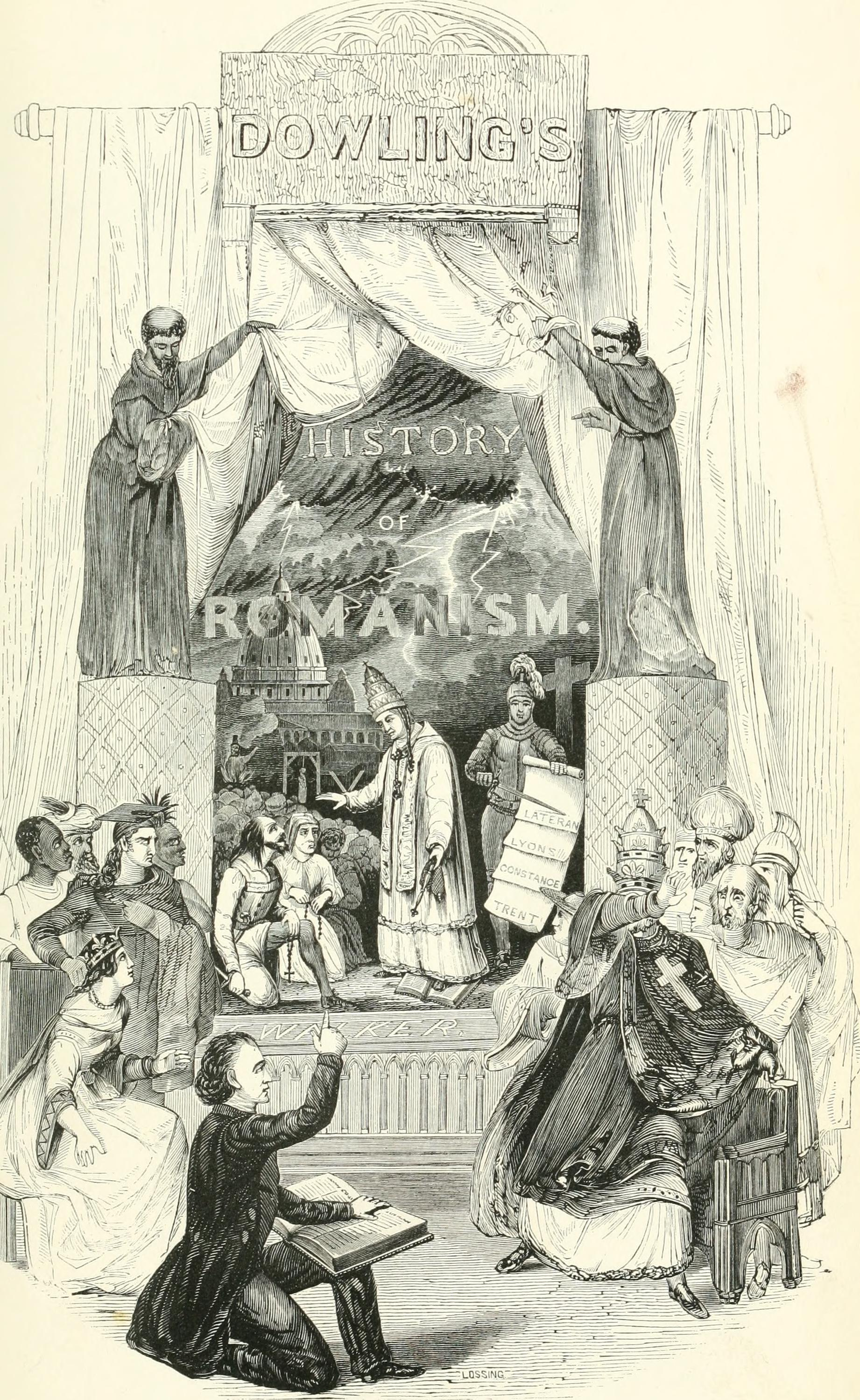
Drawing depicting Pastor John Dowling authoring his book The History of Romanism

Romanism is a derogatory term for Roman Catholicism used when anti-Catholicism was more common in the United States.

The word was first attested in 1603. The Fundamentals, often seen as the foundation of Christian fundamentalism, saw "Romanism" as the "single greatest threat to authentic Christian faith" according to Douglas E. Cowan, and included an article titled Is Romanism Christianity? in which T. W. Medhurst, a student of the famous preacher Charles Spurgeon, called Romanism a "Satanic delusion."

The term was frequently used in late-nineteenth and early-twentieth century Republican invectives against the Democrats, as part of the slogan "Rum, Romanism, and Rebellion" (referencing the Democratic Party's constituency of Southerners and anti-Temperance, frequently Catholic, working-class immigrants). A book titled The Three Keys to Hell; or, Rum, Romanism and Ruin was published in 1915. The term and slogan gained particular prominence in the 1884 presidential campaign and again in 1928, in which the Democratic candidate was the outspokenly anti-Prohibition Catholic Governor of New York Al Smith.

In Northern Ireland, the term was also used by Democratic Unionist Party founder Ian Paisley in anti-Catholic speeches.

== See also ==
- Know Nothing
- Pope in the White House
- Papist
- Popish Plot
