= C. H. Wilcox =

American politician and journalist (1867–1948)

6th Speaker of the Alaska Territorial House of Representatives
- In office March 2, 1925 – March 7, 1927
- Preceded by: Cash Cole
- Succeeded by: Sumner Smith

Member of the Alaska Territorial House of Representatives from the 3rd district
- In office March 2, 1925 – March 7, 1927

Personal details
- Born: Charles Herbert Wilcox Jr. September 1, 1867 Danbury, Connecticut, U.S.
- Died: 1948 (aged 80–81)
- Party: Democratic
- Children: 2
- Occupation: Politician, journalist

Charles Herbert "C. H." Wilcox Jr. (September 1, 1867 – 1948) was an American politician and journalist from Valdez, Alaska, who served in the Alaska Territorial House of Representatives from 1925 to 1927, representing the 3rd electoral district as a Democrat in the 8th territorial legislature. He concurrently served as the sixth speaker of the Alaska Territorial House of Representatives.

== Early life ==
Wilcox was born in Danbury, Connecticut, on September 1, 1867.

== Career ==
As a journalist in the Territory of Alaska, Wilcox worked as an editor for Valdez Daily Prospector and Valdez Miner in Valdez. He was also a copublisher of Cordova Weekly and Daily Times in Cordova.

As a politician, Wilcox served one term in the Alaska Territorial House of Representatives, representing the 3rd electoral district from 1925 to 1927 as a Democrat in the 8th territorial legislature. He simultaneously served one term as the sixth speaker of the Alaska Territorial House of Representatives.

Outside of the Alaska Territorial Legislature, Wilcox served as a chief deputy U.S. Marshal and deputy court clerk for Valdez and Anchorage.

== Personal life and death ==
Wilcox was married and had two children. He died in 1948.

Alaska House of Representatives
Preceded by —	Member of the Alaska Territorial House of Representatives from the 3rd district 1925–1927	Succeeded by —
Preceded by Cash Cole	Speaker of the Alaska Territorial House of Representatives; 1925–1927	Succeeded by Sumner Smith
