= Norman R. Walker =

Canadian-born American pharmacist and politician

Norman Ray "Doc" Walker

President of the Alaska Territorial Senate
- In office 1939–1941
- Preceded by: M.E.S. Brunelle
- Succeeded by: Henry Roden

Member of the Alaska Senate from the 1st district
- In office March 6, 1933 – January 24, 1949 Serving with Allen Shattuck (1933-1935, 1945-1947); Henry Roden (1935-1943); Arthur P. Walker (1943-1945); Andrew Gunderson (1945-1947); Joe Green (1945-1949); Frank Peratrovich (1947-1949); L.P. Dawes (1947-1949)
- Preceded by: Charles Benjamin
- Succeeded by: R.M. MacKenzie

Personal details
- Born: July 28, 1889 Regina, Saskatchewan, Canada
- Died: April 5, 1949 (aged 59)
- Party: Democratic

Norman Ray "Doc" Walker (July 28, 1889 – April 5, 1949) was a Canadian-born American pharmacist and politician, best known as the longest-serving member of Alaska's territorial legislature. Born in Regina, Saskatchewan, Walker emigrated to the United States as a youth, later serving in the United States Army and attending Washington State University. He was a pharmacist in Seattle, Washington and then moved to Ketchikan, Alaska and owned the Walker-Broderick House. Walker served as mayor of Ketchikan from 1930 to 1932 and then served in the Alaska Territorial Senate from 1933 until 1947. He lost reelection to his Senate seat in 1948 after feuding with territorial governor Ernest Gruening over Gruening's efforts to overhaul the territory's tax structure. Walker was also head of the Alaska Territorial Pharmacy Board.
