= Alaska Native Brotherhood Hall =

- U.S. National Register of Historic Places
- U.S. National Historic Landmark
- Alaska Heritage Resources Survey
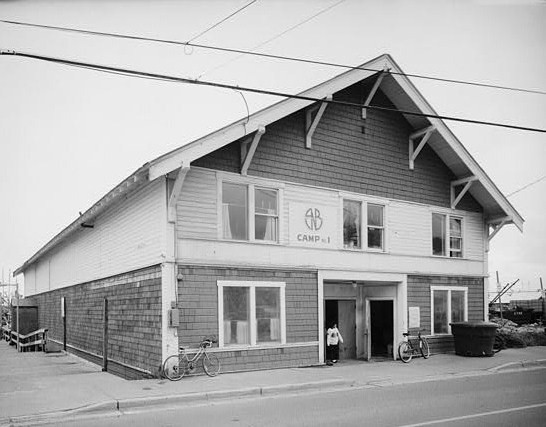
- Native Brotherhood Hall, Sitka Camp No. 1

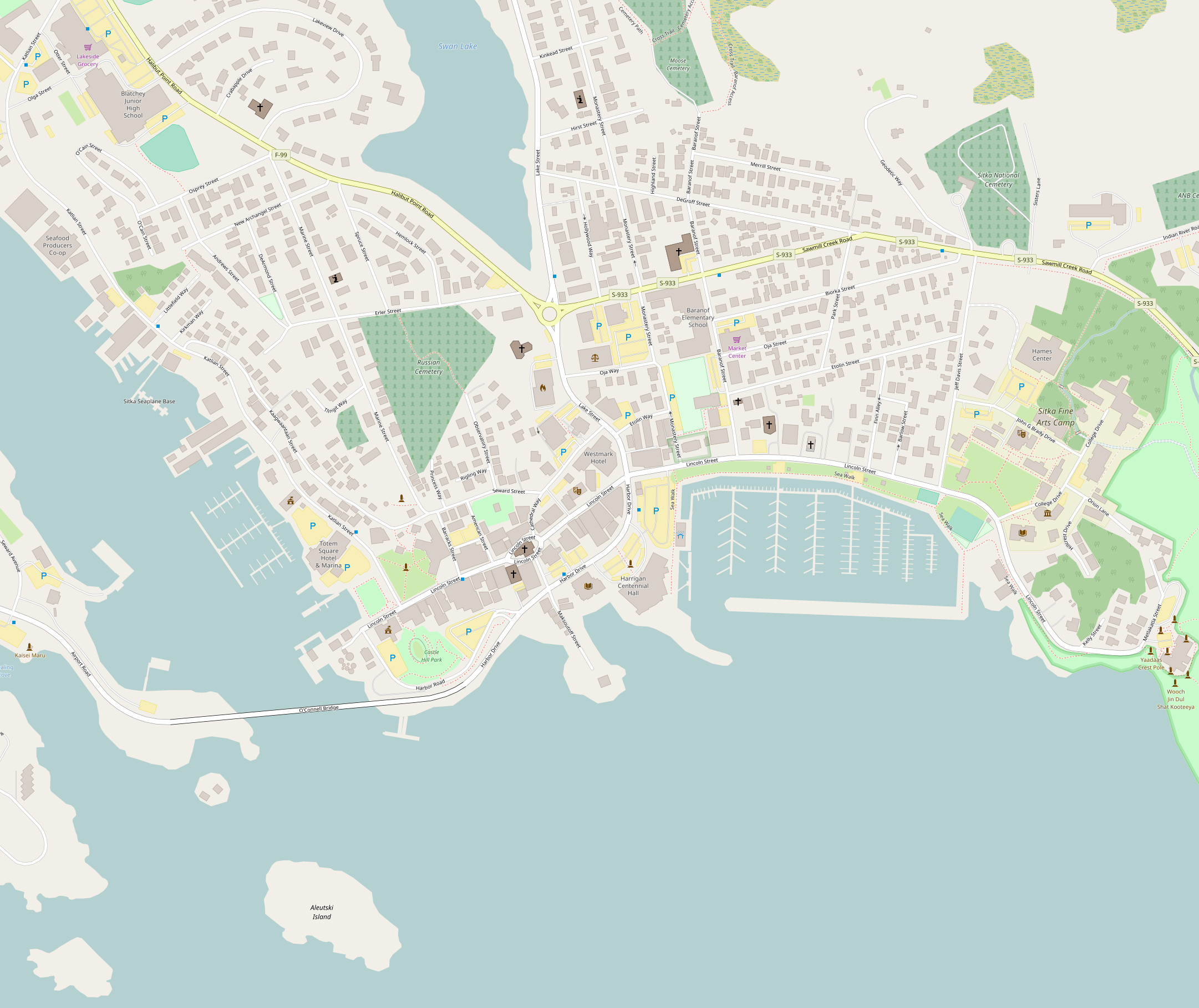
- Location within Downtown Sitka Location within Alaska
- Location: 235 Katlian Street, Sitka, Alaska
- Coordinates: 57°03′03″N 135°20′28″W
- Area: 0.25 acres (0.10 ha)
- Built: 1914
- Built by: Alaska Native Brotherhood
- NRHP reference No.: 72000192
- AHRS No.: SIT-001

Significant dates
- Added to NRHP: February 23, 1972
- Designated NHL: June 2, 1987
- Designated AHRS: August 20, 1971

Alaska Native Brotherhood Hall, or Sitka Camp No. 1, is significant for being the original chapter of the Alaska Native Brotherhood, an Alaska-wide Native organization. It is located on the waterfront in Sitka, Alaska, on Katlian Street.

The two-story building, built in 1914, is of wood-frame construction, and is about 40 feet (12 m) wide and 60 feet (18 m) long. Most of its length extends out over water, supported on pilings. The roof is trimmed at front and back by plain bargeboard with seven unadorned corbel-like supports in the form of triangular struts. Architectural evidence suggests that the building has been altered and enlarged; adding the front quarter of the building and raising the roof to a full two stories probably occurred sometime after its original construction.

The interior of the building is mainly taken up by a large two-story auditorium, with the stage at the rear (over the water). A narrow gallery, accessed by stairs within the auditorium space, wraps around its rear and side walls. The front of the building has a lobby area on the first floor, and office space for the Brotherhood on the second floor.

The Alaska Native Brotherhood was founded in Sitka by Tlingit natives in 1912 as a vehicle to fight discrimination against them in restaurants and movie theaters. The organization, which now has a much broader membership across Alaska's many native groups, has been successful in bringing about significant changes for its members, including securing United States citizenship for Alaska natives and passage of the Alaska Historic Preservation Act.

The hall was added to the National Register of Historic Places in 1972 and was declared a National Historic Landmark in 1987.

== See also ==
- List of National Historic Landmarks in Alaska
- National Register of Historic Places listings in Sitka City and Borough, Alaska
