= Allen Shattuck =

American politician (1872–1960)

President of the Alaska Senate
- In office March 6, 1933 – January 14, 1935
- Preceded by: Luther Hess
- Succeeded by: Luther Hess

Member of the Alaska Senate from the 1st district
- In office March 2, 1931 – January 14, 1935 Serving with Charles Benjamin (1931-1933); Norman R. Walker (1933-1935)
- Preceded by: Will A. Steel
- Succeeded by: Henry Roden

Member of the Alaska Senate from the 1st district
- In office January 22, 1945 – January 27, 1947 Serving with Norman R. Walker; Joe Green; Andrew Gunderson

Member of the Alaska House of Representatives from the 1st district
- In office March 4, 1929 – March 2, 1931 Serving with Peter C. McCormack; Grover C. Winn; A. H. Ziegler

Member of the Alaska House of Representatives from the 1st district
- In office January 27, 1941 – January 25, 1943 Serving with James V. Davis; Crystal S. Jenne; John L. McCormick

Personal details
- Born: Allen Shattuck; October 26, 1872 Portland, Oregon, US
- Died: July 1, 1960 (aged 87) Marin County, California, US
- Political party: Democratic
- Spouse: May Agnes Swineford
- Children: 3, including Curtis
- Relatives: Henry Shattuck (brother); Lewis Shattuck (brother); Alfred P. Swineford (step-father-in-law)

Allen Shattuck (October 26, 1872 – July 1, 1960) was a prominent Juneau businessman and American politician who served as member of the territorial legislature of Alaska and was president of the Alaska Territorial Senate between 1933 and 1935.

== Biography ==
Shattuck was born in Portland, Oregon in 1872 to John W. Shattuck, a confederate veteran of the Civil War and Mary Cochran Shattuck (nee Allen), a pioneer family to the area. Shattuck was the third of nine children, his oldest brother Lewis Shattuck became the first mayor of Gresham, Oregon.

Shattuck moved to Juneau in the late 1800s and in 1900 he became part of the Shattuck & Co insurance company which had become an independent agency two years previously by E.F. Cassel and Shattuck's brother Henry Shattuck (himself prominent Juneau businessman and namesake of the Casey-Shattuck Historic neighbourhood and Shattuck Way in Juneau). Shattuck purchased the other interests in 1913 becoming the sole proprietor. His business activity made him a prominent resident of Juneau and he became president of the Juneau Commercial Association.

=== Political career ===
Shattuck entered politics in 1929, serving two terms in the Alaska Territorial House of Representatives and three terms in the Alaska Territorial Senate between 1929 and 1947, serving as the president of the Alaska Territorial Senate between 1933 and 1935. Though elected as a Democrat he opposed the policies of Democratic President Roosevelt.

He was a long-time outspoken opponent of Alaskan Statehood being one of very few opponents.

He is remembered today for his unsuccessful opposition to the Alaska Equal Rights Act of 1945.

== Personal life ==
Shattuck was married to May Agnes Swineford with whom he had three children: Allen, Virginia and Curtis who also served in the Territorial Legislature.
