= China Joe =

Chinese-American merchant

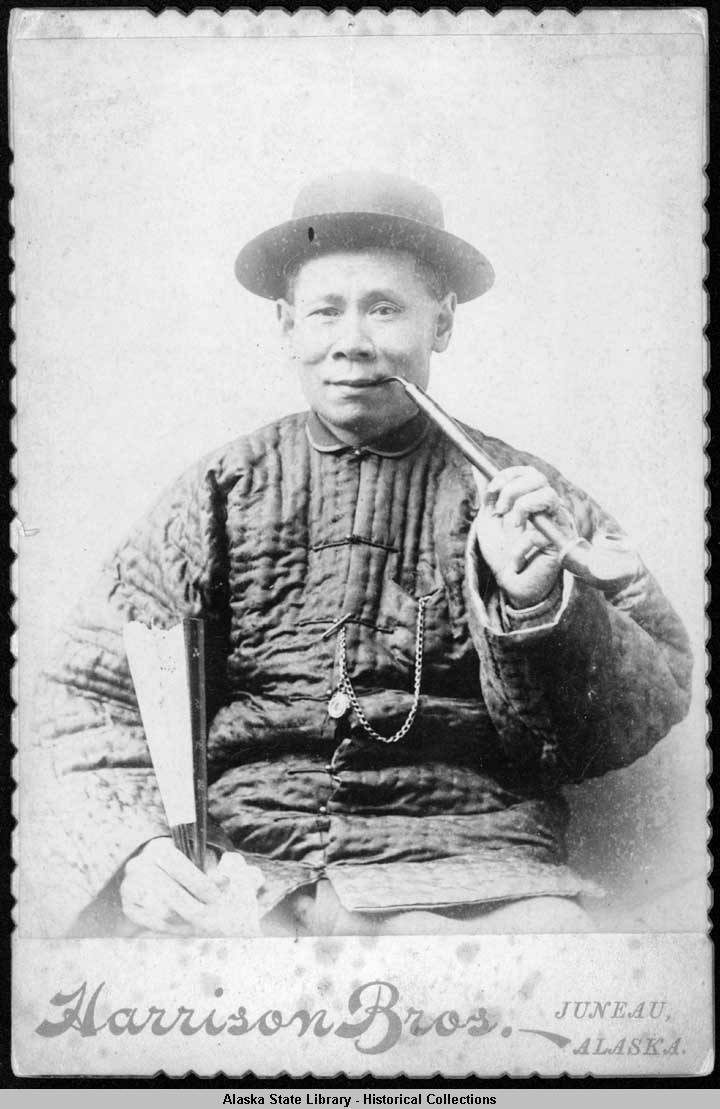

China Joe (c. 1834 - May 17/18, 1917,) was a Chinese-American merchant who worked in Alaska during its gold-mining boom days in the late 19th and early 20th centuries.

His Chinese name is not known exactly, and varies from source to source:

- As Hie in Juneau in 1881
- Chew Chung Thui
- Hi Ching as listed in an 1880 census conducted by the United States Navy
- Hi Chung in Juneau newspapers of 1892 and 1894, and upon joining the '87 Pioneers Association
- Lee Hing
- Ting Tu Wee or Chung Thui upon registering under a Chinese Registration Act of 1893

Joe first came to North America in 1864, landing in Victoria, British Columbia and moving to Boise, Idaho. He moved to the Cassiar region in 1874 and operated a bakery near Dease Lake. He was known for fair prices of his goods, especially around 1875 when the area's primary supply route, the Stikine River, froze early and steamboats were unable to deliver items such as flour. He was well known for his generosity toward miners.

He moved to Wrangell about 1878. He purchased an abandoned steam wheeler named the Hope, built a restaurant and bakery in the hull, and rented out the staterooms. The business worked well for about a year until Wrangell began to decline. Joe then moved to Sitka, Alaska and operated a bakery there.

In the summer of 1881 Joe moved to Juneau. He bought half of a town lot on July 18 at the corner of Third and Main streets. The estate cost US$60. There he opened the city's first bakery, where he lived for 36 years. Supporters worked to keep Joe in Juneau when Chinese workers in the Treadwell gold mine were forced out of the city in 1886. Joe was proud to be an active member of the early Juneau community. He is buried in Juneau's Evergreen Cemetery under the name Hi Chung.
