= Alaska Native Brotherhood/Sisterhood =

Advocacy group for natives of Alaska

Alaska Native Brotherhood / Alaska Native Sisterhood
- Abbreviation: ANB / ANS

The Alaska Native Brotherhood (ANB) and its counterpart, the Alaska Native Sisterhood (ANS), are two nonprofit organizations founded to address racism against Alaska Native peoples in Alaska. ANB was formed in 1912 and ANS founded three years later. For the first half of the 20th century, they were the only organizations working for the civil rights of Alaska Natives in the territory and state.

== History ==
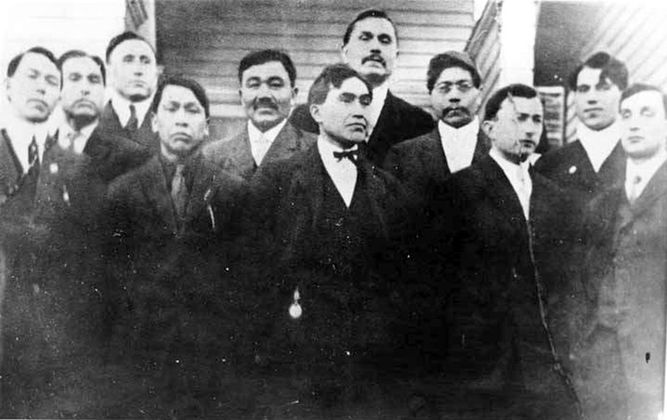
Alaska Native Brotherhood founding fathers in 1912

Thirteen Alaska Natives who attended Sheldon Jackson Training School came together in 1912 to form the Alaska Native Brotherhood (ANB). The founders were George Fields, William Hobson, James C. Jackson, Eli Kalanvok, Seward Kunz, Paul Liberty, Frank Mercer, Marie Moon Orsen, Frank Price, James Watson, Chester Worthington, and Ralph Young. Peter Simpson (Tsimshian) was the first president of the group and is often known as the "father of the ANB." The original members wanted Alaska Natives to be able to access education and improve their standing in the community. Alaska was a segregated society at the time. The rights of Alaska Natives to their own land and fishing and hunting grounds had also been lost.

The Alaska Native Brotherhood Hall, built in 1914 on the waterfront in Sitka, was the first facility owned by the organization. For the significance of the ANB, the hall has been designated a National Historic Landmark. In 1915, the Alaska Native Sisterhood (ANS) was formed by women in Wrangell, Alaska. ANS worked with ANB on civil rights and voting rights issues. Also in 1915, ANB and ANS were able to help pass the Native Citizen Act.

In the late 1920s and the 1930s, ANB began to boycott places that had "No Natives" signs. Many of the boycotts in southeastern Alaska were effective. Louis Paul (Tlingit) and William Paul (Tlingit) emerged as leaders of the ANB during this time.

During the 1930s, the Alaska Native Brotherhood obtained at least one Civilian Conservation Corps grant from the Franklin D. Roosevelt administration to restore and preserve totem poles. One $24,000 grant enabled work with architect Linn A. Forrest, an American architect of Juneau, to construct the Shakes Island Community House and to preserve totems at Wrangell in 1937–1939 during the Great Depression.

Elizabeth Peratrovich (Tlingit), member and grand president of the ANS, did organizing, wrote petitions, and testified to the state senate in 1945 for civil rights of Alaska Natives. She helped win passage of the 1945 state anti-discrimination act. As president of ANS she encouraged indigenous women to apply for federal and territorial grants to help their households. Peratrovich also grew the organization by recruiting new members. Amy Hallingstad (Tlingit) helped Peratrovich to integrate schools and advocate for more resources.

== Position on possession of eagle feathers ==
In 2005, the organization opposed U.S. federal law that makes the collection and ownership of bald eagle feathers illegal, as these have been integral to spiritual and cultural practices of Alaska Natives.

== See also ==
- Alaska Equal Rights Act of 1945
- Outline of United States federal Indian law and policy
- Pioneers of Alaska
