= Evergreen Cemetery (Juneau, Alaska) =

Cemetery in Juneau, Alaska

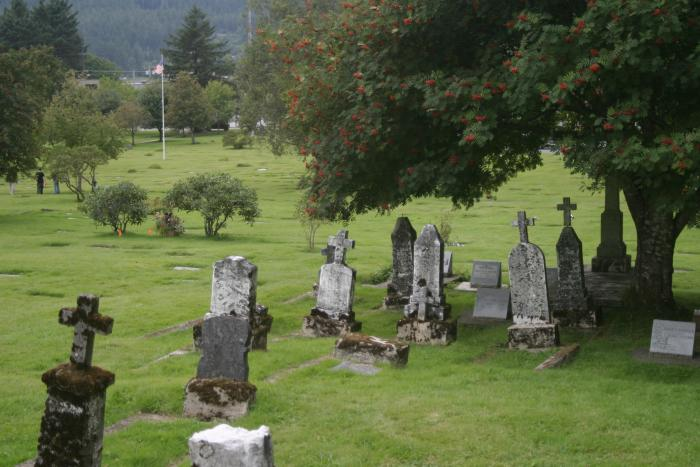
- Interactive map of Evergreen Cemetery

Details
- Established: 1887
- Location: Juneau, Alaska
- Country: United States
- Coordinates: 58.3047°N 134.4236°W
- Type: Public
- Owned by: Juneau City and Borough
- Size: 10 acres (4.0 ha)
- Find a Grave: Evergreen Cemetery
- The Political Graveyard: Evergreen Cemetery

Evergreen Cemetery is a cemetery in Juneau, the capital of the U.S. state of Alaska. It was established in 1887 to replace the older cemetery on Chicken Ridge, near Main Street, when that location was staked as a gold mine. Most of the graves in this older cemetery were moved to the new cemetery between 1889 and 1892 and the rest were moved in about 1915. The grounds were deeded by Evergreen Cemetery Association to the City of Juneau on May 23, 1907.

Evergreen Cemetery is operated by the Juneau Department of Parks and Recreation, and was Juneau's main cemetery from 1887 until Alaskan Memorial Park in Mendenhall Valley opened in the 1970s.

== Notable interments ==
- Richard Harris (died October 11, 1907, buried December 28, 1907), co-founder of Juneau
- Walter Harper and his bride
- Waino Edward Hendrickson, mayor of Juneau 1946–1953 and acting territorial governor 1957 and 1958–1959
- Xenia Andreyevna Kashevaroff (died September 26, 1995), ex-wife of John Cage and noted surrealist painter, sculptor, bookbinder, conservator, and musician
- Joe Juneau (died March, 1899, buried August 16, 1903), co-founder of Juneau
- Alfred P. Swineford, district governor 1885–1889
- China Joe
- Elizabeth Peratrovich (died December 1, 1958), civil rights activist, Grand President of the Alaska Native Sisterhood, and member of the Tlingit nation who worked for equality on behalf of Alaska Natives.
- Charles W. Carter, former mortician of Evergreen Cemetery

== See also ==
- List of cemeteries in Alaska
