= Alberta Schenck Adams =

- Born: Alberta Schenck; June 1, 1928; Nome, Alaska
- Died: July 6, 2009 (aged 81); Anaheim, California
- Resting place: Anchorage Memorial Park Cemetery
- Known for: Challenging Alaska's segregation practices
- Children: MaryJill, Yvonne Rose

Alberta Daisy Schenck Adams (June 1, 1928 – July 6, 2009) was a teenage civil rights activist in the struggle for equality by the indigenous peoples in the United States Territory of Alaska. Her 1944 challenge to segregation practices was cited during the Territorial Legislature's proceedings in passage of Alaska's 1945 anti-discrimination law, a decade before the Brown v. Board of Education decision outlawed segregation in public schools, and before Rosa Parks in Alabama sparked a public bus boycott by refusing to give up her seat to a white person.

== Early life and segregated Alaska ==
Alberta Schenck was born in Nome, Alaska, on June 1, 1928, to Albert Schenck, a white army veteran of World War I, and Mary Pushruk Schenck of Inupiaq heritage. She was born into an era when the indigenous peoples of Alaska were subjected to segregated practices that often left non-white children without an education for lack of facilities. Some segregated business establishments advertised that all their employees were white.

== Alaska Dream Theatre incident ==
When Alberta was a high school girl in 1944, she had a part-time job ushering at the Alaska Dream Theatre in Nome, where part of her job was to make sure non-white patrons sat in their designated segregated area. She eventually registered a complaint with the theatre's manager and was fired. Alberta's response became an opinion article on March 3, 1944, in The Nome Nugget newspaper. She returned later with a white date, and the two of them sat in the "Whites Only" section. She and her army sergeant date refused to move when the manager demanded she move to the non-white section. The theater manager contacted the local police who arrested Schenck and placed her in jail for one night. Schenck's arrest rallied the local Iñupiat community, who staged a protest at the theater until her release from jail the next day.

== Anti-discrimination legislation ==
Indignant and determined not to be deterred, she wrote a letter to Alaska Governor Ernest Gruening and related the incident to him. The prior year, the Governor had seen his anti-discrimination bill be defeated in the Territorial Legislature. Her letter inspired the Governor to have the bill re-introduced in the Territorial Legislature, during which her experience was cited on the floor of the legislature. He answered her letter vowing that no one would again receive that kind of treatment in Alaska. The re-introduced bill passed both houses of the legislature and was signed into law as the Alaska Equal Rights Act of 1945 on February 16, 1945.

== Death and legacy ==
Alberta Schenck married a man named Adams and moved to California. She died on July 6, 2009, in Anaheim of congestive heart failure.

The role Alberta Schenck played in passage of Alaska's 1945 anti-discrimination legislation was part of the Civil Rights Movement.

In 2011, Alberta Schenck Adams was inducted into the Alaska Women's Hall of Fame.

== See also ==
- Elizabeth Peratrovich
- Native American women in politics
