= Henry Roden =

Swiss born American prospector, lawyer and politician

Henry Joseph Roden

5th Attorney General of the Alaska Territory
- In office 1941–1945
- Governor: Ernest Gruening
- Preceded by: James S. Truitt
- Succeeded by: Ralph Julian Rivers

President of the Alaska Senate
- In office January 27, 1941 – January 25, 1943
- Preceded by: Norman R. Walker
- Succeeded by: Orville Cochran

Member of the Alaska Senate from the 4th district
- In office March 3, 1913 – March 1, 1915 Serving with Daniel Sutherland
- Preceded by: Position Established
- Succeeded by: O.P. Gaustad

Member of the Alaska Senate from the 1st district
- In office January 14, 1935 – January 25, 1943 Serving with Norman R. Walker
- Preceded by: Allen Shattuck
- Succeeded by: Arthur P. Walker

Personal details
- Born: Henry Joseph Roden; August 8, 1874 Basel, Switzerland
- Died: June 5, 1966 (aged 91) Seattle, Washington, U.S.
- Party: Democratic; Independent

Henry Joseph Roden (August 8, 1874 – June 5, 1966) was Swiss born American prospector, lawyer and politician who served as Attorney General of the Territory of Alaska as well as a member and subsequently president of the Alaska territorial senate.

== Biography ==
Born in Basel in 1874 Roden arrived in Alaska as part of the Klondike Gold Rush, arriving in Rampart in the summer of 1898.

In 1902 he began independently studying law, eventually passing the Alaska Bar exam in 1906 and served as assistant US Attorney in Fairbanks, assistant US Attorney in Iditarod and as City Attorney of Iditarod.

He was elected to the first Alaska territorial legislature in 1913 and was subsequently re-elected as part of the 12th legislature in 1935 and remained a Senator until the 15th legislature in 1941 when he served as Senate President. In 1941 he became Attorney general for the state of Alaska, a position which he held until 1944, when he stood unsuccessfully as the Democratic candidate for the Alaskan representative to the US Congress.

Throughout this time Roden maintained interests in mining. In 1919 he and others incorporated the Admiralty Alaska Gold Mining Company with himself as president, which controlled a mine in Funter Bay; in 1942 he was still an officer of the mining company, and following the start of the Aleutian Islands campaign and the evacuation of the Aleutian and Pribilof Islands the mine was leased to the US government to house some of the evacuees. As Attorney general in 1943 he inspected the mine and wrote a letter to Governor Ernest Gruening expressing concern about the situation.
