= Fellowship Forum =

The Fellowship Forum was an anti-Catholic publication that was mostly read by white, Protestant fraternalists. Historian Thomas R. Pegram has described the publication as a "Klan allied masonic journal". The link between Masons and the Klan was first announced in the Fellowship Forum. After the Klan hired the Southern Publicity Association to increase the organization's membership in the 1920s, Fellowship Forum readership increased—from 1,000 readers in 1921 to a circulation of over one million by 1927. The paper has been described as "an integral part of the resurgence of the KKK among white Americans in the 1920s."

The first issue of the Fellowship Forum was published on June 24, 1921, by the Independent Publishing Company, in Washington, DC. The founders of the paper, who were both Masons, called it "The World's Greatest Fraternal Newspaper." Its stated mission was to disseminate "religious and patriotic doctrines." When Justice Harlan Stone was nominated to the United States Supreme Court during the Prohibition era the Fellowship Forum wrote that he had a "fine record" and had been "very active in the enforcement of Prohibition laws" as Attorney General.
