= Alaska Statutes =

The Alaska Statutes comprise the statutory law of the U.S. state of Alaska, and consists of the codified legislation of the Alaska Legislature.
