= List of Alaska suffragists =

This is a list of Alaska suffragists, suffrage groups and others associated with the cause of women's suffrage in the U.S. territory, and later state, of Alaska.

== Groups ==
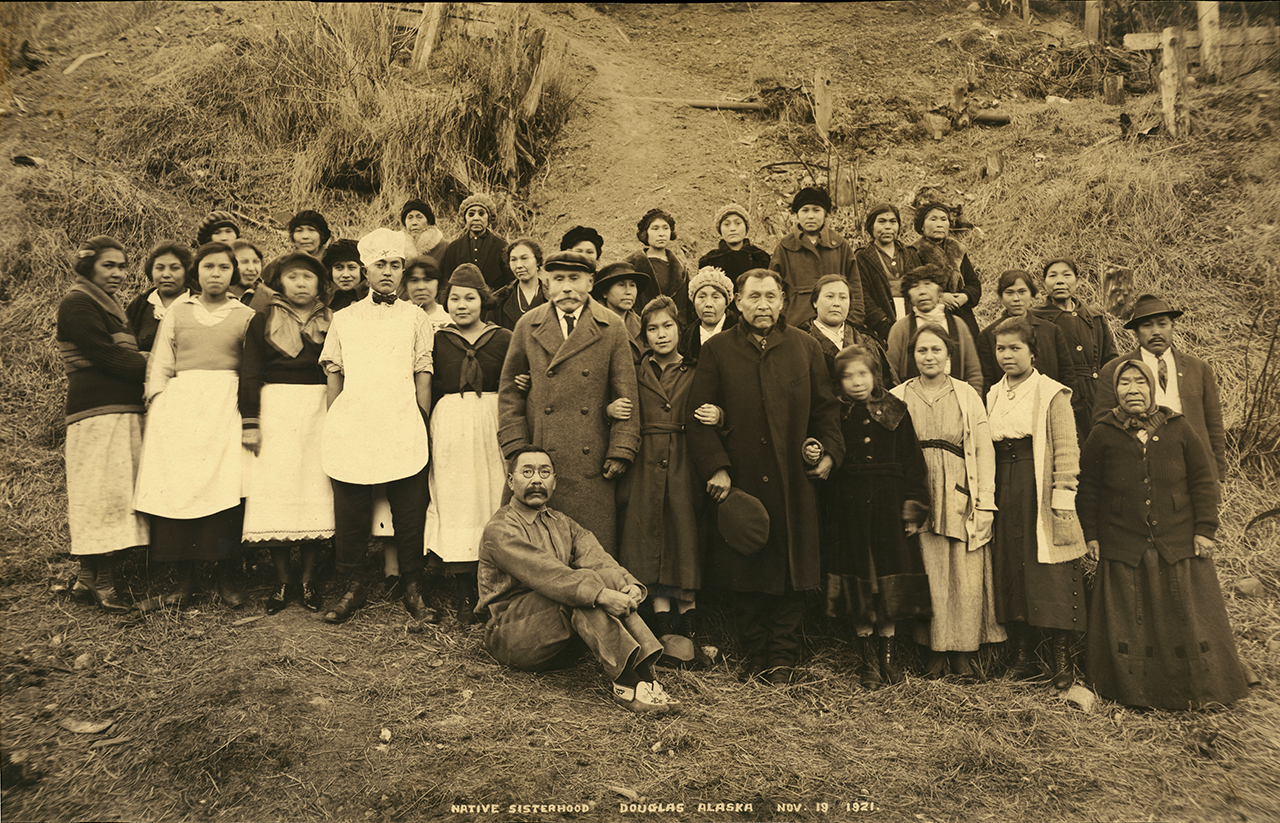
Alaska Native Sisterhood in Douglas, Alaska, November 19, 1921

- Alaska Native Brotherhood, formed in 1912.
- Alaska Native Sisterhood, formed in 1915.
- National American Woman Suffrage Association (NAWSA).
- Women's Christian Temperance Union (WCTU).

== Suffragists and other voting rights advocates ==
- Ada Brownell (Seward).
- Ida E. Green (Seward).
- Margaret Keenan Harrais (Skagway).
- Cornelia Templeton Hatcher (Knik).
- Milo Kelly (Knik).
- Emma Lefevre (Skagway).
- Lena Morrow Lewis (Fairbanks).
- Clara Michener (Ketchikan).
- Francis Turner Pedersen (Seward).
- Harriet Pullen (Skagway).
- Lucy Record Spaeth (Ketchikan).
- Arthur G. Stroup (Sitka).
- Lulu Thompson (Juneau).

=== Indigenous voting rights activists ===
- Tillie Paul (Tlingit).
- William Paul (Tlingit).

== See also ==
- Timeline of women's suffrage in Alaska
- Women's suffrage in Alaska
- Native Americans and women's suffrage in the United States
- Women's suffrage in states of the United States
- Women's suffrage in the United States
