= Women's suffrage in Alaska =

U.S. state gender equality movement

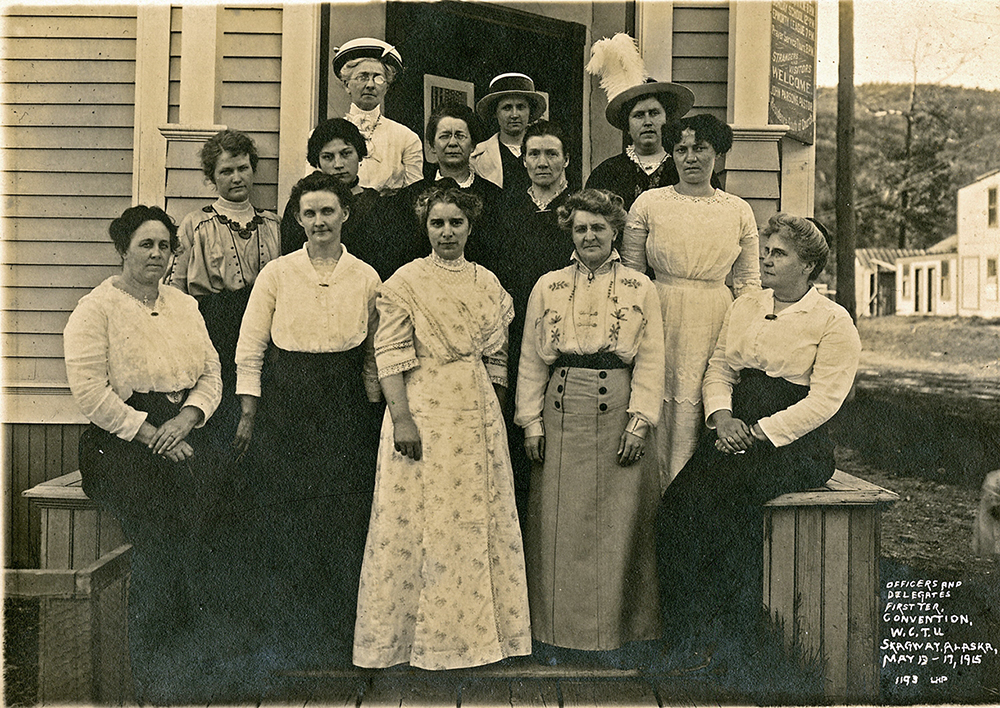
Alaska suffragists c. 1916

Women's suffrage was won fairly easily for non-native women in Alaska in 1913. Prior to becoming a territory, non-native women were able to vote in school board elections. Women's suffrage work took place in the Alaska chapters of the Women's Christian Temperance Union (WCTU). After Alaska was admitted as a territory, the first Territorial Legislature passed a women's suffrage bill in 1913 and was signed into law on March 21. This law only applied to non-native women since Alaska Natives were not considered citizens of the United States. Alaska Natives continued to fight for the right to vote, along with other civil rights throughout the twentieth and twenty-first century.

== Women's suffrage ==
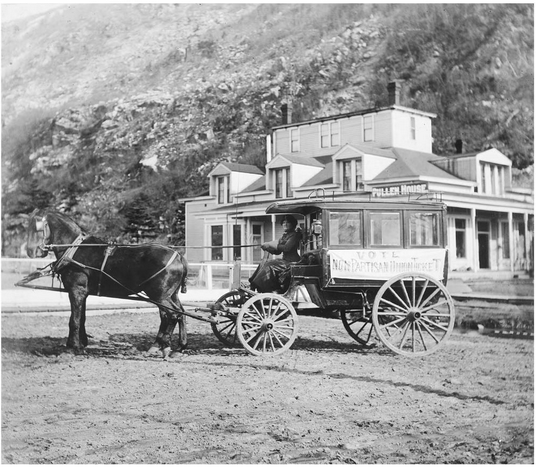
Harriet Pullen and her "Pullen House Bus" in 1914

The United States Congress passed a law in 1904, giving all adult citizens in Alaska the right to vote and women the right to vote in school board elections. Early white women's rights activists were active in the Women's Christian Temperance Union (WCTU) in Territorial Alaska. The Skagway, Alaska WCTU was very active in their own community. Members of the Alaska WCTU eventually felt that to pass successful temperance efforts meant they would need the right to vote. Liquor licenses were voted on and issued on an annual basis in Territorial Alaska since 1908.

One member of the Alaskan chapters of WCTU, Cornelia Templeton Jewett Hatcher, was also a suffragist who advocated for women's right to vote in the territory. In 1912 Hatcher drafted and solicited signatures on a women's suffrage petition to the Territorial Legislature. Lena Morrow Lewis arrived in Alaska in 1912 where she served as an American Socialist Party leader for five years. During this time she advocated for women's suffrage and helped women with voting issues. In Skagway, Alaska, women lobbied congressional delegate, James Wickersham, for women's suffrage. The Western Federation of Miners came out in favor of women's suffrage in Alaska. Overall, the press was also supportive of women's suffrage in the state. The Daily Alaska Dispatch, a Republican newspaper, "actively supported" women's suffrage.

In the United States Congress, Representative Frank W. Mondell included language in an amendment to the Alaskan Territory bill that would allow the territorial legislature to approve women's suffrage without the need for a referendum. One of the territorial senators, Arthur G. Stroup was in contact with the National American Woman Suffrage Association (NAWSA) about introducing a women's suffrage bill for Alaska. Other members of NAWSA lobbied Alaska legislators as soon as they had been elected.

When the Territorial Legislature opened in Juneau in 1913, Representative Milo Kelly of Knik, Alaska presented Hatcher's petition. Stroup's bill was also introduced at the first Territorial Legislature. One member of the House, Charles E. Ingersoll, attempted to stall the bill, but the rest of the House stopped the delay and continued deliberations. While the House was voting, another petition for women's suffrage was on its way to Juneau by steamship. The petition came from three women from Seward, Ada Brownell, Ida E. Green and Francis Turner Pedersen, and had 143 signatures. Both of the petitions and the bill passed by the House were presented to the Senate where it also passed. It was the first bill to pass through both House and Senate in the Alaskan Territory. The women's suffrage bill was signed into law on March 21, 1913. This law did not include Alaskan Natives except under certain circumstances.

After the bill passed, Harriet Pullen used a wagon, called the Pullen House Bus, to help women reach polling locations in Alaska. Pullen supported temperance and her wagon had a sign that read, "Vote Dry and Protect Your Home."

== Alaska Native women and voting ==
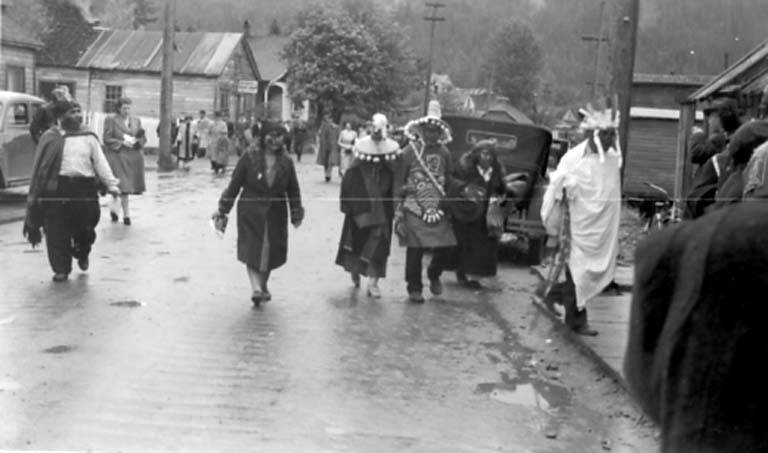
Alaska Natives in Wrangell, Alaska, between 1915 and 1925

While non-native women had largely gained voting rights, Alaska Natives still had an uncertain path to the vote. Some indigenous women were considered citizens through their marriage to white men, but most Alaska Natives were not. The Alaska Native Brotherhood (ANB) was formed in 1912 to support the civil rights of Natives. The Alaska Native Sisterhood (ANS) was formed three years later in 1915. A law passed by the Territorial Legislature allowed Alaskan Natives to vote if they gave up their "tribal customs and traditions." Native women largely were not able to vote after the passage of the Nineteenth Amendment because of questions about their citizenship.

William Paul (Tlingit) fought for indigenous people's right to vote during the 1920s. He organized both literate and illiterate voters in the state. Paul gave illiterate voters a template individuals could place over the ballot and be able to vote in a manner Paul approved of. Tillie Paul (Tlingit) was arrested for helping Charlie Jones (Tlingit) vote since Alaska did not consider them citizens. After winning in court, the case helped set a precedent that Alaska Natives could legally vote. In 1924, the United States Congress passed the Indian Citizenship Act. The next year, however, Alaska passed a literacy test that was meant to suppress the votes of Natives.

Alaska became a segregated state with different areas and rules for non-native and indigenous people. ANB protested the segregation with boycotts. Governor Ernest Gruening felt that an anti-discrimination law was needed. A bill was sent to the territorial legislature in 1943, but was narrowly defeated. Gruening actively recruited Alaska Natives through the ANB and by 1944, Frank Peratrovich (Tlingit) and Andrew Hope (Tlingit) were elected into office. Also that year, Alberta Schenck (Inupiaq) was arrested for resisting segregation in a theater in Nome, Alaska. The publicity surrounding her arrest led to Schenck being elected the Queen of Nome in 1944. Another young activist who also staged a sit in at a theater in Nome was Holger Jorgensen (Inupiaq).

When the Alaska Territorial Legislation opened in 1945, one of the top issues was dealing with civil rights for Native Alaskans. Alaska Natives "turned out in full force" to the hearings. During the proceedings Elizabeth Peratrovich (Tlingit), a president of the ANS testified about how it felt to be subject to segregation. Peratrovich's speech helped turn sentiment towards the bill. After hours of debate, the bill was passed and signed into law on February 16, 1945. The Alaska Equal Rights Act of 1945 ended segregation of Native Alaskans. However, there was still discrimination against Native Alaskans accessing their right to vote.

When Alaska became a state, the new constitution specified a more lenient literacy test. In 1970, the Alaska state legislature adopted women's suffrage and a referendum ratified a constitutional amendment against literacy tests in the state. The Voting Rights Act of 1965 (VRA), modified in 1975, provided additional help for individuals who do not speak English. This affects around 14 census areas in Alaska where individuals must have help in Native Alaskan languages. Into the twenty-first century, many villages in Alaska that have large Alaska Native populations continue to face barriers to voting.

== See also ==
- List of Alaska suffragists
- Timeline of women's suffrage in Alaska
- Women's suffrage in states of the United States
- Women's suffrage in the United States
