= Timeline of women's suffrage in Alaska =

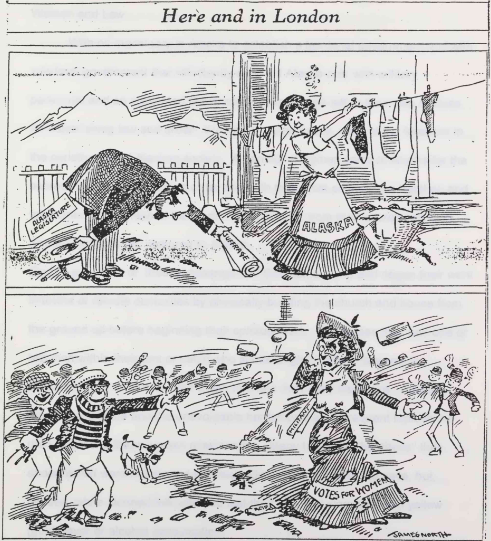
"Here and in London" Alaska women's suffrage, c. 1913 published in the Tacoma Daily Ledger

This is a timeline of women's suffrage in Alaska. Non-native women in Alaska had the right to vote in school board elections starting in 1904. In 1913, the first Territorial Legislature passed the Shoup Suffrage Bill which gave non-native women the right to vote in all elections. Alaska Native women had a longer road fighting for their right to vote. First, they had to be declared citizens of the United States, but even after that happened in 1924, additional barriers were put in place. These included literacy tests and segregation. The Voting Rights Act of 1965 helped remove many barriers that Alaska Natives faced in exercising their right to vote.

== 20th century ==
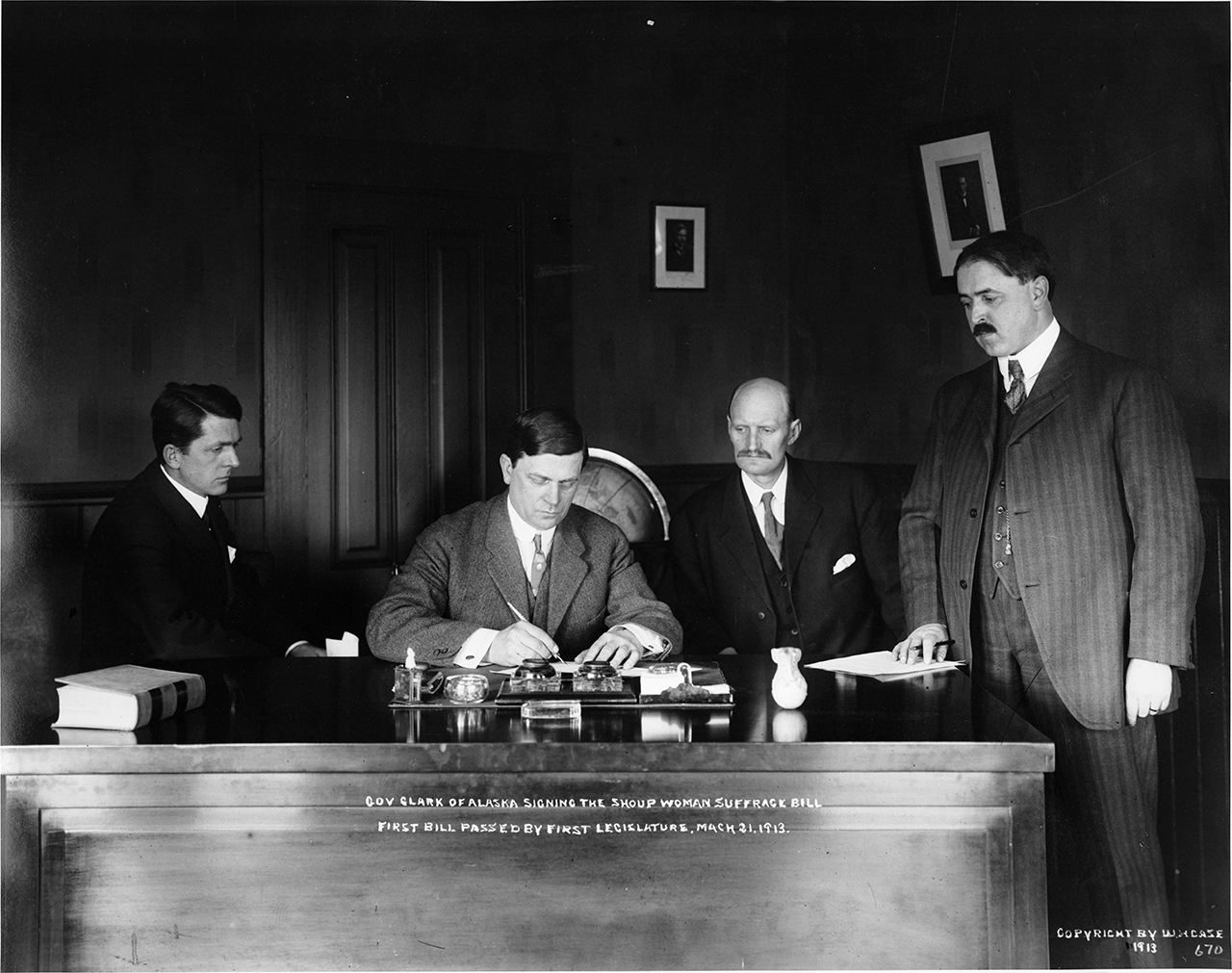
Alfred Shoup, Conrad Freeding, W.W. Shorthill watch Governor Walter E. Clark sign House Bill 2, giving white Alaska women the right to vote

=== 1900s ===
1904

- Alaska women are given the right to vote in school board elections.

=== 1910s ===
1912

- Representative Frank W. Mondell adds an amendment to a bill making Alaska an American Territory that would allow the territorial legislature to legislate equal suffrage for women.
- Cornelia Templeton Hatcher drafts a petition to the territorial legislature of Alaska for women's suffrage.
- Nellie Cashman is the first woman to vote in Alaska.
- The Alaska Native Brotherhood (ANB) is formed.

1913

- The Shoup Woman Suffrage bill is passed in 1913, giving women the right to vote in Alaska if they are considered United States citizens.
- March 21: The Shoup Suffrage bill is signed into law.

1915

- The Alaska Native Sisterhood (ANS) is formed.
- Alaska Natives are allowed to vote if they give up "tribal customs and traditions."

=== 1920s ===
1924

- The Indian Citizenship Act is passed.

1925

- Alaska passes a literacy test to suppress the vote of Alaska Natives.

=== 1940s ===
1943

- Chinese Americans are able to vote after the passage of the Magnuson Act.

1945

- Alaska anti-discrimination law ends segregation of Native Alaskans.

=== 1950s ===
1950

- The Anchorage League of Women Voters (LWV) is formed.

1959

- The new state of Alaska has a more lenient literacy test.

=== 1960s ===
1965

- The Voting Rights Act (VRA) is passed which helps remove many voting barriers to Native Alaskans.

1967

- The statewide LWV is formed.

=== 1970s ===
1970

- Literacy tests are ended in Alaska.

1975

- The VRA is modified to provide voting information in Native languages.

== See also ==
- List of Alaska suffragists
- Women's suffrage in Alaska
- Women's suffrage in states of the United States
- Women's suffrage in the United States
