= Timeline of women's suffrage in New Jersey =

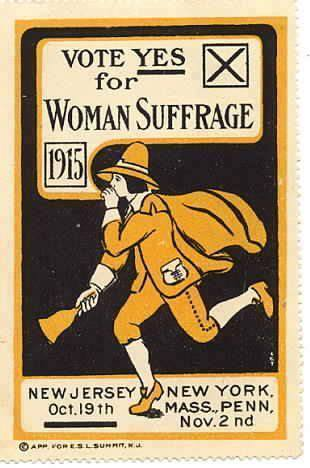
"Vote Yes for Woman Suffrage 1915" Stamp

This is a timeline of women's suffrage in New Jersey. Women and African Americans had the right to vote in New Jersey until the state constitution was changed in 1807, disenfranchising all but white men. Any early suffrage protest was taken by Lucy Stone in 1857 who refused to pay her property taxes because she could not vote. Additional attempts to make women more equal under the law took place in the 1880s and 1890s. There were also several court cases that challenged women's right to vote in the state. Eventually, a voter referendum on a state constitutional suffrage amendment took place in 1915, however the measure was voted down. Activists continued to fight both in the state and to protest in Washington, D.C. as Silent Sentinels. By February 10, 1920, New Jersey ratified the Nineteenth Amendment.

== 18th century ==
=== 1770s ===
1776

- The Constitution of New Jersey allows men and women who meet the property requirement to vote.

=== 1780s ===
1787

- Two women appear on a New Jersey polling list.

=== 1790s ===
1797

- October 18: A poem about women's suffrage is published in the Newark Centinel of Freedom.
- Women in New Jersey vote in much greater numbers after this year.

== 19th century ==
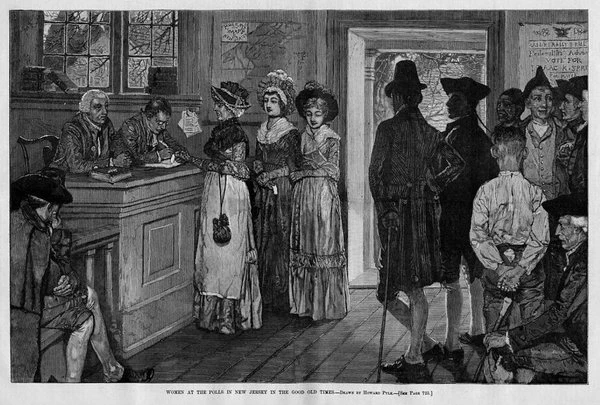
"Women at the Polls in New Jersey in the Good Old Times," engraving by Howard Pyle, appearing in Harper's Weekly in 1880

=== 1800s ===
1802

- African Americans and women vote in Hunterdon County.

1807

- Women lose the right to vote in New Jersey under the claim that this is "election reform."

=== 1820s ===
1824

- It is reported that a few widows voted in Barnsboro.

=== 1840s ===
1844

- June 18: John C. Ten Eyck petitions the New Jersey Constitutional Convention to include women's suffrage in the new constitution.
- The new state constitution disenfranchises women and African Americans explicitly.

=== 1850s ===
1852

- Many New Jersey women attend the Pennsylvania Woman's Convention at West Chester in 1852.

1853

- John Pierpont discusses the early voting rights of women in New Jersey at the Women's Rights Convention in Rochester.

1854

- Henry Lafetra petitions the state legislature to declare women and men equal under the law.

1857

- Lucy Stone refuses to pay the property taxes on her home in Orange, claiming "taxation without representation."
- Lafetra sends in another petition to declare women and men equal under the law.

1858

- Some of Stone's personal possessions are sold to pay her back taxes.

=== 1860s ===
1866

- The Vineland Equal Suffrage Association is formed.

1867

- The New Jersey Woman Suffrage Association (NJWSA) is formed by Stone and Antoinette Brown Blackwell.
- Stone and Blackwell petition the state legislature to remove the words "white male" from the state constitution regarding voting rights.
- Stone testifies in front of a legislative committee in favor of allowing women and Black people to vote.

1868

- March 10: Portia Gage attempts to vote in New Jersey.
- November: Women in New Jersey cast "mock ballots" in Vineland as part of a women's suffrage strategy. There were 172 participants, including four Black women.

=== 1870s ===
1872

- Women in New Jersey participate in protest votes.

1875

- The word "white" is removed from the list of voter requirements in the state constitution.

=== 1880s ===
1880

- November 2: Elizabeth Cady Stanton attempts voting in Tenafly.

1884

- A petition for full equal suffrage is given to the state legislature.
- Therese Walling Seabrook, Henry Blackwell, and Phebe Hanaford are able to win some support for women's suffrage in the state legislature.

1887

- February: A bill for all people, regardless of race or sex, to vote in school meetings is introduced to the state legislature by William Miller Baird.
- Women in New Jersey get the right to vote in school elections.
- The New Jersey Woman's Christian Temperance Union (WCTU) votes to support women's suffrage.
- September: Seabrook and Lillie Devereux Blake encourage women to protest vote in the next election, but it is not known if anyone did.

=== 1890s ===
1890

- NJWSA is reorganized with the help of Mary Dudley Hussey.

1893

- A law passes in New Jersey to allow any freeholder (which could include women) to vote for local road commissioners.
- Women vote in a school meeting that included a tax levy.

1894

- June 11: In Allison v. Blake, women's votes are rule unconstitutional.
- June 13: Women lose the right to vote for school trustees, but can still vote on some school issues after a Supreme Court of New Jersey ruling in Allison v. Blake.
- July 27: Women's votes are rejected during a school election.
- November: The case of Kimball v. Hendee deals with the rejected votes on July 27. The Court decides that women voting is unconstitutional.

1895

- February: Landis v. Ashworth decides an issue of women voting on a tax levy in 1893. Women may vote for everything except school trustees.
- NJWSA and the Jersey City Woman's Club supports the right of women to work as lawyers, helping Mary Philbrook become the first woman admitted to the New Jersey bar. Philbrook becomes legal counsel to NJWSA.

1897

- Efforts to pass a school suffrage bill in the state legislature fail.

1898

- The Orange Political Study Club (OPSC) is created by Minola Graham Sexton.

== 20th century ==
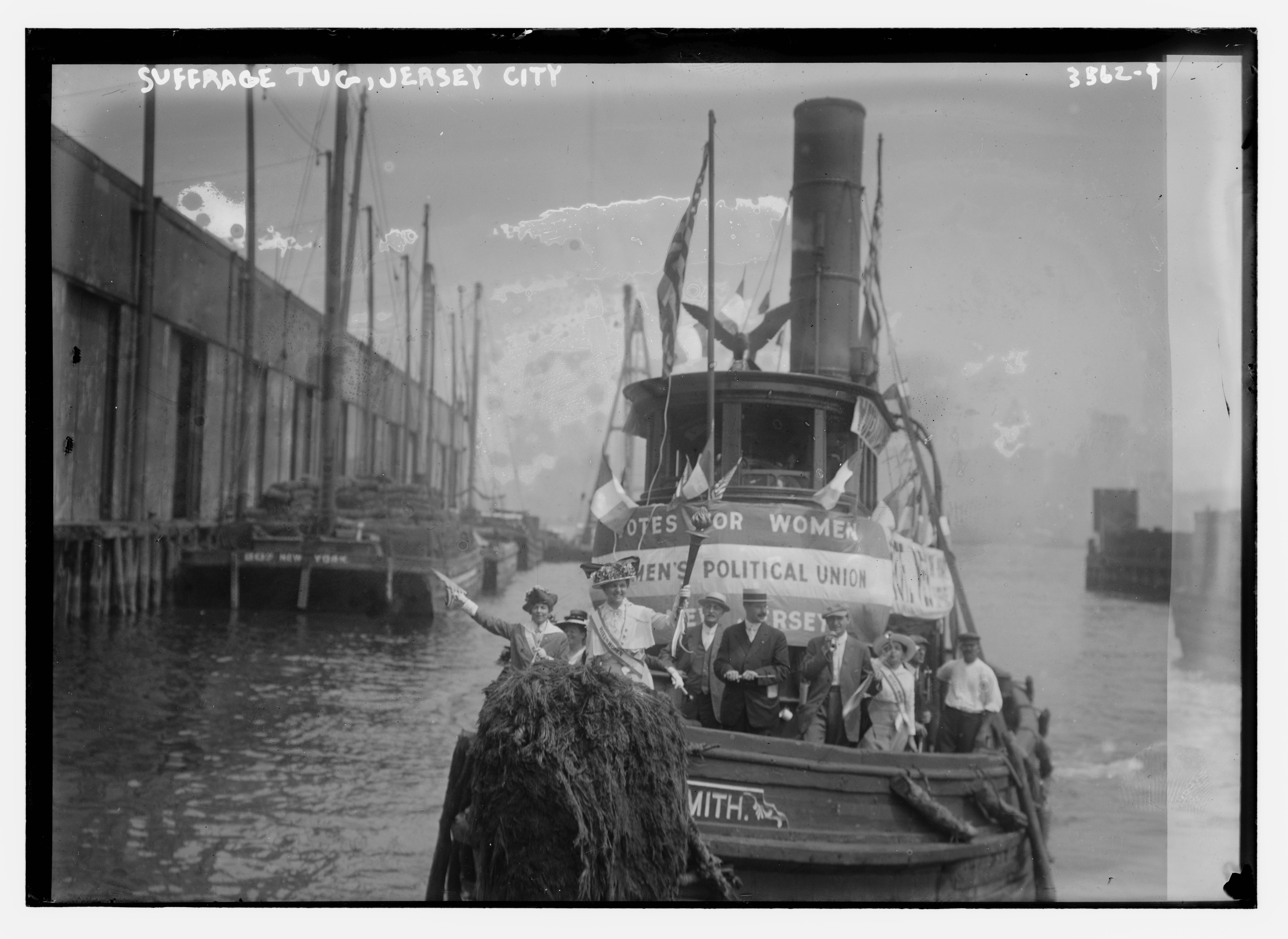
Suffrage tug in Jersey City, New Jersey

=== 1900s ===
1902

- Minola Graham Sexton starts holding suffrage meetings in Ocean Grove.

1904

- Sexton gives speeches at women's clubs and the New Jersey WCTU.

1906

- Suffragists hold a memorial suffrage meeting in Orange, honoring the death of Susan B. Anthony.

1908

- Mina Van Winkle starts the Equality League for Self Supporting Women of New Jersey.

1909

- Emma O. Gantz and Martha Klatschken form the Progressive Woman Suffrage Society.
- Sophia Loebinger gives a speech in Palisades Amusement Park where she discusses the influence of Native Americans on the suffrage movement.

=== 1910s ===
1910

- Equal Franchise Society of New Jersey (EFSNJ) is organized.
- March: The New Jersey Men's League for Woman Suffrage march in Plainfield.
- State suffrage convention is held in Plainfield.
- New Jersey suffragists participate in the New York City suffrage parade organized by Harriot Stanton Blatch.

1911

- November: The state suffrage convention is held in Passaic.
- November: Philbrook goes with Harriet Carpenter to watch her attempt to register to vote. Philbrook files a case to challenge women's exclusion from voting, Carpenter v. Cornish.
- December 4: NJWSA sponsors Emmeline Pankhurst to speak in Newark. Around 2,000 people attend.
- The Equal Justice League is created in Bayonne.
- Between 80 and 100 suffragists from New Jersey participate in the New York City parade.
- EFSNJ begins a campaign to educate women in New Jersey on equal suffrage.
- Several New Jersey suffrage groups come together to form a legislative committee.

1912

- January: State senator, William C. Gebhardt, brings up a women's suffrage amendment in the state legislature.
- March 13: A public hearing on the state suffrage amendment is held with around 600 people attending the hearing.
- April 11: Carpenter v. Cornish is a case heard in the state which argued that the 1844 New Jersey state constitution was wrong to take away women's voting rights. It was decided against the right of women to vote.
- April 14: The New Jersey Association Opposed to Woman Suffrage (NJAOWS) is formed.
- October 25: A women's suffrage parade is held in Newark with around 1,000 men and women marching.
- The Equality League, run by Van Winkle, changes their name to the Women's Political Union of New Jersey (WPUNJ) and affiliate with NJWSA.
- Alice Paul becomes a co-chair of the Congressional Committee of NAWSA.

1913

- January: A women's suffrage resolution is introduced in the state legislature.
- February: A "Votes for Women Special" train leaves Newark to take suffrage supporters to Trenton in order to support an upcoming bill for women's suffrage.
- March: A women's suffrage amendment passes the state legislature.
- March 3: The Woman Suffrage Procession has a delegation from New Jersey.
- April: Paul and Lucy Burns start the Congressional Union for Woman Suffrage (CU).
- June: First state conference of the Women's Political Union.
- August 4: The amendment text had to be published by this date to be valid. It wasn't and that invalidated the bill.
- November: State suffrage convention is held in Newark.
- November: 73 New Jersey delegates attempt to meet with President Woodrow Wilson about women's suffrage. Eventually, they marched in without an invitation and spoke to President Wilson who talked about starting a Suffrage Committee in the House of Representatives.

1914

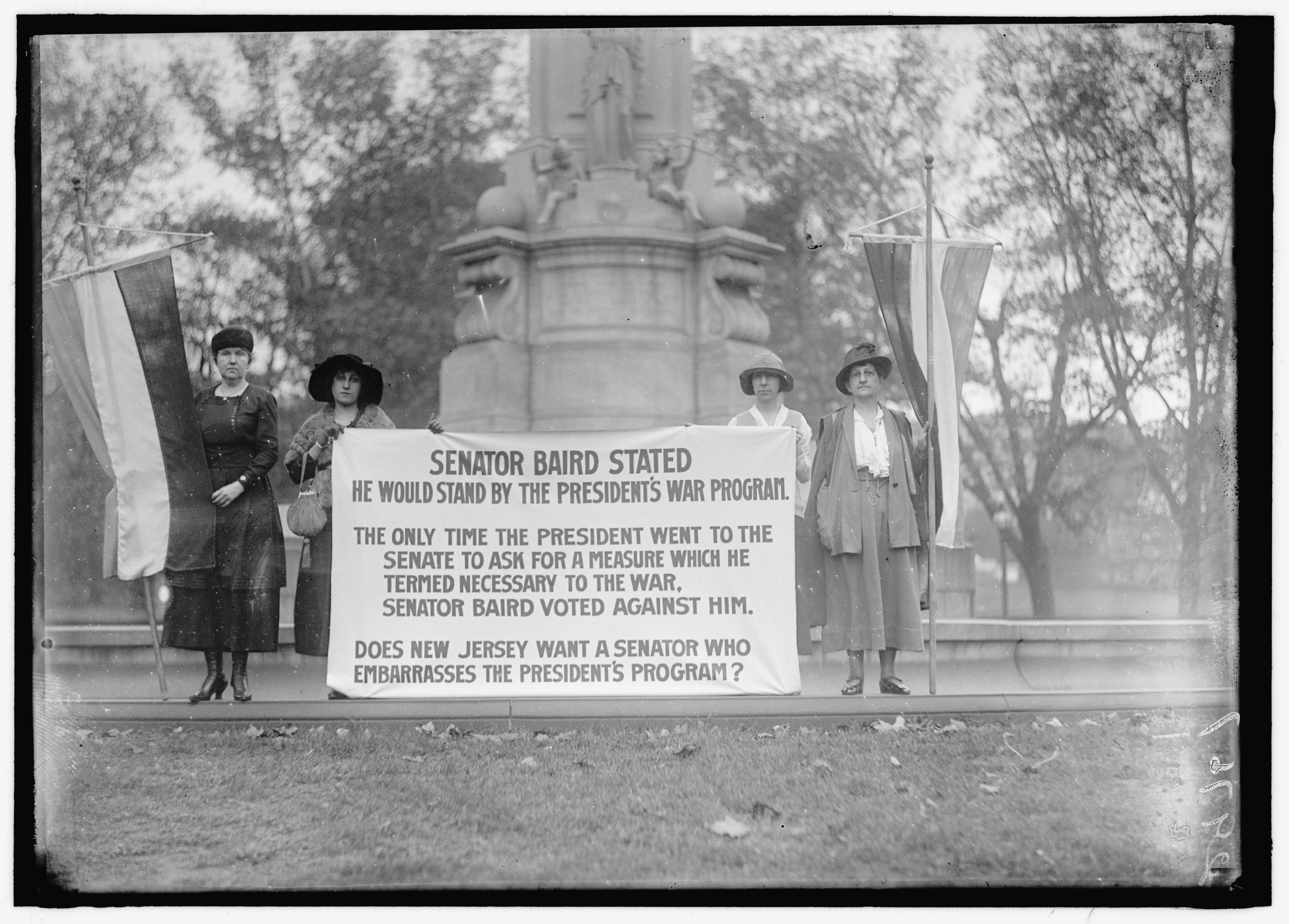
Suffragists from the National Woman's Party call out Senator Baird

- April: NJWSA headquarters are moved to Plainfield.
- A women's suffrage amendment bill passes in the state legislature, but needs to pass one more time.

1915

- May 6: A women's suffrage bill passes and is ready to go out to voter referendum.
- August 7: The Suffrage Torch is handed to New Jersey activists on the tugboat, A.W. Smith, in the middle of the Hudson River.
- August 13: NJWSA hosts an event in Orange to celebrate Stone and her tax protest.
- October: Mary Church Terrell campaigns in New Jersey, urging Black men to support women's right to vote.
- October 19: The women's suffrage amendment is defeated.
- December 1: The New Jersey chapter of the Congressional Union for Woman Suffrage is formed with Alison Turnbull Hopkins as president.

1916

- January: State suffrage convention held in Elizabeth.
- February: A presidential suffrage bill goes to the state legislature, but does not pass.
- June: Lillian Feickert and others represent New Jersey suffragists at the National Republican Convention in Chicago.
- September: NAWSA holds their annual convention in Atlantic City.
- November: NJWSA holds a convention in Jersey City.

1917

- February: A state suffrage amendment is making its way successfully through the state legislature.
- A presidential suffrage bill fails in the state legislature.
- The New Jersey State Federation of Women's Clubs (NJSFWC) endorses women's suffrage officially.
- March: The New Jersey CU changes their name to the National Woman's Party (NWP) New Jersey branch. NWP of New Jersey members start to picket the White House.
- July: The WPU of New Jersey disbands and members join the NJWSA.
- November: The annual state suffrage convention is held in Trenton. The State Federation of Colored Women's Clubs is accepted as an affiliate of the NJWSA.

1919

- February 10: New Jersey Senator David Baird Sr. blocks the passage of the federal suffrage amendment.
- April 23: The NJWSA celebrates the ratification and transforms into the League of Women Voters of New Jersey.
- May: The annual state suffrage convention is held in Atlantic City.
- December: The Men's Council for Ratification is organized.

=== 1920s ===
1920

- January: The state legislature considers ratifying the federal suffrage amendment.
- January 27: A mass meeting attended by 1,200 women and "most of the Legislature" is held in Trenton.
- February 10: The New Jersey legislature ratifies the Nineteenth Amendment.
- April 23: The NJWSA transitions into the League of Women Voters of New Jersey.

== See also ==
- List of New Jersey suffragists
- Women's suffrage in New Jersey
- Women's suffrage in states of the United States
- Women's suffrage in the United States
