= Native Americans and women's suffrage in the United States =

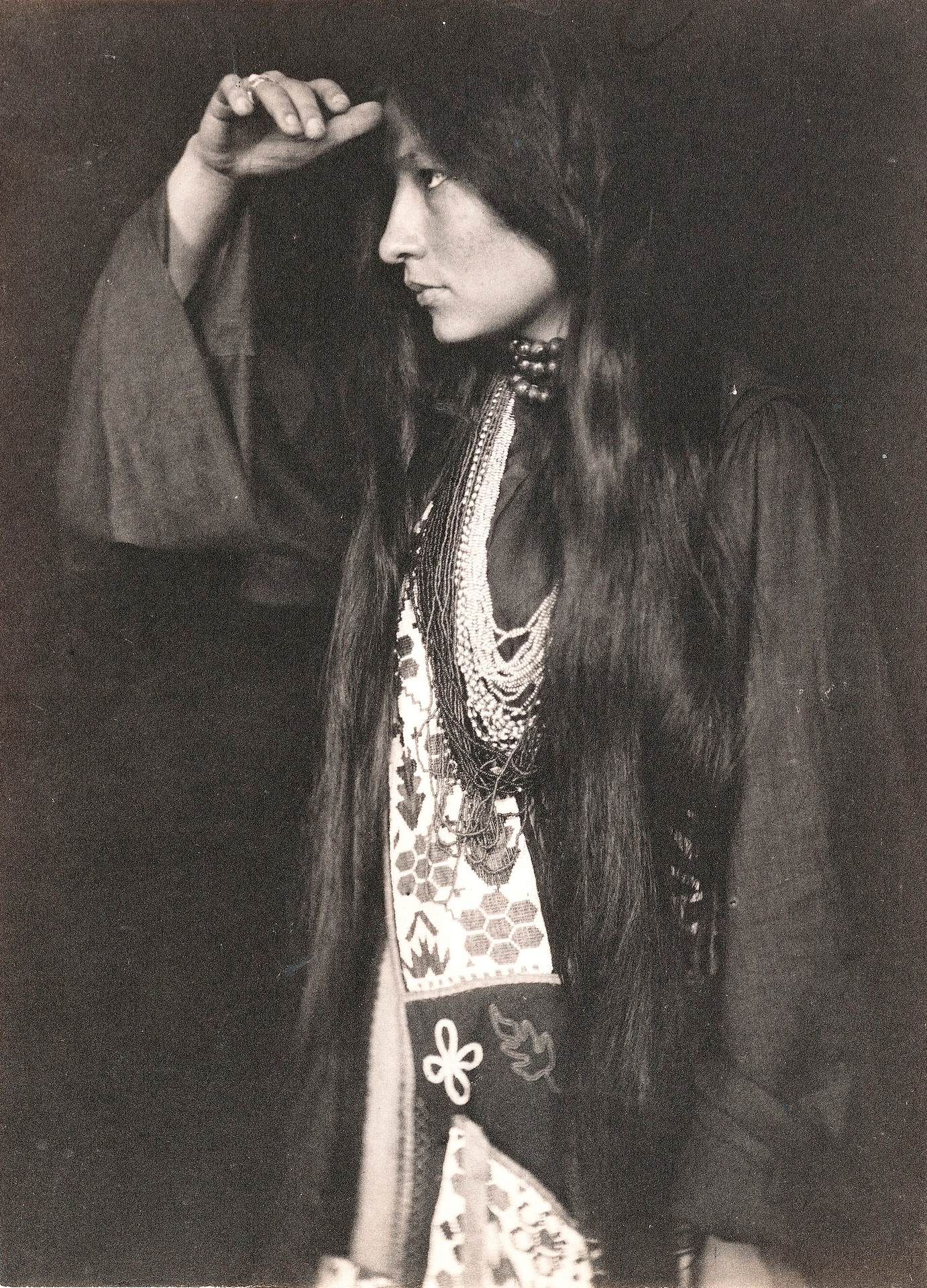
Suffragist and activist, Zitkala-Sa (Yankton Sioux)

Native American women influenced early women's suffrage activists in the United States. The Iroquois nations, which had an egalitarian society, were visited by early feminists and suffragists, such as Lydia Maria Child, Matilda Joslyn Gage, Lucretia Mott, and Elizabeth Cady Stanton. These women discussed how Native American women had authority in their own cultures at various feminist conventions and also in the news. Native American women became a symbol for some suffrage activists. However, other white suffragists actively excluded Native American people from the movement. When the Nineteenth Amendment was passed in 1920, suffragist Zitkala-Sa (Yankton Sioux), commented that Native Americans still had more work to do in order to vote. It was not until 1924 that many Native Americans could vote under the Indian Citizenship Act. In many states, there were additional barriers to Native American voting rights.

== Influences on women's suffrage movement ==
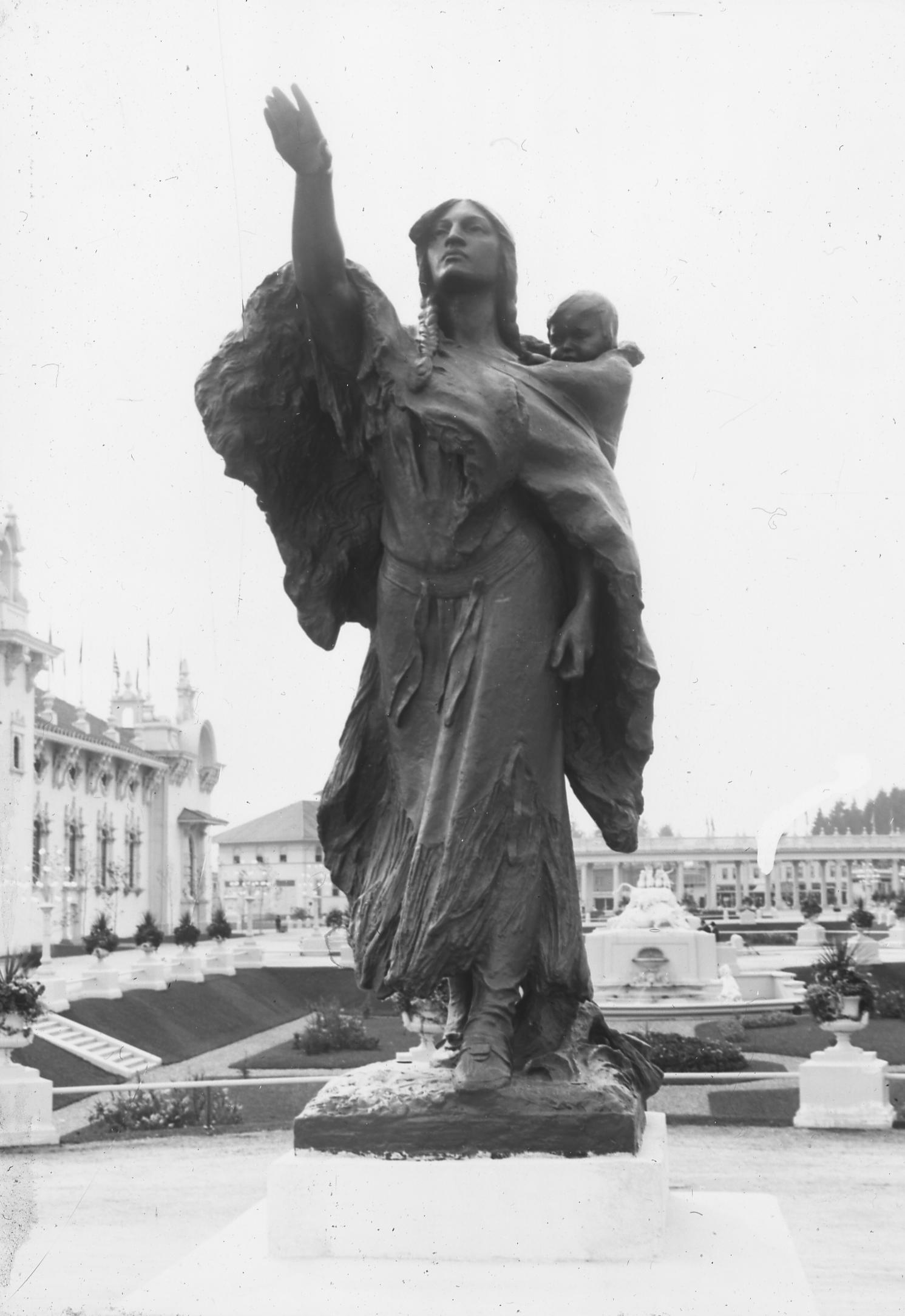
Sacajawea (Lemhi Shoshone) statue in Portland

Early feminist movements in the United States were influenced by Native women, especially Iroquois women. In 1848, Lucretia Mott and her husband visited the Seneca people where she was able to see women living in a more equal society than in her own. When Mott visited friends in New York to plan the Seneca Falls Convention, she shared the stories about the Seneca's more equal treatment of women and their participatory role in tribal government. Iroquois women headed the family structures and both nominated and monitored the work of leaders in their communities. Mott also saw women in these communities work towards greater independence in their own lives.

Matilda Joslyn Gage was also influenced by the structure of society in the Iroquois. Gage believed that Native societies lived in a way that was a model for creating a lasting peace in the world. She wrote articles in the New York Evening Post praising Native cultures like the Iroquois for the contributions of women to their society and their ability to make important decisions for the community. Lydia Maria Child also saw the social structure of Native Americans as "an alternative to patriarchy," and Elizabeth Cady Stanton referenced the culture of the Iroquois as being "matriarchal."

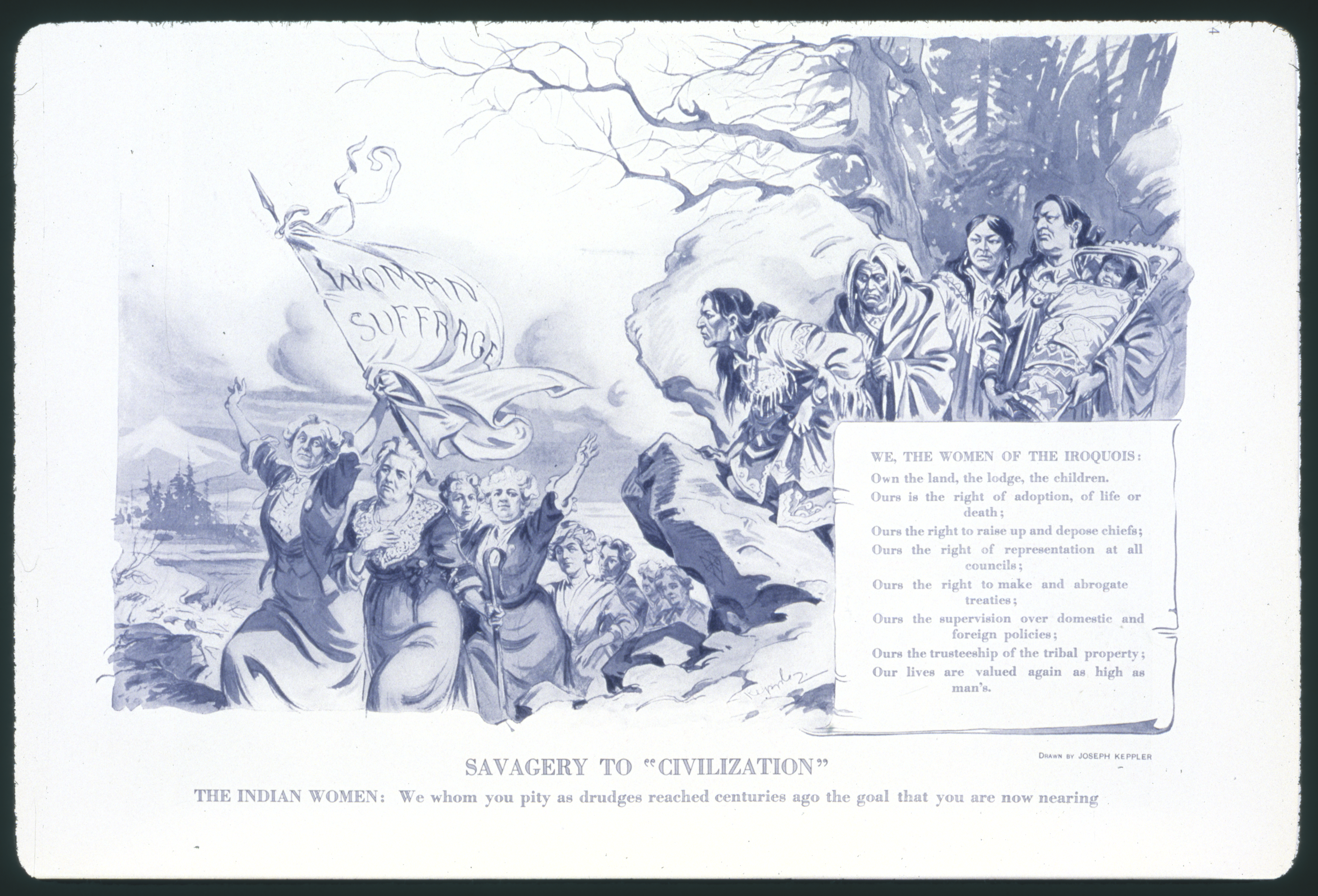
Savagery to "Civilization" – drawn by Joseph Keppler, 1914

Bear-clan mother of the Mohawk Nation, Louise McDonald Herne, stated that it was Native women who "showed white women what freedom and liberty really looked like." Alice Fletcher shared stories about the equal rights of women in Native American cultures at the International Council of Women in 1888. At the National Council of Women in 1891, Stanton again brought up the authority women held in Iroquois culture.

Chair of the Oregon Equal Suffrage Association (OESA), Eva Marie Dye, worked to get Sacagawea (Lemhi Shoshone) recognized as a national hero. Dye's work at creating a statue in Sacagawea's honor was central to much of the suffrage work in Oregon. The National American Women Suffrage Association (NAWSA) held its national convention at the unveiling of the statue in Portland in 1905.

In August 1909 suffragist Sophia Loebinger brought three Iroquois people to her speech at Palisades Amusement Park. She said, "I am reminded that many years ago the Iroquois tribes were ruled by women. They had their council of matrons and that is why their early government was so powerful."

It was advertised that "Dawn Mist" and friends would march with suffragists in the Woman Suffrage Procession, on March 3, 1913, but Dawn Mist was not a real person. Instead, the Great Northern Railway had hired Native American women to perform as Dawn Mist, who acted as a publicity stunt for the Railroad company.

== Native American suffragists ==
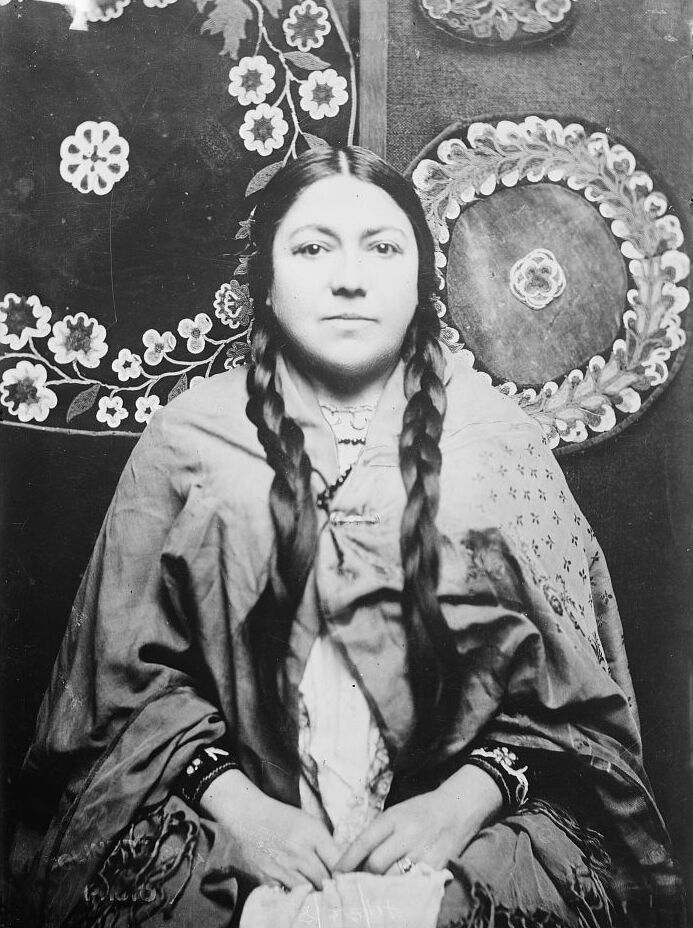
Suffragist Marie L. Baldwin (Métis Turtle Mountain Band of Chippewa Indians)

Cayuga physician, Peter Wilson, in 1866 urged members of the New York Historical Society to support women's right to vote.

In Oklahoma, Native Americans and non-native suffragists met in 1904 to begin working with one another. The Oklahoma Woman Suffrage Association (OWSA) reached out to Chickasaw people in their own language, encouraging them to support women's suffrage.

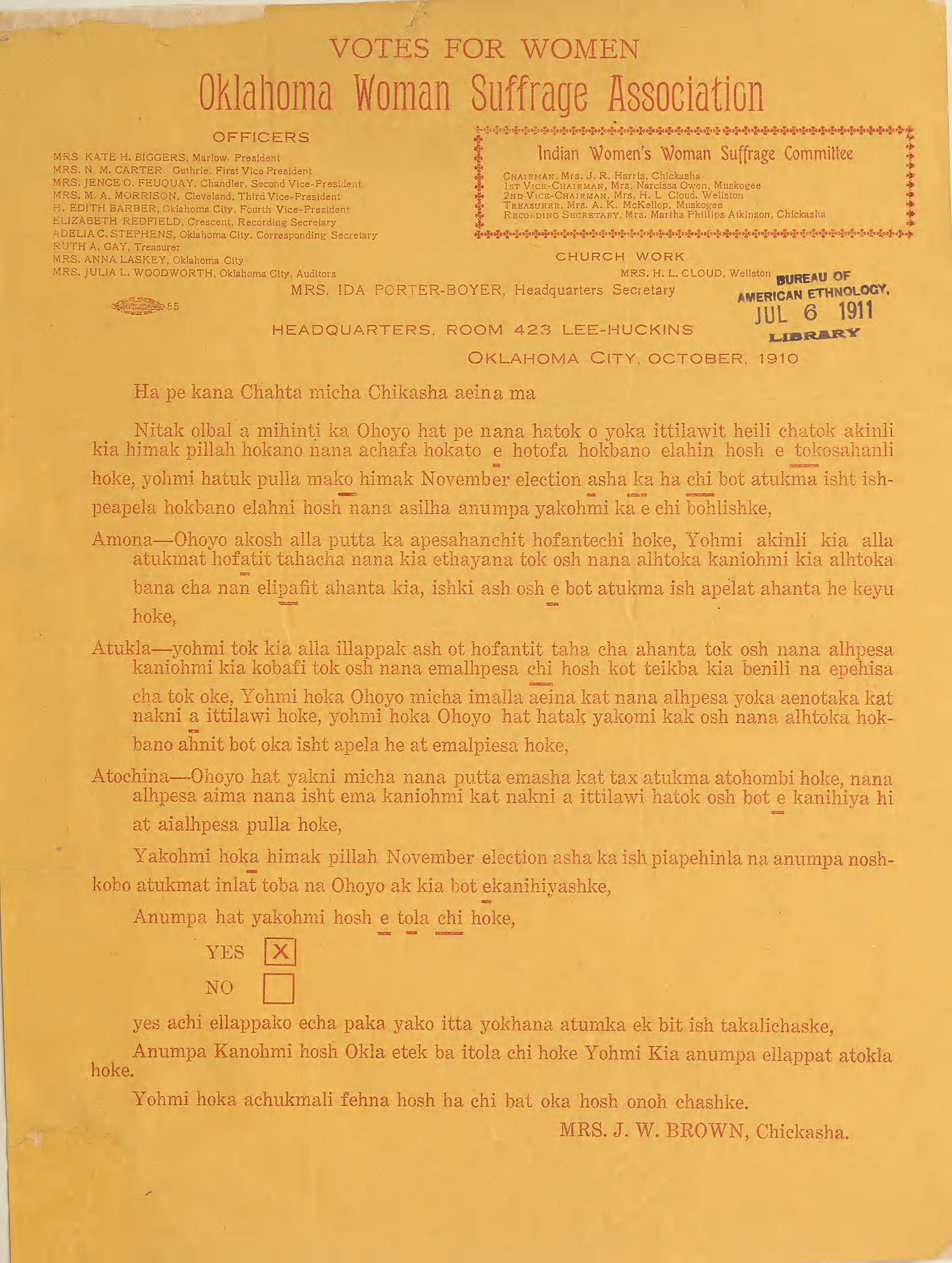
Ha pe kana Chahta micha Chikasha aeina ma, 1910

Marie Louise Bottineau Baldwin (Métis Turtle Mountain Band of Chippewa Indians) participated in a 1913 suffrage parade in Washington, choosing not to create a float using stereotypical images of Native women, but instead marching as "modern women." Baldwin also marched in the 1913 Woman Suffrage Procession in Washington, D.C.

Native American women participated in suffrage demonstrations during the South Dakota state fair held in Huron.

After the 19th Amendment was ratified on August 18, 1920, Zitkala-Sa (Yankton Sioux) reminded white women that Native American women still were not able to legally vote. Laura Cornelius Kellogg (Oneida) pointed out that white women had finally achieved what Native American women already possessed in their tribal communities. Zitkala-Sa lobbied the United States Congress to allow suffrage for Native American people in 1924.

Lucy Nicolar Poolaw (Penobscot) and her sister, Florence Shay (Penobscot), fought for the right of Native Americans living on reservations in Maine to vote. In 1955, Poolaw became the first Native American living on a reservation to vote in Maine.

== Voting rights ==
Alaska's Territorial Legislature provided the right to vote to Alaska Natives, in 1915, as long as they gave up their tribal customs and traditions.

In 1924, Native Americans were recognized as United States citizens through the Snyder Act. However, many states started extending policies designed to disenfranchise Black voters on Native American voters.

Arizona and New Mexico did not allow Native Americans to vote until 1948. Native Americans living on reservations in Maine could not vote until 1954. Utah allowed Indigenous people to vote in 1957. When the Voting Rights Act of 1965 was passed, Native Americans had better access to voting rights, though there were still unique challenges that Native people faced.

== Exclusion ==
Many suffrage groups did not work on reaching out to Native American women. Some white suffragists like Carrie Chapman Catt felt that white women should get the right to vote before Native women could get equal suffrage. Anna Howard Shaw also believed that Native Americans did not deserve to vote. She spoke out against giving the vote to Native people in South Dakota during the 1890s.

== See also ==
- Native American civil rights
- Native American women in politics
- Women's suffrage in the United States
- Women's suffrage in Alaska
- Women's suffrage in Hawaii
