= William Paul (attorney) =

American politician

William Lewis Paul
- Shgúndi

Personal details
- Born: May 7, 1885 Tongass Village, District of Alaska, U.S.
- Died: March 4, 1977 (aged 91) Seattle, Washington, U.S.
- Party: Republican
- Spouse: Frances Paul
- Children: 3
- Parent(s): Louis Francis Paul; Tillie Paul
- Education: Whitworth University (BA)

William Lewis Paul (May 7, 1885 – March 4, 1977) was an American attorney, legislator, and political activist from the Tlingit Nation in Southeast Alaska. He was known as a leader in the Alaska Native Brotherhood, and became the first Native attorney and first Native legislator in Alaskan history.

== Early life ==
William Lewis Paul was born in Tongass Village in Southeast Alaska, the second child of Louis Francis Paul (a.k.a. Pyreau) and Tillie Paul, a Tlingit couple with Scots and French ancestry as well. William's Tlingit name was Shgúndi (or Shgwíndi in the southern Tlingit dialects) and he was a member of the Raven moiety in the Teeyhittaan clan. Tillie Paul was a teacher with Sheldon Jackson's Presbyterian mission among the Tlingit, later Sheldon Jackson College. William and his brothers all also attended the Carlisle Indian Industrial School in Carlisle, Pennsylvania.

== Activism and career ==
William and his brother, Louis Paul (1887–1956), are considered foundational members of the Alaska Native Brotherhood (ANB). In the 1920s, they extended its presence to every Native village in Southeast Alaska. The organization pressed for voting rights, desegregation, and social services, as well as advancing the first Tlingit and Haida land claims in Alaska. William Paul served several times as the ANB's Grand President and Grand Secretary.

William Paul was the first Alaska Native to become an attorney, the first to be elected to Alaska Territorial House of Representatives, and the first to serve as an officer in the federal Bureau of Indian Affairs. He helped draft the legislation to adopt Alaska's flag in 1927. He played a major role in the Alaska Native Claims Settlement Act (ANCSA) of 1971.

His first run for the House in 1922/1923 was challenged legally and became an ultimately successful test case on citizenship rights of Indians to vote and hold office. Paul was defeated in his third run for the seat, in 1928, partly because of accusations that he had received payments from the salmon canning industry that he had vilified repeatedly in print.

He ran unsuccessfully for the office of territorial attorney general in 1932.

In the 1950s Paul brought an important land claims test case, Tee-Hit-Ton vs. U.S., on behalf of his own Tlingit clan, which was unsuccessful but which laid the groundwork for the later ANCSA.

=== Death ===
William Paul died in Seattle, Washington, on March 4, 1977.

== Sources ==
- Drucker, Philip (1958) The Native Brotherhoods: Modern Intertribal Organizations on the Northwest Coast. (Bureau of American Ethnology Bulletin no. 168.) Washington, D.C.: Government Printing Office.
- Haycox, Stephen W. (1986) "William Paul, Sr., and the Alaska Voters' Literacy Act of 1925." Alaska History, vol. 2, pp. 17–37.
- Haycox, Stephen W. (1992) "Tee-Hit-Ton and Alaska Native Rights." In: Law for the Elephant, Law for the Beaver: Essays in the Legal History of the North American West, ed. by John McLaren, Hamar Foster, and Chester Orloff. Regina, Saskatchewan: Canadian Plains Research Center, University of Regina.
- Haycox, Stephen (1994) Biography of William Lewis Paul in: Haa Kusteeyí, Our Culture: Tlingit Life Stories, ed. by Nora Marks Dauenhauer and Richard Dauenhauer, pp. 503–524. (Classics of Tlingit Oral Literature, vol. 3.) Seattle: University of Washington Press.
- Mitchell, Donald Craig (2003) Sold American: The Story of Alaska Natives and Their Land, 1867-1959 (Chapter Five: William Paul and the Alaska Native Brotherhood), University of Alaska Press.
- Paul, William L., Sr. (1971) "The Real Story of the Lincoln Totem." Alaska Journal, summer 1971, pp. 2–16.
- Philp, Kenneth (1981) "The New Deal and Alaska Natives, 1936-1945." Pacific Historical Review, Fall 1981, pp. 309–329.
