= Tillie Paul =

Tlingit translator, civil rights advocate and educator

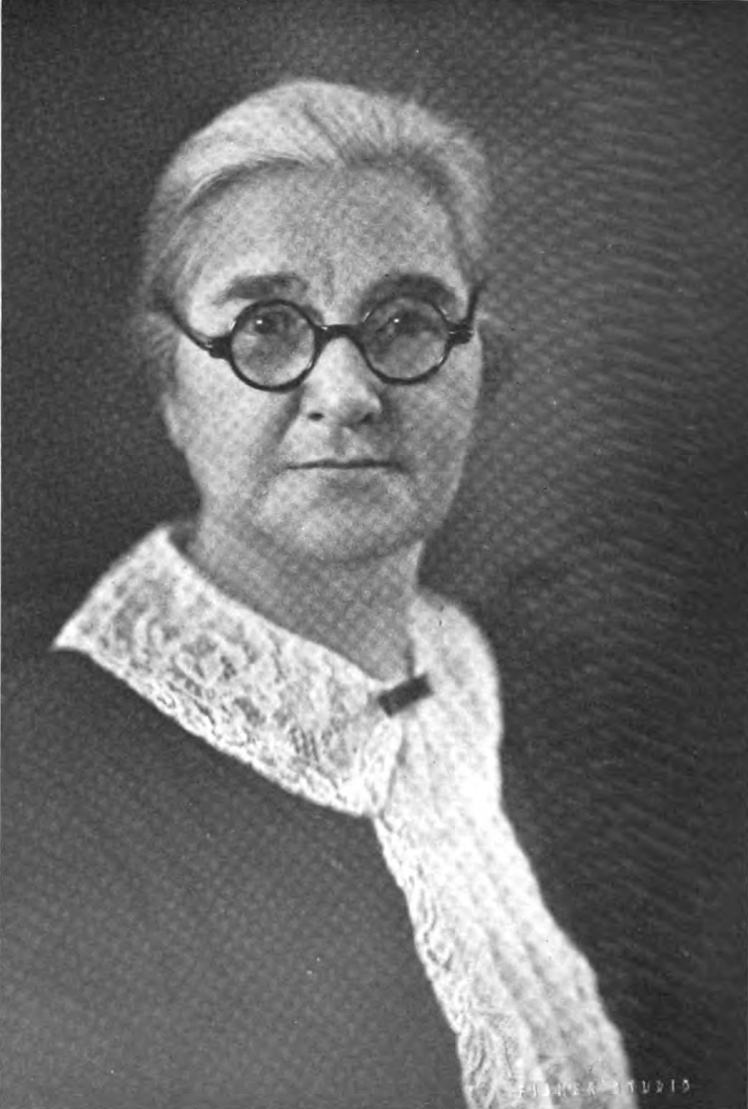
Tillie Paul in 1931

Matilda Kinnon "Tillie"' Paul Tamaree (January 18, 1863 – August 20, 1952) was a Tlingit translator, civil rights advocate, educator, and Presbyterian church elder.

== Early life and education ==
Matilda Kinnon was born in Victoria, British Columbia, the younger daughter of a Tlingit mother named Kut-Xoox, and a Scottish father named James Kinnon, who was employed by the Hudson's Bay Company. When her mother fell ill with tuberculosis, she arranged to bring Tillie and her sister north to be raised by Tlingit relatives. Aided by a member of her Tlingit clan, Kut-Xoox traveled by canoe with her two daughters along the Inside Passage, a journey of 600 miles. After her mother's death, young Tillie was raised by a maternal aunt, Xoon-sel-ut, and her uncle, Chief Snook of the Naanya.aayi, a clan of the Stikeen-quann, near Wrangell, Alaska. Her adoptive family gave her the name Katliyud, soon shortened to "Kah-tah-ah."

Tillie lived in Wrangell until she was 12 years old, when she received a marriage proposal from a Christian Tsimishian chief, Abraham Lincoln. Her uncle consented to the marriage, but Tillie was ambivalent. They arranged that she would travel south to Lincoln's home in Prince Rupert, British Columbia with the understanding that no marriage would take place against her will. After her decision not to marry, when she was no longer under the care of the Tsimishian, she went to live with a Methodist minister and his wife, missionaries at Port Simpson, British Columbia. There, she relearned English and was schooled in Christian worship.

Her family arranged for her return to Wrangell and she was admitted to Amanda McFarland's Presbyterian Home and School for Girls, where she started using the name "Tillie Kinnon."

== Teaching and missionary work ==
While at the McFarland School, Tillie worked as an interpreter for clergyman S. Hall Young in and around Wrangell. She married Louis Francis Paul and in 1882 the two became the first Native couple to be commissioned by the Presbyterian Board of Home Missions to found a new missionary school. Located in Klukwan, Alaska, the school served 64 men and women; Tillie and her husband visited homes three times a week, sharing just twelve textbooks among their students. The couple opened a second school in the Tongass region of Alaska, where Paul's family lived. Paul died in 1886, presumably drowned while scouting for a new school location. However, a contemporary biographer of Tillie Paul's, Mary Lee Davis, suggests that his death was a suspicious one.

Paul's death left Tillie with three young sons to care for on her own. She moved to Sitka, Alaska to work at Sitka Industrial Training School, invited by Sheldon Jackson, a missionary and the General Agent of Education for the Alaskan Territory. There, she performed a range of tasks, acting as an interpreter, supervising sewing classes, serving as a nurse in the boy's hospital ward, and eventually becoming matron of the girl's dormitory.

During her years in Sitka, she worked with a fellow teacher, Fanny Willard, to create a writing system for Tlingit language and together they compiled a Tlingit dictionary. She published several articles about Tlingit culture in the Presbyterian newspaper, The North Star and lectured on Tlingit culture in Sitka as a member of the Society of Alaskan Natural History and Ethnology. Tillie also learned to play the organ, becoming proficient enough to accompany school and church events. Some of her translated hymns and prayers are still in use among Tlingit Christians today.

Tillie traveled on behalf of the Presbyterian Church, attending its General Assembly in New York City at least twice. In 1902, she was invited to address the Assembly on the subject of women's role in the church.

In 1931, Tillie Paul was the first woman ordained as an elder in the Alaska Northwest Synod of the Presbyterian Church, in the first year that Presbyterian women could be so ordained.

== Civil rights advocacy ==
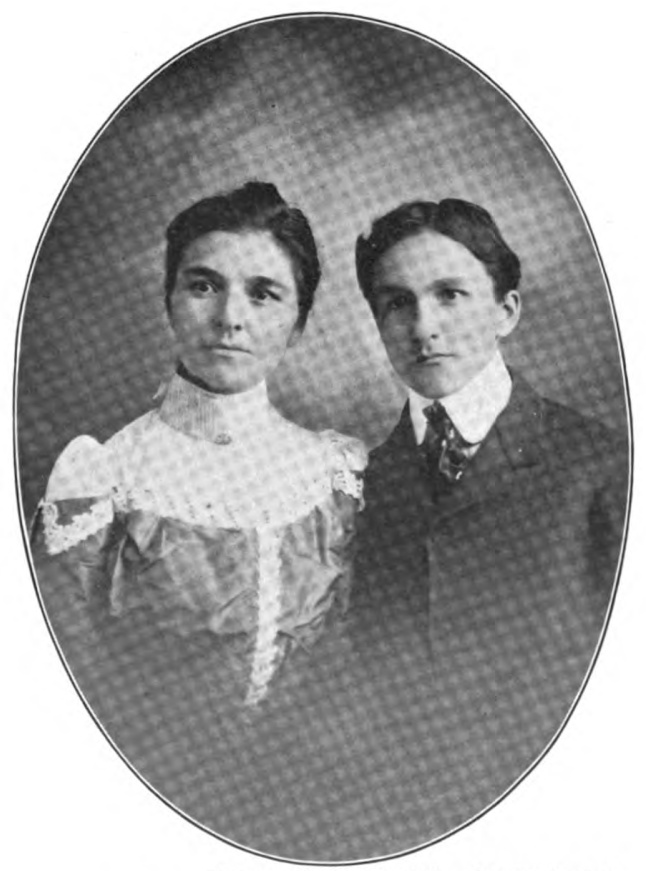
Tillie Paul and her son William

In 1905, Tillie founded the New Covenant Legion, a Christian temperance organization intended to reach Native communities considered especially at risk from alcohol abuse, with George Beck, a student at the Sitka school. The New Covenant Legion in turn became the Alaska Native Brotherhood (ANB) and Alaska Native Sisterhood, the first advocacy organizations for Alaska Native rights. Tillie's sons, William Paul and Louis Paul, were leaders in the ANB as were many of the students Tillie taught at the Sitka school. While her sons are generally given credit for transforming the ANB from a service organization to a political one, Tillie's influence in shaping these leaders was recognized by her contemporaries.

In November 1922, Tillie assisted a Tlingit relative, Charlie Jones, to vote, after he was refused by election officials in Wrangell. Both were charged with felonies: Charlie Jones for "falsely swearing to be a citizen" and voting illegally and Tillie for aiding and abetting him. Her son William, by this time an attorney, defended them both at a trial that took place in Ketchikan, Alaska in 1923. The case hinged on the definition of Native citizenship, which, until 1915, had been determined by the Dawes Act of 1887. That act required Native people to sever tribal ties in order to be recognized as citizens. By 1915, the Alaska Territory had passed the Alaska Citizenship Act. It only recognized Native people as citizens under strict conditions, including the endorsement of at least five white citizens, certain testing requirements, as well as proof that they had "adopted the habits of civilization." William Paul argued that Jones fulfilled the requirements of citizenship under Dawes, insofar as he owned a house, paid taxes, made charitable contributions, and, generally "lived like a white person." Judge Thomas Reed ruled that Dawes preempted the 1915 Citizenship Act. Effectively, this meant that the territorial government could not add procedures such as endorsement by white citizens, testing, or obtaining a certificate of citizenship if the requirements for citizenship under Dawes were met. Tillie Paul Tamaree and Charlie Jones were acquitted.

In his ruling, Judge Reed wrote that "if you find that the defendant Charley (sic) Jones was born within the limits of the United States, then you must conclude that the said Charley Jones was born under and within the terms of the 1st Section of the 14th Amendment." In 1924, the Indian Citizenship Act conferred citizenship on all Native Americans born within the United States and its territories, extending the franchise, but not completely eradicating further attempts to limit Native Americans' right to vote.

== Personal life and legacy ==
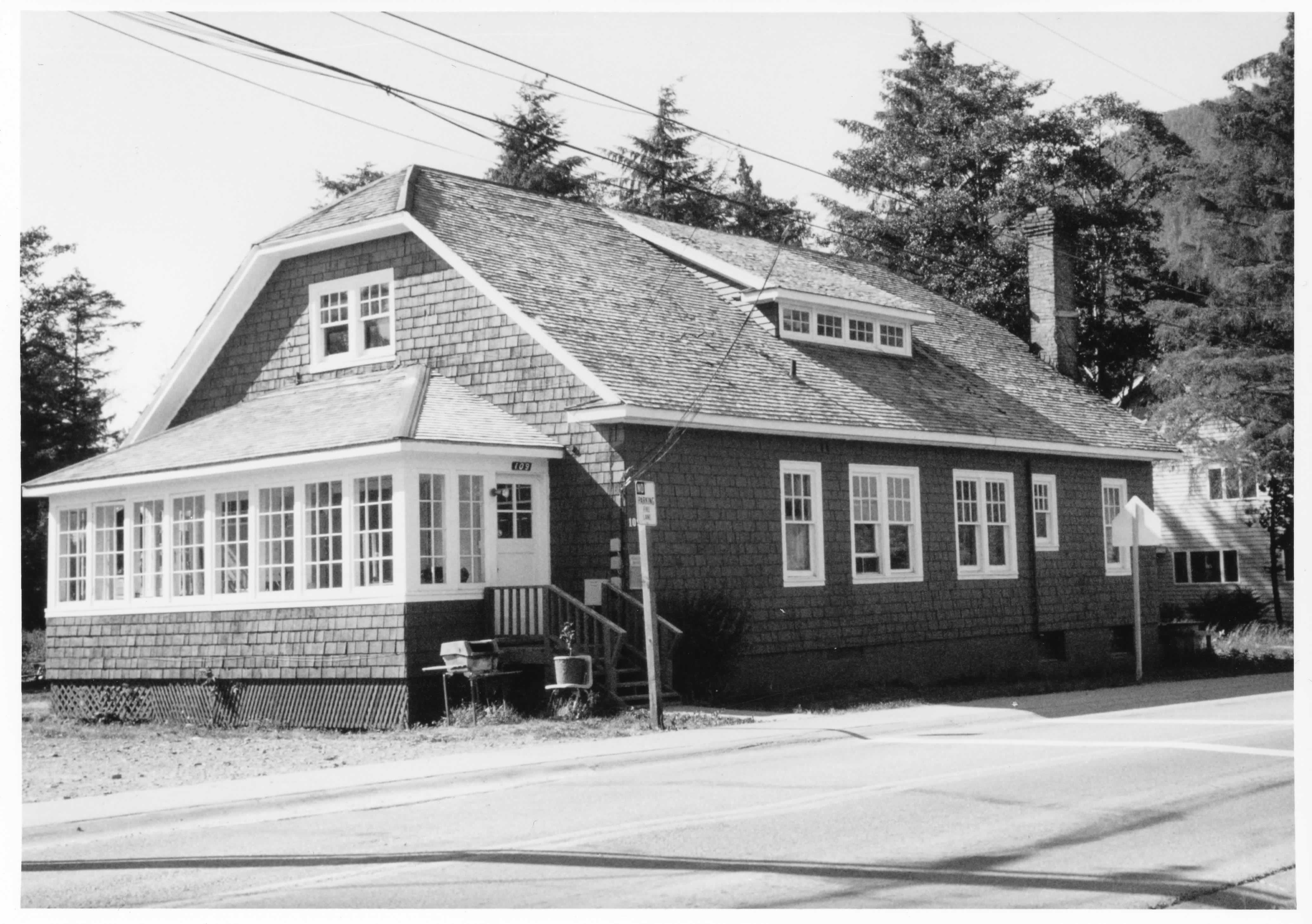
Tillie Paul Manor

In 1882, Tillie Kinnon married Louis Francis Paul, with whom she had three sons. In 1887, Tillie was widowed. In 1905, Tillie married again to William Tamaree, with whom she had three daughters. In 1924, Tillie's son, William became the first Alaska Native elected to the territorial legislature. In 1952, Tillie Paul died at a hospital in Wrangell, age 90.

In 1979, an infirmary building on the campus of Sheldon Jackson College was named for Tillie Paul. In 1997, her daughter-in-law, Frances Lackey Paul, published a children's book, Kahtahah, based on her mother-in-law's early life. In 2001, the Sheldon Jackson School was designated a National Historic Landmark.

In 2015, Tillie Paul's great-granddaughter, Debra O'Gara, was named Tribal Court Presiding Judge by the Central Council of the Tlingit and Haida Indian Tribes of Alaska.

In 2020, Tillie's civil rights work and the charges brought against her in 1922 for “inducing an Indian not entitled to vote to vote at an election” were featured in the Alaska State Museum Exhibit, Alaska's Suffrage Stars.
