= Cornelia Templeton Hatcher =

American suffragette and temperance activist

Cornelia Hatcher
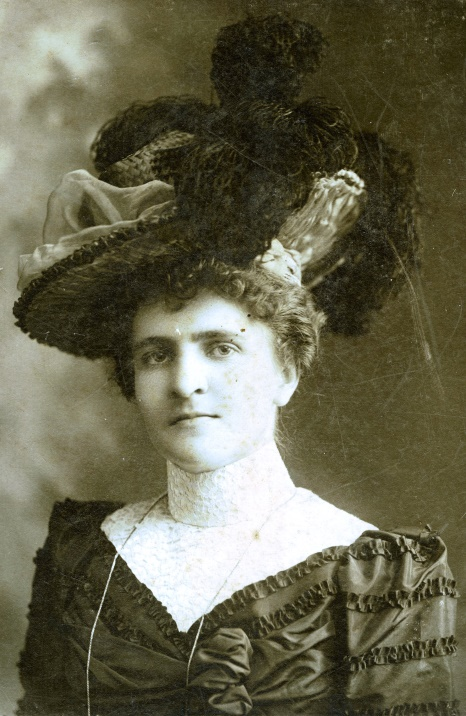
- Born: Cornelia Templeton Jewett; October 2, 1867; Sturgeon Bay, Wisconsin
- Died: May 5, 1953 (aged 85); Altus, Arkansas
- Occupation: Activist
- Spouse: Robert Lee Hatcher

Cornelia Hatcher (1867–1953) was an American suffragist and temperance activist. In 2009, Hatcher was named to the Alaska Women's Hall of Fame.

== Early life and education ==
Cornelia Templeton Jewett was born on January 2, 1867, in Sturgeon Bay, Wisconsin. In 1909, she moved to Alaska. She attended the Alaska-Yukon-Pacific Exposition that year, too. In 1911, she married gold miner Robert Lee Hatcher. From 1912 until 1913 they lived in Knik, Alaska. Hatcher had one daughter, Hazel Templeton.

== Work ==
Hatcher was an influential figure in numerous social movements, and a leader in the Alaska Federation of Women's Clubs.

Hatcher is perhaps most celebrated for her lobbying work in the women's suffrage movement in Alaska. Prior to 1913, Alaskan law did not permit women to vote, and the United States Constitution did not guarantee women the right to vote (also called "suffrage") until the 19th Amendment was ratified in 1920. In 1913, Hatcher wrote a petition demanding the right to vote for women, which was submitted to the Alaskan Territorial Legislature. Alaska passed a law giving women voting rights equal to men's, becoming one of only nine states to do so seven years before the 19th Amendment. The law stated:

Be it enacted by the legislature of the Territory of Alaska: That in all elections which are now, or may be hereafter authorized by law in the Territory of Alaska, or any subdivision or municipality thereof, the elective franchise is hereby extended to such women as have the qualifications of citizenship required of male electors.

Hatcher was also active in the Temperance Movement, which sought to ban alcohol use in the United States. Hatcher was president of the Alaska chapter of the Woman's Christian Temperance Union from 1913 until 1924. She was editor of The Union Signal, a social welfare journal published by the Women's Christian Temperance Union. Hatcher led the successful fight for prohibition in Alaska. In 1916, the Territory of Alaska held a territory-wide referendum, voting by a two-to-one margin to ban alcohol. The resulting law was called a Bone-Dry Law because it was more restrictive than prohibition laws elsewhere. Starting January 1, 1918, alcohol was banned and saloons and breweries closed throughout the territory. Alcohol consumption remained illegal in Alaska until 1933.

Hatcher was instrumental in the passing of the Uniform School Act of 1917, which she traveled to Washington, D.C. to testify about in person. The act secured funding for schools in Alaska to be funded with a 75% contribution from the Alaskan territorial government, with the remaining 25% provided by taxes in the schools communities.

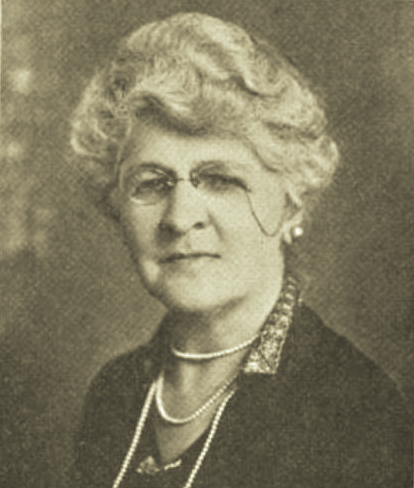
(1926)

From 1924 until 1930, Hatcher lived in Long Beach, California. In addition to running her own beauty salon in Long Beach, Hatcher participated in numerous women's organizations in the area and took a leadership role in the Business and Professional Women's Club there.

From 1930 until 1935, Hatcher worked as a Research Secretary for the Women's Division of the Republican Party during President Herbert Hoover's administration.

== Later life and legacy ==
Hatcher died on May 5, 1953, in Altus, Arkansas.

In 2009, Hatcher was named to the Alaska Women's Hall of Fame. Hatcher's personal papers reside in the collection of the Anchorage Museum.
