= Mendenhall (surname) =

Mendenhall is a British surname. Notable people with the surname include:

- Bronco Mendenhall (born 1966), University of Virginia football coach
- Bruce Mendenhall (born 1951), American murderer and suspected serial killer
- Charles Elwood Mendenhall (1872–1935), American physicist and University of Wisconsin professor
- David Mendenhall (born 1971), American science fiction and comedy film actor
- Dorothy Reed Mendenhall (1874–1964), American physician
- George E. Mendenhall (1916–2016), American academic and educator
- John Mendenhall (colonel) (1829–1892), American military official
- Joseph Mendenhall (1920–2013), American diplomat
- Ken Mendenhall (born 1948), former American football player
- Mat Mendenhall (born 1957), American football player
- Murray Mendenhall (1898–1972), American basketball player
- Murray Mendenhall Jr. (1925–2014), American football player
- Nereus Mendenhall (1819–1893), American politician and educator
- Rashard Mendenhall (born 1987), former NFL running back
- Robert Mendenhall (born 1954), president Western Governors University
- Ruth Dyar Mendenhall (1912–1989), American rock climber, mountaineer and author
- Thomas Corwin Mendenhall (1841–1924), American physicist and meteorologist, namesake of Alaskan place names
- Thomas C. Mendenhall (historian) (1910–1998), Yale professor, president of Smith College; authority on collegiate rowing
- Walter Curran Mendenhall (1871–1957), former director of the U.S. Geological Survey
