= Thomas Mendenhall =

Thomas Mendenhall may refer to:

- Thomas Corwin Mendenhall (1841–1924), American physicist and meteorologist
- Thomas C. Mendenhall (historian) (1910–1998), Yale professor, president of Smith College, and authority on collegiate rowing
