= Laura Waterman =

American mountaineer and author

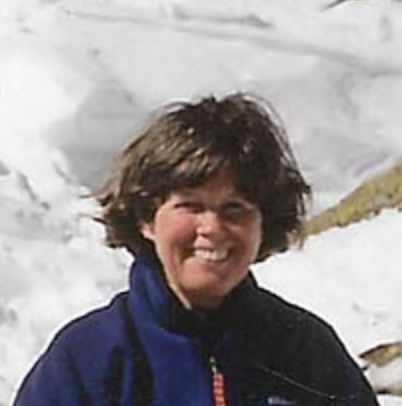
- Born: October 10, 1939 Lawrenceville, New Jersey, U.S.
- Occupation: Author; conservationist; climber
- Education: Hollins College
- Subject: Outdoors; Climbing; Conservation
- Notable works: Backwoods Ethics; Wilderness Ethics; Forest and Crag; Yankee Rock & Ice; A Fine Kind of Madness; Losing the Garden; Starvation Shore; Calling Wild Places Home
- Spouse: Guy Waterman (d. 2000)

Website
- laurawaterman.com

Laura Waterman (born 10 October 1939) is an American author, mountaineer and ice climber, homesteader, and conservationist, primarily known for her books on the outdoors, many as a collaborative effort with her husband Guy Waterman. They were early spokespersons and advocates for the hiking movement of the 1970s with their books Backwoods Ethics and Wilderness Ethics. The Watermans' writing and advocacy are credited with giving significant impetus to the Leave No Trace program.

== Early life ==
Laura Waterman was born Laura Johnson in 1939 to Catherine and Thomas Herbert Johnson. Thomas Johnson was a noted teacher and scholar, particularly of Emily Dickinson, at the Lawrenceville School in Lawrenceville, New Jersey. In 1962, Laura graduated from Hollins College in Virginia with a degree in English, and moved to New York City to work in publishing. She met her future husband Guy Waterman in the fall of 1969 while on a weekend climbing trip to the Shawangunk Mountains North of New York.

== Homesteading and Barra ==
In 1973, Laura and Guy Waterman purchased 27 acres in East Corinth, Vermont, to build a cabin and construct a new life far from the city, gaining inspiration from Helen and Scott Nearing’s book Living the Good Life. They named their cabin Barra, for Guy's ancestral Scottish island homestead.

== Climbing ==
The move to Vermont and the adoption of the homesteading lifestyle was in large part a way to simply leave more time to climb mountains. Laura went on to climb all 48 of the 4000-foot New Hampshire peaks seven times, and in 1975 made the first female free ascent of The Black Dike (WI4+, M3), a New Englands most famous ice climbing route that was described by Yvon Chouinard as "A filthy black horrendous icicle."

== Writing ==
The Watermans' devotion to the mountains of the Northeast generated two definitive mountain histories, Forest and Crag: A History of Hiking, Trail Blazing, and Adventure in the Northeast Mountains (1989), and Yankee Rock & Ice: A History of Climbing in the Northeastern United States (1993). Their last co-authored book was a collection of fiction and essays, A Fine Kind of Madness: Mountain Adventures Tall and True (2000) was published a few months after Guy's death.

Waterman is the subsequent author of three other books: a memoir Losing the Garden: The Story of a Marriage (2005), Starvation Shore, a historical novel on the Lady Franklin Bay Expedition of the 1880s (2019), and a second memoir Calling Wild Places Home: A Memoir in Essays (2024).

She administers The Waterman Fund, supporting education, trail work, and research in the alpine and subalpine zones of Northeastern North America.

== Publications ==
=== Singly authored books ===
- Losing the Garden: The Story of a Marriage, Shoemaker & Hoard, 2005, ISBN 978-1593761042
- Starvation Shore, University of Wisconsin Press, Madison, 2019, ISBN 978-0299323400
- Calling Wild Places Home: A Memoir in Essays, SUNY Press, Albany, 2024, ISBN 978-1438496245

=== Coauthored books ===
- Forest and Crag: A History of Hiking, Trail Blazing, and Adventure in the Northeast Mountains (co-author with Guy Waterman), Excelsior Editions, 1989, ISBN 978-1438475301
- Wilderness Ethics: Preserving the Spirit of Wildness, (co-author with Guy Waterman, Countryman Press, 1993 ISBN 978-0881502565
- Yankee Rock & Ice: A History of Climbing in the Northeastern United States (co-author with Guy Waterman), Stackpole Books, 1993, ISBN 978-0811737685
- A Fine Kind of Madness: Mountain Adventures Tall and True (co-author with Guy Waterman), Mountaineers Books. 2000, ISBN 978-0898867343
- The Green Guide to Low Impact Hiking and Camping (previously Backwoods Ethics), (co-author with Guy Waterman), Countryman Press, 2016, ISBN 978-0881502572
