= Guy Waterman =

American mountaineer, writer, and outdoor avocate

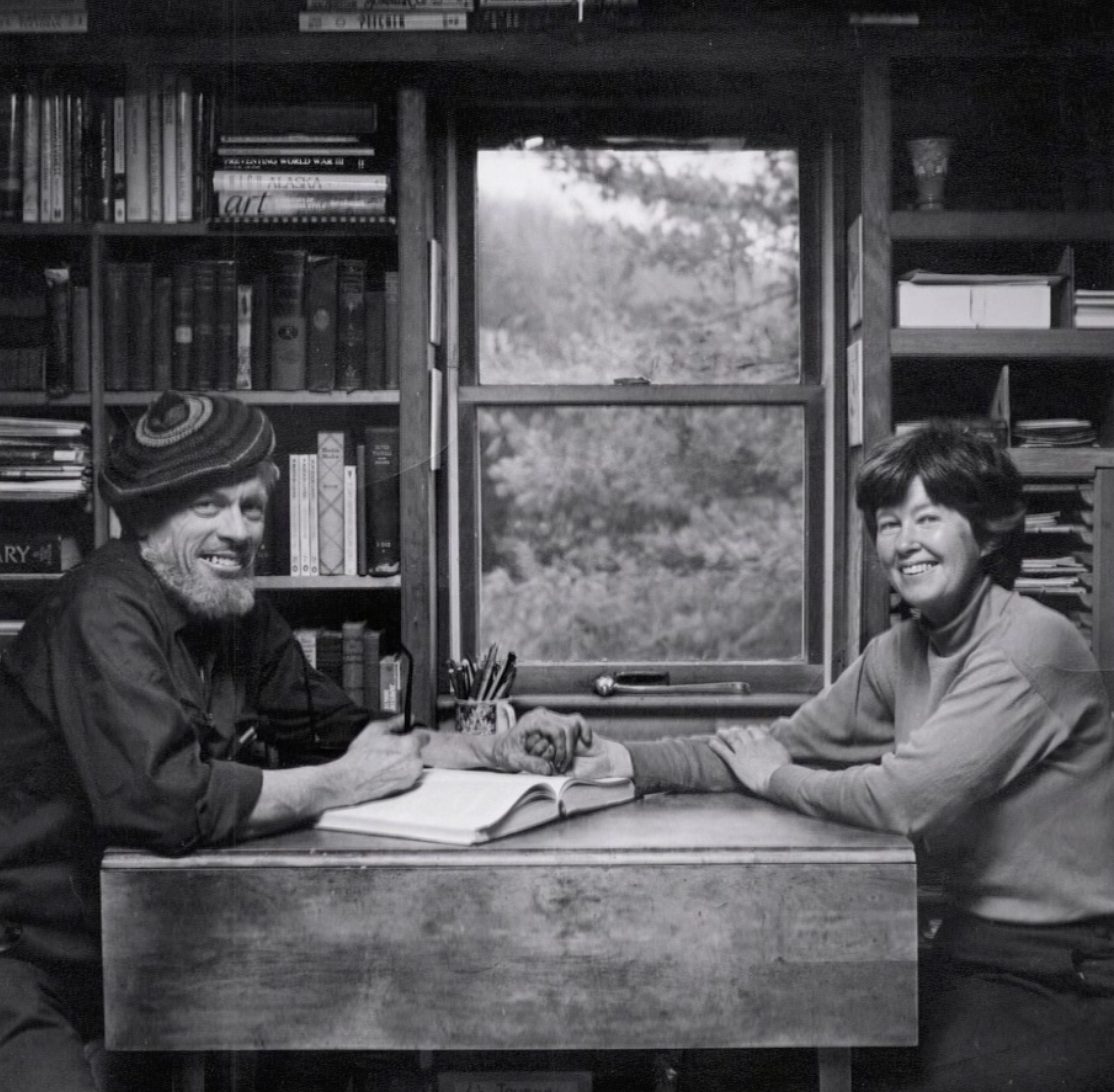
- Guy and Laura Waterman
- Born: May 1, 1932; New Haven, Connecticut, U.S.
- Died: February 6, 2000 (aged 67); Mt. Lafayette, New Hampshire, U.S.
- Education: Taft School; Sidwell Friends School; George Washington University
- Occupations: Nonfiction writer; conservationist; climber; musician
- Spouses: Emily Morrison (1950-1972); Laura Waterman (m. 1972)
- Children: 3
- Writing career
- Subjects: Outdoors; climbing; conservation
- Notable works: Backwoods Ethics; Wilderness Ethics; Forest and Crag; Yankee Rock & Ice; A Fine Kind of Madness
- Notable awards: David R. Brower Conservation Award; 2012 Outstanding Service in Mountain Conservation

Guy Waterman (1932–2000) was an American writer, mountaineer, conservationist, musician, and homesteader. He was primarily known for his books about the outdoors, specifically the mountains of the Northeastern United States. Backwoods Ethics and Wilderness Ethics, written collaboratively with his wife, Laura Waterman, helped define the clean camping and hiking movements of the 1970s, and are credited with helping spawn the Leave No Trace program. Waterman also authored, with Laura, two definitive mountain histories: Forest and Crag: A History of Hiking, Trail Blazing, and Adventure in the Northeast Mountains, and Yankee Rock & Ice: A History of Climbing in the Northeastern United States. Their final book was a collection of fiction and essays: A Fine Kind of Madness: Mountain Adventures Tall and True published a few months after his death.

== Early life ==
Guy Waterman was born in New Haven, Connecticut, on May 1, 1932, the youngest of the five children of Alan T. Waterman and his wife Mary. The family moved to Cambridge, Massachusetts, where he began a lifelong interest in baseball. Waterman went on to write for baseball magazines and was a longtime member of the Society for American Baseball Research.

In 1946 the family moved again and he enrolled in the Taft School in Watertown, Connecticut. At Taft he discovered jazz, and began studying jazz piano seriously. After another move, he finished high school at the Sidwell Friends School in Washington, D.C.

In 1953 Waterman graduated Phi Beta Kappa with a degree in economics from George Washington University. While in college, Guy married his Sidwell schoolmate Emily Morrison, and they had two sons: William Antonio (Bill) Waterman, born April 24, 1951, and John Mallon (Johnny) Waterman, born September 17, 1952. During this busy time, Waterman was also the pianist for Scotty Lawrence's Riverboat Trio. In late 1953, the Riverboat Trio reorganized, and Waterman left the group. A third son, James Reed Waterman, was born on July 11, 1955.

== Career in economics and speechwriting ==
Pursuing a more stable career, Waterman worked as an economist for the Washington Chamber of Commerce from 1955 to 1958, then was hired as legislative aide and speechwriter for the US Senate Minority Policy Committee. He moved to Capitol Hill in 1959, where he served as a staffer and congressional speechwriter for – among others – future US president Gerald Ford. In June 1960 Waterman was hired by the Republican National Committee as a writer of party platforms and speeches for Richard Nixon.

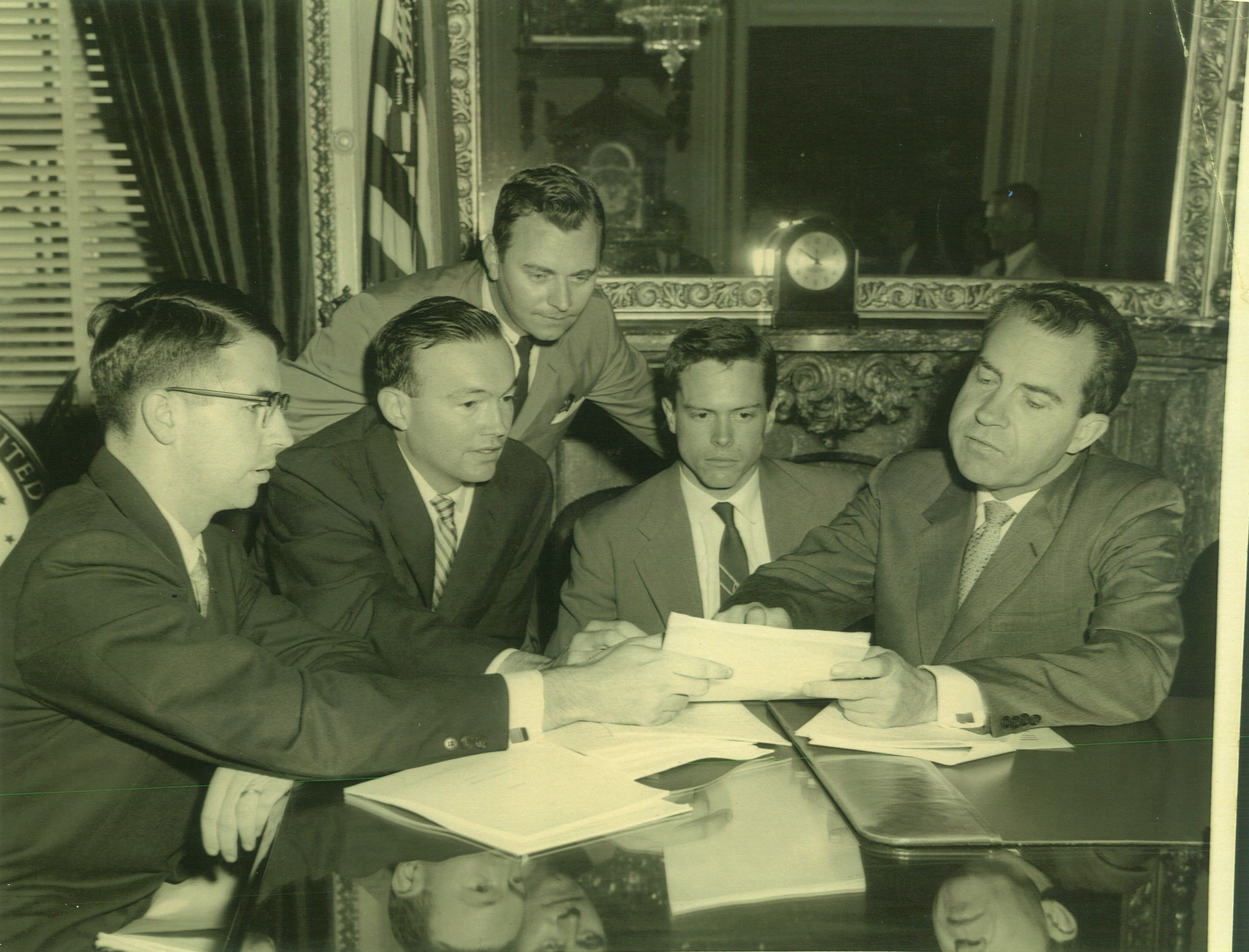
Waterman next to Nixon

After Nixon lost the 1960 presidential election, Guy received an offer to write speeches for the president of General Electric in New York City. Connections between corporate and political work being somewhat fluid at the time, he was asked to write a first draft of a speech for Dwight D. Eisenhower when the ex-president headed Manufacturers Hanover Trust Company.

== Climbing ==
Waterman began climbing in the fall of 1963, prompted by a series of articles in Sports Illustrated by Jack Olsen on efforts to climb the North Wall of the Eiger that were later published as The Climb Up to Hell. Waterman signed up for rock climbing instruction offered by the Appalachian Mountain Club at the cliffs 90 miles (140 km) north of Times Square called the Shawangunks. He had discovered the White Mountains in New Hampshire as well and often took his two older sons along on multi-day trips.

Waterman climbing a cliff

In 1965 Waterman began winter climbing, and became one of the first to ascend the 46 Adirondack peaks over 4,000 feet (1,200 m) in winter. With son Johnny he began exploring local ice routes, first in Connecticut and then in the famously steep-sided gullies of Huntington Ravine on New Hampshire's Mount Washington.

On June 19, 1969, his son Bill, on a western adventure that involved hopping freight trains, lost his leg in a railroad yard accident in Winnipeg, Manitoba. Bill's accident furthered difficulties in Waterman's marriage, and he and Emily soon separated.

Waterman met Laura Johnson, a newcomer to the Shawangunks climbing scene, in the spring of 1970. The daughter of noted Emily Dickinson scholar Thomas H. Johnson, Laura had been working as a book editor in New York since 1962. The two became inseparable, climbing together every weekend.

Guy and Laura were married on August 26, 1972. Both wanted to detach themselves from the city and devote more time to climbing and the outdoors. The couple found inspiration through reading Helen and Scott Nearing's Living the Good Life. They bought land in rural Vermont, moving to their homestead on June 9, 1973.

== Homesteading and writing ==
The Watermans sought to combine a life of simple living close to nature, as self-sufficiently as they could, while maximizing time in the mountains and climbing. They built a small cabin without electricity or plumbing, heated it from their woodlot, and filled their cellar with crops from their garden. They made room for Waterman's Steinway grand piano and their library of over a thousand books.

They lived on a tight budget, with income from writing for Backpacker and Appalachia, and a monthly column on camping and hiking for New England Outdoors. Their first book grew out of those columns, and was published by Stone Wall Press in 1979. Backwoods Ethics was received by environmentalists and wilderness managers as a prophetic call to reevaluate the impact of recreation on the wilderness. It was joined by its companion volume Wilderness Ethics in 1993.

As active climbers and hikers, the Watermans became interested in the history of the northeastern mountains. In 1989 AMC Books published their Forest and Crag, a definitive social history of mountain discovery, recreation, and trail-building. In 1993, Stackpole Books released their Yankee Rock & Ice, chronicling first ascents and the personalities who made history on the Northeast's cliffs and icefalls.

Guy Waterman's sons both suffered mysterious and tragically early ends. Bill disappeared under unknown circumstances in 1973, and Johnny died climbing Denali in Alaska in 1981.

== Advocacy ==
In 1981 when the Appalachian Mountain Club launched its trail-adopter program, the Watermans signed up for Franconia Ridge, one of the most popular alpine trails in the Northeast.

Guy Waterman ended up climbing all the 48 peaks over 4,000 feet in winter six times. Reveling in forbidding terrain and ferocious weather, he climbed each of them by off-trail routes, each solo and each from all four compass points, all in snow and ice.

== Death and legacy ==
Guy Waterman took his own life, a death by exposure near the summit of Mount Lafayette on his adopted Franconia Ridge, on February 6, 2000. The Watermans' last co-authored book, A Fine Kind of Madness, was published a few months later.

After Guy's death, Laura and some friends founded The Waterman Fund, a non-profit that fosters the spirit of wildness and conserves alpine areas of Northeastern North America through education, trail rehabilitation, and research. The Guy Waterman Alpine Steward Award is given out annually to a recipient who has demonstrated a commitment to protecting the physical and spiritual qualities of the mountain wilderness in the Northeast.

In 2012 the American Alpine Club posthumously awarded Guy Waterman, along with Laura Waterman and John Stannard, the David R. Brower Conservation Award for Outstanding Service in Mountain Conservation.

The Vermont chapter of the Society for American Baseball Research, located in Burlington, is named in honor of Waterman.

== Publications ==
=== Coauthored books ===
- Forest and Crag: A History of Hiking, Trail Blazing, and Adventure in the Northeast Mountains (co-author with Laura Waterman), Excelsior Editions, 1989, ISBN 978-1438475301
- Wilderness Ethics: Preserving the Spirit of Wildness, (co-author with Laura Waterman, Countryman Press, 1993 ISBN 978-0881502565
- Yankee Rock & Ice: A History of Climbing in the Northeastern United States (co-author with Laura Waterman), Stackpole Books, 1993, ISBN 978-0811737685
- A Fine Kind of Madness: Mountain Adventures Tall and True (co-author with Laura Waterman), Mountaineers Books. 2000, ISBN 978-0898867343
- The Green Guide to Low Impact Hiking and Camping (previously Backwoods Ethics), (co-author with Laura Waterman), Countryman Press, 2016, ISBN 978-0881502572
