= Mendenhall =

Mendenhall may refer to:

== People ==
- Mendenhall (surname)

== Places ==
=== United States ===
- Mendenhall Glacier, near Juneau, Alaska
- Mendenhall Lake, near Juneau, Alaska
- Mendenhall River, near Juneau, Alaska
- Mendenhall Valley, near Juneau, Alaska
- Mendenhall, Mississippi
- Mendenhall, Pennsylvania
- Mendenhall Springs, California

== Other ==
- Mendenhall Observatory, Stillwater, Oklahoma
- Mendenhall Order, a decision to change the system of weights and measures to the metric system
- Mendenhall Homeplace, a historic 1811 Quaker Homeplace in Jamestown, North Carolina
- United States v. Mendenhall, a 1980 decision of the United States Supreme Court

== See also ==
- Mildenhall (disambiguation)
