= Alan Tower Waterman =

American physicist (1892–1967)

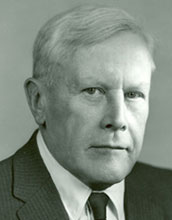

1st Director of the National Science Foundation
- In office 1951–1963
- President: Harry Truman; Dwight Eisenhower; John F. Kennedy
- Succeeded by: Leland J. Haworth

Personal details
- Born: June 4, 1892 Cornwall-on-Hudson, New York, U.S.
- Died: November 30, 1967 (aged 75) Washington, D.C., U.S.

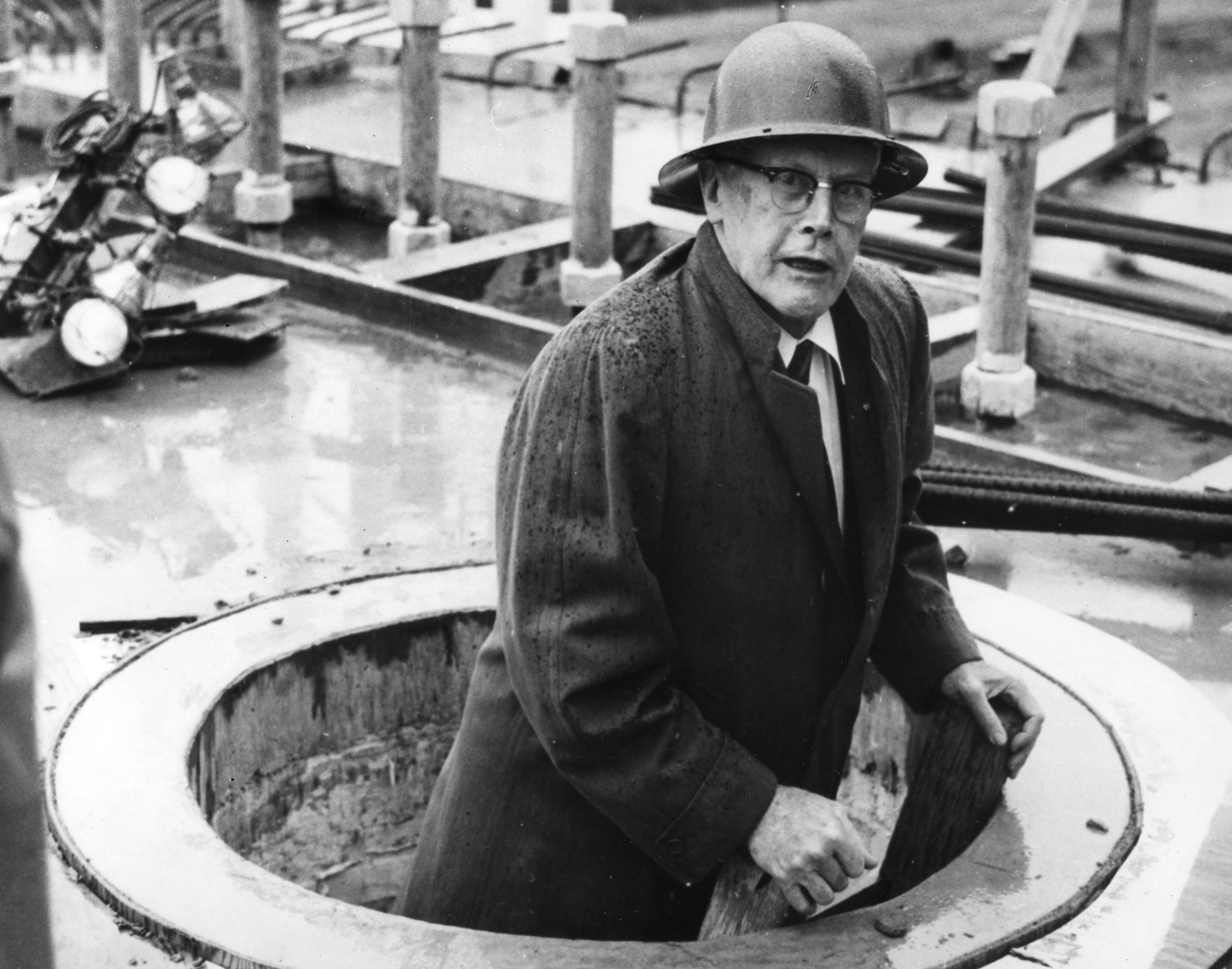
Alan Tower Waterman inspects a radio telescope at Greenbank, West Virginia (1959)

Alan Tower Waterman (June 4, 1892 – November 30, 1967) was an American physicist.

== Biography ==
Born in Cornwall-on-Hudson, New York, he grew up in Northampton, Massachusetts. His father was a professor of physics at Smith College. Alan also became a physicist, doing his undergraduate and doctoral work at Princeton University from which he obtained his Ph.D. in 1916.

He joined the faculty of the University of Cincinnati, and married Vassar graduate Mary Mallon (sister of Henry Neil Mallon) there in August 1917. He later became a professor at Yale University, and moved to North Haven, Connecticut in 1929. During World War II, he took leave of absence from Yale to become director of field operations for the Office of Scientific Research and Development and the family moved to Cambridge, MA. He continued his government work and became deputy chief of the Office of Naval Research. In 1950, he was appointed by President Truman as first director of the U.S. National Science Foundation (NSF) Waterman was awarded the Public Welfare Medal from the National Academy of Sciences in 1960. He served as director until 1963, when he retired and was subsequently awarded the Presidential Medal of Freedom.

Alan and Mary had six children: Alan Jr, an atmospheric physicist who taught at Stanford University, Neil, Barbara, Anne, and Guy, writer, climber, and conservationist. A daughter Mary died in childhood.

Possessed of a gentle nature, Alan Waterman was known for his calm and reasoned point of view. He believed in public service. Besides his scientific talents, he was an accomplished musician, revealing his sense of humor by walking the corridors of the National Science Foundation playing his bagpipes. He had a fine voice and singing together was a family ritual. An avid outdoorsman, Dr. Waterman canoed the rivers and lakes of northern Maine during extensive summer trips in the 1930s and 1940s. He was accompanied by his sons and colleagues, in particular Karl Compton, then president of MIT. Dr. Waterman was known to say that becoming a licensed Maine Guide meant possibly more to him than his NSF appointment.

In 1961, he was chosen as one of 50 outstanding Americans of meritorious performance in the fields of endeavor, to be honored as a Guest of Honor to the first annual Banquet of the Golden Plate in Monterey, California. Honor was awarded by vote of the National Panel of Distinguished Americans of the Academy of Achievement.

The crater Waterman on the Moon is named after him, as is Mount Waterman in the Hughes Range of Antarctica. Since 1975, the National Science Foundation has annually issued the Alan T. Waterman Award (named in Waterman's honor) to a promising young researcher.

Waterman died on November 30, 1967.

== Tributes ==
A month later after his death, President Lyndon B. Johnson made a statement to commemorate him.

The American people mourn the passing of a foremost man of science and of human purpose, Dr. Alan T. Waterman. Our Government has lost a trusted counselor. As chief scientist of the Office of Naval Research and as first director of the National Science Foundation, he left an indelible stamp of achievement on one of the most vital areas of American life. He will be missed. But succeeding generations will be wiser for his skill and richer for the foresight that marked his long career.

Leland John Haworth also paid his respects in his statement:

It was with deep sadness that I learned of the death of Alan Waterman. The first director of the National Science Foundation. Alan Waterman successfully guided this organization from a small beginning to a position of strength and influence. He, more than any other single person, made the Foundation an important bulwark of the Nation's scientific strength. He left his own indelible mark of quality and of integrity in every field on activity in which the Foundation was involved. When Alan Waterman took the helm of the fledging agency in 1951, few in Government recognized the importance of basic research in the total spectrum of the Nation's scientific and technological enterprise. Alan Waterman was one of those few; His work at the Office of Naval Research had already established that agency's leadership in providing financial support for basic American science. When he came to the Foundation he began to build another organization through whose efforts science could develop strength commensurate with its promise and with the Nation's needs.

== Sources ==
- Brown, Chip (2004). Good Morning Midnight. Riverhead Books. ISBN 1-57322-236-4.
- Waterman, Laura (2005). Losing the Garden: The Story of a Marriage. Shoemaker & Hoard. ISBN 1-59376-048-5.
- England, James Merton (1983). A Patron for Pure Science: The National Science Foundation's Formative Years, 1945–57. National Science Foundation. LCCN 82-14368.

Government offices
New office	Director of the National Science Foundation; April 1951 – June 1963	Succeeded by Leland J. Haworth
