= Leland John Haworth =

American particle physicist (1904–1979)

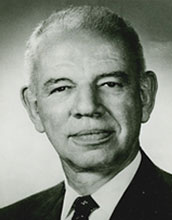

2nd Director of the National Science Foundation
- In office 1963–1969
- President: John F. Kennedy; Lyndon Johnson; Richard Nixon
- Preceded by: Alan T. Waterman
- Succeeded by: William D. McElroy

Personal details
- Born: July 11, 1904 Flint, Michigan, U.S.
- Died: March 5, 1979 (aged 74) Port Jefferson, New York, U.S.
- Spouses: Barbara Mottier (m. 1927; died 1961) Irene Benik (m. 1963)
- Scientific career
- Education: Indiana University (A.B., A.M.); University of Wisconsin–Madison (PhD)
- Fields: Particle physics
- Workplaces: University of Wisconsin–Madison; Massachusetts Institute of Technology; University of Illinois at Urbana–Champaign; Brookhaven National Laboratory
- Thesis: Energy distribution of secondary electrons from molybdenum (1931)
- Doctoral advisor: Charles Elwood Mendenhall

Leland John Haworth (July 11, 1904 – March 5, 1979) was an American particle physicist. In his long career he was head of the Brookhaven National Laboratory, the Atomic Energy Commission, the National Science Foundation, and was assistant to the president of Associated Universities, Inc.

== Early life ==
Leland John Haworth was born on July 11, 1904, in Flint, Michigan, although his parents were normally living in New York City at the time. Both of his parents, Martha (née Ackerman) and Paul Leland Haworth, were both teachers, and were Quakers. The family moved to Cleveland, Ohio, in 1907 for a brief time, then to Newton County, Indiana, in 1910. Haworth graduated from the Indiana University Bloomington with a Bachelor of Arts in 1925 and a Master of Arts in 1926. He also played college baseball for Indiana, and even played in the semi-pros.

After obtaining a scholarship, Haworth attended the University of Wisconsin–Madison and earned his Doctor of Philosophy in 1931. His thesis was titled "Secondary Electrons from Very Clean Metal Surfaces when Bombarded with Primary Electrons and his advisor was Charles Elwood Mendenhall.

== Personal life ==
In 1927 he married Barbara Mottier, the daughter of the chairman of the Botany Department at Indiana University, and they had two children: Jane and John. In 1959, Haworth learned that he had colon cancer, and then in February 1961, his wife died.

In May 1963, Haworth married Irene Benik, a secretary at the President's Science Advisory Committee.

== Career ==
He taught at the Arsenal Technical High School in Indianapolis for two years while working on his father's farm before pursuing his PhD. He worked as an instructor at the University of Wisconsin–Madison for six years, and began working on particle accelerators there in 1934. He then spent a year working at the Massachusetts Institute of Technology in 1937. After his father died, he then took a new position as faculty at the University of Illinois Urbana-Champaign.

=== Massachusetts Institute of Technology ===
With the onset of World War II, Haworth assisted with wartime research at the MIT Radiation Laboratory, developing new radar systems. He was a member of the steering committee and helped to manage the laboratory. He also wrote large sections of the Radiation Laboratory Series, a highly regarded technical work. He joined the newly created Brookhaven National Laboratory in Upton, New York, in 1948, immediately taking a leadership role as assistant director for special projects. He became the full director the next year, and held that position until 1961. While there, he helped with the construction of many experimental apparatus, including the Cosmotron. The laboratory soon gained worldwide recognition as a premier research facility. He was also president and director of the American Nuclear Society.

=== Atomic Energy Commission ===
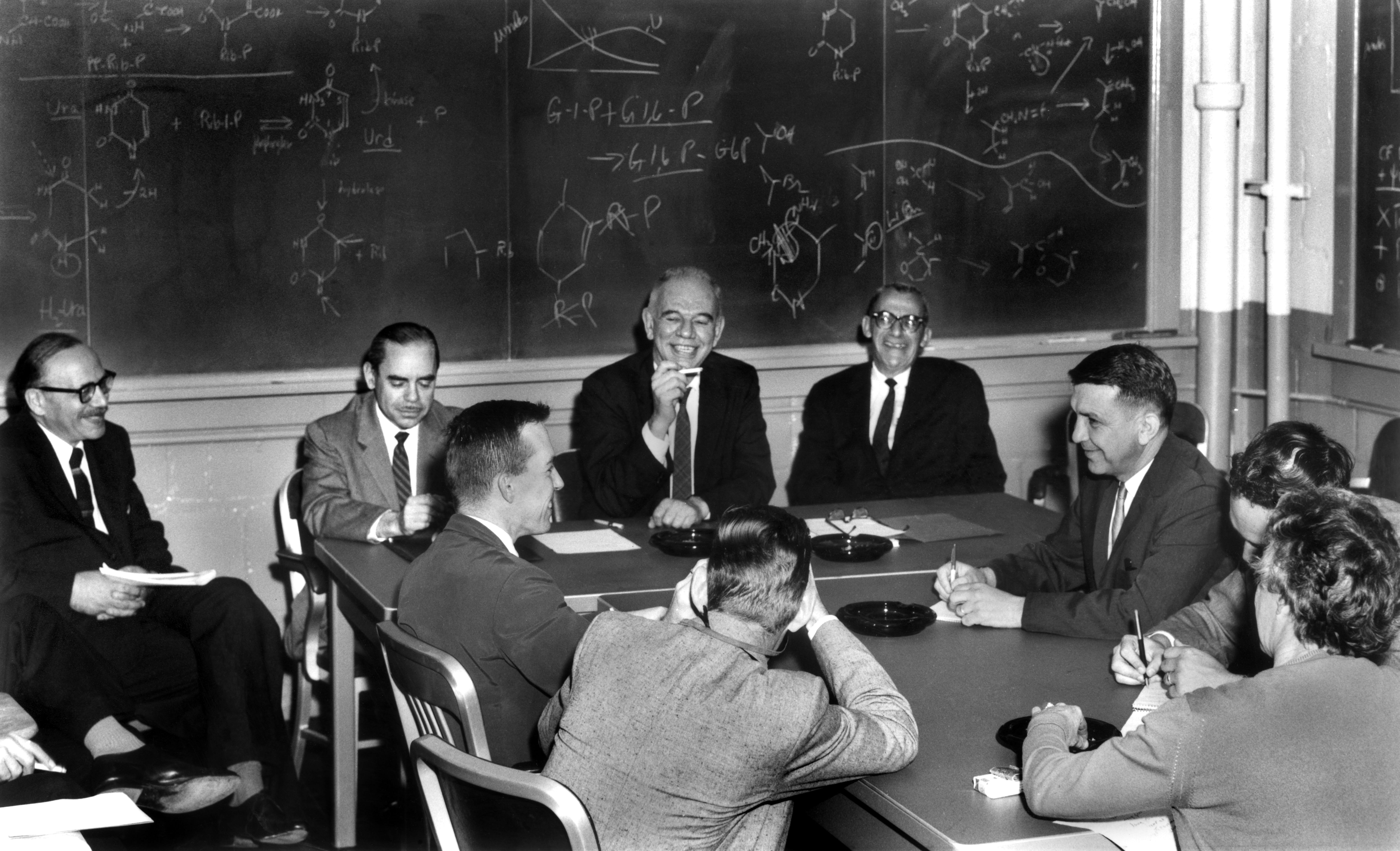
Commissioner Haworth at press conference in 1961, photograph by Ed Westcott

A few months after his first wife died in 1961, Haworth along with Glenn T. Seaborg, was assigned by President John F. Kennedy to become commissioner of the Atomic Energy Commission. He accepted the position and worked long hours, soon heading the research of the AEC. He supported a ban on atmospheric nuclear testing, helping to develop the Limited Test Ban Treaty in 1963. He also traveled to Alaska to assist with Operation Chariot, a plan to use nuclear bombs in the construction of a harbor as part of Operation Plowshare, and met with various Inuit groups. The project was never carried out. Haworth wrote Civilian Nuclear Power–A Report to the President–1962, an influential public policy paper.

=== National Science Foundation ===
In 1963, President Kennedy asked Haworth to direct the National Science Foundation. He tackled issues there such as Project Mohole, bringing new colleges into NSF research, and planning for the Very Large Array. He also assisted Congressman Emilio Q. Daddario draft an important NSF reorganization bill. Haworth was elected to the American Academy of Arts and Sciences, the American Philosophical Society, and the National Academy of Sciences in 1965. In 1969, Haworth's term as NSF director ended, and he moved to Long Island, New York. He became a part-time assistant to the president of Associated Universities, Inc., a position he held until 1975, and was special consultant to the director of Brookhaven.

== Death ==
Haworth died on March 5, 1979, at St. Charles Hospital in Port Jefferson, New York. He is buried in West Newton Cemetery, West Newton, Indiana.

Government offices
Preceded by Alan T. Waterman	Director of the National Science Foundation; July 1963 - June 1969	Succeeded by William D. McElroy
