= Johnny Waterman =

American mountaineer

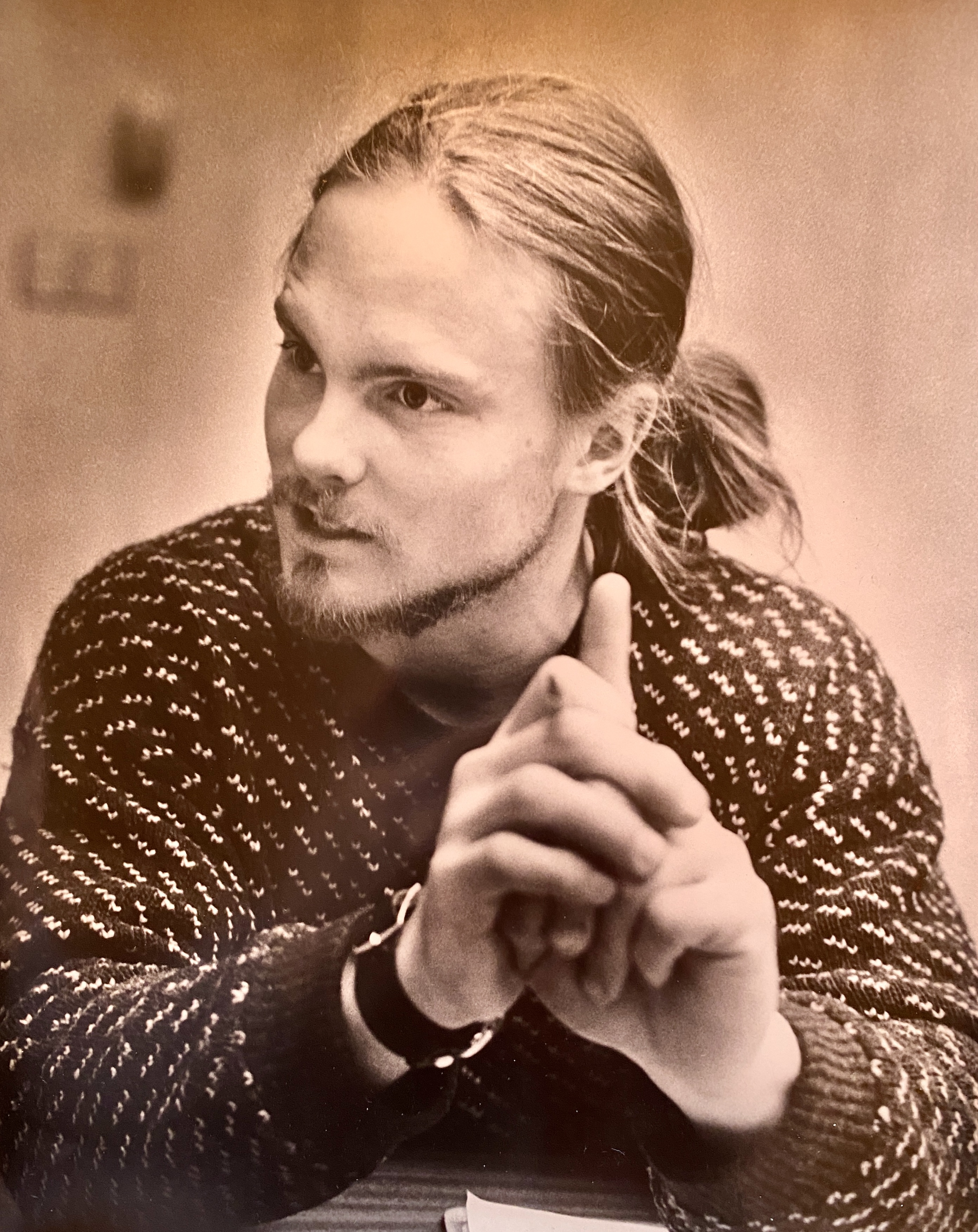
Johnny Waterman being interviewed

John Mallon "Johnny" Waterman (1952–1981) was an American mountaineer. The son of author, outdoor advocate, and mountaineer Guy Waterman, he was notable for several important firsts in climbing, and for his disappearance during an attempted solo climb of Denali.

== Early life ==
John Mallon Waterman was born in Washington, D.C., on September 17, 1952, to Guy Waterman and his first wife Emily (née Morrison). He was the second of their three sons, between William Antonio Waterman (1951–1973) and James Reed Waterman (born 1955). After the family moved to New York City, Guy introduced young Johnny to climbing on outings to New York's Shawangunks—a popular nearby climbing destination.

== First climbs ==
Johnny began climbing in earnest at the age of 13, discovering the Shawangunks and other mountains with his father and brother Bill. He was noticed early on as a climbing prodigy, surpassing his father's ability and dedicating himself to the craft with fierce concentration and resolve.

By the time he was in high school, Johnny was climbing difficult routes in the northern White mountains of New Hampshire, giving presentations about his exploits to climbing groups, and teaching climbing to novices.

== Approaching Alaska ==
In May 1969, the 17-year-old Johnny traveled to Alaska with a group led by Tom Frost to attempt the summit of Denali, at 20,301 feet the tallest mountain in North America. After a first try was ended by a bout of pulmonary edema and a return to camp, his second attempt a few days later was successful.

His success on Denali was the beginning of a long-term relationship with the Alaska mountains, and Johnny relocated to Fairbanks in 1971, enrolling at the University of Alaska. His friends noted an increasingly obsessive and eccentric approach to climbing and life in general.

== Mount Hunter ==
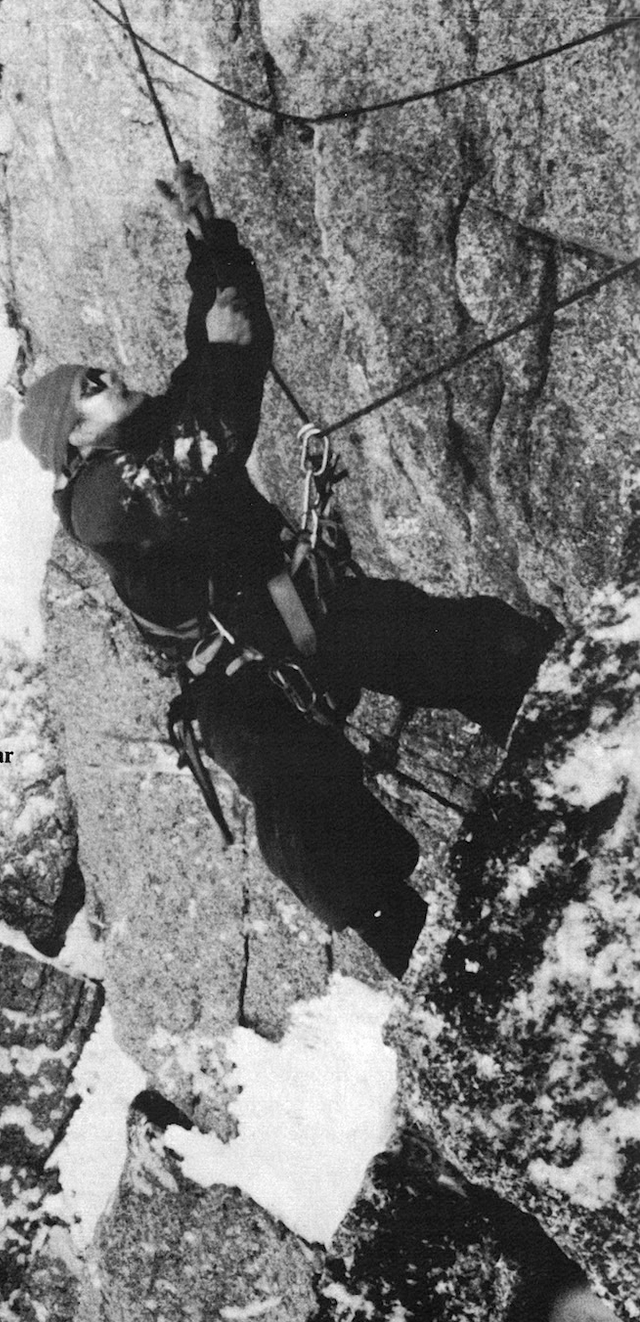
Johnny Waterman on the Cat's Ears pitch of Mount Hunter

Residence in Fairbanks allowed Johnny to contemplate and eventually accomplish a climb that made him famous: His 1978 145-day solo ascent of the southeast spur of Mount Hunter. The Hunter climb put Johnny in a category of one, being a first solo of a new route, but also because he achieved it using an eccentric style of many supply trips to transport an enormous amount of gear.

The exhaustion of approaching the summit of Mount Hunter did not prevent Johnny from completing a ritual he learned from his father, and he was able to turn a cartwheel on a ridge below the summit, watched by an astonished bush pilot who had flown by to check on him. Johnny documented his Mount Hunter climb in an article he wrote for the American Alpine Club journal the next year.

== Disappearance on Denali ==
In February 1981 Johnny committed himself to an audacious goal—to climb Denali again, but this time by himself, unsupported, after walking from Anchorage to the Ruth Glacier. His strange behavior around this time, and the near-impossibility of this winter climb have led some to wonder if it was a cry for help or even if he considered it a suicide mission.

After the long approach hike from Anchorage, crossing rivers of ice, and falling in at least once near Talkeetna, on April 1 Johnny left the Denali Mountain House in the Sheldon Amphitheater and started up the northwest fork of the Ruth Glacier toward Denali's East buttress. He had an odd collection of minimal supplies, but told those who asked that he intended to reach the East buttress and then proceed to the summit. He was last seen a few days later on that route at around 11,000 feet. Multiple searches were conducted throughout April by rangers and guides using helicopters and on foot, but these found only tracks and an abandoned campsite.

== Legacy ==
Johnny Waterman is remembered as a brilliant climber and troubled soul who slayed his demons only when he was in the mountains.
