= Charles Elwood Mendenhall =

Physicist and professor

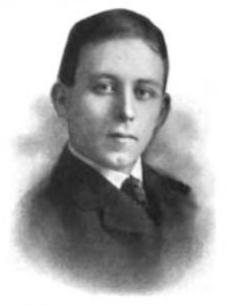
- In the University of Wisconsin–Madison yearbook for 1903
- Born: August 1, 1872; Columbus, Ohio, U.S.
- Died: August 18, 1935 (aged 63); Madison, Wisconsin, U.S.
- Resting place: Forest Hill Cemetery
- Spouse: Dorothy M. Reed (m. 1906)
- Children: 4, including Thomas C. Mendenhall
- Relatives: Thomas Corwin Mendenhall (father)

Academic background
- Education: Rose Polytechnic (AB); Johns Hopkins University (PhD)
- Doctoral advisor: Henry Rowland

Academic work
- Discipline: Physics
- Institutions: University of Wisconsin–Madison (1901–1935)
- Doctoral students: Leland John Haworth
- Military career
- Allegiance: United States
- Branch: U.S. Army Signal Corps
- Service years: 1917–1919
- Rank: Major
- Conflicts: World War I

Charles Elwood Mendenhall (August 1, 1872 – August 18, 1935) was an American physicist and professor at the University of Wisconsin–Madison.

== Early life ==
Charles Elwood Mendenhall was born on August 1, 1872, in Columbus, Ohio. He was the son of Susan Allen (née Marple) and Thomas Corwin Mendenhall. At the age of six to nine, he lived in Japan while his father taught at the University of Tokyo. There he became friends with John Morse, son of Edward S. Morse.

He received a Bachelor of Arts in 1894 from Rose Polytechnic in Terre Haute, Indiana. Starting in 1895, he studied under Henry Rowland at Johns Hopkins University and received a PhD in 1898. Under Rowland, he worked with Charles Greeley Abbot, head of the Smithsonian Astrophysical Observatory, and fellow student Frederick A. Saunders, a fellow PhD candidate, on a black-body radiation problem for his thesis.

== Career ==
After graduation from Rose Polytechnic in 1894, Mendenhall worked with George Putnam to make a transcontinental survey of the acceleration of gravity for the United States Coast and Geodetic Survey and taught physics for a year at the University of Pennsylvania. From 1898 to 1901, he taught at Williams College. In 1901, he succeeded fellow Hopkins graduate Robert W. Wood as assistant professor at the University of Wisconsin–Madison. He became a full professor in 1905.

He worked on a 1909 U.S. Mint assay and performed research at the Nela Laboratory in Cleveland in 1913. He is known for inventing the V-wedge method in 1911. In 1917, Mendenhall was made a Major of the Science and Research Division of the U.S. Army Signal Corps. He worked closely with his friend Robert Andrews Millikan at the Signal Corps. After World War I in 1919, he transferred to the U.S. Department of State, succeeding Henry A. Bumstead. He served for six months as the scientific attaché at the U.S. Embassy in London. He was chairman of the physical science division of the National Research Council in 1919 and 1920.

=== Later career ===
He became the department chair at the University of Wisconsin in 1926. In his time at the University of Wisconsin, he had 35 doctoral students, including Nobel Prize winner John Hasbrouck Van Vleck and Leland John Haworth. He remained professor until his death in 1935.

He was the vice president of The Optical Society in 1921 and the president of the American Physical Society from 1923 to 1925. He was the vice president of the American Association for the Advancement of Science in 1929.

== Personal life ==
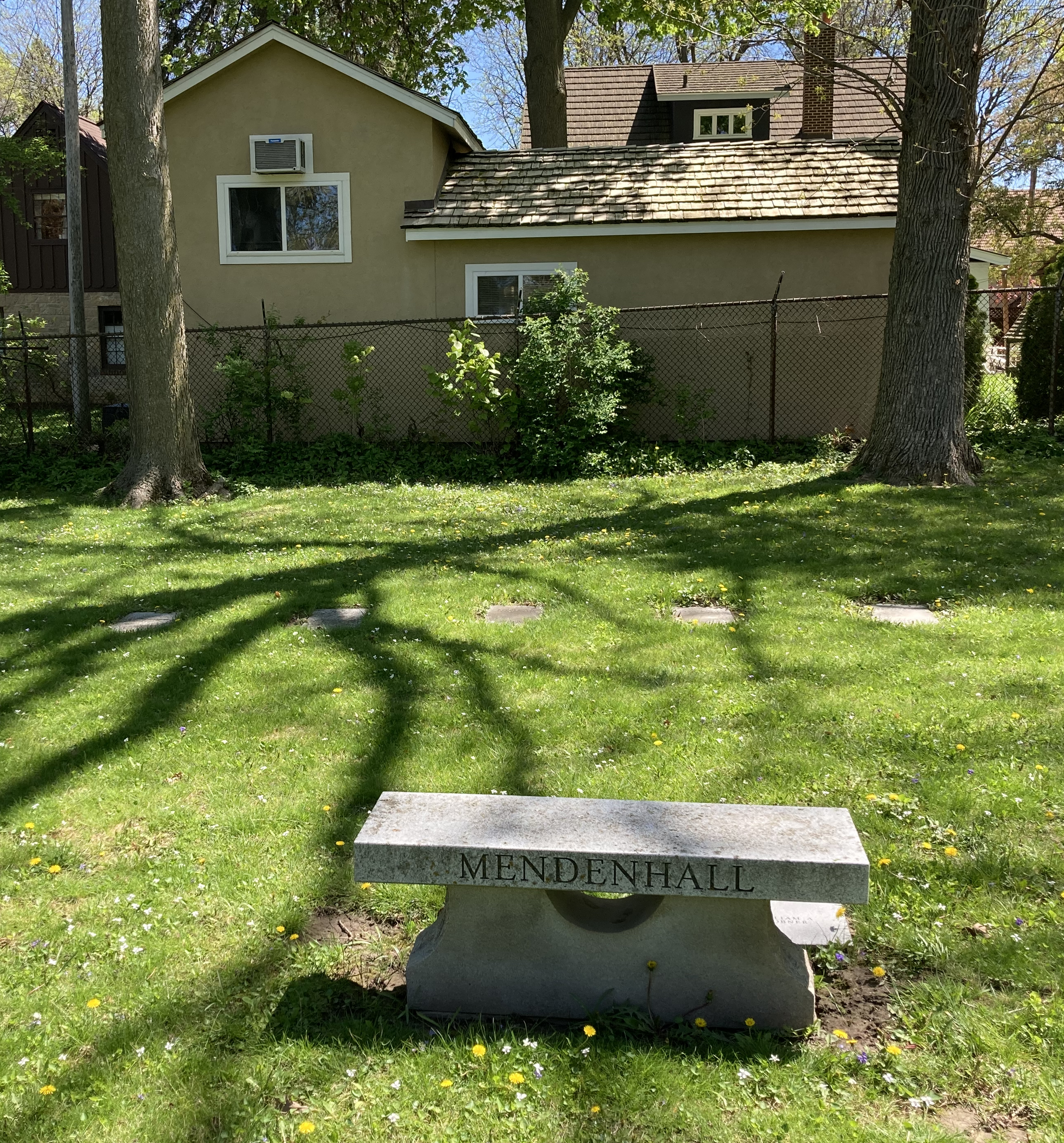
Mendenhall's grave (second from right) at Forest Hill Cemetery

Mendenhall married Dorothy M. Reed of Talcottville, New York on February 14, 1906. They met as students at Johns Hopkins. Together, they had four children, including Margaret, who died shortly after birth, Thomas Corwin Mendenhall and John Talcott Mendenhall.

He played the violin and was active in musical circles for much of his life.

== Death ==
Mendenhall died at a hospital in Madison, Wisconsin on August 18, 1935. He was buried at Forest Hill Cemetery.

== Awards and legacy ==
- Mendenhall was elected to the United States National Academy of Sciences in 1918.
- In 1935, he was appointed fellow of the American Academy of Arts and Sciences and a member of the American Philosophical Society.
- The Charles Elwood Mendenhall Fellowship is an award given to graduate students working in experimental physics at the University of Wisconsin–Madison.
