= Dorothy Reed Mendenhall =

American pediatrician (1874–1964)

Dorothy Mabel Reed Mendenhall
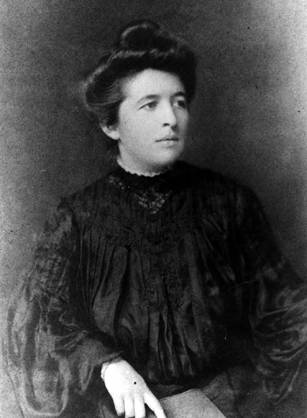
- Born: Dorothy Mabel Reed; September 22, 1874; Columbus, Ohio
- Died: July 31, 1964 (aged 89); Chester, Connecticut
- Resting place: Forest Hill Cemetery
- Education: Smith College; Johns Hopkins School of Medicine
- Spouse: Charles Elwood Mendenhall (m. 1906; died 1935)
- Children: 4, including Thomas C. Mendenhall

Dorothy Mabel Reed Mendenhall (September 22, 1874 – July 31, 1964) was a prominent pediatric physician specializing in cellular pathology. In 1901, she discovered that Hodgkin's disease was not a form of tuberculosis, by noticing the presence of a special cell, the Reed–Sternberg cell which bears her name. Dorothy was one of the first women to graduate from Johns Hopkins School of Medicine. She was also one of the first professionally trained female physicians of the late 19th and early 20th centuries.

== Early life ==
Dorothy Mabel Reed was born on September 22, 1874, in Columbus, Ohio, the third child to parents Grace Kimball and William Pratt Reed. A child of privilege, Reed lived on a large estate with her parents, brother, sister, aunts, uncles, and several cousins. By the age of thirteen, Reed had learned the basics of education, such as reading and writing, despite her lack of schooling. Around this time, Anna C. Gunning, a governess, was hired to help teach and guide Reed. In 1880, Reed's father died of diabetes and tuberculosis, leaving the family with a large sum of money, allowing the family to hire Gunning.

== Education ==
Other than the teaching that she received from Gunning, Mendenhall also enrolled in art classes at Columbus Art School, as well as received tutoring by her grandmother from time to time. In 1891, Mendenhall enrolled at Smith College, from which she graduated in 1895.

At Smith College, Mendenhall discovered her passion for medicine in a biology class during her second year. After discovering that Johns Hopkins School of Medicine had begun to accept women, Mendenhall took the required science courses at MIT and later applied to the school, becoming one of the few women to attend at this time. This decision was made, in part, to help her family out of the financial burden they were facing due to overspending. While attending MIT, Mendenhall faced many negative attitudes and comments made by male students and professors, which equipped her with the ability to ignore the continued negativity, directed toward women in medicine, while she attended Johns Hopkins.

Mendenhall graduated fourth in her class in 1900 and was awarded a prestigious internship at Johns Hopkins Hospital, serving under William Osler. Originally, Dr. Osler told Mendenhall the internship was "not a place for women", although he later said he did not want to be seen as hostile to women entering the medical school. Being accepted as a professional peer was a continual challenge to Reed in the male-dominated field of medicine at that time. Both professors and other students told her they thought that a medical education was "wasted" on a woman, since they thought she would eventually get married, have children, and never practice medicine. After Mendenhall was awarded the internship, Paul Woolley, one of her colleagues, threatened to leave the city if she did not hand it over to him. This event would inspire Mendenhall and further her drive for the medical profession as a woman.

== Work ==
=== Early career ===
Mendenhall and her colleagues were more interested in working in medicine than in spearheading a feminist movement, and her diary reflected this, with some entries discussing how some female students were overly sensitive, for which she had little tolerance. Mendenhall and her classmates, Margaret Long and Florence Sabin, were viewed as a different kind of female physician—ones who were not especially concerned with the feminist movement.

In 1901, Mendenhall became a Pathology fellow there under the direction of Dr. William Welch. This is where Mendenhall began researching Hodgkin's disease. As she continued her work in pathology, she also taught bacteriology and assisted with autopsies.

=== Discovery of the Reed-Sternberg cell ===
Also in 1901, at the age of 28, Mendenhall discovered the Reed-Sternberg cell, which she identified as a diagnostic marker for Hodgkin's lymphoma. Tuberculosis and Hodgkin's disease shared many similarities, so she compared tissue samples from tuberculosis and Hodgkin's patients, observing in Hodgkins patients a large distinctive cell that was not seen in tuberculosis patients. She was able to do this by using infected patients' lymph nodes to treat rabbits. This cell was initially named the Dorothy Reed cell, before later being named the Reed-Sternberg cell. Mendenhall effectively disproved the then-common belief that Hodgkin's lymphoma was a subtype of tuberculosis. She also determined that men and young adults are among the most vulnerable to the disease. She published her findings in 1902.

=== Pediatrics ===
Welch was very impressed with Mendenhall's success, and offered her an extension of her fellowship. She declined due to the worsening financial burden of her family. She inquired with Welch about assisting him in teaching, but he told her that women were not offered teaching positions. After declining the extended fellowship, Mendenhall accepted an internship in pediatrics at the Babies Hospital in New York City, part of the Columbia-Presbyterian Medical Center. In January 1903 she became the first resident physician there. She worked under the direction of L. E. Holt, a pioneer of pediatrics and the author of The Care and Feeding of Children.

Mendenhall began the second phase of her career in 1914 when she became a lecturer in the Department of Home Economics at the University of Wisconsin. The health issues and deaths of her two children inspired Mendenhall to take special interest in maternal and infant health. She decided to specifically focus on the issues of infant mortality. In 1915, Mendenhall established the first infant welfare clinic in Madison, Wisconsin, helping the city to achieve the lowest infant mortality rate among cities in the United States.

Mendenhall was called to work for the U.S. Children's Bureau during World War I, serving as a medical officer for the bureau from 1917 to 1936. She also worked on a national drive to weigh and measure all children under six in order to call attention to the prevalence of malnutrition and collect data on healthy heights and weights for children from birth through age six. Mendenhall performed studies relating to children in foreign countries such as France, England, and Belgium. Mendenhall focused much of her efforts on child nutrition by taking measurements of children ages six and below.

Later on, Mendenhall visited Denmark to compare Danish infant mortality rates with those in the United States. She believed that excessive medical treatment was responsible for the high rates in the U.S. compared to Denmark. She became an advocate for midwifery due to her research.

== Personal life ==
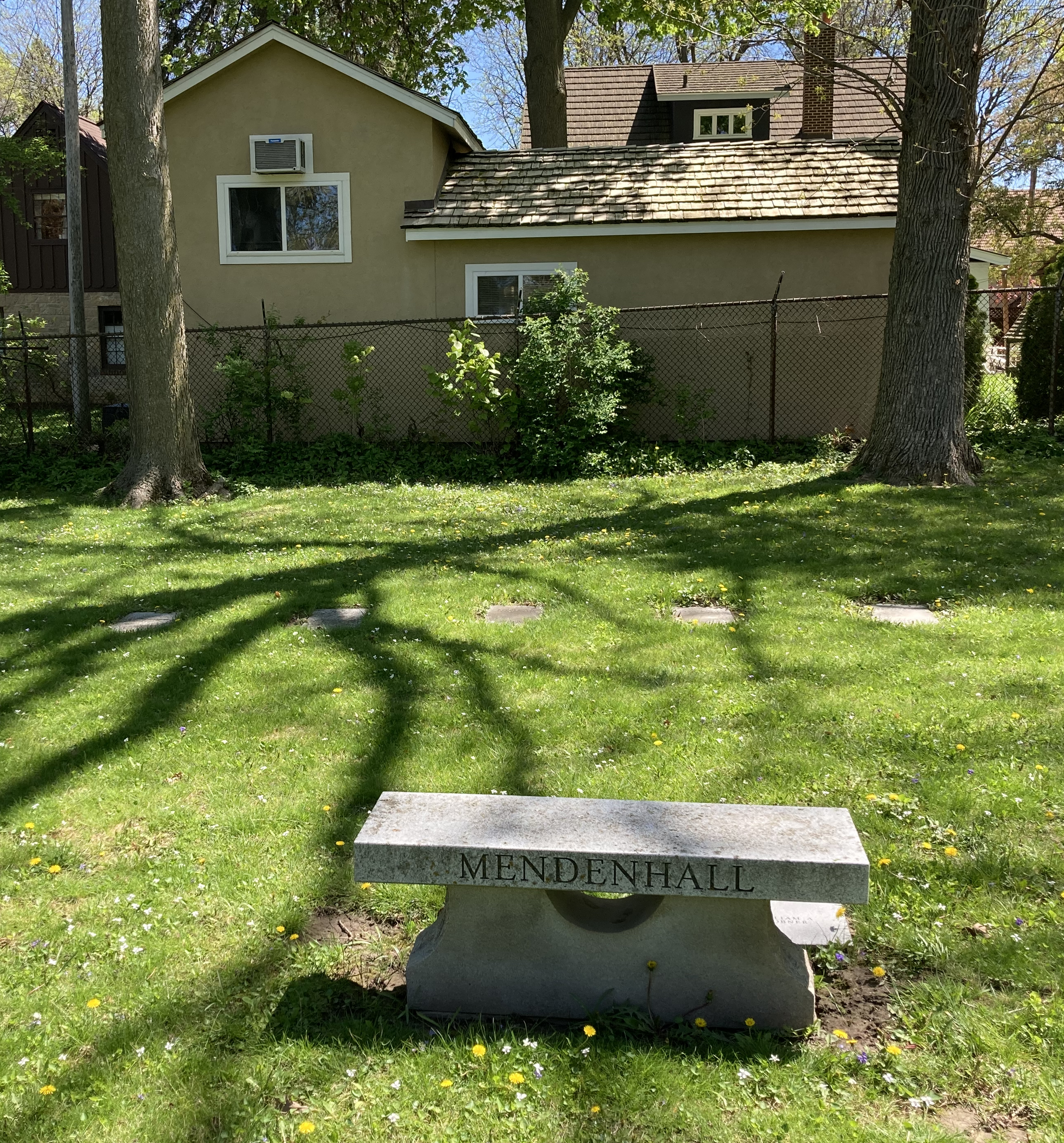
Mendenhall's grave (second from right) at Forest Hill Cemetery

While she was going to school in Baltimore, Mendenhall met her husband, Charles Elwood Mendenhall, and the two were married in 1906 on Valentine's Day. The couple attended Johns Hopkins together and pursued a friendship while they were there. Mendenhall wished to start a life with her husband after years of friendship, and she yearned for a sense of normalcy in her life. After their marriage, the couple moved to Madison, Wisconsin where they both taught at the University of Wisconsin.

Dorothy and Charles Mendenhall had four children. Margaret, their first child, died one day after birth due to delivery complications. Richard, their second child, was born in 1908 and died before his second birthday after falling off the roof of the family home in 1910. The Mendenhall's had two more boys who grew to be healthy and successful. John attended Harvard University and became a renowned physician and faculty member at University of Wisconsin Medical School. Thomas attended and became a professor of history at Yale University, and served as the sixth president of Smith College, his mother's alma mater.

Charles Mendenhall died from prostate cancer in 1935. Dorothy Mendenhall's children and their families remained close to her after his death. She began to travel in places such as Mexico and various parts of Central America. Eventually Mendenhall settled in Chester, Connecticut, where she would spend her last few years. In the 1960s her health began to decline. Dorothy Reed Mendenhall died at the age of eighty-nine in July 1964. Her cause of death was arteriosclerotic heart disease. She was buried at Forest Hill Cemetery in Madison.

== Publications ==
Mendenhall published two books, including Milk: The Indispensable Food for Children and What is Happening to Mothers and Babies in the District of Columbia? Aside from her own two publications, she also wrote six chapters Child Care and Child Welfare: Outlines for Study, which was published by the U.S. Children's Bureau. The Bureau published a third contribution of hers entitled Midwifery in Denmark. These publications were based on the research Mendenhall conducted overseas, as well as here in the U.S., in regard to child nutrition and health.
