= Thomas Herbert Johnson =

American literature scholar (1902-1985)

Thomas H. Johnson
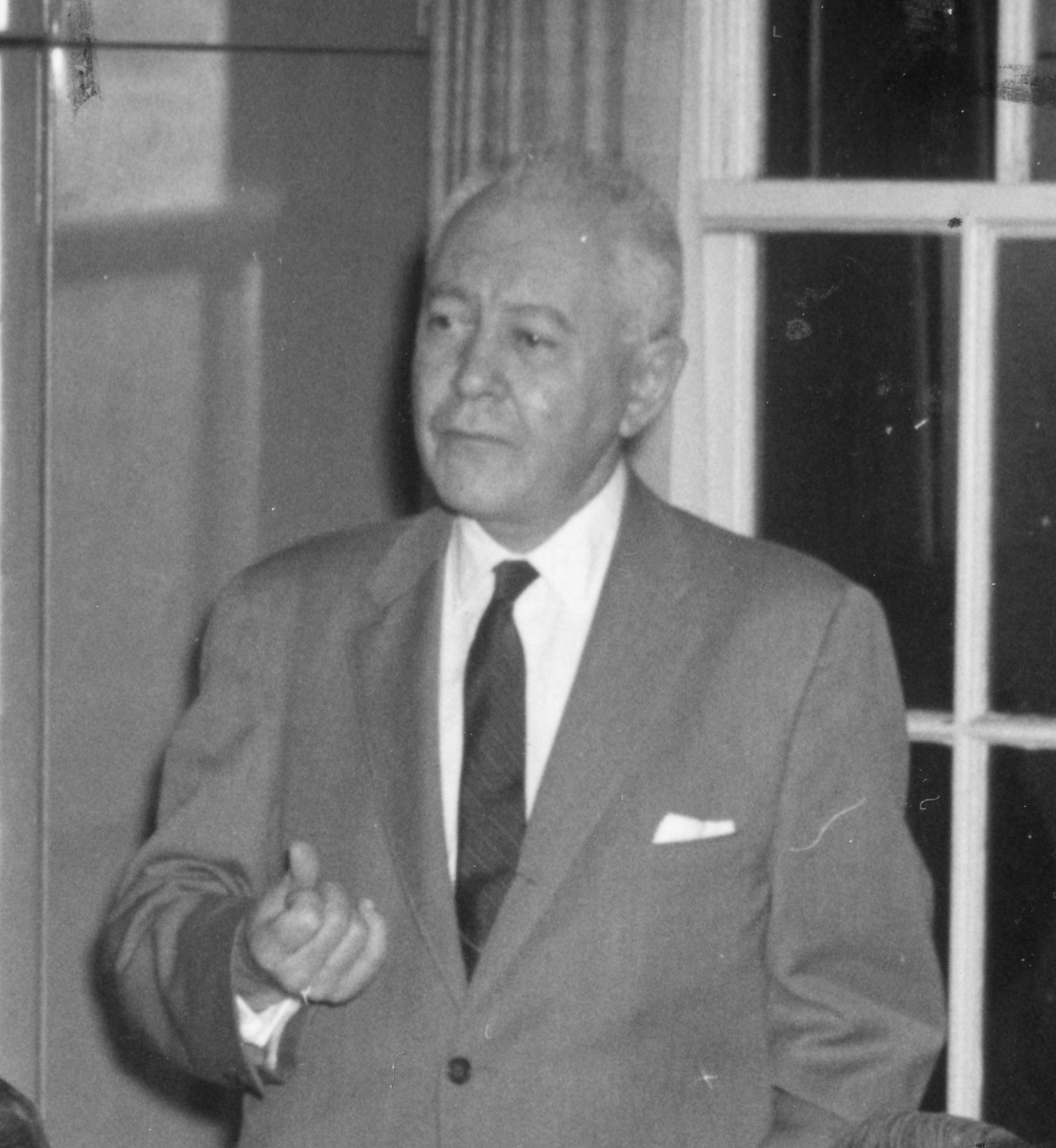
- Born: Thomas Herbert Johnson; April 27, 1902; Bradford, Vermont
- Died: January 3, 1985 (aged 82)
- Known for: Edward Taylor: Poetical Works, Literary History of the United States, The Poems of Emily Dickinson, Emily Dickinson: An Interpretive Biography, The Oxford Companion to American History
- Spouse: Catherine Rice
- Children: Laura Johnson Waterman, Thomas Johnson
- Parent(s): Herbert Thomas Johnson, Myra Johnson
- Awards: The Lawrenceville School Masters Award

Academic background
- Education: Montpelier High School, Dartmouth College, Williams College, Harvard University

Academic work
- Discipline: American literature
- Sub-discipline: Puritan scholar, Emily Dickinson

Thomas Herbert Johnson (April 27, 1902 – January 3, 1985) was an American scholar, teacher, editor, and bibliographer who specialized in American literature.

His primary contributions include the rediscovery of the Puritan poet Edward Taylor (c. 1664–1729), whose poems he edited and published as The Poetical Works of Edward Taylor (1939). Johnson also served as co-editor of Literary History of the United States (1948, 3 vols.), for which he compiled the third volume, the Bibliography; and his editions of the writings of Emily Dickinson (1830–1886) comprising the Poems (1955, 3 vols.) and the Letters (1958, 3 vols.). In 1955, he published Emily Dickinson: An Interpretive Biography. Before Johnson’s work, no accurate and complete edition of Dickinson’s poems or letters had been published. He also authored The Oxford Companion to American History (1966).

== Early life ==
During his first semester as a freshman at Dartmouth College, Johnson failed three of his five courses. Given a second chance, he then took ten courses during the 1920–21 academic year, earning four C’s, three D’s, and three E’s. He then wrote to President Ernest Martin Hopkins requesting another chance. Hopkins responded that, while finding Johnson's letter compelling, he would not deviate from the school's policy. Johnson wrote to Hopkins, “My greatest, my earliest ambition has been swept away from me because of my own carelessness... only I am to blame.” Johnson began teaching at a rural school in Readsboro, Vermont at age 19.

In late 1922, with the help of President Hopkins, Johnson entered Williams College as a freshman. His academic record remained undistinguished until his senior year. By the time Johnson graduated from Williams in 1926, he had been elected to the Gargoyle honors society and served as the president of the college's theatrical group, Cap and Bells.

In 1926–27, Johnson participated as a teacher in an around-the-world academic cruise known as the Floating University. The program, led by a faculty that included Howes of Williams College as one of three deans, brought together more than fifty instructors and approximately 450 students, including 120 women. The initiative was designed to combine formal education with international travel, involving participants from both elite colleges and state universities across the United States, and was regularly covered by the New York Times. During the voyage, Johnson wrote a series of 34 letters addressed primarily to his mother, though also intended for his father, younger brother Edward (“Ned”), and older sister Ruth.

== Early career ==
Thomas Johnson completed his M.A. degree at Harvard University in 1929 and earned a Doctor of Philosophy degree in 1934. He wrote on colonial literature in Jonathan Edwards: Representative Selections, edited with Clarence Faust of the University of Chicago, followed by The Puritans, authored with Perry Miller of Harvard in 1938. According to Kermit Vanderbilt in his American Literature and the Academy, Johnson "made an impact on American literature studies" in 1939, introducing "the scholarly world to the verses of Edward Taylor, four hundred pages of manuscripts that had lain over two centuries in Yale University archives.” Johnson’s scholarship was released as The Poetical Works of Edward Taylor in 1939.

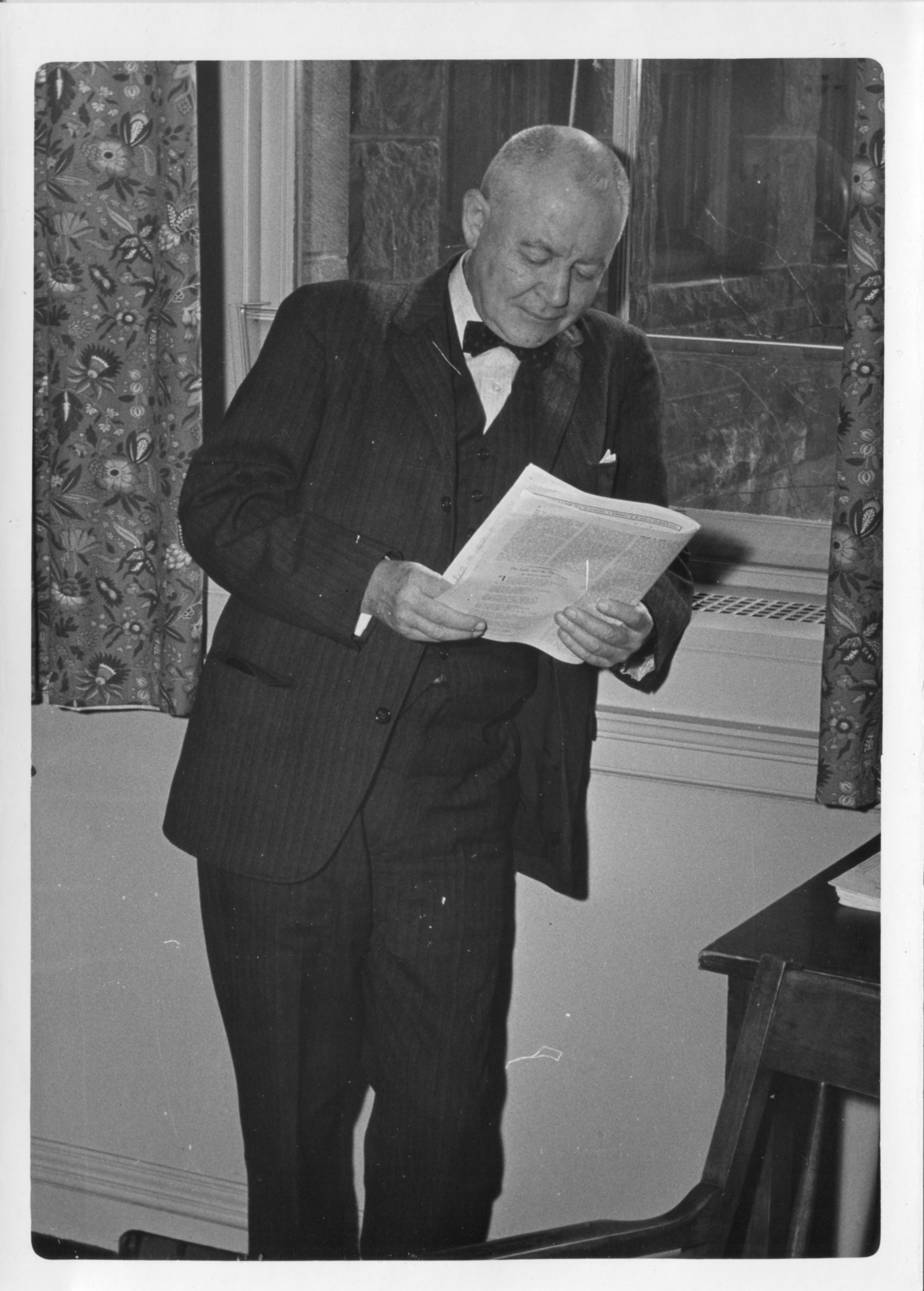
Thomas Johnson reading a newspaper.

He then contributed to Literary History of the United States, which was published in three volumes by Macmillan in 1948, a collaboration with Robert E. Spiller of the University of Pennsylvania, Willard Thorp of Princeton and Henry Seidel Canby, founding editor of the Saturday Review of Literature. Johnson compiled the third volume, Bibliography. Vanderbilt wrote that although “Thomas Johnson was not the foremost bibliographer on the American literature scene when Spiller and Thorp drove down from Princeton to nearby Lawrenceville School in 1942 and persuaded him to join the editorial board in that capacity," Johnson "had more than modest credentials and was, in addition, the foremost scholar of New England literature among all the contributors. He was, in fact, a New Englander....”

The publication of the Literary History helped to establish that America had its own literature, with writers who were distinctly American and wrote on American themes. Subsequently, American professors were invited to European universities to establish courses on American literature.

== Later career ==
Johnson was invited by Harvard University Press to work on a new edition of Emily Dickinson. R. W. Franklin, in his introduction to the 1998 Variorum edition, described Johnson’s 1955 edition as "a landmark in Dickinson studies [...] an outstanding achievement [...] essential to Dickinson scholarship for over forty years."

In 1966, his last work, The Oxford Companion to American History, was published.

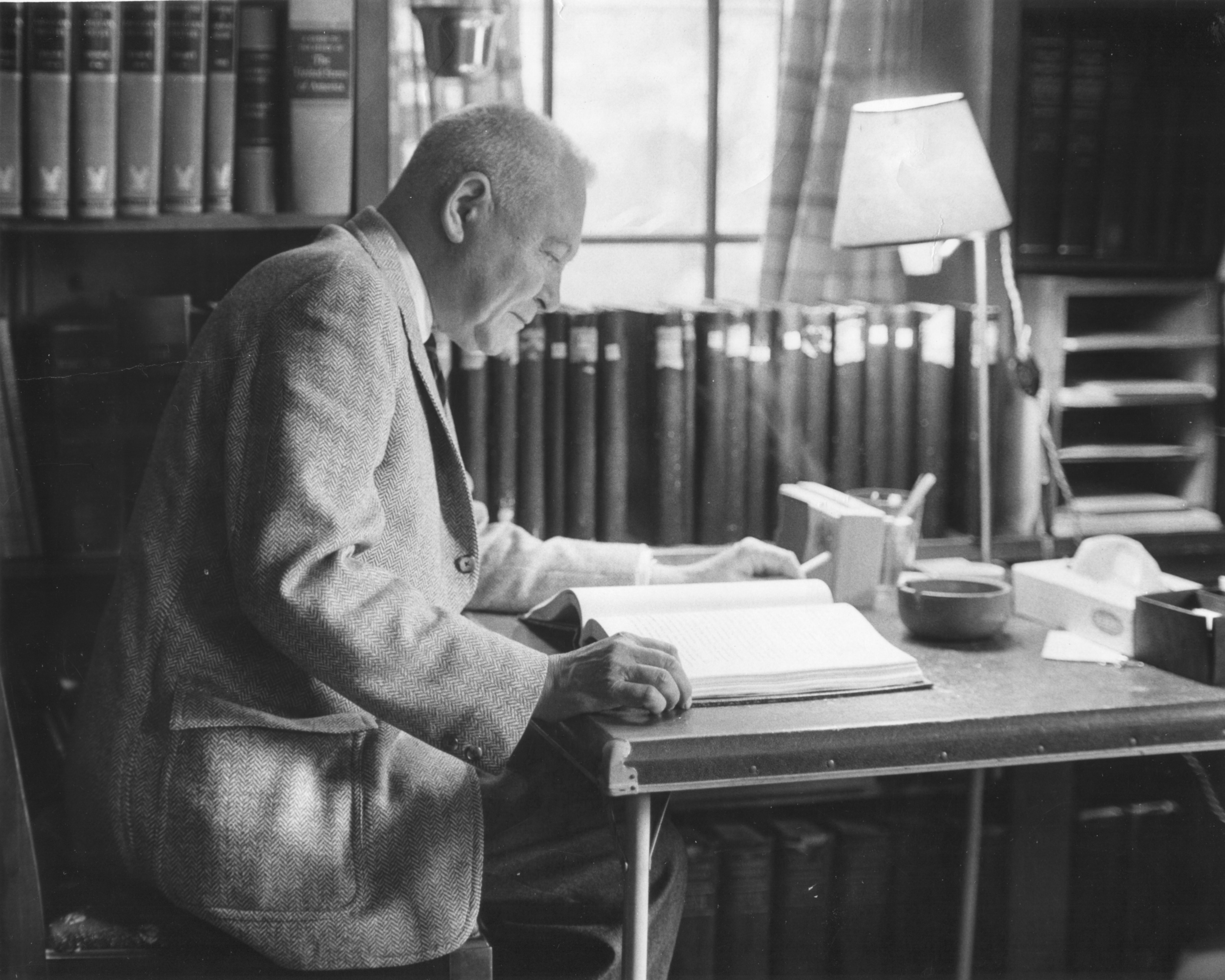
Johnson working in his home study in Lawrenceville, New Jersey

Johnson retired in 1967. Vanderbilt characterized Johnson as having "clearly thrived on the alternation between prep-school instruction and the intense concentration demanded of textual and bibliographical scholarship."
