= Thomas Corwin Mendenhall =

American autodidact physicist and meteorologist (1841–1924)

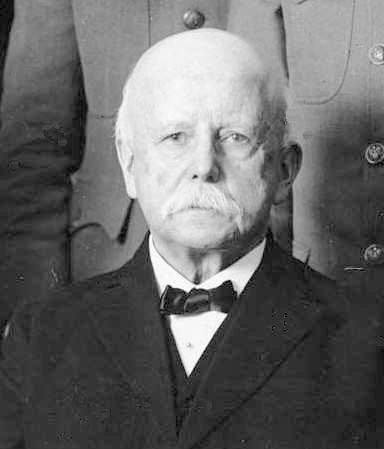
- Born: October 4, 1841; Hanoverton, Ohio, US
- Died: March 28, 1924 (aged 82); Ravenna, Ohio, US
- Resting place: Forest Hill Cemetery
- Education: Ohio State University
- Known for: gravity; physics; stylometry; author profiling
- Spouse: Susan Allan Marple (m. 1870)
- Children: Charles Elwood Mendenhall
- Relatives: Thomas C. Mendenhall (grandson)
- Awards: Cullum Geographical Medal (1901); Franklin Medal (1918); Order of the Sacred Treasure (Japan) (1911)
- Scientific career
- Fields: gravity; physics; seismology; meteorology; stylometry; author profiling

Thomas Corwin Mendenhall (October 4, 1841 – March 23, 1924) was an American autodidact physicist and meteorologist. He was the first professor hired at Ohio State University in 1873 and the superintendent of the United States Coast and Geodetic Survey (one of the ancestor organizations of the National Oceanic and Atmospheric Administration) from 1889 to 1894. Alongside his work, he was also an advocate for the adoption of the metric system by the United States and is the father of author profiling.

== Biography ==
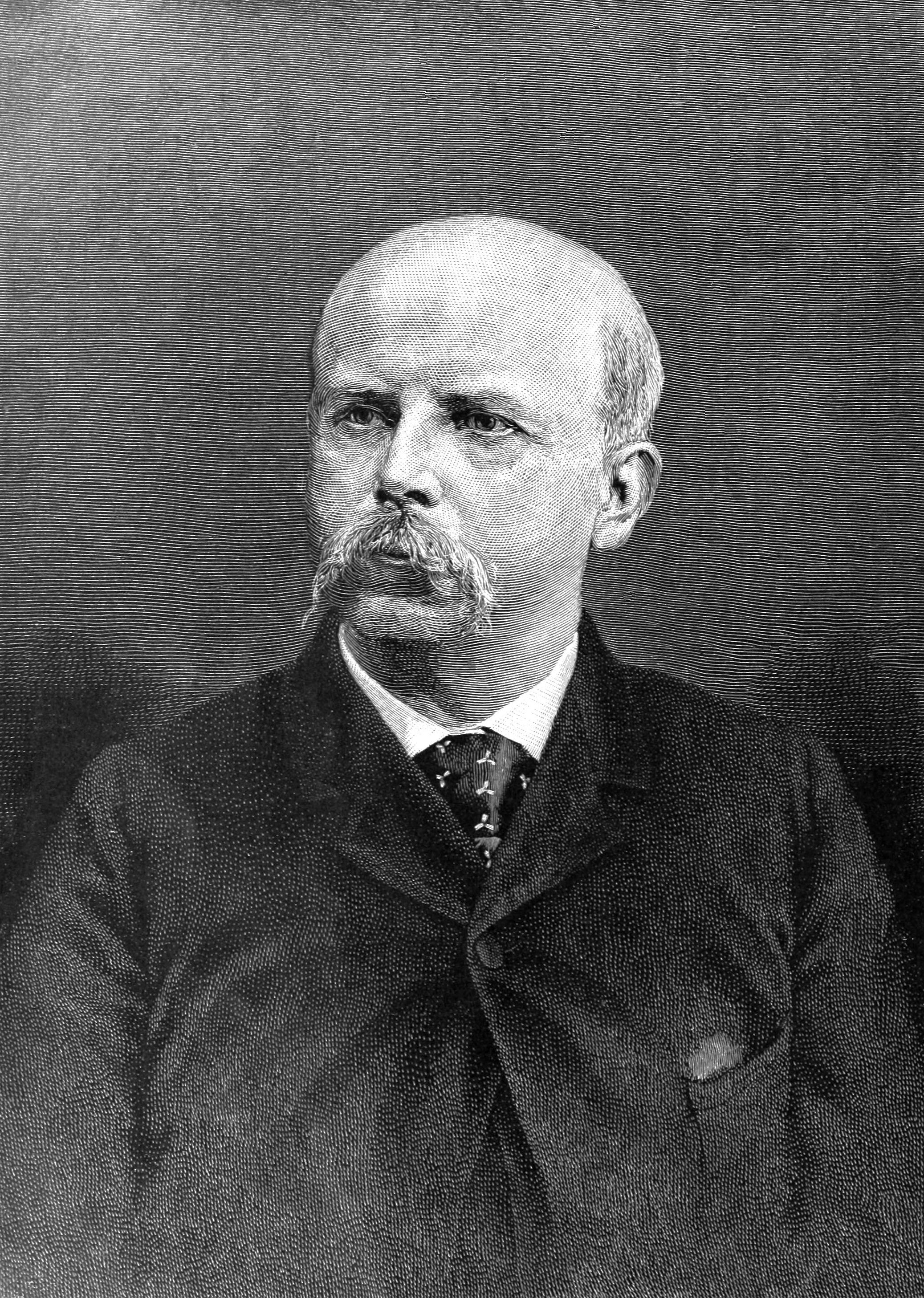
Mendenhall in 1890

Mendenhall was born in Hanoverton, Ohio, to Stephen Mendenhall, a farmer and carriage-maker, and Mary Thomas. In 1852 the family moved to Marlboro, a Quaker community outside of Akron, Ohio. His parents were strong abolitionists and frequently opened their home to escaped slaves heading north along the Underground Railroad. Mendenhall became principal of the local primary school in 1858. He formalized his teaching qualifications at National Normal University in 1861 with an Instructor Normalis degree.

While living in Columbus, Ohio, he married Susan Allan Marple in 1870. The couple had one child, Charles Elwood Mendenhall (1872–1935), teacher and chairman of the physics department at University of Wisconsin–Madison for 34 years.

He taught at a number of schools in Ohio including Central High School in Columbus, gaining an impressive reputation as a teacher and educator. In 1873, although he lacked conventional academic credentials, he was appointed professor of physics and mechanics at the Ohio Agricultural and Mechanical College. The college ultimately became Ohio State University, Mendenhall being the first member of the original faculty. He was later awarded the first ever honorary Ph.D. from The Ohio State University in 1878.

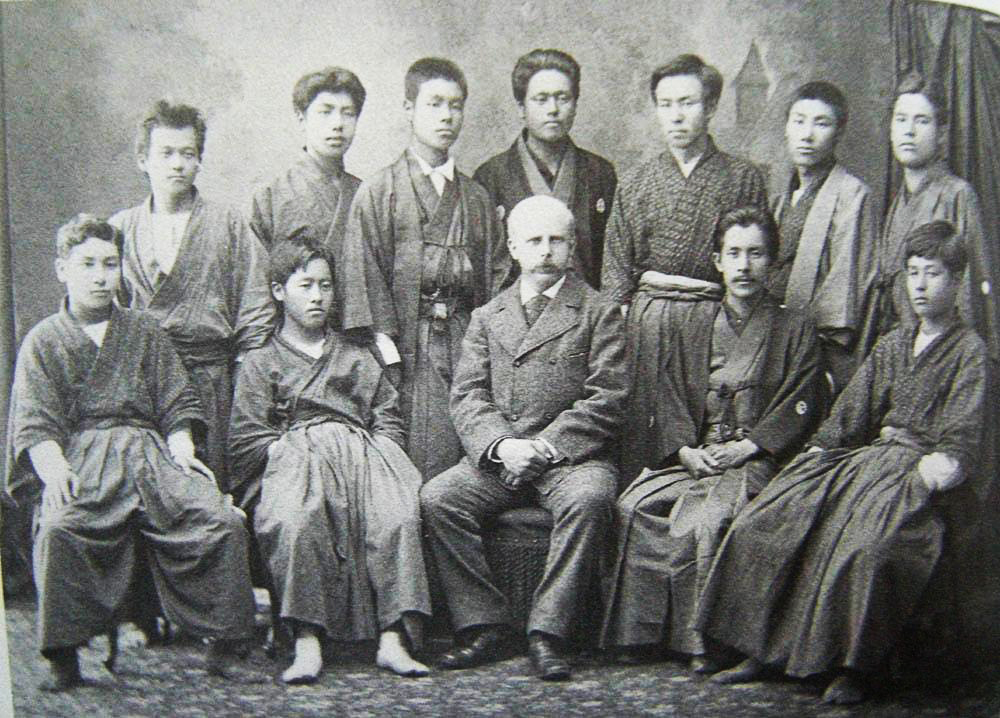
Thomas Corwin Mendenhall, the first physics teacher in Tokyo, Japan with his interpreter Kikuchi (right) and grad students c. 1880

In 1878, on the recommendation of Edward S. Morse, he was recruited to help the modernization of Meiji Era Japan as one of the o-yatoi gaikokujin (hired foreigners), serving as visiting professor of physics at Tokyo Imperial University. In connection with this appointment, he founded a meteorological observatory to make systematic observations during his residence in Japan. From measurements using a Kater's pendulum of the force of gravity at sea level and at the summit of Mount Fuji, Mendenhall deduced a value for the mass of the Earth that agreed closely with estimates that Francis Baily had made in England by another method. He also made a series of elaborate measurements of the wavelengths of the solar spectrum by means of a large spectrometer. He also became interested in earthquakes while in Japan, and was one of the founders of the Seismological Society of Japan (SSJ). During his time in Japan, he also gave public lectures on various scientific topics to general audiences in temples and in theaters.

Returning to Ohio in 1881, Mendenhall was instrumental in developing the Ohio State Meteorological Service. He devised a system of weather signals for display on railroad trains. This method became general throughout the United States and Canada.

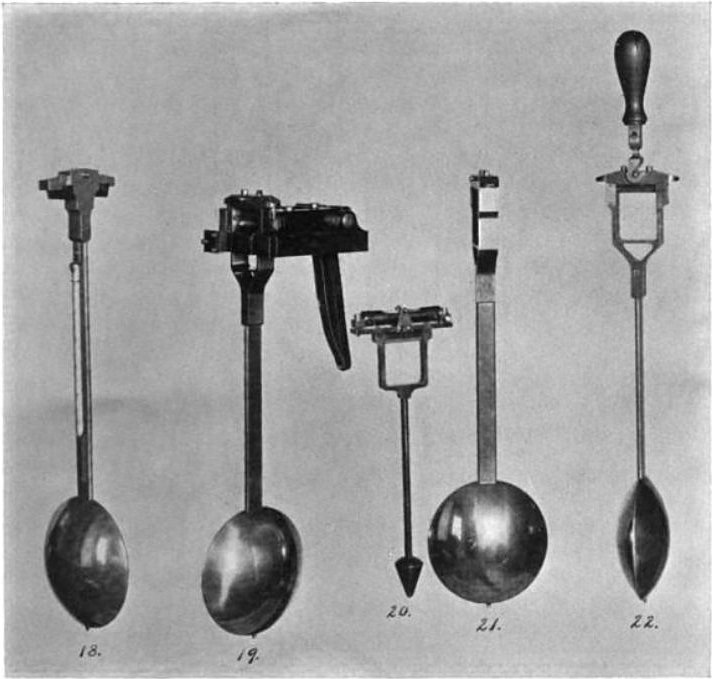
Mendenhall Gravimeter Pendulums

He became professor at the U.S. Signal Corps in 1884, introducing of systematic observations of lightning, and investigating methods for determining ground temperatures. He was the first to establish stations in the United States for the systematic observation of earthquake phenomena. Resigning in 1886, Mendenhall took up the presidency of the Rose Polytechnic Institute in Terre Haute, Indiana before becoming superintendent of the United States Coast and Geodetic Survey in 1889. During his time as superintendent, he issued the Mendenhall Order and oversaw the consequent transition of the United States's weights and measures from the customary system, based on that of England, to the metric system. Mendenhall remained a strong proponent for the official adoption of the metric system all his life. Also, as superintendent of the U.S. Coast and Geodetic Survey, he was also responsible for defining the exact national boundary between Alaska and Canada. The Mendenhall Valley and Glacier in Juneau, Alaska was named for him in 1892.

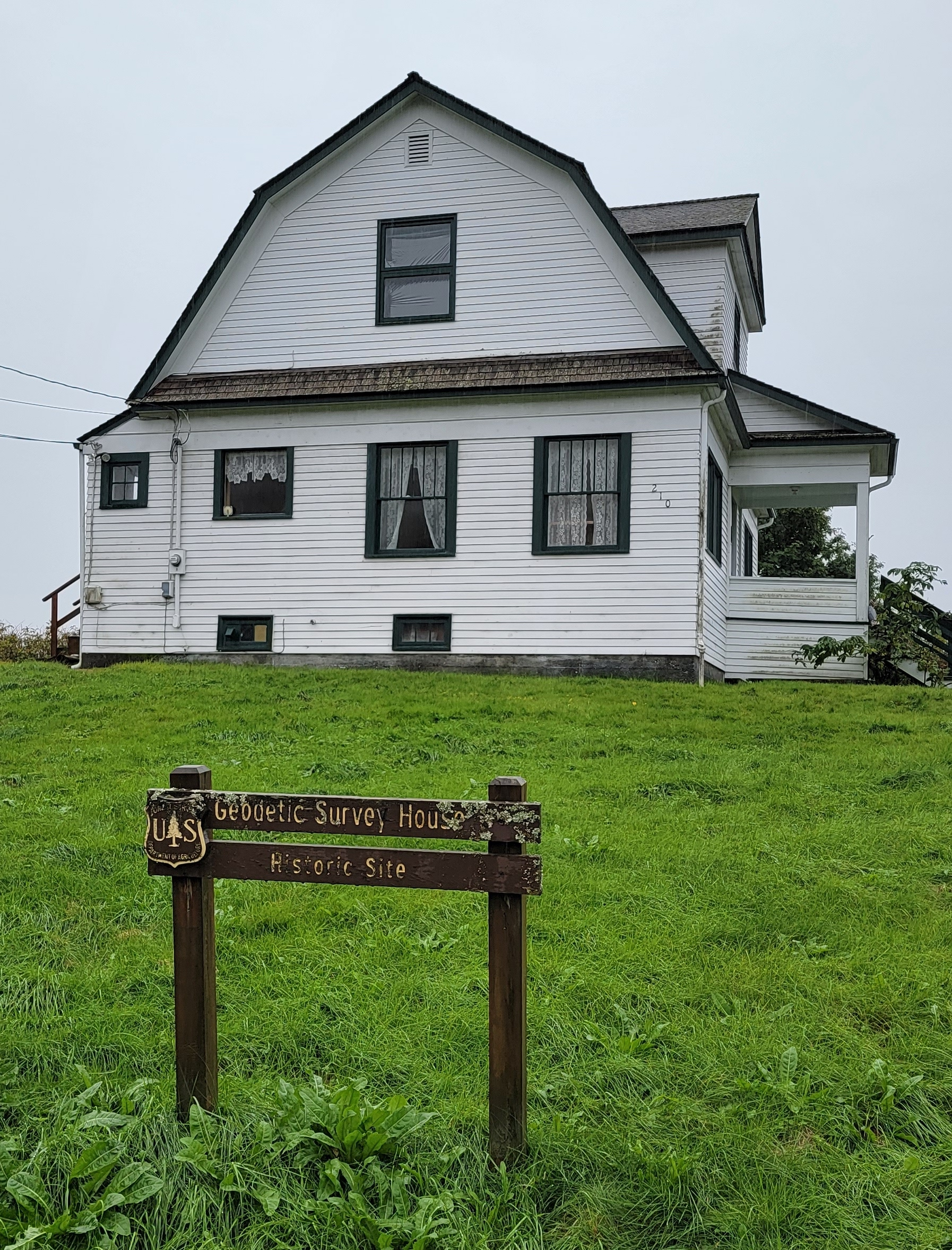
This Geodetic Survey House in Sitka, Alaska was used by Dr. Mendenhall and Surveyors working to map Alaska.

Mendenhall invented the portable Mendenhall Gravimeter in 1890 while he was superintendent of the U.S. Coast and Geodetic Survey, and at that time it provided the most accurate relative measurements of the local gravitational field of the Earth. The gravimeters were used at over 340 survey stations across the US and around the world including Germany, the Netherlands, Java, Philippines, Cuba, Haiti, Bahamas, Dominican Republic, Panama, Canada, and Mexico. The swing of the pendulum was more regular than the most accurate clocks of the era, and as the "world's best clock" it was used by Albert A. Michelson to measure the speed of light, for which he won a Nobel Prize in 1907. An early model of the original 1890s Mendenhall Gravimeter is on display at the Smithsonian Institution in Washington, D.C.

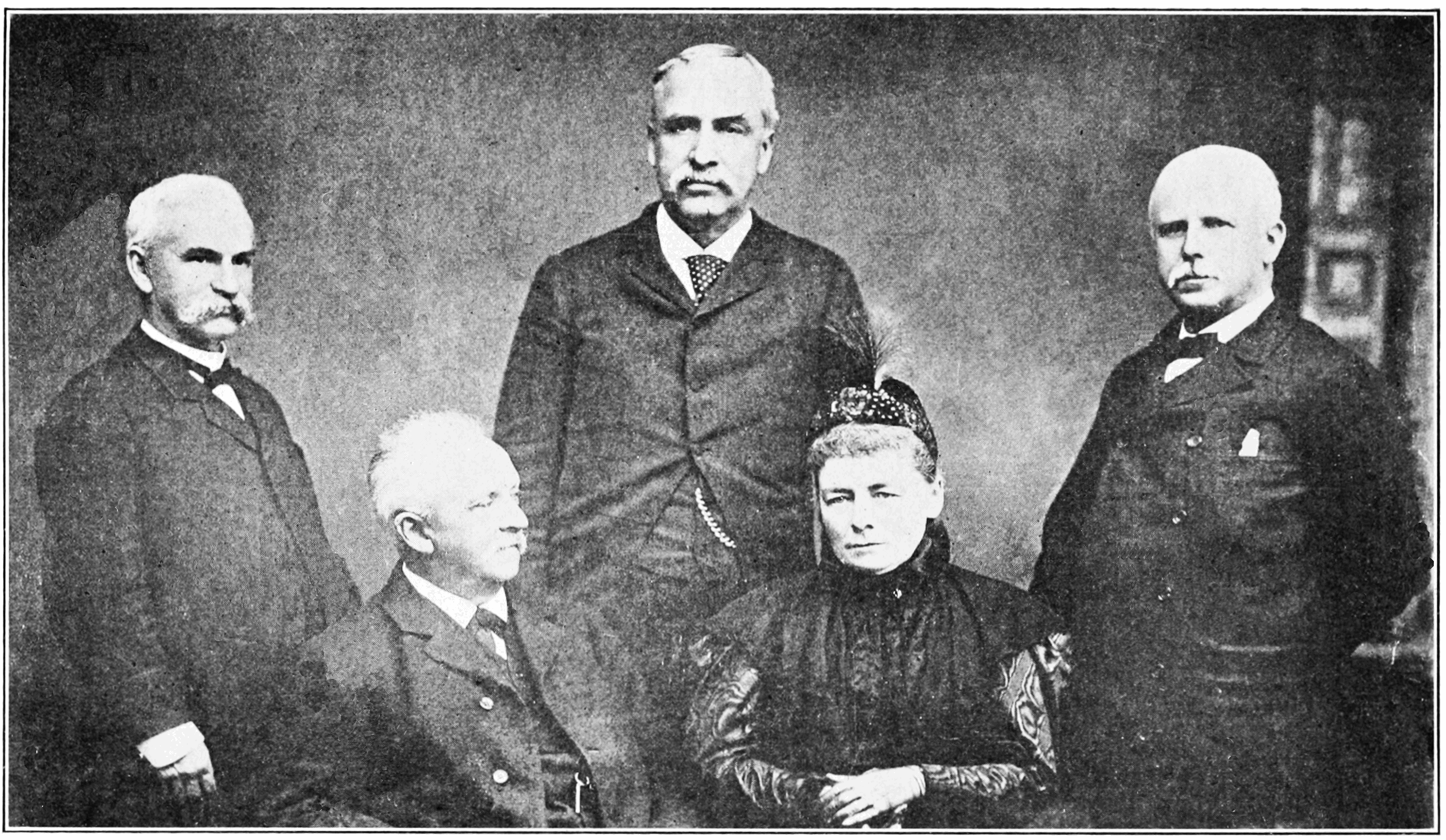
Hermann von Helmholtz and his wife (seated), Hugo Kronecker (left), Henry Villard(center) and Thomas Corwin Mendenhall (right)—taken at the studio of Mathew Brady in New York City, 1893

Mendenhall was appointed president of the Worcester Polytechnic Institute from 1894 until 1901, when he emigrated to Europe. He returned to the United States in 1912. He was appointed to the board of trustees of the Ohio State University in 1919 and is remembered for his successful efforts to close the College of Homeopathic Medicine and his unsuccessful effort to limit the capacity of Ohio Stadium to 45,000 seats, contending that it would never be able to fill to its design capacity of 63,000 seats. He continued to serve as a trustee until his death at Ravenna, Ohio in 1924. He was buried at Forest Hill Cemetery in Madison, Wisconsin.

His portrait is currently part of the Smithsonian Institution National Portrait Gallery in Washington, D.C. It was painted by his former pupil Annie Ware Sabine Siebert, who was the first recipient of a Master of Arts degree from The Ohio State University in 1886, and one of the first women to earn an architecture degree from the Massachusetts Institute of Technology (MIT) in 1888. A portrait by famous artist and Columbus, Ohio native George Bellows was commissioned by the Ohio State University in 1913.

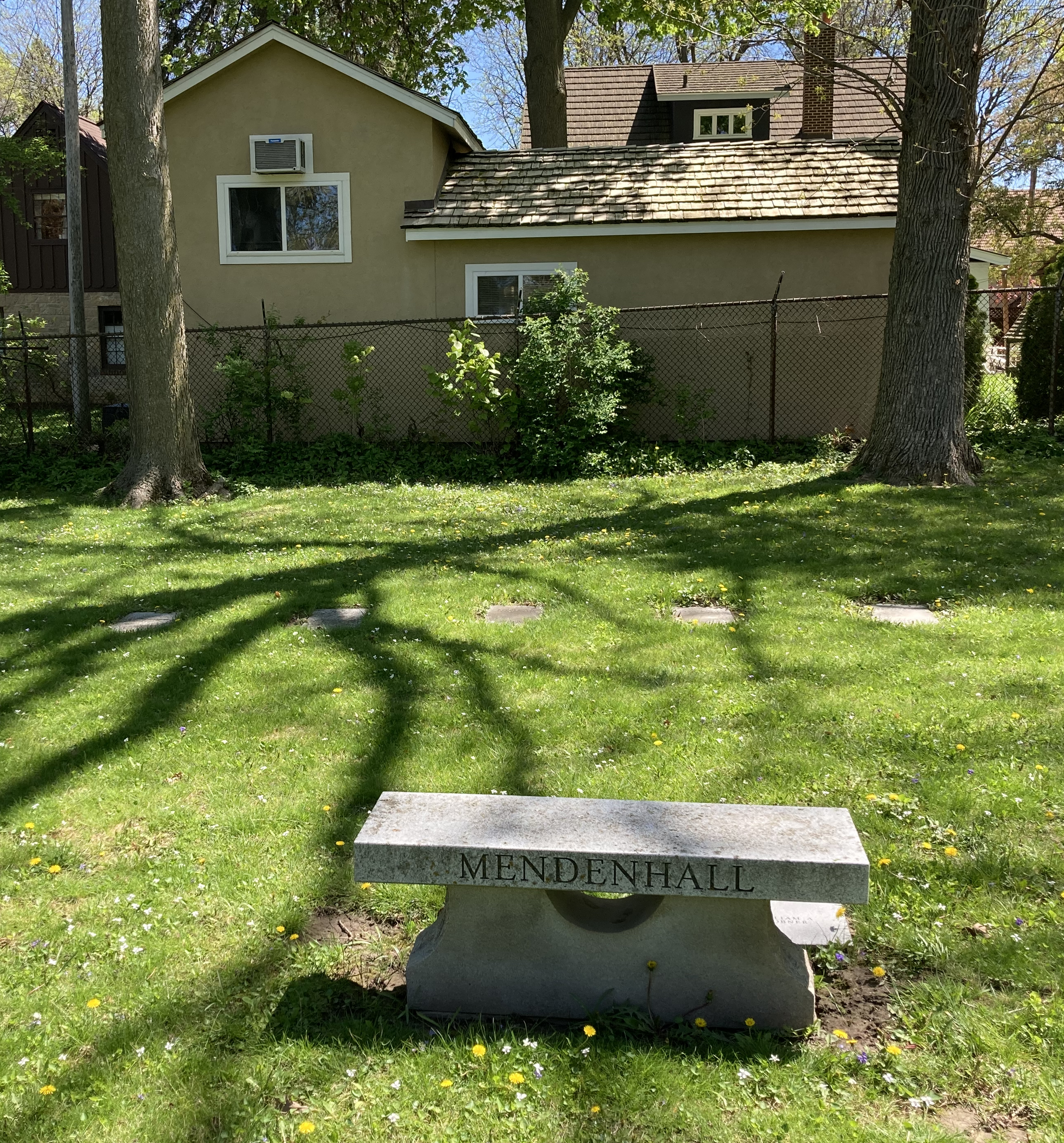
Mendenhall's grave (third from left) at Forest Hill Cemetery

The largest collection of images, historical documents and handwritten material relating to Thomas Corwin Mendenhall is with Mendenhall family member documentary filmmaker Sybil Drew.

== Work on stylometry ==
In 1887 Mendenhall published one of the earliest attempts at stylometry also known as author profiling, the quantitative analysis of writing style. Prompted by a suggestion made by the English mathematician Augustus De Morgan in 1851, Mendenhall attempted to characterize the style of different authors through the frequency distribution of words of various lengths. In this article Mendenhall mentioned the possible relevance of this technique to the Shakespeare authorship question, and several years later the idea was picked up by a supporter of the theory that Sir Francis Bacon was the true author of the works usually attributed to Shakespeare. He paid for a team of two people to undertake the counting required, but the results did not appear to support the theory. For comparison, in 1901 Mendenhall also had works by Christopher Marlowe analysed, and proponents of the Marlovian theory of Shakespeare authorship welcomed his finding that "in the characteristic curve of his plays Christopher Marlowe agrees with Shakespeare about as well as Shakespeare agrees with himself."

== Honors ==
Mendenhall Glacier in Juneau, Alaska

- Honorary Ph.D. from The Ohio State University (1878)
- Honorary Ph.D. from University of Michigan (1887)
- Member of the National Academy of Sciences (1887)
- President of the American Association for the Advancement of Science (1889)
- Elected member of the American Academy of Arts and Sciences (1891)
- The Mendenhall Valley and Mendenhall Glacier in Juneau, Alaska were named for him (1892)
- Elected a member of the American Antiquarian Society (1895)
- Elected member of the American Philosophical Society (1899)
- Cullum Geographical Medal of the American Geographical Society (1901)
- Order of the Sacred Treasure, Japan (1911)
- Honorary Ph.D. from Case Western Reserve University (1912)
- Franklin Medal (1918)
- Mendenhall Laboratory on the campus of the Ohio State University is named for him

== Bibliography ==
- Mendenhall, T. C. (1887). A Century of Electricity. New York: Houghton, Mifflin and Co.
- Mendenhall, T. C. (1887). "The Characteristic Curves of Composition". Science. IX (214): 237–248. doi:10.1126/science.ns-9.214s.237. PMID 17736020.
- Mendenhall, T. C. (1901). "A Mechanical Solution of a Literary Problem". The Popular Science Monthly. LX (7): 97–105.
- Mendenhall, Thomas Corwin and Drew, Sybil (2017) "An American Scientist In Japan 1878-1881 And Japan Revisited After Thirty Years" ISBN 978-1544897066
- Mendenhall, Thomas Corwin and Drew, Sybil (2017) "The Alaska Boundary Line And Twenty Unsettled Miles: The History Of St. Croix River" ISBN 978-1544637891

== Notes ==
Government offices
Preceded by Frank Manly Thorn	Superintendent, United States Coast and Geodetic Survey; 1889–1894	Succeeded by William Ward Duffield
