= Thomas C. Mendenhall (historian) =

American historian

- Born: Thomas Corwin Mendenhall II; July 10, 1910; Madison, Wisconsin, U.S.
- Died: July 18, 1998 (aged 88); Martha's Vineyard, Massachusetts, U.S.
- Spouse: Cornelia Isabel Baker (m. 1938)
- Children: 3
- Relatives: Dorothy Reed Mendenhall (mother); Charles Elwood Mendenhall (father); Thomas Corwin Mendenhall (grandfather)

Academic background
- Education: Yale University; Balliol College (B.Litt.)

Academic work
- Discipline: History
- Institutions: Yale University; Smith College

Thomas Corwin Mendenhall II (July 10, 1910, in Madison, Wisconsin – July 18, 1998, on Martha's Vineyard, Massachusetts) was a professor of history at Yale University, the sixth President of Smith College, and the leading authority on the history of collegiate rowing in the United States.

== Early life and education ==
The grandson and namesake of Thomas Corwin Mendenhall (1841–1924), physicist and meteorologist, his father was a professor of physics at the University of Wisconsin–Madison, Charles Elwood Mendenhall (1872–1935), and his mother, Dorothy Reed Mendenhall (1874–1964), a well-known pediatrician. The young Thomas Mendenhall grew up in Madison, Wisconsin, and went to Andover before graduating from Yale University in 1932. At Yale, he served on the business staff of campus humor magazine The Yale Record. Awarded a Rhodes Scholarship, he attended Balliol College, Oxford, from 1935 to 1936, earning a B.Litt. degree. While at Oxford, he was captain of the Balliol Boats. Mendenhall returned to Yale, where he wrote his doctoral dissertation on the Welsh wool trade in the 16th and 17th centuries, receiving his Ph.D. in history in 1938. As a graduate student, he rowed on the Berkeley College (Yale) intramural crew.

== Personal life ==
He married Cornelia Isabel Baker on June 4, 1938. Together, they had three daughters, including Bethany and Cornelia.

== Professional career ==
In 1937, Mendenhall was appointed an instructor in history at Yale University, promoted to assistant professor in 1942, and then to associate professor in 1946. He served additionally as assistant to the provost at Yale from 1943 to 1950; director of foreign area studies (1944–1946); director Office Teacher Training (1958–1959), and Master of Berkeley College (1950–1959). from 1951 to 1952, he became the first occupant of the academic chair at the United States Naval War College that in 1953 would be named and carry the title of Ernest J. King Professor of Maritime History. While teaching in the Yale History Department between 1937 and 1959, he served on the university's Rowing Committee, and for thirty years was a reporter on rowing events for the Yale Alumni Magazine. He also wrote numerous articles on the history of crew and collegiate rowing for The Oarsman.

In 1959, he was named Professor of History and President of Smith College, retaining that post until his retirement in 1975.

Mendenhall's collection of his correspondence, research materials, and writings on the history of collegiate rowing (24 feet or 7.3 meters) is deposited in the G. W. Blunt White Library at Mystic Seaport. His personal papers and his official papers as president of Smith College (Record Group 32) are located in the Five Colleges Archives and Manuscript Collections at Smith College.

== Death ==
Mendenhall died on July 18, 1998, in Martha's Vineyard.

== Published works ==
• Ideas and institutions in European history, 800–1715; select problems in historical interpretation, edited by Thomas C. Mendenhall, Basil D. Henning, and A. S. Foord. (1948) • Quest for a principle of authority in Europe, 1715–present; select problems in historical interpretation, edited by Thomas C. Mendenhall, Basil D. Henning, and Archibald S. Foord. With the collaboration of Gordon A. Crag and Leonard Krieger, (1948) • Report of the sophomore year of directed studies (1949) • Dynamic force of liberty in modern Europe; six problems in historical interpretation, by Thomas C. Mendenhall, Basil D. Henning, and Archibald S. Foord (1952) • Foundations of the modern state; four problems in historical interpretation by Thomas C. Mendenhall, Basil D. Henning, and Archibald S. Foord (1952) • Historical revisions: The Peace of Augburg by Archibald S. Foord, The Edict of Nantes by T.C. Mendenhall (1952) • Shrewsbury Drapers and the Welsh Wool Trade in the XVII and XVII centuries, (1953) • Eulogy, given on April 22, 1954 [at] a memorial service for Henry Bunting ... held in Dwight memorial chapel on the Yale campus (1954) • Select problems in Western civilization by Thomas C. Mendenhall [and others] (1956) • Have oar, will travel, or, A short history of the Yale crew of 1956, (1957) • Paintings from Smith alumnae collections; an exhibition presented in honor of Thomas Corwin Mendenhall on the occasion of his inauguration as sixth president of the college, October 14 – November 18, 1959 (1959) • Inauguration of Thomas Corwin Mendenhall president of Smith College October 15, 1959, an address, (1959) • Chance and change in Smith College's first century (1976) • A Short History of American Rowing, (1981) • Making history come alive: the place of history in the schools, by James Howard and Thomas Mendenhall; report of the History Commission of the Council for Basic Education (1982) • Harvard–Yale boat race, 1852–1924, and the coming of sport to the American college (1993)
