= Vlado Keselj =

Serbian-Canadian computer scientist

Vlado Keselj (Vlado Kešelj) is a Serbian-Canadian computer scientist known for his research in natural language processing and authorship attribution. He is a professor at Dalhousie University.

== Education ==
As a high school student in Yugoslavia, Keselj competed in the 1987 International Mathematical Olympiad, earning a bronze medal. He earned his Ph.D. in 2002 at the University of Waterloo, with the dissertation Modular Stochastic HPSGs for Question Answering supervised by Nick Cercone.

== Awards ==
Vlado Keselj is a recipient of the 2019 CAIAC Distinguished Service Award, awarded by the Canadian Artificial Intelligence Association (CAIAC).

== Selected publications ==
- Kešelj, V., Peng, F., Cercone, N., & Thomas, C. (2003, August). N-gram-based author profiles for authorship attribution. In Proceedings of the Conference of the Pacific Association for Computational Linguistics, PACLING 2003 (Vol. 3, pp. 255–264).
