= Code stylometry =

Application of stylometry to computer code

Code stylometry (also known as program authorship attribution or source code authorship analysis) is the application of stylometry to computer code to attribute authorship to anonymous binary or source code. It often involves breaking down and examining the distinctive patterns and characteristics of the programming code and then comparing them to computer code whose authorship is known. Unlike software forensics, code stylometry attributes authorship for purposes other than intellectual property infringement, including plagiarism detection, copyright investigation, and authorship verification.

== History ==
In 1989, researchers Paul Oman and Curtis Cook identified the authorship of 18 different Pascal programs written by six authors by using “markers” based on typographic characteristics.

In 1998, researchers Stephen MacDonell, Andrew Gray, and Philip Sallis developed a dictionary-based author attribution system called IDENTIFIED (Integrated Dictionary-based Extraction of Non-language-dependent Token Information for Forensic Identification, Examination, and Discrimination) that determined the authorship of source code in computer programs written in C++. The researchers noted that authorship can be identified using degrees of flexibility in the writing style of the source code, such as:

- The way the algorithm in the source code solves the given problem
- The way the source code is laid out (spacing, indentation, bordering characteristics, standard headings, etc.)
- The way the algorithm is implemented in the source code

The IDENTIFIED system attributed authorship by first merging all the relevant files to produce a single source code file and then subjecting it to a metrics analysis by counting the number of occurrences for each metric. In addition, the system was language-independent due to its ability to create new dictionary files and meta-dictionaries.

In 1999, a team of researchers led by Stephen MacDonell tested the performance of three different program authorship discrimination techniques on 351 programs written in C++ by 7 different authors. The researchers compared the effectiveness of using a feed-forward neural network (FFNN) that was trained on a back-propagation algorithm, multiple discriminant analysis (MDA), and case-based reasoning (CBR). At the end of the experiment, both the neural network and the MDA had an accuracy rate of 81.1%, while the CBR reached an accuracy performance of 88.0%.

In 2005, researchers from the Laboratory of Information and Communication Systems Security at Aegean University introduced a language-independent method of program authorship attribution where they used byte-level n-grams to classify a program to an author. This technique scanned the files and then created a table of different n-grams found in the source code and the number of times they appear. In addition, the system could operate with limited numbers of training examples from each author. However, the more source code programs that were present for each author, the more reliable the author attribution. In an experiment testing their approach, the researchers found that classification using n-grams reached an accuracy rate of up to 100%, although the rate declined drastically if the profile size exceeded 500 and the n-gram size was 3 or less.

In 2011, researchers from the University of Wisconsin created a program authorship attribution system that identified a programmer based on the binary code of a program instead of the source code. The researchers utilized machine learning and training code to determine which characteristics of the code would be helpful in describing the programming style. In an experiment testing the approach on a set of programs written by 10 different authors, the system achieved an accuracy rate of 81%. When tested using a set of programs written by almost 200 different authors, the system performed with an accuracy rate of 51%.

In 2015, a team of postdoctoral researchers from Princeton University, Drexel University, the University of Maryland, and the University of Goettingen as well as researchers from the U.S. Army Research Laboratory developed a program authorship attribution system that could determine the author of a program from a sample pool with programs written by 1,600 coders with a 94 percent accuracy. The methodology consisted of four steps:

1. Disassembly - The program is disassembled to obtain information on its characteristics.
2. Decompilation - The program is converted into a variant of C-like pseudocode through decompilation to obtain abstract syntax trees.
3. Dimensionality reduction - The most relevant and useful features for author identification are selected.
4. Classification - A random-forest classifier attributes the authorship of the program.

This approach analyzed various characteristics of the code, such as blank space, the use of tabs and spaces, and the names of variables, and then used a method of evaluation called a syntax tree analysis that translated the sample code into tree-like diagrams that displayed the structural decisions involved in writing the code. The design of these diagrams prioritized the order of the commands and the depths of the functions that were nestled in the code.

== The 2014 Sony Pictures hacking attack ==
U.S. intelligence officials were able to determine that the 2014 cyber attack on Sony Pictures was sponsored by North Korea after evaluating the software, techniques, and network sources. The attribution was made after cybersecurity experts noticed similarities between the code used in the attack and a malicious software known as Shamoon, which was used in the 2013 attacks against South Korean banks and broadcasting companies by North Korea.
