= Walter Daelemans =

Belgian computational linguist (born 1960)

- Born: June 3, 1960 (age 65); Deurne (Antwerp), Belgium
- Education: University of Antwerp; Katholieke Universiteit Leuven
- Known for: Memory-based learning, stylometry
- Scientific career
- Fields: Computational Linguistics
- Institutions: Tilburg University; University of Antwerp
- Thesis: Studies in Language Technology: An Object-Oriented Computer Model of Morpho-phonological Aspects of Dutch (1987)
- Doctoral advisor: Flip Droste; Gerard Kempen
- Other academic advisors: Luc Steels
- Website: www.clips.ua.ac.be/~walter%20www.clips.ua.ac.be/~walter

Walter Daelemans (born June 3, 1960) is professor in computational linguistics at the University of Antwerp. He is also a research director of the Computational Linguistics and Psycholinguistics Research Center (CLiPS).

== Education and career ==
Daelemans holds a Ph.D. from the Katholieke Universiteit Leuven.

Daelemans pioneered the use of machine learning techniques, especially memory-based learning, in natural language processing in Europe in the early 1990s. Together with Antal van den Bosch he wrote the book Memory-Based Language Processing and developed the software package TiMBL. This was during his time as a professor at Tilburg University where he founded the research group Induction of Linguistic Knowledge (ILK).

== Honors ==
In 2003 he was elected Fellow of ECCAI (the European Coordinating Committee for Artificial Intelligence), “for pioneering work in the field of Artificial Intelligence and outstanding service for the European Artificial Intelligence Community”. In 2014, he was named a fellow of the Association for Computational Linguistics.
