= Writer invariant =

Writer invariant, also called authorial invariant or author's invariant, is a property of a text which is invariant of its author, that is, it will be similar in all texts of a given author and different in texts of different authors. It can be used to find plagiarism or discover who is real author of anonymously published text. Writer invariant is also an author's pattern of writing a letter in handwritten text recognition.

While it is generally recognised that writer invariants exist, it is not agreed what properties of a text should be used. Among the first ones used was distribution of word lengths; other proposed invariants include average sentence length, average word length, noun, verb or adjective usage frequency, vocabulary richness, and frequency of function words, or specific function words.

Of these, average sentence lengths can be very similar in works of different authors or vary significantly even within a single work; average word lengths likewise turn out to be very similar in works of different authors. Analysis of function words shows promise because they are used by authors unconsciously.

== See also ==
- Stylometry
- Writeprint
