= Arthur Phillips =

American novelist

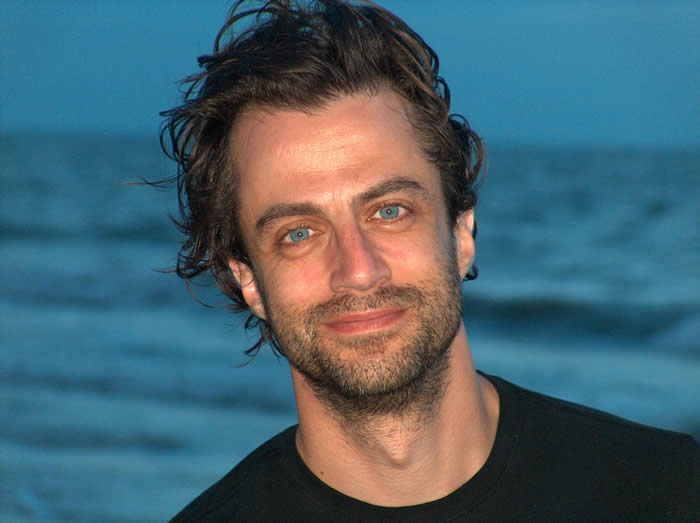
- Born: April 23, 1969 (age 57); Minneapolis, Minnesota, U.S.
- Education: Harvard University (BA); Berklee College of Music
- Occupation: Novelist
- Spouse: Barbara Muschietti
- Writing career
- Language: English
- Genre: Literary fiction
- Notable works: Prague, The Egyptologist, Angelica, The Song Is You, The Tragedy of Arthur, The King at the Edge of the World
- Notable awards: Art Seidenbaum Award for First Fiction (2003), New York Times Notable Book of the Year (2007 and 2009), Washington Post Best Fiction (2007)
- Website: www.arthurphillips.info

Arthur Phillips (born April 23, 1969) is an American novelist. His books include Prague (2002), The Egyptologist (2004), Angelica (2007), The Song Is You (2009), The Tragedy of Arthur (2011), and The King at the Edge of the World (2020).

== Life ==
Arthur Peter Monroe Phillips was born in Minneapolis, Minnesota. He is Jewish. He received a BA in history from Harvard University in 1990. After spending two years in Budapest (1990–1992), he then studied jazz saxophone for four semesters at Berklee College of Music (1992–93).

In several interviews, Phillips has stated he has been a child actor, a jazz musician, a speechwriter, an advertising copywriter for medical devices, and a "dismally failed entrepreneur."

Phillips lived in Budapest from 1990 to 1992 and in Paris from 2001 to 2003, and now lives in New York. He was featured on the July 27, 2007, episode of This American Life, reading his short story "Wenceslas Square." The story is being produced for film by Amazon Studios, with a script by Phillips, to be directed by Sophia Takal.

Phillips was a five-time champion on Jeopardy! in 1997. In 2005, he competed in the Jeopardy! Ultimate Tournament of Champions. He won his opening-round game but lost in the second round.

Phillips is married to film producer Barbara Muschietti.

== Works ==
=== Prague (2002) ===
Prague, despite its title, is set almost entirely in Budapest, Hungary, primarily in 1990, with an interlude detailing several previous generations of Hungarian history, from the Austro-Hungarian monarchy through the First and Second World Wars.

The main line of the novel follows a group of young Western expatriates through their lives in Budapest. The structure of the novel allows for various tales to be interwoven, producing an ensemble portrait of them and their adopted city, just recovering from decades of Communism, fascism, and war. The novel's recurring themes include nostalgia, sincerity and authenticity, and young people's first search for meaning in life. The novel was well received commercially and critically, winning Phillips a 2003 Los Angeles Times/Art Seidenbaum Award for Best First Fiction, as well as other honors.

=== The Egyptologist (2004) ===
The Egyptologist is structured as journals, letters, telegrams, and drawings, from several different points of view. The main story is set in 1922 and follows a hopeful explorer who, working near Howard Carter (the man who discovered the tomb of King Tutankhamun), risks more and more of his life and savings on an apparently quixotic effort to find the tomb of an apocryphal Egyptian king.

The book was an international bestseller and critical success in more than two dozen countries. US critics noted Phillips's versatility in producing a book so different from his first, and fans of the book included Gary Shteyngart, George Saunders, Elizabeth Peters, and Stephen King. Others, however, most notably Michiko Kakutani of The New York Times, found the book overlong and confusing.

=== Angelica (2007) ===
Angelica is superficially a Victorian ghost story, and won Phillips comparisons to Henry James, Vladimir Nabokov, and Stephen King. The Washington Post'' opined that the novel cemented Phillips' reputation as "one of the best writers in America".

In the novel, the same events are retold four times from four different perspectives, each section casting doubt on the version that came before, until the reader is left to sort truth from fantasy on his or her own. The novel has been made into a film by Mitchell Lichtenstein with a release date in late 2017.

=== The Song Is You (2009) ===
Phillips' fourth novel tells the story of a middle-aged man's pursuit of a young woman, an Irish pop singer performing in a bar. According to a review at Bookpage

"Set in New York, the story follows Julian Donahue as he navigates the shadowy, grief-filled world of a parent who has lost a child [...] He's consumed by [the singer], but rather than introducing himself as another disposable fan, he becomes a faraway mentor and muse, setting himself on a course that will lead him from New York to Europe."

The novel was published on April 7, 2009. Preliminary reviews included a blurb from Kurt Andersen and this notice from Kirkus Reviews: "Phillips still looks like the best American novelist to have emerged during the present decade."
