= Writeprint =

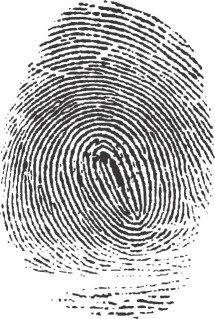
A "writeprint" is a play on the word for fingerprint, as both are a method of identification in law enforcement.

Writeprint is a method in forensic linguistics of establishing author identification over the internet, likened to a digital fingerprint. Identity is established through a comparison of distinguishing stylometric characteristics of an unknown written text with known samples of the suspected author (writer invariants). Even without a suspect, writeprint provides potential background characteristics of the author, such as nationality and education.

== Usage ==
Writeprint is a form of authorship attribution, used to identify traits of the author of a piece of digital media. These can include blog posts, emails, and forum messages.

== Components ==
There are five broad aspects to author identification in writeprint:

- Lexical features - the analysis of the lexicon, the author's choice of vocabulary, using characters and words to identify preferences of an individual.
  - This includes the use of uppercase and lowercase letters, frequency of certain letters, average length of word, and the mean length of the utterance itself.
- Syntactic features - the analysis of the author's writing style and sentence structure, such as punctuation and hyphenation, use of passive voice, and sentence complexity.
- Structural features - the analysis of the author's organization and structural arrangement of the work, including paragraph length, spacing, and indentation.
  - This encompasses the arrangement of sentences within paragraphs, use of farewells, greetings, and signatures in an email setting.
- Content-specific features - the analysis of the language that is contextually significant to subject of the written work, including the use of slang or acronyms. To be more specific, these features determine the interests of the subject by pinpointing keywords they use.
- Idiosyncratic features - the analysis of errors and other ungrammatical elements that may be unique to the author, such as incorrect spelling, misuse of words and inaccurate verb forms. Because this can be hard to control, it has achieved high accuracy in author identification when combined with other features.

While the five features above are the traditional methods of author identification, there are features unique to online text. Features such as choice in font, the use of emojis, and links to other websites all provide a path to identification which is absent in traditional text analysis.

== See also ==
- Author profiling
- Stylometry
- Forensic linguistics
