= Patrick Juola =

American computer scientist

- Born: 1966 (age 58–59); Renton, Washington
- Education: Johns Hopkins University (BS) Electrical Engineering and Mathematics (1987); University of Colorado Boulder (MS) Computer Science (1991); University of Colorado Boulder (MS) Cognitive Science (1993); University of Colorado Boulder (PhD) Computer Science (1995)
- Occupations: Professor; Director of Research
- Years active: 1998-present
- Known for: Stylometry

Patrick Juola is an American computer scientist known for his work on authorship attribution. He is the Joseph A. Lauritis, C.S.Sp Endowed Chair in Teaching and Technology at Duquesne University. He is known for his work on authorship attribution, including providing evidence that "Robert Galbraith" was a pen name of J. K. Rowling.

== Career ==
Juola studied electrical engineering and mathematics at Johns Hopkins University, then went on to study computer science and cognitive science at master's level at the University of Colorado Boulder. He completed a PhD at Colorado Boulder in computer science in 1995. He tutored at St Hugh's and Lincoln at the University of Oxford while conducting postdoctoral research in experimental psychology at Oxford. He returned to the United States to take up an assistant professorship in computer science at Duquesne University in 1998. He was promoted to associate professor in 2004. He published Principles of Computer Organization and Assembly Language, a textbook on computer organization and assembly language, in 2007 with Prentice-Hall. He then published Authorship Attribution, a survey and technical monograph on authorship attribution, the process of inferring the author or author's characteristics from the text of a document, with NOW Publishers in 2008.

Juola was promoted to full professor in 2014, and was then appointed to the Joseph A. Lauritis, C.S.Sp. Chair in Teaching and Technology in 2020. He has led the National Science Foundation-funded Evaluating Variations in Language Lab since 2010. As part of the group, Juola created a Java-based open source authorship attribution suite, JGAAP, Java Graphical Authorship Attribution Program, with several students at Duquesne University including David Berdik, Sean Vinsick, Amanda Kroft, and Michael Ryan.

== Research ==
Juola is best known for his work on authorship attribution. Though this had been a topic of his research for many years, he became well-known in 2013 when he was commissioned by the Sunday Times to examine the text of The Cuckoo's Calling, providing evidence that "Robert Galbraith" was a pen name of J. K. Rowling. Juola has also explored the identity of Satoshi Nakamoto, the founder of Bitcoin. Against the view that Satoshi Nakamoto was Dorian Nakamoto, as suggested in Newsweek, Juola's analysis suggested that Neal J. King was a more likely candidate.

Juola's other work on authorship attribution includes helping to identify pseudonymous works from a young Abraham Lincoln. His company has been hired by the Defense Advanced Research Project Agency, as his work might have cybersecurity applications, and Juola has served as an expert witness in court cases relating to fraud and inheritance.
