= Prague (novel) =

2002 historical novel by Arthur Phillips

- First edition
- Author: Arthur Phillips
- Cover artist: Barbara M. Bachman
- Language: English
- Genre: Historical novel
- Publisher: Random House
- Publication date: 2002
- Publication place: United States
- Media type: Print (Hardback & Paperback)
- ISBN: 0-375-50787-6 (first edition, hardback)

Prague is a historical novel by Arthur Phillips about a group of North American expatriates in Budapest, Hungary. It is set in about 1990, at the end of the Cold War. Prague is the author's debut novel, first published by Random House in 2002.

In 2003, the novel won The Los Angeles Times/Art Seidenbaum Award for First Fiction.

== Plot summary ==
Prague opens on the afternoon of May 25, 1990 with five North American expatriates living in the city of Budapest. The expatriates are, for the most part, optimistic about their prospects in the Central European city. John Price seeks a reconciliation with his older brother, Scott, who has come to Budapest to separate himself from his earlier life in the United States. Emily Oliver, an idealistic worker at the American Embassy, hopes to begin a distinguished diplomatic career. Mark Payton, a Canadian researching a history of nostalgia, relishes the chance to be immersed in a place with interesting history. Only Charles Gábor, a Hungarian-American venture capitalist who resents his co-workers and has contempt for his fellow Magyars, displays any pessimism at the story's outset. The five young expatriates enjoy the nightlife and new opportunities in the historic city.

John is instantly attracted to Emily, and plots to win her love, but she ignores him. He finds a job as a columnist for an English-language newspaper, BudapesToday. Still a virgin at the age of 24, he is initiated by his co-worker Karen, but finds the experience to be quite anticlimactic. He later commits "fradultery" with his brother's future wife, Mária.

Part II presents the complex history of the Horváth Kiadó (Horvath Press), a family-run publishing company – which also serves as a history of Budapest from the early nineteenth century to the present day. Presently, the head of the publishing house is Imre Horváth, who until recently had been exiled in Vienna. In the mid-nineteenth century, during the Revolution, the Horváth business is affected by the April Laws, a collection of laws legislated by Lajos Kossuth with the aim of modernizing Kingdom of Hungary into a nation state. During the Communist regime, the Horváth Kiadó was a state-owned enterprise; after the fall of communism, it is due to be privatized. Imre seeks an investment from Charles' venture capital firm in order to buy the press's assets and restart it in Budapest.

John frequently fraternizes with an elderly jazz bar pianist named Nádja. He is entranced by the romantic stories she tells of her past, but his friends are less than convinced of their veracity. In particular, John is dismayed by Emily's dismissal of Nádja as an "amazing liar". He is also dismayed that Emily pulls away when he tries to kiss her. John becomes involved with Nicky, a photographer and artist who wants a physical, but not an emotional, relationship.

Charles' firm rejects his proposal to fund the Horváth Kiadó. With the help of John, who writes supportive newspaper columns and serves as Charles' aide, Charles secures independent funding for this venture. He resigns from his firm and becomes a partner in the new Horváth Kiadó.

Mark Payton's research into nostalgia becomes a personal obsession. He takes an inordinate interest in gramophone music and riding in a funicular carriage. He later becomes preoccupied with the contemporary Gulf War and its continuous coverage on CNN. In September 1990, Mark leaves Budapest suddenly, due to his declining mental health.

In autumn 1990, Scott marries Mária and moves to Romania with her, telling John that he never wants to see him again. John continues to desire Emily and be jealous of other men she talks to. Charles and John learn that other parties may want to bid for the Horváth Kiadó assets.

In January 1991, Imre Horváth suffers a stroke and goes into a coma. Charles Gábor effectively becomes sole head of the publishing company. He accepts a takeover bid by a multinational media corporation, headed by the Australian billionaire Hubert Melchior (a parody of Rupert Murdoch and News Corporation). Horváth recovers, but not in time to prevent his historic publishing firm from being absorbed into the multinational publishing empire.

In March, John says that he loves Emily, even though he knows she is a "spy." The next day, John is fired from his job for having accused an embassy employee of being a spy. Emily, who was having a lesbian relationship with Nicky, leaves the city to escape the accusation. Charles returns to America, unrepentant. Frustrated by lack of catharsis and Charles' insincerity, John imagines a more fitting end to the story: Charles is shot dead in the airport by Krisztina Toldy, Imre Horváth's loyal assistant.

Finally, John himself leaves Budapest, traveling by train to the more promising city of Prague.

== Characters in "Prague" ==
- John Price is the protagonist of the novel, a 24-year-old who comes to Budapest to find his brother, with whom he has had a strained relationship. A dreamer throughout the story, he constantly suspects that life is better, more authentic, somewhere else. Both John and Scott Price are Jewish and from the US West Coast.
- Scott Price maintains a grudge against his younger brother John. A jock alpha male with a decidedly un-alpha childhood (he was overweight and often picked upon), he experiences regular lapses of insecurity, blaming John for his unpleasant childhood. For a living, he teaches English. Ultimately, he leaves for Romania with his wife, Mária, to escape John.
- Emily Oliver is an embassy worker, originally from Nebraska. The details of her work are not known to the other characters (she works in a classified information environment). She often feels unfulfilled by her work and suspects that she is living in the shadow of her father, with a distinguished foreign service career.
- Mark Payton is a gay Canadian academic who researches nostalgia. As his time in Budapest progresses, he becomes unable to separate his life from his work (which the other characters view as charmingly irrelevant) and eventually leaves for mental health reasons.
- Charles (Károly) Gábor is a junior member of a risk-averse venture capital firm. Of Hungarian ancestry (his parents escaped during the 1956 Hungarian Revolution) he came to Budapest hoping to earn a fortune, but his lethargic firm refuses his proposals. Eventually, he grows bitter, suspecting that all of Hungary's entrepreneurial spirits have been drained by four decades of Communism. He independently gathers investment capital to restart the Horváth Press.
- Karen Whitley is John Price's officemate, described by Nicky M. as "the office airhead", and the woman to whom John Price loses his virginity.
- Nicky Mankiewiliczki-Pobudziej (aka Nicky M.) is John Price's artist girlfriend who, while affectionate toward him, is also inerrantly selfish. While allowing sexual relations to flow freely, she refuses to give him any emotional support. She also has an affair with Emily Oliver.
- Mária is Scott Price's fiancée and, later, wife, of Hungarian ancestry. Despite her evident affection for Scott, she sleeps with John at one point in the novel.
- Nádja is an elderly Hungarian piano player. A cosmopolite with dazzling stories, she becomes a close friend of John throughout the novel, and he even experiences a sexual attraction to her, wishing she were younger so that he could be featured in her romantic stories. Of the characters who meet her, only John actually believes her unlikely stories, but the question of their veracity is never settled.
- Imre Horváth is the head of a Hungarian publishing house that has been in his family for six generations. He escaped Hungary in 1956 and began a new publishing house in Vienna. After the fall of Communism, he wishes to return home and restart the press. Other characters see him as a silly, self-important old man.
- Krisztina Toldy is Mr. Horváth's devoted assistant.

== Major themes ==
Prague is set in Budapest, Hungary, following the Cold War. The city of Prague represents the unfulfilled emotional desires of the novel's main characters: it is the city where – as the novel's characters perceive – there is more life, capital flows more freely, and there are better parties.

The five central expatriates are reminiscent of the Lost Generation popularized in novels such as Ernest Hemingway's The Sun Also Rises. Each of Prague's main characters comes to the city with a different motive. For Mark Payton, Budapest is an opportunity for field research in his study of historical nostalgia; he views his native city of Toronto as bland and lacking history. Emily desires to emulate her father's acclaimed foreign service career by working in the United States embassy. Scott Price seeks to escape his miserable childhood in the United States, while John Price (whom Scott sees as a source of said misery) desires reconciliation. Finally, Charles Gábor's goal is to make a fortune as a venture capitalist in the emerging, new Budapest.

Hungarian history is prominently featured in Prague, emerging via the novel's major Hungarian characters, particularly Nádja. About one quarter of the novel deals exclusively with the history of the Horváth family's publishing house – through Habsburg rule, the 1848 Revolution, a pre-World War I "golden age" (characterized, despite its charms, by cultural squabblings and anti-Semitism), then decades of turmoil through the World Wars and Soviet occupation.

Much of the historical detail furnished by Phillips is actually outside the purview or interest of the major characters (excluding Mark) but is given for the reader's benefit, adding historical context to events of the novel.

== Release details ==
- 2002, USA, Random House (ISBN 0-375-50787-6), Pub date June 2002, hardback (first edition).
- 2003, USA, Random House (ISBN 0-375-75977-8), Pub date June 2003, paperback.
- 2006, UK, Gerald Duckworth (ISBN 0-7156-3524-7), Pub date 23 Feb 2006, paperback.
