= Shakespeare attribution studies =

Seeking extent of Shakespeare's writings

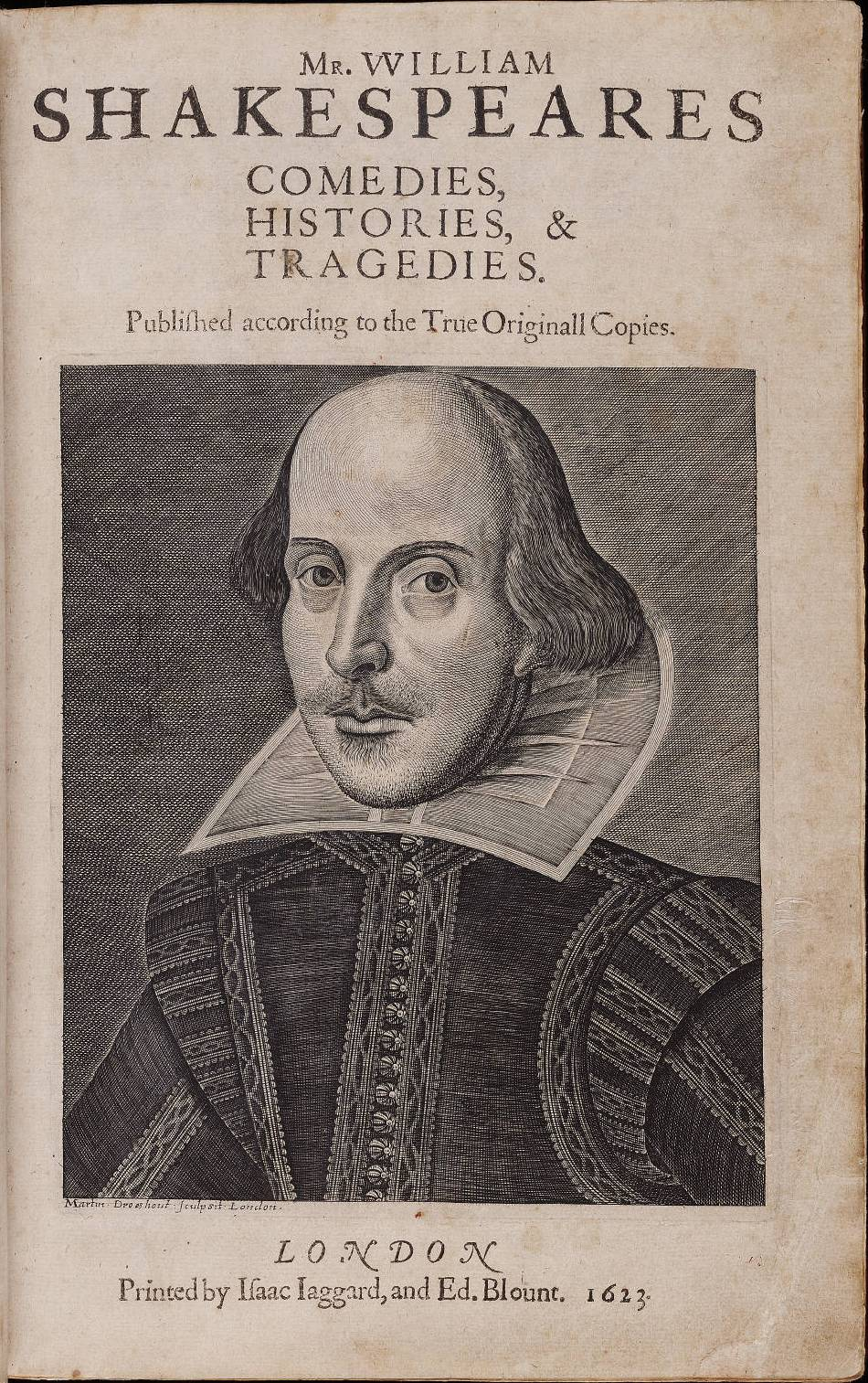
Title page of Mr. William Shakespeares Comedies, Histories, & Tragedies (1623), commonly referred to as the First Folio, which established the canonical status of the 36 plays included therein.

Shakespeare attribution studies is the scholarly attempt to determine the authorial boundaries of the William Shakespeare canon, the extent of his possible collaborative works, and the identity of his collaborators.

The studies, which began in the late 17th century, are based on the axiom that every writer has a unique, measurable style that can be discriminated from that of other writers using techniques of textual criticism originally developed for biblical and classical studies. The studies include the assessment of different types of evidence, generally classified as internal, external, and stylistic, of which all are further categorised as traditional and non-traditional.

== The Shakespeare canon ==
The Shakespeare canon is generally defined by the 36 plays published in the First Folio (1623), some of which are thought to be collaborations or to have been edited by others, and two co-authored plays, Pericles, Prince of Tyre (1609) and The Two Noble Kinsmen (1634); two classical narrative poems, Venus and Adonis (1593) and The Rape of Lucrece (1594); a collection of 154 sonnets and "A Lover's Complaint", both published 1609 in the same volume; two passages from the manuscript play Sir Thomas More, and a few other works. In recent years, the anonymous history play The Reign of King Edward III (1596) has been added to the canon, with Brian Vickers proposing that 40% of the play was written by Shakespeare, and the remainder by Thomas Kyd (1558–1594).

== The Booke of Sir Thomas More ==
Sir Thomas More is an Elizabethan play that depicts scenes from the life of Thomas More. It is believed that it was originally written by playwrights Anthony Munday and Henry Chettle, then perhaps several years later heavily revised by another team of playwrights, including Thomas Heywood, Thomas Dekker, and possibly Shakespeare, who is generally credited with two passages in the play. It survives only in a single manuscript, now owned by the British Library.

== A Funeral Elegy ==
This poetry was signed as "W.S." in February 1612 by a poet who has closely like Shakespearean text. Because it was privately issued and there are now surviving in just two copies, A Funeral Elegy received scant notice until 1989, when Donald W. Foster from Vassar College first presented archival, statistical, and literary evidence that WS could be William Shakespeare. Therefore, now there is a scholarly consensus that it was written by William Shakespeare, even though "the poem challenges prevailing notions of what it is that makes Shakespeare "Shakespeare."

== See also ==
- Chronology of Shakespeare's plays
- Early texts of Shakespeare's works
- Higher criticism
- Philology
- Shakespeare Apocrypha
- Shakespeare's editors
- Textual criticism
- Stylometry

== Read more ==
- Bate, Jonathan (1998), The Genius of Shakespeare, Oxford University Press, ISBN 978-0-19-512823-9
- Boyd, Brian; Jackson, Macdonald P., eds. (2004), Words That Count: Essays on Early Modern Authorship in Honor of MacDonald P. Jackson, University of Delaware Press, ISBN 978-0-87413-868-9
- Craig, Hugh; Kinney, Arthur F., eds. (2009), Shakespeare, Computers, and the Mystery of Authorship, Cambridge University Press, ISBN 978-0-521-51623-5
- Evans, G Blakemore (1974), Evans, G Blakemore (ed.), The Riverside Shakespeare, Houghton Mifflin, pp. 27–46, ISBN 978-0-395-04402-5
- Hope, Jonathan (1994), The Authorship of Shakespeare's Plays: A Socio-linguistic Study, Cambridge University Press, ISBN 978-0-521-41737-2
- Ioppolo, Grace (2006), Dramatists and their manuscripts in the age of Shakespeare, Jonson, Middleton and Heywood: Authorship, Authority and the Playhouse, Routledge, ISBN 978-0-415-33965-0
- Jackson, Macdonald P. (2003), Defining Shakespeare: Pericles as a Test Case, Oxford University Press, ISBN 978-0-19-926050-8
- Kathman, David (2003), "The Question of Authorship", in Wells, Stanley; Orlin, Lena C. (eds.), Shakespeare: An Oxford Guide, Oxford University Press, pp. 620–32, ISBN 978-0-19-924522-2
- Love, Harold (2002), Attributing Authorship: An Introduction, Cambridge University Press, ISBN 978-0-521-78948-6
- Malvern, Jack (2009), "Computer program proves Shakespeare didn't work alone, researchers claim", The Times
- Schoenbaum, S. (1966), Internal evidence and Elizabethan dramatic authorship, Northwestern University Press, ISBN 9780598177605, OCLC 189895
- Vickers, Brian (2004), Shakespeare, Co-Author: A Historical Study of Five Collaborative Plays, Oxford University Press, ISBN 978-0-19-926916-7
- Wells, Stanley W. (2007), Shakespeare & Co., Random House, ISBN 978-0-7139-9773-6
