= List of White Pass and Yukon Route locomotives and cars =

The White Pass and Yukon Route railroad has had a large variety of locomotives and railroad cars.

== White Pass steam locomotives ==
Locomotives with dark grey have been scrapped, while locomotives with light grey have been either put on display, or sold to other railroads.

Number or Name	Builder	Whyte Type AAR Type (geared steam loco-motives) ─────── Tractive effort (1942)	Date built	Shop No.	Remarks
Duchess	Baldwin Locomotive Works	2-4-0ST 2,900 lbf (13 kN)	September 1878	4424	No train brake. Originally, Dunsmuir, Diggle & Co. 2 ft 6 in (762 mm) gauge 0-6-0ST #2, Duchess. (Named for Catherine S. D. Wellesley [1773–1831], wife of the 1st Duke of Wellington.) Dunsmuir, Diggle sold to Wellington Colliery Railroad in 1883. Duchess converted to a 2-4-0T by disconnecting the front drivers, and gauge widened to 3 ft (914 mm), most likely about 1889. Resold to John Irving Navigation Co. via Albion Iron Works (dealer) in April 1900, for use on the Taku Tram. Irving Navigation purchased by the WP&YR in June 1900. Duchess powered the Taku Tram from 1900 to 1920. Used as a trash burner at Carcross, Yukon from 1920 to 1931. In 1931 the locomotive was put on display at the WP&YR depot in Carcros, Yukon, and remains there today.
2nd 4	Baldwin Locomotive Works	2-6-2 11,031 lbf (49.07 kN)	September 1912	37564	Originally, Klondike Mines Railway #4. The Klondike Mines Railway was abandoned in 1913 and the assets were sold to the Yukon Consolidated Gold Corp. in 1925. Locomotive purchased by the WP&YR in 1942. Retired in 1950. Sold to the Oak Creek Central Railway in 1955 (OCC #4). Resold to the Peppermint & North Western Railroad. in 1960 (P&NW #4). Resold to the Petticoat Junction Railroad in 1964 (PJ #4). Resold to the Gold Nugget Junction Railroad in 1969 (GNJ #4). Resold to Wild's Game Farm in 1984. Resold to Dry Gulch, U.S.A. (now New Life Ranch Frontier Cove) in 2005. Resold, and moved to Georgetown Loop Railroad in 2015. Resold to South Park Rail Society and restored to service at Como, Colorado, in 2017.
8	Climax Locomotive Works	B-B-B [3-Truck Climax ] 20,000 lbf (89 kN)	December 1897	167	Originally, Colorado & Northwestern Railway #2. Acquired by the WP&YR in 1899, as #8. In 1900 the locomotive was renumbered 58 on paper, but the locomotive itself was never physically renumbered. Sold to W.D. Hofius & Co. (dealer) in 1902. Resold in 1903 to the White Bros.- or White Star Lumber Co., who reduced it to an 0-4-(4-0) [2-truck] type and converted it to standard gauge (WSL #1). Probably scrapped about 1916. The known evidence suggests that this locomotive was not sold to the Maytown Lumber Co.
USA 10	Baldwin Locomotive Works	4-6-0 16,010 lbf (71.2 kN)	January 1916	42768	Originally, East Tennessee & Western North Carolina Railroad #10. Purchased by the U.S. Army in 1942. Bore "W.P.&Y.R." on tender. Severely damaged in the 1943 Whitehorse engine house fire and retired. Shipped to Auburn, Washington in 1944. Scrapped in 1946.
USA 14	Baldwin Locomotive Works	4-6-0 16,010 lbf (71.2 kN)	September 1919	52406	Originally, East Tennessee and Western North Carolina Railroad #14. Purchased by the U.S. Army in 1942. Bore "W.P.&Y.R." on tender. Severely damaged in the 1943 Whitehorse engine house fire and retired. Shipped to Auburn, Washington in 1944. Scrapped in 1946.
USA 20 (ex-USA 3920)	Baldwin Locomotive Works	2-8-0 13,200 lbf (59 kN)	December 1890	11355	Originally, Denver, Leadville & Gunnison Railway #272. Became Colorado and Southern Railway #69 in 1899. Purchased by the U.S. Army in April 1943 as #3920 for use on the WP&YR. Renumbered to 20 in June 1943. Retired and shipped to Auburn, Washington in 1944. Scrapped in 1946.
USA 21 (ex-USA 3921)	Baldwin Locomotive Works	2-8-0 13,200 lbf (59 kN)	December 1890	11356	Originally, Denver, Leadville & Gunnison Ry. #273. Became Colorado & Southern Ry. #70 in 1899. Purchased by the U.S. Army in April 1943 as #3921 for use on the WP&YR. Renumbered to 21 in June 1943. Retired and shipped to Auburn, Washington in 1944. Scrapped in 1946. Exchanged tenders in 1930 with Chicago, Burlington & Quincy Railroad Loco #537 (2-8-0, Baldwin #14792, 1896).
USA 22 (ex-USA 3922)	Baldwin Locomotive Works	2-8-0 12,600 lbf (56 kN)	May 1904	24109	Originally, Silverton Northern Railroad #3. The Silverton Northern Railroad was abandoned in 1942. Locomotive sold to Dulien Steel Products Co. (dealer) thereafter. Purchased by the U.S. Army in April 1943 as #3922 for use on the WP&YR. Renumbered to 22 in June 1943. Retired and shipped to Auburn, Washington in 1944. Scrapped in 1946.
USA 23 (ex-USA 3923)	Baldwin Locomotive Works	2-8-0 12,600 lbf (56 kN)	April 1906	27977	Originally, Silverton Northern Railroad #4. The Silverton Northern Railroad was abandoned in 1942. Locomotive sold to Dulien Steel Products Co. (dealer) thereafter. Purchased by the U.S. Army in April 1943 as #3923 for use on the WP&YR. Renumbered to 23 in June 1943. Retired and shipped to Auburn, Washington in 1944. Scrapped in 1946.
24 (ex-USA 24, exx-USA 3924)	Baldwin Locomotive Works	2-8-0 15,510 lbf (69.0 kN)	May 1904	24130	Originally, Silverton, Gladstone and Northerly Railroad #34, Gold Prince. Sold to the Silverton Northern Railroad in 1915 (SN #34). The Silverton Northern Railroad was abandoned in 1942. Locomotive resold to Dulien Steel Products Co. (dealer) thereafter. Purchased by the U.S. Army in April 1943 as #3924 for use on the WP&YR. Renumbered to 24 in June 1943. Retired in 1945. Sold to the WP&YR in 1947. Scrapped in 1951. Original #24 tender was reassigned to Loco #66 in 1947. Tender body scrapped in 1951. Tender underframe scrapped in 1957.
Georgetown Loop RR 40	Baldwin Locomotive Works	2-8-0 21,437 lbf (95.36 kN)	September 1920	53777	Originally, International Railways of Central America #50. Renumbered to 40 in 1928. The locomotive was sold to Lindsey Ashby (who also had IRCA 44) for use on the Colorado Central Railroad in 1972(CC #40) and was transferred to the Georgetown Loop Railroad in 1977 (GL #40) The locomotive was on loan to the WP&YR in 2000 and 2001, and was returned to the G.L. R.R. in 2001. In 2004 the locomotive was transferred to the Colorado Railroad Museum, however in 2017 the Georgetown Loop's new operator agreed to bring 40 back to the loop to operate alongside IRCA 111, the locomotive 40 originally came to America with when Ashby purchased 40 and Don Drawer #111 (a 1926 Baldwin).
51 (ex-1st 1)	Brooks Locomotive Works	2-6-0 10,380 lbf (46.2 kN)	January 1881	494	Originally, Utah & Northern Ry. #23. Renumbered to 80 in 1885 to conform to Union Pacific Railway system-wide numbering. Sold to the Columbia & Puget Sound Railroad in 1889 (C&PS 2nd 3). Acquired by the WP&YR in 1898 as 1st 1. Baldwin steel boiler, new cylinders and larger smokebox installed; and renumbered to 51 in 1900. Powered the Taku Tram from 1920 to 1931. Retired in 1941. In 1958 the locomotive was put on display at the MacBride Museum in Whitehorse, Yukon and it remains there today.
52 (ex-1st 2)	Brooks Locomotive Works	2-6-0 10,380 lbf (46.2 kN)	August 1881	567	Originally, Utah and Northern Railway #37. Renumbered to 94 in 1885 to conform to Union Pacific Railway system-wide numbering. Sold to the Columbia & Puget Sound Railroad in 1889 (C&PS 2nd 4). Acquired by the WP&YR in 1898 as 1st 2. Baldwin steel boiler, new cylinders and larger smokebox installed; and renumbered to 52 in 1900. Powered the Taku Tram from 1932 to 1936. Retired in 1936 and stored at Atlin, British Columbia until 1964 when it was brought back to Skagway. In 1971 the locomotive was put on display at The United Transportation Union Hall in Skagway, Alaska. In the early 2000s it was taken to storage at the WP&YR shops. In 2014 the locomotive was cosmetically restored and put on display at the WP&YR depot in Skagway.
53 (ex-1st 3)	Grant Locomotive Works	2-8-0 12,876 lbf (57.28 kN)	December 1881 ~ February 1882, most likely February 1882	one of ##1443, 1446-1451, 1456-1458, 1456-1458, most likely #1451	Denver & Rio Grande Railroad Class C-16, proposed ##230-239 series locomotive. One of the last ten locomotives built by Grant for the D.&R.G. R.R. The D.&R.G. R.R. could not pay for these ten locomotives, because railroad bond prices had just collapsed. So, the locomotives were sold instead to the Toledo, Cincinnati & St. Louis Railroad in June 1882 (TC&StL ##57-66). This loco became TC&StL #63. Bondholders sued to foreclose on the T.C.&St.L. R.R. in 1883. After the bondholders’ foreclosure, #63 was sold to certain creditors in December 1883, subject to a Grant lien. These creditors transferred No. 63 to the Cincinnati, Lebanon & Northern Ry. in 1885 (CL&N #63). Grant sued to foreclose on #63 in 1887. After the Grant foreclosure, #63 was sold to the Columbia & Puget Sound Railroad via Barrows & Co. (dealer) in September 1887 (C&PS #9). Loco acquired by the WP&YR in 1898 as 1st 3. Larger smokebox installed and renumbered to 53 in 1899. Retired in 1907. Scrapped in 1918.
54 (ex-1st 4)	Baldwin Locomotive Works	4-4-0 5,470 lbf (24.3 kN)	March 1878	4294	Earliest-built locomotive to operate on the WP&YR. Originally, Thurston County R.R. Construction Co., d.b.a. "Olympia & Tenino R.R.," #1, E. N. Ouimette. Transferred to Olympia & Chehalis Valley Railroad in 1881 (O&CV #1). Sold to the Columbia & Puget Sound Railroad in 1890 (C&PS #10). Acquired by the WP&YR in 1898 as 1st 4. Renumbered to 54 in 1899. Sold to the Tanana Mines Railway. in 1905 (TM #50). The TM Railway became the Tanana Valley Railroad in 1907 (TV #50). The Tanana Valley Railroad was sold to the Alaskan Engineering Commission in 1917 (AEC #50). The A.E.C. became The Alaska Railroad in 1923 (ARR #50). Locomotive scrapped in 1930.
55 (ex-5)	Baldwin Locomotive Works	2-8-0 12,150 lbf (54.0 kN)	May 1885	7597	Originally, Columbia & Puget Sound Railroad #8. Acquired by the WP&YR in 1898 as #5. Renumbered to 55 in 1899. Sold to the Klondike Mines Railway in 1904 (KM #2). The KM Ry. was abandoned in 1913. km Ry. assets sold to the Yukon Consolidated Gold Corp. in 1925. In 1961 the locomotive was put on display at the Dawson City Museum in Dawson City, Yukon where it remains today.
56 (ex-6)	Baldwin Locomotive Works	2-8-0 16,800 lbf (75 kN)	January 1899	16455	Purchased new. Originally #6. Renumbered to 56 in 1899. Rebuilt from Vauclain compound to simple in 1907. Retired in 1938. Scrapped in 1940. Original #56 tender tank rebuilt to backward-sloping in 1936. Rebuilt again, with a substitute underframe, before retirement of Loco #56 in 1938. Immediately after Loco #56’s 1938 retirement, rebuilt #56 tender temporarily loaned to Loco #61. Rebuilt #56 tender underframe made into a weed burner in 1941. Made into substitute underframe for Rotary #1 in 1942. Made into Flatcar R2 in 1944. Wrecked in 1951. Made into Flatcar #1016 in 1956. Rebuilt #56 tender body placed as riprap along the Skagway River, at Mile Post 2.5, from 1949 to 1990. Retrieved in 1990. Body moved adjacent Skagway Museum about 2000. In deteriorated condition. Number no longer visible.
57 (ex-7)	Baldwin Locomotive Works	2-8-0 15,118 lbf (67.25 kN)	January 1899	16456	Vauclain compound locomotive. Purchased new. Originally #7. Renumbered to 57 in 1899. Sold in 1906 to the Klondike Mines Railway (KM #3). The Klondike Mines Railway was abandoned in 1913. Klondike Mines Railway assets sold to the Yukon Consolidated Gold Corp. in 1925. In 1961 the locomotive was put on display at the Dawson City Museum in Dawson City, Yukon and is still there today. Original #57 tender returned to WP&YR in 1942, and assigned to Rotary #2 from 1942 to 1944. Tender placed as riprap along the Skagway River, at Mile Post 2.5, in 1949.
59	Baldwin Locomotive Works	4-6-0 15,400 lbf (69 kN)	May 1900	17749	Purchased new. Retired and scrapped in 1941. Original #59 tender underframe made into Flatcar 1st 100 in 1942. Scrapped in 1947.
60	Baldwin Locomotive Works	4-6-0 15,400 lbf (69 kN)	May 1900	17750	Purchased new. Retired in 1942. In 1949 the locomotive was buried in the Skagway River, at Mile Post 2.5, to stabilize the track bed. Retrieved and moved to storage at the WP&YR shops in Skagway in 1990. In deteriorated condition. Number no longer visible. Original #60 tender reassigned to Loco #191 or 194 from 1944 to 1946. Tender subsequently placed as riprap along the Skagway River, at Mile Post 2.5, from 1949 to 1989. Retrieved in 1989. Tender body moved adjacent Skagway Museum about 2000 – displayed upside down. In deteriorated condition. Number no longer visible.
61	Baldwin Locomotive Works	2-8-0 17,600 lbf (78 kN)	June 1900	17814	Purchased new. Retired in 1944. Placed as riprap along the Skagway River, at Mile Post 2.5, in 1949. Retrieved and moved to Skagway Shops in 1990. Sold to Mid-West Locomotive & Machine Works in Wisconsin in 2003. Traded to Stockton Locomotive Works in 2016. Temporarily borrowed the rebuilt, slope-back #56 tender in 1938. Original #61 tender reassigned to Loco #191 or 194 from 1944 to 1946. Tender subsequently placed as riprap along the Skagway River, at Mile Post 2.5, in 1949.
62	Baldwin Locomotive Works	4-6-0 14,600 lbf (65 kN)	June 1900	17895	Purchased new. Retired in 1945. Placed as riprap along the Skagway River, at Mile Post 2.3, in 1949. Original #62 tender placed as riprap along the Skagway River, at Mile Post 2.5, in 1949.
63	Brooks Locomotive Works	2-6-0 8,400 lbf (37 kN)	April 1881	522	Originally, Kansas Central Railroad #7, Sidney Dillon. Renumbered to 102 in 1885 to conform to Union Pacific Railway system-wide numbering. K.C. R.R. converted to standard gauge in 1890. Locomotive sold to F.M. Hicks & Co. (dealer) in 1897. Purchased from Hicks by the WP&YR in 1900. Sold to the Klondike Mines Railway in 1902 (KM #1). The KM Railway was abandoned in 1913. KM Ry. assets sold to the Yukon Consolidated Gold Corp. in 1925. Locomotive put on display at Dawson City, Yukon in 1961.
64	Hinkley Locomotive Works	2-6-0 7,802 lbf (34.71 kN)	November 1888	1781	Built as a 2-6-0. Originally, North Western Coal and Navigation Company #10. NWC&N was sold to the Alberta Railway & Coal Co. in 1891. Locomotive reduced to an 0-6-0, most likely in 1893 to accommodate dual gauge coupler fixtures. Restored to a 2-6-0 and sold to the Columbia and Western Railway in 1896 (C&W #2). The Columbia and Western was taken over by the Canadian Pacific Railway in 1898. The Canadian Pacific Railway designated the locomotive 2nd 506, but never physically renumbered it. Purchased by the WP&YR in 1900. Retired in 1907. Scrapped in 1918.
65	Brooks Locomotive Works	2-6-0 8,480 lbf (37.7 kN)	September 1881	578	Originally, Kansas Central Railroad #8, L. T. Smith. Renumbered to 103 in 1885 to conform to Union Pacific Railway system-wide numbering. K.C. R.R. converted to standard gauge in 1890. Locomotive sold to the Columbia and Western Railway in 1896 (C&W #3). The C&W was taken over by the Canadian Pacific Railway in 1898. The Canadian Pacific Railway designated the locomotive 2nd 507, but never physically renumbered it. Purchased by the WP&YR in 1900. Sold to the Tanana Mines Railway in 1906 (TM #51). The Tanana Mines Railway became the Tanana Valley Railroad in 1907 (TV #51). The Tanana Valley Railroad was sold to the Alaskan Engineering Commission in 1917 (AEC #51). The A.E.C. became The Alaska Railroad in 1923 (ARR #51). Locomotive scrapped in 1930.
66	Baldwin Locomotive Works	4-6-0 15,400 lbf (69 kN)	May 1901	18964	Purchased new. Retired in 1951. Placed as riprap along the Skagway River at Mile Post 4.7 in 1967. Original #66 tender wrecked near Fraser in 1947. Loco #66 received the original #24 tender later in 1947, until 1951. Original #66 tender left at Fraser until at least 1990.
67	Baldwin Locomotive Works	4-6-0 15,400 lbf (69 kN)	May 1901	18965	Purchased new. Retired in 1941. Placed as riprap along the Skagway River, at Mile Post 2.5, in 1949. Original #67 tender underframe made into Flatcar 101 in 1942. Scrapped in 1947.
68	Baldwin Locomotive Works	2-8-0 24,000 lbf (110 kN)	June 1907	30998	Purchased new. Severely damaged by rock slide in 1917 and retired. Scrapped in 1938.
69	Baldwin Locomotive Works	2-8-0 23,962 lbf (106.59 kN)	June 1908	32962	Purchased new. Nicknamed Gila Monster by the 770th Railway Operating Battalion during World War II. Retired in 1954. Sold to the Black Hills Central Railroad in 1956. (BHC #69, Klondike Casey). Resold to the Nebraska Midland Railroad in 1973 (NM #69). Last run by Nebraska Midland Railroad in 1990. Sold back to the WP&YR in 2001. Returned to service on the WP&YR in 2008. Locomotive has not operated since 2013 and is currently stored at the WPYR shops. Tender rebuilt in 1951 by substituting the original #81 tender body (Ex-SV #50). Original #69 tender body placed as riprap along the Skagway River, at Mile Post 2.5, in 1957.
70	Baldwin Locomotive Works	2-8-2 25,200 lbf (112 kN)	May 1938	62234	Purchased new. Retired in 1963. Sold to Silver Dollar City Tennessee in 1977 (SDCT #70). SDCT sold out to Dollywood in 1986 (Dollywood #70, Cinderella), restored in 1987. Received the original #195 tender in 1950. Original #70 tender reassigned to Rotary #1 from 1950 to 1953. Reassigned to retired Loco #196 from 1953 to 1962. Tender underframe used to make Flatcar #1201 in 1962. Tender body shipped out of Skagway in 1979.
71	Baldwin Locomotive Works	2-8-2 25,200 lbf (112 kN)	January 1939	62257	Purchased new. Retired in 1963. Sold to Silver Dollar City Tennessee in 1977 (SDCT #71). SDCT sold out to Dollywood in 1986 (Dollywood #71, Beatrice). Locomotive currently stored inoperable at the Dollywood backshop. Received the original #196 tender from 1950 to 1977. Received its original tender, off Loco #192, from 1977 to 1985 (by SDCT). Original #71 tender scrapped in 1985. Original #71 tender reassigned to Rotary #2 from 1951 to 1953. Reassigned to Loco #190 from 1953 to 1960. Sold to the Rebel R.R. in 1960, along with Loco #192. The Rebel R.R. sold out to Goldrush Junction in 1970. Goldrush sold out to SDCT in 1977, at which time the tender was returned to Loco #71.
72	Baldwin Locomotive Works	2-8-2 25,200 lbf (112 kN)	May 1947	73351	Purchased new. Retired in 1964. Used as a stationary boiler from 1964 to 1969. Severely damaged in the 1969 Skagway roundhouse fire. All but its chassis was scrapped in 1977. The chassis was sold to Silver Dollar City Tennessee in 1977. SDCT sold out to Dollywood in 1986. Chassis scrapped in 1999. Original #72 tender was also the original #197 tender. Severely damaged in the 1969 Skagway roundhouse fire. Tender body scrapped between 1972 & 1976. Tender underframe sold to Sumpter Valley R.R. in 1977. Underframe left S.V. R.R. between 1989 & 2015 – most likely, traded away.
73	Baldwin Locomotive Works	2-8-2 25,200 lbf (112 kN)	May 1947	73352	Purchased new. Retired in 1964. Put on display at Bennett, British Columbia, in 1968. Moved to Whitehorse, Yukon for restoration in 1979. Restored to service in 1982. Rebuilt 2017-2019. Operable. Original #73 tender was also the original #193 tender. Tender had received a dent in its rear, in a 1944 wreck. Tender rebuilt in 2001, by substituting the original #192 tender body, off Rotary #2. Original #193/73 tender body stored.
80	American Locomotive Company	2-8-2 19,000 lbf (85 kN)	July 1920	61980	Originally, Sumpter Valley Railway 2nd 101. Renumbered to 20 in 1920. Purchased by the WP&YR in 1940. Shipped to Skagway in 1941. Retired in 1958. Sold to Sumpter Valley Railroad in 1977 (SV #20). Original #80 tender, delivered in 1941, had been the tender from SV Ry. Loco #18 (2-8-2, Baldwin #42815, 1916). Loco #80 received the original #194 tender, off Rotary #1 or 2, from 1949 to 1962. In 1993, Loco #80 (by then SV RR #20) received the former tender of SV Ry. Loco #19. Original #80 tender (ex-SV #18) reassigned to Rotary #1 from 1949 to 1950. Reassigned to Loco #196 from 1950 to 1953. Reassigned to Loco #192 from 1953 to 1960. Sold to the Tweetsie R.R. along with Loco #190 in 1960.
1st 81	American Locomotive Company	2-8-2 19,000 lbf (85 kN)	July 1920	61981	Originally, Sumpter Valley Railway 2nd 102. Renumbered to 19 in 1920. Purchased by the WP&YR in 1940. Shipped to Skagway in 1941. Retired in 1957. Sold to Sumpter Valley Railroad in 1977 (SV #19). Restored to operation on Sumpter Valley Railroad in 1995. Original #81 tender, delivered in 1941, had been the tender from SV Ry. Loco #50 (4-6-0, Baldwin #42865, 1916). Original #81 tender replaced by the original #191 tender, off Rotary #1 or 2, from 1949 to 1990. In 1993, Loco 1st 81 (by then SV R.R. #19) received the former tender of SV Ry. Loco #20. Original #81 tender (ex-SV #50) reassigned to Rotary #2 from 1949 to 1951. Body of tender replaced the original #69 tender body in 1951.
Proposed USA 152	Baldwin Locomotive Works	4-6-0 10,000 lbf (44 kN)	June 1920	53296	Originally, Alaskan Engineering Commission #152. The A.E.C. became The Alaska Railroad in 1923. Locomotive acquired by the U.S. Army in 1942 for use on the WP&YR, shipped to Skagway, Alaska, but not off loaded. Instead, shipped to Lathrop (California) Army Depot. Sold to M. Davidson Co. (dealer) in 1946. Resold to the Antelope & Western R.R. in 1951 (A&W #2). Transferred to the Camino, Cable & Northern Railroad in 1963 (CC&N #2). Resold to the Keystone Locomotive Co. in 1974. Resold to the Huckleberry Railroad in 1975 (Huckleberry #2). Renumbered back to 152 in 2006.
190 (ex-USA 190)	Baldwin Locomotive Works	2-8-2 16,000 lbf (71 kN)	February 1943	69425	U.S. Army Class S118. Originally, USA #190, and used by the Army on the WP&YR. Transferred to the WP&YR in 1946. Out of service by 1959. Sold to the Tweetsie Railroad in 1960 (Tweetsie #190, Yukon Queen). Received the original #71 tender, off Rotary #2, from 1953 to 1960. Loco #190 sold to Tweetsie R.R. in 1960, along with the original #80 tender (ex-SV #18), off Loco #192. Original #190 tender reassigned to Rotary #1 from 1953 to 2019. Rebuilt into Auxiliary Tender #733 in 2019.
191 (ex-USA 191)	Baldwin Locomotive Works	2-8-2 16,000 lbf (71 kN)	February 1943	69426	U.S. Army Class S118. Originally, USA #191, and used by the Army on the WP&YR. Retired in 1946. Sold to the WP&YR in 1947. Scrapped in 1951. Received original #60 or 61 tender from 1944 to 1946. Original #191 tender reassigned to Rotary #1 or 2 from 1944 to 1949. Reassigned to Loco 1st 81 from 1949 to 1990. Tender sold to Sumpter Valley R.R. in 1977 and returned to WP&YR in 1990. Scrapped in 1998.
192 (ex-USA 192)	Baldwin Locomotive Works	2-8-2 16,000 lbf (71 kN)	February 1943	69427	U.S. Army Class S118. Originally, USA #192, and used by the Army on the WP&YR. Transferred to the WP&YR in 1946. Retired in 1957. Sold to the Rebel Railroad in 1960 (Rebel Railroad #192). The Rebel Railroad sold out to Goldrush Junction in 1970 (GRJ #192, Klondike Katie). Goldrush Junction sold out to Silver Dollar City Tennessee in 1977 (SDCT #192, Daddy Bryson). SDCT sold out to Dollywood in 1986 (Dollywood #192, Klondike Katie). Received the original #80 tender, off Rotary #1, from 1953 to 1960. Received the original #71 tender, off Loco #190, in 1960 when Loco #192 was sold to the Rebel R.R. Received the original #196 tender, off Loco #71, in 1977 (by SDCT). Original #192 tender reassigned to Rotary #2 from 1953 to 1977. Tender sold to Sumpter Valley R.R. in 1977, and returned to WP&YR in 1990. Body assigned to Loco #73 in 2001. Underframe stored behind the Shops (2025).
193 (ex-USA 193)	Baldwin Locomotive Works	2-8-2 16,000 lbf (71 kN)	February 1943	69428	U.S. Army Class S118. Originally, USA #193, and used by the Army on the WP&YR. Retired in 1951. Sold to the WP&YR in 1947. Scrapped in 1951. Original #193 tender received a dent in its rear, in a 1944 wreck. Tender reassigned to Loco #73 in 1947. Tender rebuilt in 2001, by substituting the original #192 tender body, off Rotary #2. Original #193/73 tender body stored.
194 (ex-USA 194)	Baldwin Locomotive Works	2-8-2 16,000 lbf (71 kN)	February 1943	69429	U.S. Army Class S118. Originally, USA #194, and used by the Army on the WP&YR. Retired in 1951. Sold to the WP&YR in 1947. Scrapped in 1951. Received the original #60 or 61 tender from 1944 to 1946. Original #194 tender reassigned to Rotary #1 or 2 from 1944 to 1949. Tender reassigned to Loco #80 from 1949 to 1962. Tender put on display with Loco #195 at the Skagway Museum in 1962.
195 (ex-USA 195)	Baldwin Locomotive Works	2-8-2 16,000 lbf (71 kN)	February 1943	69430	U.S. Army Class S118. Originally, USA #195, and used by the Army on the WP&YR. Retired in 1956. Sold to the WP&YR in 1947. Put on display adjacent to Skagway Museum in 1962. Received the original #194 tender, off Loco #80, when put on display in 1962. Original #195 tender reassigned to Loco #70 in 1950.
196 (ex-USA 196)	Baldwin Locomotive Works	2-8-2 16,000 lbf (71 kN)	February 1943	69431	U.S. Army Class S118. Originally, USA #196, and used by the Army on the WP&YR. Transferred to the WP&YR in 1946. Retired in 1950. Placed as riprap along the Skagway River at Mile Post 4.7 in 1968. Received the original #80 tender, off Rotary #1, from 1950 to 1953. While retired, received the original #70 tender, off Rotary #1, from 1950 to 1962. Original #196 tender reassigned to Loco #71 from 1950 to 1977. Reassigned to Loco #192 in 1977 (by Silver Dollar City Tennessee).
197 (ex-USA 197)	Baldwin Locomotive Works	2-8-2 16,000 lbf (71 kN)	February 1943	69432	U.S. Army Class S118. Originally, USA #197, and used by the Army on the WP&YR. Retired in 1945. Sold to the WP&YR in 1947. Scrapped in 1951. Original #197 tender reassigned to Loco #72 in 1947. Severely damaged in the 1969 Skagway roundhouse fire. Body scrapped between 1972 & 1976. Underframe sold to Sumpter Valley R.R. in 1977. Underframe left S.V. R.R. between 1989 & 2015 – most likely, traded away.
USA 198	Baldwin Locomotive Works	2-8-2 16,000 lbf (71 kN)	February 1943	69433	U.S. Army Class S118. Purchased new by the U.S. Army, and used by the Army on the WP&YR. Retired in 1944. Shipped to Auburn, Washington in 1945. Sold to Dulien Steel Products Co. (dealer) in 1946. Resold to the Hacienda Casa Grande of the Chicama Valley, Peru in 1948 (CG #18). The Hacienda’s property was nationalized and re-named Casa Grande Co-op No. 32 in 1969. The Casa Grande railroad was closed down in 1970, except for the pier area at Puerto Chicama, which only employed smaller locos. CG #18 (ex-USA 198) was scrapped between 1976 & 2003.
USA 199	Baldwin Locomotive Works	2-8-2 16,000 lbf (71 kN)	February 1943	69434	U.S. Army Class S118. Purchased new by the U.S. Army, and used by the Army on the WP&YR. Retired in 1944. Shipped to Auburn, Washington in 1945. Sold to Dulien Steel Products Co. (dealer) in 1946. Resold to the Hacienda Casa Grande of the Chicama Valley, Peru in 1948 (CG #17). The Hacienda’s property was nationalized and re-named Casa Grande Co-op No. 32 in 1969. This loco was subsequently re-numbered to 32. The Casa Grande railroad was closed down in 1970, except for the pier area at Puerto Chicama, which only employed smaller locos. CG #32 (ex-USA 199) was scrapped between 1976 & 2003.
USA 200	Baldwin Locomotive Works	2-8-2 16,000 lbf (71 kN)	February 1943	69435	U.S. Army Class S118. Purchased new by the U.S. Army, and used by the Army on the WP&YR. Retired in 1944. Shipped to Auburn, Washington in 1945. Sold to Dulien Steel Products Co. (dealer) in 1946. Resold to the Hacienda Casa Grande of the Chicama Valley, Peru in 1948 (CG #19). The Hacienda’s property was nationalized and re-named Casa Grande Co-op No. 32 in 1969. The Casa Grande railroad was closed down in 1970, except for the pier area at Puerto Chicama, which only employed smaller locos. CG #19 (ex-USA 200) was scrapped between 1970 & 1976.
USA 250	American Locomotive Co.	2-8-2 27,500 lbf (122 kN)	September 1923	64981	Denver & Rio Grande Western R.R. Class K-28. Originally, D&RGW #470. Purchased by the U.S. Army in 1942 for use on the WP&YR. Retired and shipped to Auburn, Washington in 1944. Scrapped in 1946.
USA 251	American Locomotive Co.	2-8-2 27,540 lbf (122.5 kN)	September 1923	64982	Denver & Rio Grande Western R.R. Class K-28. Originally, D&RGW #471. Purchased by the U.S. Army in 1942 for use on the WP&YR. Retired and shipped to Auburn, Washington in 1944. Scrapped in 1946.
USA 252	American Locomotive Co.	2-8-2 27,540 lbf (122.5 kN)	September 1923	64983	Denver & Rio Grande Western R.R. Class K-28. Originally, D&RGW #472. Purchased by the U.S. Army in 1942 for use on the WP&YR. Wrecked and shipped to Auburn, Washington in 1944. Scrapped in 1946.
USA 253	American Locomotive Co.	2-8-2 27,540 lbf (122.5 kN)	September 1923	64985	Denver & Rio Grande Western R.R. Class K-28. Originally, D&RGW #474. Purchased by the U.S. Army in 1942 for use on the WP&YR. On February 5, 1943, en route from Prince Rupert, British Columbia, to Skagway, Alaska, it sank on a barge during an ice storm at Haines, Alaska. Recovered 13 days later. Retired and shipped to Auburn, Washington in 1944. Scrapped in 1946.
USA 254	American Locomotive Co.	2-8-2 27,540 lbf (122.5 kN)	September 1923	64986	Denver & Rio Grande Western R.R. Class K-28. Originally, D&RGW #475. Purchased by the U.S. Army in 1942 for use on the WP&YR. Retired and shipped to Auburn, Washington in 1944. Scrapped in 1946.
USA 255	American Locomotive Co.	2-8-2 27,540 lbf (122.5 kN)	September 1923	64988	Denver & Rio Grande Western R.R. Class K-28. Originally, D&RGW#477. Purchased by the U.S. Army in 1942 for use on the WP&YR. Retired and shipped to Auburn, Washington in 1944. Scrapped in 1946.
USA 256	American Locomotive Co.	2-8-2 27,540 lbf (122.5 kN)	September 1923	64990	Denver & Rio Grande Western R.R. Class K-28. Originally, D&RGW #479. Purchased by the U.S. Army in 1942 for use on the WP&YR. Retired and shipped to Auburn, Washington in 1944. Scrapped in 1946.

== White Pass auxiliary tender ==
Number	Builder	Type	Date Built	Shop No.	Remarks
733	Baldwin Locomotive Works	Auxiliary Tender	Feb. 1943	69425	Water Capacity = 6800 gallons. U.S. Army Class S118 Tender. Originally, the original #190 tender. Tender transferred to WP&YR in 1946, along with USA 190. Tender reassigned to Rotary #1 from 1953 to 2019. Tender rebuilt into Auxiliary Tender #733 in 2019.

== White Pass gasoline-mechanical locomotives ==
Locomotives with dark grey have been scrapped, while locomotives with light grey have been either put on display, or sold to other railroads.

Number or Name	Builder	Horse- power	AAR Type	Date Built	Shop No.	Remarks
Ford Tram	Westminster Iron Works	90 hp (67 kW)	B	April 1937	68	Westminster Iron Works Heavy Duty Utility Rail Car. No train brake. Had a Ford Motor Co. V-8 engine. Purchased new. Powered the Taku Tram from 1937 to 1950. Operated at Carcross, Yukon, tie plant from 1952 to 1966. Retired in 1966. Scrapped in 2024.
2nd 3	Skagit Steel & Iron Works (Motor Appliance Corp.)	27 hp (20 kW)	B	1924	19	No cab. No train brake. Had a Fordson tractor engine. Originally, owned by J. G. Robinson Lettuce Farms Co. The Robinson Co. was sold at foreclosure to the Frye Co. in 1929. The Frye Co. formed a separate corporation, Frye Lettuce Farms, Inc., which operated the farm from 1929 until 1934, when Frye Lettuce went bankrupt. The Frye Co. retained this locomotive until 1938, when the locomotive was purchased by the WP&YR. Locomotive relegated to Shops use only. Retired in 1943. Scrapped in 1946.
3rd 3 (ex-USA 7651)	Plymouth Locomotive Works	175 hp (130 kW)	B	July 1942	4471	Plymouth Model ML6-25. LeRoi, Inc. RX15-C7 engine. Originally, U.S. Army #7651 and operated on the Kougarok R.R. (originally, the Wild Goose R.R.), out of Nome, Alaska. Derailed frequently, due to poor roadbed on the Kougarok R.R. Shipped to Skagway, Alaska in 1943. Transferred to the WP&YR in 1946 (WP&YR 3rd 3). Severely damaged in the 1969 Skagway roundhouse fire. Scrapped in 1970.

== White Pass diesel-electric locomotives ==
Locomotives with dark grey have been scrapped, while locomotives with light grey have been either put on display, or sold to other railroads.

Number	Builder	Horse- power	AAR Type	Date Built	Shop No.	Remarks
2nd 1	General Electric Co.	150 hp (110 kW)	B	June 1947	29191	GE Phase 3b 25-Tonner. No train brake. Cummins HBI-600 prime mover. Originally, Colorado Fuel & Iron Co. #6. Purchased by the WP&YR in 1969. Retired in 1979. Sold to Duffy & Son, Inc., in 1981. Donated to the British Columbia Forest Museum in 1985. Sold back to WP&YR and moved to Hamilton Manufacturing at Sedro-Woolley, Washington in 2013.
2nd 2	General Electric Co.	150 hp (110 kW)	B	June 1947	29195	GE Phase 3b 25-Tonner. No train brake. Cummins HBI-600 prime mover. Originally, Colorado Fuel & Iron #10. Purchased by the WP&YR in 1969. Retired in 1972. Sold to Duffy & Son, Inc., in 1981. Scrapped in 1985.
2nd 81	General Electric Co.	800 hp (600 kW)	C-C	June 1957	32933	Convertible gauge locomotive. Alco 6-251A prime mover. Originally, United States Army #3000. Operated on the Denver & Rio Grande Western Railroad from 1957 to 1960. Purchased by the WP&YR in 1973. Retired in 1978. Sold to Bandegua (Guatemala subsidiary of Del Monte Foods) in 1981 (Bandegua #314). Scrapped by 2006.
90	General Electric Co.	1,450 hp (1,080 kW)	C-C	June 1954	32060	Originally, GE pattern GEX3341 with Alco 6-251A prime mover. Purchased new. Converted to CERES 140 by Coast Engine & Equipment Co. with Cummins QSK45L prime mover in 2008-2009.
91	General Electric Co.	1,450 hp (1,080 kW)	C-C	June 1954	32061	Originally, GE pattern GEX3341 with Alco 6-251A prime mover. Purchased new. Converted to CLEAR 140 by Global Locomotive with Cummins QSK45L prime mover in 2009-2010.
92	General Electric Co.	1,450 hp (1,080 kW)	C-C	December 1956	32709	Originally, GE pattern GEX3341 with Alco 6-251B prime mover. Purchased new. Converted to CLEAR 140 by Sygnet Rail Technologies with Cummins QSK45L prime mover in 2011-2012. Retired in 2021. Offered for sale in 2022.
93	General Electric Co.	1,450 hp (1,080 kW)	C-C	December 1956	32710	Originally, GE pattern GEX3341 with Alco 6-251B prime mover. Purchased new. Colt Industries, Fairbanks-Morse 6-251 prime mover installed in 1998. Converted to CLEAR 140 by Sygnet Rail Technologies with Cummins QSK45L prime mover in 2011-2012. Retired in 2021. Offered for sale in 2022.
94	General Electric Co.	1,450 hp (1,080 kW)	C-C	December 1956	32711	Originally, GE pattern GEX3341 with Alco 6-251B prime mover. Purchased new. Converted to CLEAR 140 by Sygnet Rail Technologies with Cummins QSK45L prime mover in 2010-2011. Retired in 2021. Offered for sale in 2022.
95	General Electric Co.	1,450 hp (1,080 kW)	C-C	March 1963	34592	Originally, GE pattern GEX3341 with Alco 6-251B prime mover. Purchased new. Converted to CLEAR 140 by Sygnet Rail Technologies with Cummins QSK45L prime mover in 2012-2013. Retired in 2021. Offered for sale in 2022.
96	General Electric Co.	1,450 hp (1,080 kW)	C-C	March 1963	34593	Originally, GE pattern GEX3341 with Alco 6-251B prime mover. Purchased new. Converted to CLEAR 140 by Sygnet Rail Technologies with Cummins QSK45L prime mover in 2012-2013. Retired in 2021. Offered for sale in 2022.
97	General Electric Co.	1,450 hp (1,080 kW)	C-C	March 1963	34594	Originally, GE pattern GEX3341 with Alco 6-251B prime mover. Purchased new. Converted to CLEAR 140 by Sygnet Rail Technologies with Cummins QSK45L prime mover in 2010-2011. Retired in 2021. Offered for sale in 2022.
98	General Electric Co.	1,450 hp (1,080 kW)	C-C	May 1966	35790	Originally, GE pattern GEX3341 with Alco 6-251B prime mover. Purchased new. Converted to CERES 140 by Coast Engine & Equipment Co. with Cummins QSK45L prime mover in 2008-2009.
99	General Electric Co.	1,450 hp (1,080 kW)	C-C	May 1966	35791	Originally, GE pattern GEX3341 with Alco 6-251B prime mover. Purchased new. Converted to CLEAR 140 by Global Locomotive with Cummins QSK45L prime mover in 2009-2010. Retired in 2021. Offered for sale in 2022.
100	General Electric Co.	990 hp (740 kW)	C-C	May 1966	35792	Originally, GE pattern GEX3341 with Alco 6-251B prime mover. Purchased new. Shipped out for rebuild in 2013, however the rebuild was never completed and the locomotive was scrapped for parts in 2015. Prime mover rebuilt and installed in Loco #101 in 2015.
101	Montreal Locomotive Works	1,200 hp (890 kW)	C-C	May 1969	6023-01	MLW-Worthington Model Series C-14. Specification DL-535E, Originally had Alco 6-251D prime mover. Purchased new. Sold to Sociedad Colombiana de Transport Ferroviaro in 1992 (STF #1101). Repurchased by the WP&YR in 1999 (#101). Prime mover replaced by rebuilt prime mover from Loco #100 in 2015. Sold to the Durango & Silverton Narrow Gauge Railroad in April 2020 (D&S #101).
102	Montreal Locomotive Works	1,200 hp (890 kW)	C-C	May 1969	6023-02	MLW-Worthington Model Series C-14, Specification DL-535E. Alco 6-251D prime mover. Purchased new. Severely damaged in the 1969 Skagway roundhouse fire. Scrapped in 1993.
103	Montreal Locomotive Works	1,200 hp (890 kW)	C-C	May 1969	6023-03	MLW-Worthington Model Series C-14, Specification DL-535E. Alco 6-251D prime mover. Purchased new. Sold to Sociedad Colombiana de Transport Ferroviaro in 1992 (STF #1105). Repurchased by the WP&YR in 1999 (#103). Sold to the Durango & Silverton Narrow Gauge Railroad in May 2021 (D&S #103, Roxanne).
104	Montreal Locomotive Works	1,200 hp (890 kW)	C-C	May 1969	6023-04	MLW-Worthington Model Series C-14, Specification DL-535E. Alco 6-251D prime mover. Purchased new. Sold to Sociedad Colombiana de Transport Ferroviaro in 1992 (STF #1104). Repurchased by the WP&YR in 1999 (#104).
105	Montreal Locomotive Works	1,200 hp (890 kW)	C-C	May 1969	6023-05	MLW-Worthington Model Series C-14, Specification DL-535E. Alco 6-251D prime mover. Purchased new. Severely damaged in the 1969 Skagway roundhouse fire. Scrapped in 1993.
106	Montreal Locomotive Works	1,200 hp (890 kW)	C-C	May 1969	6023-06	MLW-Worthington Model Series C-14, Specification DL-535E. Alco 6-251D prime mover. Purchased new. Sold to Sociedad Colombiana de Transport Ferroviaro in 1992 (STF #1106). Repurchased by the WP&YR in 1999 (#106). Sold to the Durango & Silverton Narrow Gauge Railroad in May 2021 (D&S #106).
107	Montreal Locomotive Works	1,200 hp (890 kW)	C-C	May 1969	6023-07	MLW-Worthington Model Series C-14, Specification DL-535E. Alco 6-251D prime mover. Purchased new. Sold to Sociedad Colombiana de Transport Ferroviaro in 1992 (STF #1107). Repurchased by the WP&YR in 1999 (#107). Sold to the Durango & Silverton Narrow Gauge Railroad in April 2020 (D&S #107, Charlotte).
108	Montreal Locomotive Works	1,200 hp (890 kW)	C-C	December 1971	6054-01	MLW-Worthington Model Series C-14, Specification DL-535E. MLW 6-251D prime mover. Purchased new. Stored out of service.
109	Montreal Locomotive Works	1,200 hp (890 kW)	C-C	December 1971	6054-02	MLW-Worthington Model Series C-14, Specification DL-535E. MLW 6-251D prime mover. Purchased new.
110	Montreal Locomotive Works	1,200 hp (890 kW)	C-C	December 1971	6054-03	MLW-Worthington Model Series C-14, Specification DL-535E. MLW 6-251D prime mover. Purchased new.
Proposed 111	Bombardier (bought Montreal Locomotive Works in 1975)	1,200 hp (890 kW)	C-C	July 1982	6123-01	Bombardier Specification DL-535E. Bombardier 6-251D prime mover. Stored at Soulanges Industries, Les Cedres, Quebec, from 1982 until 1993. Sold to United States Gypsum Co in 1993 (USG #111). Operable.
Proposed 112	Bombardier	1,200 hp (890 kW)	C-C	July 1982	6123-02	Bombardier Specification DL-535E. Bombardier 6-251D prime mover. Stored at Soulanges Industries, Les Cedres, Quebec from 1982 until 1991. Sold to United States Gypsum Co in 1991 (USG #112). Operable.
Proposed 113	Bombardier	1,200 hp (890 kW)	C-C	July 1982	6123-03	Bombardier Specification DL-535E. Bombardier 6-251D prime mover. Stored at Soulanges Industries, Les Cedres, Quebec from 1982 until 1991. Sold to United States Gypsum Co in 1991 (USG #113). Destroyed in an accident in 1992.
114	Bombardier	1,200 hp (890 kW)	C-C	July 1982	6123-04	Bombardier Specification DL-535E. Bombardier 6-251D prime mover. Originally had defective dynamic brake. Stored at Soulanges Industries, Les Cedres, Quebec from 1982 until 1991. Purchased by the WP&YR in 1995. Wrecked in a 2006 derailment, defective dynamic brake partly contributing to the accident. Repaired, and dynamic brake defect corrected, in 2007. Retired in 2021. Sold to Cumbres & Toltec Scenic R.R. in November 2023.
3001	National Railway Equipment Company	3,000 hp (2,200 kW)	C-C	March 2020	278-3001-03-2020	NRE Model E3000CC-DC. Electro-Motive Diesel 16-645E3C prime mover. Completed to Qube Holdings, Australia, specifications in 2012 as #1110, but not delivered. Retained by NRE as Demonstrator #1110. Fully completed and sold to WP&YR in 2020.
3002	National Railway Equipment Company	3,000 hp (2,200 kW)	C-C	March 2020	278-3002-03-2020	NRE Model E3000CC-DC. Electro-Motive Diesel 16-645E3C prime mover. Completed to Qube Holdings, Australia, specifications in 2012 as #1109, but not delivered. Retained by NRE as Demonstrator #1109. Fully completed and sold to WP&YR in 2020. Wrecked September 7, 2024, returned to service June 2025.
3003	National Railway Equipment Company	3,000 hp (2,200 kW)	C-C	June 2020	278-3003-06-2020	NRE Model E3000CC-DC. Electro-Motive Diesel 16-645E3C prime mover. Completed to Qube Holdings, Australia, specifications in 2012 as #1111, but not delivered. Retained by NRE as Demonstrator #1111. Fully completed and sold to WP&YR in 2020.
3004	National Railway Equipment Company	3,000 hp (2,200 kW)	C-C	June 2020	278-3004-06-2020	NRE Model E3000CC-DC. Electro-Motive Diesel 16-645E3C prime mover. Completed to Qube Holdings, Australia, specifications in 2012 as #1112, but not delivered. Retained by NRE as Demonstrator #1112. Fully completed and sold to WP&YR in 2020.
3005	National Railway Equipment Company	3,000 hp (2,200 kW)	C-C	September 2020	274-3005-09-2020	NRE Model E3000CC-DC. Electro-Motive Diesel 16-645E3C prime mover. Purchased in 2020.
3006	National Railway Equipment Company	3,000 hp (2,200 kW)	C-C	September 2020	274-3006-09-2020	NRE Model E3000CC-DC. Electro-Motive Diesel 16-645E3C prime mover. Purchased in 2020.
Proposed 3007	National Railway Equipment Company	3,000 hp (2,200 kW)	C-C			NRE Model E3000CC-DC. Electro-Motive Diesel 16-645E3C prime mover. Expected delivery late 2026.

== White Pass passenger cars ==
Cars with dark grey have been scrapped, while cars with light grey have been either put on display, or sold to other railroads.

Number	Name	Builder	Date Built	Remarks
1	........	WP&YR	1900	Open sided car, single 4-wheel truck, no air brake, used on the Taku Tram. Originally used as a passenger car. Used as a baggage car from 1917 to 1936. Cut down to a flatcar in 1937. Retired in 1951. Currently at Taku Landing, British Columbia, in deteriorated condition. Number no longer visible.
2	........	Chassis: Ford Motor Co.; powered front truck and idler wheels at rear: WP&YR	1935	Self-propelled, 85 hp (63 kW) gasoline-mechanical, Ford Motor Co. V-8 engine. Made from 1934 Ford chassis and a bus body. No train brake. Demolished due to a derailment in 1942. Scrapped in 1943.
X3	........	American Car & Foundry Co., Lot #8339. (St. Charles)	1918	Originally, Sumpter Valley Railway Baggage Car #5. Purchased by the U.S. Army in 1943 for use on the WP&YR (USA #932). Transferred to the WP&YR (#932), and converted to a tool car, in 1946. Renumbered to X3 in 1947. Retired in 1969. Scrapped in 1971.
5	The Red Line	Beartown Mechanical Design, shop No. 1003	1998	Self-propelled, 436 hp (325 kW) Diesel-hydraulic, Caterpillar Inc. Model 3406 engine. Built up from Flatcar #496. Sold to Miles Canyon Historic Ry. Society in 2004. Society merged into the MacBride Museum in 2017. Car severely damaged by fire (arson) at Whitehorse in 2021.
1st 200	1st Lake Fraser (1946-1968)	WP&YR	1902	Business car from 1902 to 1939. Passenger car from 1939 to 1954. Bunk & Dining Car #X16 from 1954 to 1968, but not physically renumbered. Scrapped in 1969.
1st 201	........	........	........	See, 1st 205.
2nd 201	........	WP&YR	1900	Baggage Car. Destroyed in a runaway in 1938.
1st 202	........	J. Hammond Car Co.	1887	Combine. Originally, Olympia & Chehalis Valley R.R. Combine #3. Sold to Columbia & Puget Sound Railroad in 1890 (C&PS #5 or 6). Acquired by the WP&YR in 1898. Sold to Klondike Mines Railway in 1904 (KM #200). The KM Ry. was abandoned in 1913. KM Ry. assets sold to the Yukon Consolidated Gold Corp. in 1925. Car destroyed by fire between 1947 & 1949.
1st 203	........	........	........	See, #272.
1st 204	........	Billmeyer & Small Co.	1882	Originally, Addison & Northern Pennsylvania Railway. Sold to Barrows & Co. (dealer) in 1887. (Mr. Barrows was a director of the Addison & Pennsylvania Railway, which purchased the A&NP under foreclosure, in the same year.) Car moved to the Billmeyer factory at York, Pennsylvania, for renovation. Resold to the Columbia & Puget Sound Railway in 1888 (C&PS #3 or 4). Acquired by the WP&YR in 1898. Sold to the Tanana Mines Railway in 1905 (TM #204). The TM Railway became the Tanana Valley Railroad in 1907 (TV #204). Car wrecked in 1916.
1st 205	........	Seattle & Walla Walla Railroad	1877	Baggage Car. Originally, S&WW #2. Transferred to Columbia & Puget Sound R.R. in 1880. Acquired by the WP&YR in 1898 (1st 201). Renumbered to 1st 205 in 1900. Cupola added in 1924. Destroyed in a wreck in 1943.
1st 206	........	J. Hammond Car Co.	1887	Originally, Olympia & Chehalis Valley R.R. Sold to Columbia & Puget Sound Railroad in 1890 (C&PS #5 or 6). Acquired by the WP&YR in 1898. Sold to the Alaskan Engineering Commission in 1918. The A.E.C. became The Alaska Railroad in 1923. The Alaska Railroad's narrow-gauge branch was abandoned in 1930. Car presumed to have been scrapped thereafter.
1st 208	........	Billmeyer & Small Co.	1882	Originally, Addison & Northern Pennsylvania Railway. Sold to Barrows & Co. (dealer) in 1887. (Mr. Barrows was a director of the Addison & Pennsylvania Railway, which purchased the A&NP under foreclosure, in the same year.) Car moved to the Billmeyer factory at York, Pennsylvania, for renovation. Resold to the Columbia & Puget Sound Railroad in 1888 (C&PS #3 or 4). Acquired by the WP&YR in 1898. Sold to the Klondike Mines Railway in 1904 (KM #202). The KM Railway. was abandoned in 1913. KM Railway assets sold to the Yukon Consolidated Gold Corp. in 1925. Car destroyed by fire between 1947 & 1949.
210	........	Seattle & Walla Walla Railroad	1876	Earliest-built rolling stock to operate on the WP&YR. Originally, S&WW Coach #1. Transferred to Columbia & Puget Sound Railroad in 1880 (C&PS #1). Acquired by the WP&YR in 1898. Sold to the Tanana Mines Railway in 1905 (TM #100). The TM Railway became the Tanana Valley Railroad in 1907 (TV #200). The TV RR was sold to the Alaskan Engineering Commission in 1917 (AEC #200). The A.E.C. became The Alaska Railroad in 1923 (ARR #200). The Alaska Railroad's narrow-gauge branch was abandoned in 1930. Car presumed to have been scrapped thereafter.
212	........	Carter Brothers	1884	Originally, Columbia & Puget Sound R.R. #2. Acquired by the WP&YR in 1898. Destroyed by the 1932 Skagway roundhouse fire.
2nd 200	2nd Lake Summit	Underframe: National Steel Car Corp.; body: WP&YR	1992	Built up from one of Flatcar ##476 to 478. Equipped with wheelchair lift. The 1st Lake Summit had been Coach #262, from 1950 to 1969.
3rd 201	Lake Crater	Underframe: National Steel Car Corp.; body: WP&YR	1992	Built up from one of Flatcar ##476 to 478. Equipped with wheelchair lift.
2nd 202	Lake Bare Loon	Underframe: National Steel Car Corp.; body: WP&YR	1992	Built up from one of Flatcar ##476 to 478. Equipped with wheelchair lift.
2nd 203	Lake Fantail	Underframe: National Steel Car Corp.; body: WP&YR	1992	Built up from Flatcar #495. Equipped with wheelchair lift.
3rd 203	........	........	........	See, 2nd 206.
2nd 204	Lake Chilkoot	Underframe: National Steel Car Corp.; body: WP&YR	1993	Built up from Flatcar #497.
2nd 205	........	........	........	See, #705.
2nd 206	Lake Nares	Underframe: National Steel Car Corp.; body: WP&YR	1993	Built up from Flatcar #499. When this car was completed in 1993, it was mistakenly numbered “203.” Shops personnel had forgotten that the 2nd 203 had been completed the year before. When the mistake was discovered in 1994, there already was a 2nd 204 and 2nd 205. Therefore, the car was then renumbered to 2nd 206.
1st 207	........	........	........	See, #270.
2nd 207	Lake Morrow	Underframe: National Steel Car Corp.; body: WP&YR	1993	Built up from Flatcar #493. Equipped with wheelchair lift.
2nd 208	Lake Homan	Underframe: National Steel Car Corp.; body: WP&YR	1993	Built up from Flatcar #494.
1st 209	........	........	........	See, #267.
2nd 209	Lake Bernard	Underframe: National Steel Car Corp.; body: WP&YR	1993	Built up from Flatcar #491.
211	Combo (since 2017)	American Car & Foundry Co., Lot #8338. (St. Charles)	1918	Combine. Originally, Sumpter Valley Ry. #11. Tool car from 1937 to 1943. Purchased by the U.S. Army for use on the WP&YR (USA #934), and returned to passenger service, in 1943. Transferred to the WP&YR (#211), and cupola added, in 1946. Roof damaged by the 1969 Skagway roundhouse fire and replaced shortly thereafter, resulting in a slightly altered roof shape.
214	1st Lake Spirit (1988-2025)	J.G. Brill & Co.	1880	Originally, Toledo, Delphos & Burlington R.R. The T.D.&B. R.R. merged into the Toledo, Cincinnati & St. Louis R.R. in 1882. Bondholders sued to foreclose on the T.C.&St.L. R.R. in 1883. Car surrendered to equipment trustee, Boston Car Trust, in 1885. Car sold to Coeur d'Alene Ry. & Navigation Co. in 1886 (CdAR&N #1 or 2). Purchased by the WP&YR in 1900. Cupola added in 1971. Cupola removed in 1994. Retired in 2025.
216	Lake Black (since 1996)	J.G. Brill & Co.	1880	Originally, Toledo, Delphos & Burlington R.R. The T.D.&B. R.R. merged into the Toledo, Cincinnati & St. Louis R.R. in 1882. Bondholders sued to foreclose on the T.C.&St.L. R.R. in 1883. Car surrendered to equipment trustee, Boston Car Trust, in 1885. Car sold to Coeur d'Alene Railway & Navigation Co. in 1886 (CdAR&N #1 or 2). Purchased by the WP&YR in 1900. Cupola added in 1967. Cupola removed in 1996.
218	Lake Atlin (since 1946)	Jackson & Sharp Co.	1881	Originally, Stony Clove & Catskill Mountain R.R. Sold to F.M. Hicks & Co. (dealer) in 1899 or 1900. Purchased by the WP&YR in 1901.
220	Lake Dewey (since 1946)	Jackson & Sharp Co.	1881	Originally, Stony Clove & Catskill Mountain R.R. Sold to F.M. Hicks & Co. (dealer) in 1899 or 1900. Purchased by the WP&YR in 1901.
222	Lake Lindeman (since 1946)	Jackson & Sharp Co.	1883	Originally, Kaaterskill R.R. (The Kaaterskill R.R. was a connecting subsidiary of the Stony Clove & Catskill Mountain Railroad) Coaches sold to F.M. Hicks & Co. (dealer) in 1899 or 1900. Purchased by the WP&YR in 1901.
224	Lake Marsh (since 1946)	Jackson & Sharp Co.	1883	Originally, Kaaterskill R.R. (The Kaaterskill R.R. was a connecting subsidiary of the Stony Clove & Catskill Mountain R.R.) Coaches sold to F.M. Hicks & Co. (dealer) in 1899 or 1900. Purchased by the WP&YR in 1901.
226	2nd Lake Fraser (since 1962)	WP&YR	1903	Bunk car from 1960 to 1962. The 1st Lake Fraser had been 1st 200, from 1946 to 1968. From 1962 until 1968, both 1st 200 and #226 bore the name Lake Fraser.
228	........	WP&YR	1904	Destroyed by the 1932 Skagway roundhouse fire.
1st 230	........	WP&YR	1908	Open observation car from 1908 to 1921. Walled-in, in 1921. Passenger car from 1921 to 1942. Bunk car from 1942 to 1943. Destroyed by fire in 1943.
2nd 230	Lake Big Kalzes	Underframe: American Car & Foundry Co., Lot #TC-3263; body: WP&YR	2001	Built upon the underframe of Tank Car #70. Open observation car from 2002 to 2005. Walled-in, in 2005.
232	........	WP&YR	1908	Open observation car from 1908 to 1942. Used on the Taku Tram from 1917 to 1936. Walled-in, in 1942. Bunk car from 1942 to 1960. Renumbered to X6 in 1947. Scrapped in 1960.
234	Lake Cowley (since 1953)	most likely, Nevada-California-Oregon Railway	1892	Originally, N-C-O #6. Purchased by the WP&YR in 1916. Bunk car from 1945 to 1953. #X7 from 1947 to 1953. Back to Passenger Car #234 in 1953.
236	Lake Mayo (since 1946)	Harlan & Hollingsworth Corp.	1887	Originally, South Pacific Coast R.R. Coach #66. Sold to Nevada-California-Oregon Ry. via Atlantic Equipment Co. (dealer) in 1909 (N-C-O 2nd 4). Purchased by the WP&YR in 1916 (WP&YR #236).
238	1st Lake Watson (1951 to 2026)	WP&YR	1922	Donated to Nevada County Narrow Gauge Railroad Museum in 2026.
240	Lake Bennett (since 1946)	St. Charles Car Co.	1884	Originally, Arizona & New Mexico Ry. #3. Sold to Coronado R.R. in 1901 (C RR #3). The Coronado R.R. was abandoned in 1923. Car resold to United Commercial Co. (dealer). Purchased by the WP&YR in 1926.
242	Lake Teslin (since 1946)	American Car & Foundry Co. (Jeffersonville)	1903	Originally, Coronado R.R. #7. The Coronado R.R. was abandoned in 1923. Car sold to United Commercial Co. (dealer). Purchased by the WP&YR in 1926.
244	2nd Lake Emerald (since 1962)	Carter Brothers	1884	Originally, South Pacific Coast Railroad #59. Sold to Northwestern Pacific Railroad in 1908 (NWP #731). Car purchased by the WP&YR in 1927. Bunk car from 1960 to 1962. Converted back to passenger car in 1962. Retired in 2025. The 1st Lake Emerald had been Coach #254, from 1951 to 1957.
246	........	........	........	See, Coach #264.
248	........	........	........	See, Baggage Car #738.
250	........	Pullman Co., Lot #C1073, Plan #253.	1893	Originally, North Pacific Coast Railroad #22. The NPC became the North Shore R.R. in 1902 (NS #22). NS RR merged into the Northwestern Pacific Railroad in 1907 (NWP #713). Car purchased by the WP&YR in 1930. Destroyed by the 1932 Skagway roundhouse fire.
252	Lake Muncho (since 1951)	Pullman Co., Lot #C1073, Plan #253.	1893	Originally, North Pacific Coast Railroad #26. The NPC became the North Shore Railroad in 1902 (NS #26). NS Railroad merged into the Northwestern Pacific Railroad in 1907 (NWP #716). Car purchased by the WP&YR in 1930.
254	(1st Lake Emerald, 1951-1957) Lake Dezadeash (since 1963)	Pullman Co., Lot #C1073, Plan #253.	1893	Originally, North Pacific Coast Railroad #27. The NPC became the North Shore Railroad in 1902 (NS #27). North Shore Railroad merged into the Northwestern Pacific Railroad in 1907 (NWP #717). Car purchased by the WP&YR in 1932. Renumbered to X18, and its use of the name Lake Emerald was discontinued in 1957. Bunk car from 1957 to 1963. Converted back to passenger car and reassumed the #254 in 1963. However, in 1962, the name Lake Emerald had been reassigned to #244. Therefore, #254 was assigned the name Lake Dezadeash in 1963.
256	Lake LeBarge (1945-2016) Lake LaBerge (since 2016)	Pacific Car & Foundry Co.	1936	Purchased new. Used as the Royal Coach for the Queen and Duke of Edinburgh state visit to Whitehorse in 1959.
258	Lake Kluane (since 1946)	J. Hammond Car Co.	1893	Originally, Pacific Coast Railway #102. Purchased by the WP&YR in 1938.
260	Lake Tutshi (since 1946)	J. Hammond Car Co.	1893	Originally, Pacific Coast Railway #103. Purchased by the WP&YR in 1938.
262	1st Lake Summit (1950-1969)	J. Hammond Car Co.	1893	Originally, Pacific Coast Railway #105. Purchased by the WP&YR in 1938 as #105. Bunk car from 1938 to 1947. Renumbered to B05 in 1947. Later in 1947, converted back to a passenger car and renumbered to 262. Destroyed by the 1969 Skagway roundhouse fire.
264	Lake Aishihik (since 1948)	Carter Brothers	1885	Originally, San Joaquin & Sierra Nevada Railroad Ettie. SJ&SN merged into the Northern Ry. in 1888 (Northern Ry. #1011). Northern Railway merged into the Southern Pacific Co. in 1898 (SP #1011). Car leased to the South Pacific Coast Railroad from 1904 to 1906. Leased to the Nevada & California Railway from 1906 to 1908. Sold to Northwestern Pacific Railroad in 1908 (NWP #732). Purchased by the WP&YR in 1927 as #246. Renumbered to 264 in 1948.
266	Lake Schwatka (since 1963)	American Car & Foundry Co. (St. Charles), Lot #8337.	1918	Originally, Sumpter Valley Railway Coach #25. Purchased by the WP&YR in 1947 as #X5. Bunk car from 1947 to 1963. Converted back to a passenger car and renumbered to 266 in 1963.
267	Lake Portage (since 1988)	American Car & Foundry Co. (St. Charles), Lot #8338.	1918	Originally, Sumpter Valley Railway Combine #10. Purchased by the U.S. Army in 1943 for use on the WP&YR (USA #933). Tool car from 1943 to 1946. Transferred to the WP&YR in 1946 (1st 209). Returned to passenger service, and cupola added in 1946. Cupola removed, and converted to full-length passenger car in 1982. Renumbered to 267 in 1992.
268	Lake Lewes (since 1966)	American Car & Foundry Co. (St. Charles), Lot #8337.	1918	Originally, Sumpter Valley Railway Coach #26. Converted to a passenger and railway post office combine, most likely in 1928. Purchased by the WP&YR in 1947 as #X12. Bunk car from 1947 to 1966. Converted back to a full-length passenger car and renumbered to 268 in 1966.
270	Lake Kathleen (since 1967)	J. Hammond Car Co.	1893	Originally, Pacific Coast Railway Baggage Car #201. Purchased by WP&YR as Baggage Car 1st 207 in 1937. Cupola added in 1937. Cupola removed, converted to passenger car, and renumbered to 270 in 1967.
272	Lake Nisutlin (1967-2016)	WP&YR	1900	Originally, Baggage Car 1st 203. Cupola added in 1924. Cupola removed, converted to passenger car, and renumbered to 272 in 1967. Wrecked at White Pass in 2014. Scrapped in 2016
274	Lake Primrose	Coast Steel Fabricators, Ltd.	1969	Purchased new. Sold in 2011. Resold to Georgetown Loop Railroad in 2012 (GL #274).
276	1st Lake Big Salmon	Coast Steel Fabricators, Ltd.	1969	Purchased new. Sold in 2005. Resold to Edwards Railcar Co. in 2007.
278	1st Lake Fairweather	Coast Steel Fabricators, Ltd.	1969	Purchased new. Sold in 2005. Resold to Georgetown Loop Railroad in 2007 (GL #228). Renamed Silver Queen by Georgetown Loop Railroad.
280	1st Lake Dease	Coast Steel Fabricators, Ltd.	1969	Purchased new. Shipped out in 2012. Sold to the Colorado Railroad Museum in 2015 (Golden City & San Juan #80). Named South Table Mountain in 2023.
282	1st Lake Klukshu	Coast Steel Fabricators, Ltd.	1976	Purchased new. Sold in 2005. Resold to Georgetown Loop Railroad in 2007 (GL #282). Renamed Clear Creek by Georgetown Loop Railroad
284	1st Lake Takhini	Coast Steel Fabricators, Ltd.	1976	Purchased new. Sold in 2005. Resold to Georgetown Loop Railroad in 2007 (GL #284). Renamed Argentine by Georgetown Loop Railroad.
286	Lake Kusawa	Coast Steel Fabricators, Ltd.	1976	Purchased new. Shipped out in 2012. Sold to the Colorado Railroad Museum in 2015 (Golden City & San Juan #86).
288	1st Lake McClintock	Coast Steel Fabricators, Ltd.	1976	Purchased new. Sold in 2005. Resold in 2007.
290	Yukon River	Underframe: National Steel Car Corp.; body: WP&YR	1994	Built up from Flatcar #492.
300	Skagway River	Beartown Mechanical Design	1998	Purchased new.
302	Taiya River	Beartown Mechanical Design	1998	Purchased new.
304	Copper River	Beartown Mechanical Design	1998	Purchased new.
306	Norse River (1998-1999) Stikine River (since 1999)	Beartown Mechanical Design	1998	Purchased new. The car's original name misspelled the Nourse River's name by omitting the "u."
308	Klondike River	Beartown Mechanical Design	1998	Purchased new.
310	Mackenzie River	Beartown Mechanical Design	1998	Purchased new.
312	Tatshenshini River	Jeff Hamilton	2000	Purchased new.
314	Alsek River	Jeff Hamilton	2000	Purchased new.
316	Liard River	Jeff Hamilton	2000	Purchased new.
318	Taku River	Jeff Hamilton	2000	Purchased new.
320	Pelly River	Jeff Hamilton	2001	Purchased new.
322	Fortymile River	Jeff Hamilton	2001	Purchased new.
324	Porcupine River	Jeff Hamilton	2001	Purchased new.
326	Peel River	Jeff Hamilton	2001	Purchased new.
328	Stewart River	Jeff Hamilton	2001	Purchased new.
330	Peace River	Jeff Hamilton	2001	Purchased new.
332	Lake Johns	Jeff Hamilton, shop #HA200401	2004	Purchased new.
334	Thompson River	Jeff Hamilton, shop #HA200402	2004	Purchased new.
336	Lake Drury	Jeff Hamilton, shop #HA200403	2004	Purchased new.
338	Lake McQuesten	Jeff Hamilton, shop #HA200404	2004	Purchased new.
340	Lake Finlayson	Jeff Hamilton, shop #HA200405	2004	Purchased new.
342	Lake McNeil	Jeff Hamilton, shop #HA200406	2004	Purchased new.
344	Lake Munroe	Jeff Hamilton, shop #HA200407	2004	Purchased new.
346	Lake Pelly	Jeff Hamilton, shop #HA200408	2004	Purchased new.
348	2nd Lake Klukshu	Hamilton Mfg. Co., shop #001	2005	Purchased new. The 1st Lake Klukshu had been Coach #282, from 1976 to 2005.
350	2nd Lake McClintock	Hamilton Mfg. Co., shop #002	2005	Purchased new. The 1st Lake McClintock had been Coach #288, from 1976 to 2005.
352	2nd Lake Big Salmon	Hamilton Mfg. Co., shop #003	2005	Purchased new. The 1st Lake Big Salmon had been Coach #276, from 1969 to 2005.
354	2nd Lake Takhini	Hamilton Mfg. Co., shop #004	2005	Purchased new. The 1st Lake Takhini had been Coach #284, from 1976 to 2005.
356	2nd Lake Fairweather	Hamilton Mfg. Co., shop #005	2005	Purchased new. The 1st Lake Fairweather had been Coach #280, from 1969 to 2005.
358	Lake Hutshi	Hamilton Mfg. Co., shop #006	2005	Purchased new.
360	Lake Annie	Hamilton Mfg. Co., shop #007	2005	Purchased new.
362	Lake Crag	Hamilton Mfg. Co., shop #008	2005	Purchased new.
364	Lake Frances	Hamilton Mfg. Co., shop #009	2005	Purchased new.
366	Lake Choutla	Hamilton Mfg. Co., shop #010	2005	Purchased new.
368	Lake Wasson	Hamilton Mfg. Co., shop #2007-1	2007	Purchased new.
370	Lake Surprise	Hamilton Mfg. Co., shop #2007-_	2007	Purchased new.
372	Lake McConnell	Hamilton Mfg. Co., shop #2007-_	2007	Purchased new.
374	Lake Jennings	Hamilton Mfg. Co., shop #2007-_	2007	Purchased new.
376	Lake Squanga	Hamilton Mfg. Co., shop #2007-_	2007	Purchased new.
378	Whiting River	Hamilton Mfg. Co., shop #1205-12-378	2012	Hamilton Model ADA-12-15. Purchased new. Equipped with wheelchair lift.
380	Aishihik River	Hamilton Mfg. Co., shop #1205-12-382	2012	Hamilton Model PASS-12-15. Purchased new.
382	Nakina River	Hamilton Mfg. Co., shop #1205-12-380	2012	Hamilton Model PASS-12-15. Purchased new.
384	Lake Racine	Hamilton Mfg. Co., shop #1310384	2014	Hamilton Model ADA-14. Purchased new. Equipped with wheelchair lift.
386	Lake Goat	Hamilton Mfg. Co., shop #1310386	2014	Hamilton Model STD-26. Purchased new.
388	Lake Beaver	Hamilton Mfg. Co., shop #1310388	2014	Hamilton Model STD-26. Purchased new.
390	Lake Fox	Hamilton Mfg. Co., shop #1360-100-1	2015	Hamilton Model COMP-100. Purchased new.
401	Michael J. Heney	Hamilton Mfg. Co., shop #1320400	2014	Hamilton Model "Club." Purchased new. Club car. Originally, #400. Renumbered to 401 in 2018.
402	Samuel H. Graves	Hamilton Mfg. Co., shop #1320402	2014	Hamilton Model "Club." Purchased new. Club car.
501	3rd Lake Emerald (in 2019) Lake Lynx (since 2020)	Hamilton Mfg. Co., shop #001	2019	Purchased new. In 2018, a decision had been made to scrap Coach #244, 2nd Lake Emerald. Thus, when Coach #501 was built, the name Lake Emerald was thought to be available. But by 2020, Coach #244 still existed, and a revised decision was then made not to scrap it. Thus in 2020, Coach #501 needed a new name. Lake Lynx was the new name.
502	2nd Lake Watson (in 2019) Lake Wolf (since 2020)	Hamilton Mfg. Co., shop #002	2019	Purchased new. In 2018, a decision had been made to scrap Coach #238, 1st Lake Watson. Thus, when Coach #502 was built, the name Lake Watson was thought to be available. But by 2020, Coach #238 still existed, and a revised decision was then made not to scrap it. Thus in 2020, Coach #502 needed a new name. Lake Wolf was the new name.
503	2nd Lake Dease	Hamilton Mfg. Co., shop #003	2019	Purchased new. The 1st Lake Dease had been Coach #280, from 1969 to 2012.
504	Lake Kluahne (in 2019) Lake Moose (since 2020)	Hamilton Mfg. Co., shop #004	2019	Purchased new. In 2018, a decision had been made to scrap Coach #258, Lake Kluane. Thus, when Coach #504 was built, the name Lake Kluahne was thought to be available. But by 2020, Coach #258 still existed, and a revised decision was then made not to scrap it. Thus in 2020, Coach #504 needed a new name. Lake Moose was the new name.
505	Lake Partridge	Hamilton Mfg. Co., shop #005	2020	Purchased new.
506	Lake Couger	Hamilton Mfg. Co., shop #006	2020	Purchased new.
507	Lake Octopus	Hamilton Mfg. Co., shop #007	2020	Purchased new.
508	Lake Tincup	Hamilton Mfg. Co., shop #008	2020	Purchased new.
509	2nd Lake Spirit	Hamilton Mfg. Co.	2026	Purchased new. The 1st Lake Spirit had been Coach #214, from 1988 to 2025.
510	4th Lake Emerald	Hamilton Mfg. Co.	2026	Purchased new. The 1st Lake Emerald had been Coach #254, from 1951 to 1957. 2nd Lake Emerald had been Coach #244, from 1962 to 2025. 3rd Lake Emerald had been Coach #501, from 2019 to 2020.
511	2nd Lake Tagish	Hamilton Mfg. Co.	2026	Purchased new. The 1st Lake Tagish had been Coach #248, from 1946 to 2024.
512	Lake _______	Hamilton Mfg. Co.	2026	Purchased new.
705	........	Underframe: National Steel Car Corp.; body: WP&YR	1993	Baggage Car. Originally, WP&YR Coach 2nd 205 (Lake Chilkat). WP&YR Coach 2nd 205 had been built up from Flatcar #498 in 1993. Coach converted to Baggage Car #705 in 2026.
738	........	Harlan & Hollingsworth Corp.	1887	Baggage Car. Originally, South Pacific Coast Railroad Coach #65. Sold to Northwestern Pacific Railroad in 1907 (NWP #728). Car purchased by the WP&YR in 1928 (#248). Used on the Taku Tram from 1928 to 1936. Named 1st Lake Tagish from 1946 to 2024. Converted to Baggage Car #738 in 2024.
932	........	........	........	See, #X3.
USA 932	........	........	........	See, #X3.
USA 933	........	........	........	See, #267.
USA 934	........	........	........	See, #211.

== Existing White Pass freight train cars ==
Cars with dark grey have been scrapped, while cars with light grey have been either put on display, or sold to other railroads.

Number(s)	Type	Builder	Year(s) Built	Remarks
a. Boxcars	.............	.............	.............	All time boxcar total = 201 (including World War II U.S. Army cars). The following remain in existence:
708	Boxcar	Colorado & Southern Railway	1910	Capacity = 25 short tons (23 t). Originally, C&S #8336. Purchased by U.S. Army in 1943 for use on the WP&YR (USA #232914). Transferred to the WP&YR in 1946 (#708). Wash & shower car from 1960 until 1973. Tool car from 1973 to 1982. In baggage service in 1982. Back to tool car service beginning in 1988. Retired in 2009.
742	Boxcar	Colorado & Southern Railway	1910	Capacity = 25 short tons (23 t). Originally, C&S #8313. Purchased by U.S. Army in 1943 for use on the WP&YR (USA #232943). Transferred to the WP&YR in 1946 (#742). Retired in 1977. Reactivated in 1982. In baggage service from 1982 to 2008. To work service beginning in 2009. Retired by 2016.
b. Cabooses:	.............	.............	.............	All time caboose total = 27 (including World War II U.S. Army cars). The following remain in existence:
3rd 901	Extended Vision Caboose	WP&YR	1972	For details on 1st 901 and 2nd 901, see, note.
2nd 903	Extended Vision Caboose	WP&YR	1969	Sold to Midwest Central Railroad in 1991. For details on 1st 903, see, note.
2nd 905	Extended Vision Caboose	WP&YR	1968	Became U.S. Forest Service shelter at Denver, Alaska in 1994. For details on 1st 905, see, note.
909	Cupola Caboose with Flanger	Colorado & Southern Railway	1910	Originally, C&S boxcar. Purchased by U.S. Army in 1943. Cut down to caboose-flanger by Chicago Freight Car Parts Co. in 1943 for use on the WP&YR (USA #90857). Renumbered to 857 in 1944. Transferred to the WP&YR in 1946 (#909). Retired in 1968. Rebuilt in 1997. Restored to service in 1998. Retired again in 2019. Permanently laid up on static display with Rotary #1 in Skagway. For details on USA 909, see, note.
1st 911	Cupola Caboose	Sumpter Valley Railway	1904	Originally, Sumpter Valley Railway #3. Rebuilt in 1927. Purchased by U.S. Army in 1943 (USA #911). Retired in 1946. Sold to the WP&YR in 1947 (1st 911). Resold in 1947 to a private party who used it as a shed in Skagway, Alaska. Sent to Sumpter Valley Railroad in 1991 (SV #3). Restored to operation on Sumpter Valley Railway in 2006. For details on 3rd 911, see, note.
2nd 911	Cupola Caboose	Colorado & Southern Railway	1910	Originally, C&S boxcar. Purchased by U.S. Army in 1943. Converted to caboose by Chicago Freight Car Parts Co. in 1943 for use on the WP&YR (USA #90861). Renumbered to 861 in 1944. Sold to the WP&YR in 1947 (#861). Converted to Bunk Car #X14 in 1955. Named Katler's Castle, 1962~1965 (for Karl Kattler [1905-1971], WP&YR section foreman). Re-converted back to caboose and renumbered to 2nd 911 in 1967. Retired in 1972. Put on display at Skagway Museum in 2016. For details on 3rd 911, see, note.
c. Flatcars:	.............	.............	.............	All time flatcar total = 620 (including World War II U.S. Army cars). The following remain in existence:
1-3 and 5-6 (5 cars)	Flatcars	WP&YR	1900	Capacity = 1.05 tons. Single 4-wheel truck. No air brake. Used on the Taku Tram. Retired in 1951. No. 1 was a passenger car from 1900 to 1916 and a baggage car from 1917 to 1936. Two cars are on a platform at Taku Landing, British Columbia (2025). Two more cars have fallen under water at Taku Landing (by 2011). One car is at Scotia Bay (2025). All of these cars are in deteriorated condition. Numbers no longer visible.
4	Flatcar	WP&YR	1900	Capacity = 1.05 tons. Single 4-wheel truck. No air brake. Used on the Taku Tram. Retired in 1951. Moved to Skagway, Alaska in 1964. In deteriorated condition. Number no longer visible.
479, 481, and 484 to 490 (9 cars)	Container Flatcars	National Steel Car Corp.	1969	Capacity = 52.5 short tons (47.6 t). Purchased new.
737	Flatcar	Colorado & Southern Railway	1910	Capacity = 25 short tons (23 t). Originally, C&S boxcar. Purchased by U.S. Army in 1943. Cut down to flatcar by Chicago Freight Car Parts Co. in 1943 for use on the WP&YR (USA #334073). Sold to the WP&YR in 1947 (#737). Retired in 2017.
1000	Flatcar	WP&YR	1954	Capacity = 30 short tons (27 t). Arch bar trucks. Made from proposed – but unused – underframe for Passenger Car #258. Put on display at the Yukon Transportation Museum in 1988.
1001	Flatcar	WP&YR	1954	Capacity = 30 short tons (27 t). Arch bar trucks. Made from proposed – but unused – underframe for Passenger Car #260. Put on display at the Skagway Museum in 1988.
1002	Flatcar	WP&YR	1954	Capacity = 30 short tons (27 t). Made from unused passenger car underframe.
1003	Flatcar	Magor Car Corp., Lot #P-9920	1942	Capacity = 30 short tons (27 t). Originally, U.S. Navy (Hawaii). Trucks built for Navy in 1942 by American Steel Foundries. Car purchased by WP&YR in 1954.
1004	Flatcar	Magor Car Corp., Lot #P-9920	1942	Same remarks as for #1003, above.
1005	Flatcar	Koppel Industrial Car & Equipment Co.	1933	Same remarks as for #1003, above.
1006	Flatcar	Magor Car Corp., Lot #P-9920	1942	Same remarks as for #1003, above.
1007	Flatcar	Magor Car Corp., Lot #P-9920	1942	Same remarks as for #1003, above.
1009	Flatcar	Magor Car Corp., Lot #P-9920	1942	Same remarks as for #1003, above.
1010	Flatcar	Pressed Steel Car Co.	1945	Capacity = 30 short tons (27 t). Originally, U.S. Navy (Hawaii). Trucks built for Navy in 1942 by American Steel Foundries. Car purchased by WP&YR in 1956.
1011	Flatcar	Koppel Industrial Car & Equipment Co.	1933	Same remarks as for #1010, above.
1013	Flatcar	Pressed Steel Car Co.	1945	Same remarks as for #1010, above.
1016	Flatcar	WP&YR	1938~1956	Originally the replacement #56 tender underframe, built in 1938. Made into weed burner in 1941. Made into substitute underframe for Rotary #1 in 1942. Made into Flatcar R2 in 1944. Wrecked in 1951. Made into Flatcar #1016 in 1956.
1020	Flatcar	Pacific Car & Foundry Co.	1957	Capacity = 30 short tons (27 t). Purchased new.
1021	Flatcar	Pacific Car & Foundry Co.	1957	Capacity = 30 short tons (27 t). Purchased new.
1024	Flatcar	Pacific Car & Foundry Co.	1961	Capacity = 30 short tons (27 t). Purchased new.
1025	Flatcar	Pacific Car & Foundry Co.	1961	Capacity = 30 short tons (27 t). Purchased new.
1026	Flatcar	Pacific Car & Foundry Co.	1961	Capacity = 30 short tons (27 t). Purchased new.
1102, 1103, 1105, 1107, 1108, 1110, 1114, 1118, and 1120 (9 cars)	Flatcars	American Car & Foundry Co.	1942	Capacity = 30 short tons (27 t). Built as boxcars intended for the Ferrocarril del Estado (Argentine State Railway), but sold to the U.S. Navy in 1942. Purchased by WP&YR via Lou-Ann Trading Co. (dealer) and cut down to flatcars in 1954. No. 1105 was configured with railings in 2014 to act as a medical rescue car.
1127	Flatcar	Pullman Co., Lot #5706-A.	1942	Capacity = 30 short tons (27 t). Built as boxcar intended for the Ferrocarril del Estado (Argentine State Railway), but sold to U.S. Army (USA #23150). Cut down to underframe for Tank Car #29 in 1943. Made into flatcar in 1957 (#1127).
1128	Flatcar	Pullman Co., Lot #5706-A.	1942	Capacity = 30 short tons (27 t). Built as boxcar intended for the Ferrocarril del Estado (Argentine State Railway), but sold to U.S. Army (USA #23135). Cut down to idler car in 1944. Transferred to WP&YR in 1946 (#23135). Renumbered to #1st X9 in 1947. Became underframe of Tank Car #11 in 1952. Made into flatcar in 1959 (#1128). Put on display behind Loco #195, adjacent to Skagway Museum in 1988.
1129	Flatcar	Pullman Co., Lot #5706-A.	1942	Capacity = 30 short tons (27 t). Built as boxcar intended for the Ferrocarril del Estado (Argentine State Railway), but sold to U.S. Army (USA #23130). Cut down to underframe for Tank Car #25 in 1943. Transferred to WP&YR in 1946 (#23130). Became underframe of Tank Car #25 in 1943. Made into flatcar in 1950 (#1129).
1132, 1135, 1138, 1140, 1142, 1144, 1165, and 1174 (8 cars)	Flatcars	American Car & Foundry Co.	1942	Capacity = 30 short tons (27 t). Built as boxcars intended for the Ferrocarril del Estado (Argentine State Railway), but sold to the U.S. Navy in 1942. Sold to the Oahu Ry. in 1959, but not used by the Oahu Ry. Sold to WP&YR and cut down to flatcars in 1962.
1131, 1145, 1150, 1153, 1156, 1157, 1161, 1166, 1170, and 1173 (10 cars)	Flatcars	American Car & Foundry Co.	1942	Same remarks as for ##1132~1174 (8 cars), above. In addition: Nos. 1153 and 1173 to Georgetown Loop Railroad in 2007. No. 1150 to Kauai Plantation Railway in 2005. Nos. 1131, 1156, 1157, and 1170 to Midwest Central Railroad in 1995. Of these, #1157 resold to Georgetown Loop Railroad in 2011. Nos. 1145, 1161, and 1166 to Sumpter Valley Railway in 2005.
1181	Flatcar	American Car & Foundry Co.	1942	Capacity = 30 short tons (27 t). Built as boxcar intended for the Ferrocarril del Estado (Argentine State Railway), but sold to the U.S. Navy in 1942. Sold to Kahului Railroad and cut down to flatcar in 1961. Sold to WP&YR via Midwest Steel Corp. (dealer) in 1967. To Midwest Central Railroad in 1995, and resold to the Georgetown Loop Railroad in 2015.
1200	Depressed Center Flatcar	WP&YR	1957	Capacity = 30 short tons (27 t).
1201	Depressed Center Flatcar	Baldwin Locomotive Works (shop #62234) and WP&YR	1938 (Baldwin), 1962 (WP&YR)	Capacity = 30 short tons (27 t). Originally, Loco #70 tender underframe. Tender reassigned to Rotary #1 from 1950 to 1953. Reassigned to Loco #190 from 1953 to 1962. Underframe used to make Depressed Center Flatcar #1201 in 1962. Tender body shipped out of Skagway in 1979.
1202	Depressed Center Flatcar	WP&YR	1967	Capacity = 30 short tons (27 t).
1203	Depressed Center Flatcar	WP&YR	1968	Capacity = 40 short tons (36 t). Wrecked in collision on August 27, 2026.
d. Gondolas	.............	.............	.............	All time gondola total = 30. None remain in existence.
e. Hopper Cars:	.............	.............	.............	All time hopper car total = 31 (including multi-service cars). The following remain in existence:
640	Multi-Service Car (Ballast Car)	Canadian Car & Foundry Co., Lot #2247, Specification #F-76	1958	Capacity = 55 yd^{3} (42 m^{3}). Originally, 42-inch gauge, Canadian National Rys. (Newfoundland) #6794. Purchased by the WP&YR and converted to 3-foot gauge in 1990. Wrecked in a 2006 derailment. Repaired in 2013.
641	Multi-Service Car (Ballast Car)	Canadian Car & Foundry Co., Lot #2269, Specification #F-80	1959	Capacity = 55 yd^{3} (42 m^{3}). Originally, 42-inch gauge, Canadian National Rys. (Newfoundland) #6774. Purchased by the WP&YR and converted to 3-foot gauge in 1990. Wrecked in a 2006 derailment. Repaired in 2013.
642	Multi-Service Car (Ballast Car)	Canadian Car & Foundry Co., Lot #2269, Specification #F-80	1959	Capacity = 55 yd^{3} (42 m^{3}). Originally, 42-inch gauge, Canadian National Rys. (Newfoundland) #6765. Purchased by the WP&YR and converted to 3-foot gauge in 1990. Wrecked in a 2006 derailment. Repaired in 2013.
643	Multi-Service Car (Ballast Car)	Canadian Car & Foundry Co., Lot #2269, Specification #F-80	1959	Capacity = 55 yd^{3} (42 m^{3}). Originally, 42-inch gauge, Canadian National Rys. (Newfoundland) #6786. Purchased by the WP&YR and converted to 3-foot gauge in 1990.
644	Multi-Service Car (Ballast Car)	Canadian Car & Foundry Co., Lot #2269, Specification #F-80	1959	Capacity = 55 yd^{3} (42 m^{3}). Originally, 42-inch gauge, Canadian National Rys. (Newfoundland) #6758. Purchased by the WP&YR and converted to 3-foot gauge in 1990. Wrecked in a 2006 derailment. Repaired in 2013.
645	Multi-Service Car (Ballast Car)	Canadian Car & Foundry Co., Lot #2269, Specification #F-80	1959	Capacity = 55 yd^{3} (42 m^{3}). Originally, 42-inch gauge, Canadian National Rys. (Newfoundland) #6718. Purchased by the WP&YR and converted to 3-foot gauge in 1990. Wrecked in a 2006 derailment. Repaired in 2013.
646	Multi-Service Car (Ballast Car)	Canadian Car & Foundry Co., Lot #2269, Specification #F-80	1959	Capacity = 55 yd^{3} (42 m^{3}). Originally, 42-inch gauge, Canadian National Rys. (Newfoundland) #6772. Purchased by the WP&YR and converted to 3-foot gauge in 1990. Wrecked in a 2006 derailment. Repaired in 2013.
647	Multi-Service Car (Ballast Car)	Canadian Car & Foundry Co., Lot #2269, Specification #F-80	1959	Capacity = 55 yd^{3} (42 m^{3}). Originally, 42-inch gauge, Canadian National Rys. (Newfoundland) #6768. Purchased by the WP&YR and converted to 3-foot gauge in 1990.
672	3-Bay Hopper Car	East Broad Top R.R. & Coal Co.	1919	Capacity = 50 yd^{3} (38 m^{3}) of coal or 38 yd^{3} (29 m^{3}) of gravel (40 short tons (36 t)). Originally, EBT #1026. Purchased by WP&YR in 1968. To Sumpter Valley R.R. in 1991 (SV #1029).
674	3-Bay Hopper Car	East Broad Top R.R. & Coal Co.	1919	Capacity = 50 yd^{3} (38 m^{3}) of coal or 38 yd^{3} (29 m^{3}) of gravel (40 short tons (36 t)). Originally, EBT #1038. Purchased by WP&YR in 1968. To Sumpter Valley R.R. in 1991 (SV #674).
676	3-Bay Hopper Car	East Broad Top R.R. & Coal Co.	1919	Capacity = 50 yd^{3} (38 m^{3}) of coal or 38 yd^{3} (29 m^{3}) of gravel (40 short tons (36 t)). Originally, EBT #1028. Purchased by WP&YR in 1968. To Lahaina, Kaanapali & Pacific R.R. in 1995. Used in work service until sometime between 1999 & 2005, when it was put on static display. Fate to be determined as of 2026.
678	3-Bay Hopper Car	East Broad Top R.R. & Coal Co.	1914	Capacity = 50 yd^{3} (38 m^{3}) of coal or 38 yd^{3} (29 m^{3}) of gravel (40 short tons (36 t)). Originally, EBT #858. Purchased by WP&YR in 1968. Stored since 2002. Sale to the Kauai Plantation Railway was contemplated in 2005, but was declined.
679	3-Bay Hopper Car	East Broad Top R.R. & Coal Co.	1919	Capacity = 50 yd^{3} (38 m^{3}) of coal or 38 yd^{3} (29 m^{3}) of gravel (40 short tons (36 t)). Originally, EBT #1047. Purchased by WP&YR in 1968. To Sumpter Valley R.R. in 1991 (SV #679).
680	3-Bay Hopper Car	East Broad Top R.R. & Coal Co.	1919	Capacity = 50 yd^{3} (38 m^{3}) of coal or 38 yd^{3} (29 m^{3}) of gravel (40 short tons (36 t)). Originally, EBT #1024. Purchased by WP&YR in 1968. To Sumpter Valley R.R. in 1991 (SV #680).
682	3-Bay Hopper Car	East Broad Top R.R. & Coal Co.	1927	Capacity = 50 yd^{3} (38 m^{3}) of coal or 38 yd^{3} (29 m^{3}) of gravel (40 short tons (36 t)). Originally, EBT #1072. Purchased by WP&YR in 1968. To Sumpter Valley R.R. in 1991 (SV #682).
683	3-Bay Hopper Car	East Broad Top R.R. & Coal Co.	1917	Capacity = 50 yd^{3} (38 m^{3}) of coal or 38 yd^{3} (29 m^{3}) of gravel (40 short tons (36 t)). Originally, EBT #960. Purchased by WP&YR in 1968. To Sumpter Valley R.R. in 1991 (SV #960).
f. Refrigerator Cars	.............	.............	.............	All time refrigerator car total = 31 (including World War II U.S. Army cars). None remain in existence.
g. Side Dump Cars:	.............	.............	.............	All time side dump car total = 53. The following remain in existence:
One of ##30-39	Chassis of Center-Pivot, Side-Lift Dump Car	unknown	1890s	Capacity of bin had been 4 cubic yards. Single 4-wheel truck. No air brake. Originally owned by W. D. Hofius & Co. Sold to WP&YR in 1899 for use during construction of railroad. Chassis observed in 2018 at Alaska 360 Dredge Town, adjacent Klondike Highway Mile 2.2, Skagway, Alaska.
650	Side-Pivot, Drop-Side, Air-Dump Car	Eastern Car Co., shop #16-139	1958	Capacity = 16 yd^{3} (12 m^{3}). Originally, 42-inch gauge, Canadian National Rys. (Newfoundland) #15016. Purchased by WP&YR and converted to 3-foot gauge in 1989.
651	Side-Pivot, Drop-Side, Air-Dump Car	Eastern Car Co., shop #16-138	1958	Capacity = 16 yd^{3} (12 m^{3}). Originally, 42-inch gauge, Canadian National Rys. (Newfoundland) #15015. Purchased by WP&YR and converted to 3-foot gauge in 1989.
652	Side-Pivot, Drop-Side, Air-Dump Car	Eastern Car Co., shop #16-140	1958	Capacity = 16 yd^{3} (12 m^{3}). Originally, 42-inch gauge, Canadian National Rys. (Newfoundland) #15010. Purchased by WP&YR and converted to 3-foot gauge in 1989.
653	Side-Pivot, Drop-Side, Air-Dump Car	Eastern Car Co., shop #16-129	1958	Capacity = 16 yd^{3} (12 m^{3}). Originally, 42-inch gauge, Canadian National Rys. (Newfoundland) #15006. Purchased by WP&YR and converted to 3-foot gauge in 1989.
654	Side-Pivot, Drop-Side, Air-Dump Car	Eastern Car Co., shop #16-134	1958	Capacity = 16 yd^{3} (12 m^{3}). Originally, 42-inch gauge, Canadian National Rys. (Newfoundland) #15011. Purchased by WP&YR and converted to 3-foot gauge in 1989.
655	Side-Pivot, Drop-Side, Air-Dump Car	Eastern Car Co., shop #16-121	1958	Capacity = 16 yd^{3} (12 m^{3}). Originally, 42-inch gauge, Canadian National Rys. (Newfoundland) #15005. Purchased by WP&YR and converted to 3-foot gauge in 1989.
656	Side-Pivot, Drop-Side, Air-Dump Car	Eastern Car Co., shop #16-128	1958	Capacity = 16 yd^{3} (12 m^{3}). Originally, 42-inch gauge, Canadian National Rys. (Newfoundland) #15004. Purchased by WP&YR and converted to 3-foot gauge in 1989.
657	Side-Pivot, Drop-Side, Air-Dump Car	Eastern Car Co., shop #16-136	1958	Capacity = 16 yd^{3} (12 m^{3}). Originally, 42-inch gauge, Canadian National Rys. (Newfoundland) #15013. Purchased by WP&YR and converted to 3-foot gauge in 1989.
661	Ralson-Type Drop-Bottom Dump Car	Pacific Car & Foundry Co.	1940	Capacity = 22 yd^{3} (17 m^{3}). Arch bar trucks. Purchased new. Originally #801. Renumbered to 861 in 1947. Renumbered to 661 in 1960. Sold to Sumpter Valley R.R. in 1985 (SV #661). Wedge snowplow added between 2022 & 2026.
662	Ralson-Type Drop-Bottom Dump Car	Pacific Car & Foundry Co.	1940	Capacity = 22 yd^{3} (17 m^{3}). Arch bar trucks. Purchased new. Originally #802. Renumbered to 862 in 1947. Renumbered to 662 in 1960. Sold to Sumpter Valley R.R. in 1991 (SV #86).
663	Ralson-Type Drop-Bottom Dump Car	Pacific Car & Foundry Co.	1940	Capacity = 22 yd^{3} (17 m^{3}). Arch bar trucks. Purchased new. Originally #803. Renumbered to 863 in 1947. Renumbered to 663 in 1960. Sold to Sumpter Valley R.R. in 1991 (SV #663). Resold back to WP&YR in 2005. Put on display at Skagway Museum in 2016.
664	Ralson-Type Drop-Bottom Dump Car	Pacific Car & Foundry Co.	1940	Capacity = 22 yd^{3} (17 m^{3}). Arch bar trucks. Purchased new. Originally #804. Renumbered to 864 in 1947. Renumbered to 664 in 1960. Sold to Sumpter Valley R.R. in 1991 (SV #664).
h. Stock Cars	.............	.............	.............	All time stock car total = 35. None remain in existence.
i. Tank Cars:	.............	.............	.............	All time tank car total = 64 (including World War II U.S. Army cars). The following remain in existence:
8	Tank Car	Standard Oil Co.	between 1903 & 1906	Shell = 6,480 US gal (24,500 L; 5,400 imp gal), dome ≈ 136 US gal (510 L; 113 imp gal). Arch bar trucks. Originally, a Union Tank Car Co. standard gauge Class V (frameless) tank car. Built between 1903 & 1906 1906, bearing a number less than 10000. Renumbered to 10844 about 1911. Purchased by WP&YR and converted to 3-foot gauge in 1939. Donated to the BC Forest Discovery Centre, Duncan, British Columbia, in 1978 (BCFDC #8). Unusual and historic tank car because it retained its original UTLX Class V architecture.
10	Tank Car	Tank: Standard Oil Co.; replacement underframe: Pullman Co.	Tank: between 1906 & 1911; replacement underframe: 1942	Shell ≈ 6,500 US gal (25,000 L; 5,400 imp gal). Originally, a standard gauge Union Tank Car Co. (UTLX) Class V (frameless) tank car. Purchased by WP&YR and converted 3-foot gauge in 1941. Mounted on underframe of Gondola #110 in 1949. Stored since 2002.
27	Tank Car	Tank: unknown; replacement underframe: American Car & Foundry Co., Lot #5233	Tank: 1913; replacement underframe: 1908	Shell = 6,672 US gal (25,260 L; 5,556 imp gal), dome = 151 US gal (570 L; 126 imp gal). Tank was originally on General Petroleum Corp. (GPCX) #101, a standard gauge tank car. Car retired from GPCX in 1941. Tank sold to U.S. Army in 1943. Mounted on WP&YR Flatcar #319 in 1944 (USA 27). Tank transferred to the WP&YR in 1946 (#27). Re-mounted on the underframe of Gondola #108 in 1952. Re-mounted on the underframe of Tank Car #3 in 1956. Relegated to Shops use only beginning in 1963. Re-mounted on Flatcar #316 in 1968. Stored since 2002.
28	Tank Car	Tank: Standard Oil Co.; replacement underframe: Pullman Co.	Tank: between 1903 & 1906; replacement underframe: 1942	Shell = 6,481 US gal (24,530 L; 5,397 imp gal), dome = 190 US gal (720 L; 160 imp gal). Originally, a Union Tank Car Co. (UTLX) standard gauge UTLX Class V (frameless) tank car. Built between 1903 & 1906, bearing a number less than 10000. Renumbered to 15744 about 1912. Purchased by WP&YR and mounted Flatcar #325 in 1949. Re-mounted on the underframe of Gondola #116 in 1950. Put on display at the Yukon Transportation Museum in 1990, posing as #42 (fantasy number).
Fantasy 42	Tank Car	.............	...........	See, #28.
50	Tank Car	Tank: Standard Steel Car Co.; replacement underframe: Denver & Rio Grande Western R.R.	Tank: 1907; replacement underframe: 1927	Shell = 6,383 US gal (24,160 L; 5,315 imp gal), dome = 150 US gal (570 L; 120 imp gal). Originally, Union Tank Car Co. (UTLX) #13084, a standard gauge UTLX Class X (center sill) tank car. Center sill replaced by small underframe in 1927, in order to convert to 3-foot gauge. Upon conversion, it ran on the D&RGW. Type E internal steam heating pipes installed in 1928. Renumbered to UTLX 88112 in 1947. Renumbered to UTLX 11024 in 1956. Purchased by WP&YR in 1963. To Cumbres & Toltec Scenic R.R. in 1991 (UTLX #13084).
51	Tank Car	Tank: Standard Steel Car Co.; replacement underframe: Denver & Rio Grande Western R.R.	Tank: 1915; replacement underframe: 1927	Shell = 6,374 US gal (24,130 L; 5,307 imp gal), dome = 209 US gal (790 L; 174 imp gal). Originally, Union Tank Car Co. (UTLX) #12739, a standard gauge UTLX Class X (center sill) tank car. Center sill replaced by small underframe in 1927, in order to convert to 3-foot gauge. Upon conversion, it ran on the D&RGW. Type E internal steam heating pipes installed in 1928. Renumbered to UTLX 88113 in 1947. Renumbered to UTLX 11025 in 1956. Purchased by WP&YR in 1963. To Cumbres & Toltec Scenic R.R. in 1991 (UTLX #12739).
53	Tank Car	Tank: Pressed Steel Car Co.; replacement underframe: Pullman Co.	Tank: 1907; replacement underframe: 1942	Shell = 6,379 US gal (24,150 L; 5,312 imp gal), dome = 154 US gal (580 L; 128 imp gal). Originally, Union Tank Car Co. (UTLX) #12838, a standard gauge UTLX Class X (center sill) tank car. Center sill replaced by small underframe in 1927, in order to convert to 3-foot gauge. Upon conversion, it ran on the Denver & Rio Grande Western R.R. Type E internal steam heating pipes installed in 1928. Renumbered to UTLX 88107 in 1947. Renumbered to UTLX 11019 in 1956. Purchased by WP&YR in 1963. Tank re-mounted on Flatcar #106 in 1980. Water car.
58	Tank Car	Tank: Standard Oil Co.-Buffalo Works; replacement underframe: Denver & Rio Grande Western R.R.	Tank: 1907; replacement underframe: 1930	Shell = 6,487 US gal (24,560 L; 5,402 imp gal), dome = 160 US gal (610 L; 130 imp gal). Originally, Union Tank Car Co. (UTLX) #12770, a standard gauge UTLX Class X (center sill) tank car. Center sill replaced by small underframe in 1930, in order to convert to 3-foot gauge. Upon conversion, it ran on the D&RGW. Type W internal steam heating pipes installed in 1937. Renumbered to UTLX 88125 in 1947. Renumbered to UTLX 11027 in 1956. Purchased by WP&YR in 1963. To Colorado R.R. Museum in 1991 (UTLX #88125).
59	Tank Car	Tank: Standard Steel Car Co.; replacement underframe: Denver & Rio Grande Western R.R.	Tank: 1907; replacement underframe: 1927	Shell = 6,384 US gal (24,170 L; 5,316 imp gal), dome = 151 US gal (570 L; 126 imp gal). Originally, Union Tank Car Co. (UTLX) #12976, a standard gauge UTLX Class X (center sill) tank car. Center sill replaced by small underframe in 1927, in order to convert to 3-foot gauge. Upon conversion, it ran on the D&RGW. Type E internal steam heating pipes installed in 1928. Renumbered to UTLX 88110 in 1947. Renumbered to UTLX 11022 in 1956. Purchased by WP&YR in 1963. To Georgetown Loop R.R. in 1991 (#59). To Colorado R.R. Museum in 2004 (#59). To South Park Rail Society at Como, Colorado in 2026 (“Conoco”).
60	Tank Car	Tank: American Car & Foundry Co., Lot #5141; replacement underframe: American Car & Foundry Co.	Tank: 1907; replacement underframe: 1942	Shell = 6,424 US gal (24,320 L; 5,349 imp gal), dome = 150 US gal (570 L; 120 imp gal). Originally, Union Tank Car Co. (UTLX) #13236, a standard gauge UTLX Class X (center sill) tank car. Center sill replaced by small underframe in 1924, in order to convert to 3-foot gauge. Upon conversion, it ran on the Denver & Rio Grande Western R.R. Type W internal steam heating pipes installed in 1937. Renumbered to UTLX 88128 in 1947. Renumbered to UTLX 11030 in 1956. Purchased by WP&YR in 1963. Tank re-mounted on Flatcar #1178 in 1980. Sold to Sumpter Valley R.R. in 2005. Tank was mounted on the S.V. R.R. fire car’s underframe. Underframe (ex-#1178) became underframe for SV Fire Car #0178.
61	Tank Car	Tank: American Car & Foundry Co., Lot #5141; replacement underframe: Denver & Rio Grande Western R.R.	Tank: 1907; replacement underframe: 1927	Shell = 6,330 US gal (24,000 L; 5,270 imp gal), dome = 152 US gal (580 L; 127 imp gal). Originally, Union Tank Car Co. (UTLX) #13172, a standard gauge UTLX Class X (center sill) tank car. Center sill replaced by small underframe in 1927, in order to convert to 3-foot gauge. Upon conversion, it ran on the D&RGW. Type E internal steam heating pipes installed in 1928. Renumbered to UTLX 88104 in 1947. Renumbered to UTLX 11016 in 1956. Purchased by WP&YR in 1963. To Sumpter Valley R.R. in 1991 (SV #61).
62	Tank Car	Tank: American Car & Foundry Co., Lot #5141; replacement underframe: Denver & Rio Grande Western R.R.	Tank: 1907; replacement underframe: 1927	Shell = 6,339 US gal (24,000 L; 5,278 imp gal), dome = 154 US gal (580 L; 128 imp gal). Originally, Union Tank Car Co. (UTLX) #13130, a standard gauge UTLX Class X (center sill) tank car. Center sill replaced by small underframe in 1927, in order to convert to 3-foot gauge. Upon conversion, it ran on the D&RGW. Type E internal steam heating pipes installed in 1928. Renumbered to UTLX 88101 in 1947. Renumbered to UTLX 11013 in 1956. Purchased by WP&YR in 1963. To Cumbres & Toltec Scenic R.R. in 1991 (UTLX #12962).
63	Tank Car	Tank: American Car & Foundry Co., Lot #5141; replacement underframe: Denver & Rio Grande Western R.R.	Tank: 1907; replacement underframe: 1927	Shell = 6,344 US gal (24,010 L; 5,282 imp gal), dome = 151 US gal (570 L; 126 imp gal). Originally, Union Tank Car Co. (UTLX) #13168, a standard gauge UTLX Class X (center sill) tank car. Center sill replaced by small underframe in 1927, in order to convert to 3-foot gauge. Upon conversion, it ran on the D&RGW. Type E internal steam heating pipes installed in 1928. Renumbered to UTLX 88103 in 1947. Renumbered to UTLX 11015 in 1956. Purchased by WP&YR in 1963. To Cumbres & Toltec Scenic R.R. in 1991 (UTLX #13168).
64	Tank Car	Tank: Pressed Steel Car Co.; replacement underframe: Denver & Rio Grande Western R.R.	Tank: 1907; replacement underframe: 1927	Shell = 6,383 US gal (24,160 L; 5,315 imp gal), dome = 151 US gal (570 L; 126 imp gal). Originally, standard gauge Union Tank Car Co. (UTLX) #12872, a standard gauge UTLX Class X (center sill) tank car. Center sill replaced by small underframe in 1927, in order to convert to 3-foot gauge. Upon conversion, it ran on the D&RGW. Type E internal steam heating pipes installed in 1928. Renumbered to UTLX 88100 in 1947. Renumbered to UTLX 11012 in 1956. Car purchased by WP&YR in 1963. To Colorado R.R. Museum in 1991 (UTLX #12918).
65	Tank Car	Tank: Standard Oil Co.-Buffalo Works; replacement underframe: Denver & Rio Grande Western R.R.	Tank: 1907; replacement underframe: 1927	Shell = 6,407 US gal (24,250 L; 5,335 imp gal), dome = 160 US gal (610 L; 130 imp gal). Originally, Union Tank Car Co. (UTLX) #12757, a standard gauge UTLX Class X (center sill) tank car. Center sill replaced by small underframe in 1927, in order to convert to 3-foot gauge. Upon conversion, it ran on the D&RGW. Type E internal steam heating pipes installed in 1928. Purchased by WP&YR in 1963. To Cumbres & Toltec Scenic R.R. in 1991 (UTLX #12757).

== Existing White Pass work equipment ==
cars with light grey have been either put on display, or sold to other railroads.

Number or Name	Type	Builder	Year built	Remarks
......	............	.................	........	All time work equipment total = 59 (including World War II U.S. Army equipment). The following remain in existence:
Rotary#1	Rotary Snowplow	Cooke Locomotive & Machine Works, shop #56	1899	Train unit. Steam powered rotary wheel. Purchased new. Retired in 1962. Restored to service in 1995. Retired again in 2019. On display at the Skagway depot. Tender rebuilt in 1942, by substituting the second #56 tender underframe. Rotary #1 received the original #191 or 194 tender from 1944 to 1949. Received original #80 tender (ex-SV #18) from 1949 to 1950. Received original #70 tender from 1950 to 1953. Received original #190 tender from 1953 to 2019. See, note. Original Rotary #1 tender underframe was used to make Flatcar #102 in 1942 and was scrapped in 1947. Tender body was placed as riprap along the Skagway River, at Mile Post 2.5, in 1949.
Rotary #2	Rotary Snowplow	Cooke Locomotive & Machine Works, shop #61	1900	Train unit. Steam powered rotary wheel. Purchased new. Retired in 1963. Sold to Sumpter Valley Railway in 1977. Put on display at Breckenridge, Colorado, in 1989 as Denver, Leadville & Gunnison Ry. #01 (fantasy designation). Tender rebuilt in 1941, substituting a steel underframe for the wood underframe. Rotary #2 received the original #57 tender from 1942 to 1944. Received the original #191 or 194 tender from 1944 to 1949. Received original #81 tender (ex-SV #50) from 1949 to 1951. Received the original #71 tender from 1951 to 1953. Received the original #192 tender from 1953 to 1977. Received tender from Chicago, Burlington & Quincy Railroad standard gauge Loco #2901 (4-6-2, Baldwin #34512, 1910), when put on display in 1989. Substitute Rotary #2 underframe used to make Flatcar R1 in 1942, used to make the underframe of Crane R1 in 1944, and scrapped in 1969.
Rotary #3 (now under landfill at Mile Post 4.7)	Rotary Snowplow	Cooke Locomotive & Machine Works, shop #25	1899	Train unit. Steam powered rotary wheel. Originally, Denver & Rio Grande R.R. #2. Re-designated “ON” in 1907. Became Denver & Rio Grande Western R.R. ON in 1921. Purchased by U.S. Army in 1942 (USA #980). Officially renumbered to 3 in 1943, but never physically renumbered to 3. Retired in 1944 or 1945. Sold to the WP&YR in 1947 (#3). Placed as riprap along the Skagway River at Mile Post 4.7 in October 1967. Original Rotary #3 tender made from the former tender of D&RG #243 (2-8-0, Baldwin #5670, 1881), said tender with its underframe affixed to the top of a second D&RG 2-8-0 tender underframe. Tender body placed as riprap along the Skagway River, at Mile Post 2.5, in October 1949.
Claws #1	Right Rail Spike Puller	Nordco, Inc., shop #403	1992	Track unit. Self-propelled, Diesel-hydraulic. Nordco Claws Model LS. 31 H.P. Deutz AG F2L1011 engine. Originally owned by Kansas City Southern Railway. Purchased in 2004 via North American Equipment Sales Co. (dealer). Converted to 3-foot gauge by N.A. Equip. Sales.
Claws #2	Left Rail Spike Puller	Rexnord, Inc. (Nordco, Inc. since 1987), shop #129	1984	Track unit. Self-propelled, Diesel-hydraulic. Rexnord/Nordberg Claws Model LS. Originally owned by Atlas Railroad Construction, LLC. Purchased in 2004 via North American Equipment Sales Co. (dealer). Converted to 3-foot gauge by N.A. Equip. Sales.
Hydra-Spiker	Spiker	Rexnord, Inc. (Nordco, Inc. since 1987), shop #151	1984	Track unit. Self-propelled, Diesel-hydraulic. Rexnord/Nordberg Hydra-Spiker Model B. Purchased in 2004 via North American Equipment Sales Co. (dealer). Previous owner unknown. Converted to 3-foot gauge by N.A. Equip. Sales.
Rail Welder	Rail Welder	Teleweld, Inc.	2022	2-unit, push car, machine. Purchased new.
Tie Crane	Tie Crane	Kershaw Mfg. Co.	1994~1998	Track unit. Self-propelled, Diesel-hydraulic. Kershaw Model 12-5. Deere & Co. engine. Originally, Alaska Railroad. Purchased in 2018 via Hamilton Mfg. Co. (dealer). Converted to 3-foot gauge by Hamilton. Sold to Durango & Silverton Narrow Gauge in 2020 (D&SNG #TC-10).
Tie Master #1	Tie Exchanger	RCC Materials & Equipment Corp., shop #B9302012AWP	1994	Track unit. Self-propelled, but usually transported on push car to and from work sites. 18 hp (13 kW) Briggs & Stratton Corp. Vanguard V-8 gasoline engine. Purchased new.
Tie Master #2	Tie Exchanger	RCC Materials & Equipment Corp.	1994	Same remarks as for Tie Master #1, above.
Tie Master #3	Tie Exchanger	RCC Materials & Equipment Corp., shop #B9907058AWP	1999	Same remarks as for Tie Master #1, above.
26-3	Ballast Regulator	Kershaw Mfg. Co., shop #C26-108	1989	Track unit. Self-propelled, Diesel-hydraulic. Kershaw Model 26-3-1. 185 hp (138 kW) General Motors Corp. 3-53 engine. Purchased new.
KTR 450	Tie Replacer	Knox Kershaw Inc., shop #450-018-25	2025	Track unit. Self-propelled, Diesel-hydraulic. Knox Kershaw Model KTR 450. 121 hp (90 kW) Cummins Engine Co. QSB4.5 engine. Purchased new.
KNG 800	Ballast Regulator	Knox Kershaw Inc., shop #800-107-19	2019	Track unit. Self-propelled, Diesel-hydraulic. Knox Kershaw Model KNG 800. 260 hp (190 kW) Cummins Engine Co. QSB6.7 engine. Purchased new.
950	Tie Crane	Pandrol Jackson, Inc., shop #151893	1995	Track unit. Self-propelled, Diesel-hydraulic. Pandrol Jackson Model 950. 71 hp (53 kW) Deere & Co. 4039D engine. Crane engine = 76 hp (57 kW) Cummins Engine Co. 4BT Diesel. Purchased new.
KTC 1200	Tie Crane with Diamond Mower	Knox Kershaw Inc., shop #1200-300-19	2019	Track unit. Self-propelled, Diesel-hydraulic. Knox Kershaw Model KTC 1200. 110 H.P. Cummins Engine Co. QSB4.5 Diesel. Purchased new.
2067	Ballast Tamper	Canron, Inc., shop #4370977	1975	Track unit. Self-propelled, Diesel-mechanical. Canron Model VPSJW. Has 97 hp (72 kW) General Motors Corp. 3-53 engine. Purchased new.
2154	Track Liner	Fairmont Railway Motors, Inc., shop #240128	1975	Track unit. Self-propelled, Diesel-hydraulic. Fairmont Model W111-B2 (Z36). Has 97 hp (72 kW) General Motors Corp. 3-53 engine. Purchased new. Sometimes called a "spud" liner.
2400	Ballast Tamper	Pandrol Jackson, Inc., shop #151967	1995	Track unit. Self-propelled, Diesel-hydraulic. Pandrol Jackson Model 2400. Has 100 hp (75 kW) Cummins Inc. 4BT engine. Purchased new.
6700SJ2	Ballast Tamper and Track Liner	Harsco Corp., shop #153924	2020	Track unit. Self-propelled, Diesel-hydraulic. Harsco Model 6700SJ2. Has 280 hp (210 kW) Cummins Engine Co. OSCT3 engine. Purchased new.

== Existing White Pass inspection track units ==
cars with light grey have been either put on display, or sold to other railroads.

Number	Type	Builder	Year built	Remarks
......	............	.................	...............	All time track motor car total = 76 (including World War II U.S. Army cars). The following remain in existence:
FP J542	Road-Rail Vehicle	Ford Motor Co., VIN 1FTSX21Y36EA48172, and Hamilton Mfg. Co.	2016	Made from 2006 Ford F-250 SRW pickup truck. 385 hp (287 kW) V-8 gasoline engine. Alaska License JFP J542.
GPT 706	Road-Rail Vehicle	Ford Motor Co., VIN 1FT7W2B69DEB52216, and Hamilton Mfg. Co.	2016	Made from 2013 Ford F-250 SRW pickup truck. 383 hp (286 kW) V-8 gasoline engine. Alaska License GPT 706.
LCN 476	Road-Rail Vehicle	Ford Motor Co., VIN 1FD0W5HY1KEF04516, and Mitchell Equipment Corp.	2021	Made from 2019 Ford F-550 SRW cab and chassis. 362 hp (270 kW) V-10 gasoline engine. Alaska License LCN 476.
LCN 477	Road-Rail Vehicle	Ford Motor Co., VIN 1FD0W5HYXKEF04515, and Mitchell Equipment Corp.	2021	Made from 2019 Ford F-550 SRW cab and chassis. 362 hp (270 kW) V-10 gasoline engine. Alaska License LCN 477.
2001	Inspection Car	Fairmont Railway Motors, Inc., shop #231549	1968	Gasoline-mechanical. Fairmont Model M15-B1 (Z36). Has 8 hp (6.0 kW) Fairmont RO6-P engine. Purchased new. No cab. Sold by 1996.
2003	Inspection Car	Fairmont Railway Motors, Inc., shop #231551	1968	Gasoline-mechanical. Fairmont Model M15-B1 (Z36). Has 8 hp (6.0 kW) Fairmont RO6-P engine. Purchased new. No cab. Put on display in the Skagway Airport between 2001 & 2012.
2009	Gang Trailer	WP&YR	between 1969 & 1976	Push car with fully enclosed cab. Has manual brake. Cab formerly on Gang Car #2013 may have been installed between 1982 & 1990. Extensively, if not entirely, rebuilt between 2003 & 2007.
2010	Gang Car	Fairmont Railway Motors, Inc. shop #227447	1965	Gasoline-mechanical. Fairmont Model A5-E1 (Z36). Original and replacement engines both 35 hp (26 kW) Waukesha Motor Co. Model FC. Purchased new. Windshield applied at factory. Cab by WP&YR, utilizing factory windshield. Retired in 1979. Put on display at Yukon Transportation Museum between 1990 & 2001.
most likely, 2017	Inspection Car	Fairmont Railway Motors, Ltd., West Toronto, Ontario	1969	Gasoline-mechanical. Fairmont Model M19-H (Z36). Had 9 hp (6.7 kW) Fairmont RO-C engine. Purchased by Mannix Co. in 1969 for WP&YR track rehabilitation contract (Mannix #81-20xx). Transferred to WP&YR in 1970. Transferred to Sumpter Valley Railway between 1991 & 1993 (SV M-31).
2018	Gang Car	Fairmont Railway Motors, Inc., shop #237978	1973	Gasoline-mechanical. Fairmont Model A6-F3-3 (Z36). Has 103 hp (77 kW) Ford Motor Co. 240 engine. Purchased new. Cab roof and ends applied at factory. Cab sides by WP&YR.
2019	Gang Car	Fairmont Railway Motors, Inc., shop #237993	1973	Same remarks as for #2018, above.
2020	Gang Car	Fairmont Railway Motors, Inc., shop #237994	1973	Same remarks as for #2018, above.
2021	Gang Car	Fairmont Railway Motors, Inc., shop #241349	1976	Gasoline-mechanical. Fairmont Model A6-F4-1 (Z36). Has 122 hp (91 kW) Ford Motor Co. 300 engine. Purchased new. Cab roof and ends applied at factory. Cab sides by WP&YR.
2022	Gang Car	Fairmont Railway Motors, Inc., shop #241350	1976	Same remarks as for #2021, above.
2024	Gang Car	Fairmont Railway Motors, Inc., shop #242263	1976	Same remarks as for #2021, above.
2044	Gang Car	Fairmont Railway Motors, Inc., shop #244678	1978	Same remarks as for #2021, above.
2055	Inspection Car	Chassis: Patrick W. "Smitty" Smith; body: WP&YR	chassis: late 1990s; body: 2005	Gasoline-mechanical. Has 14 hp (10 kW) Fairmont Railway Motors, Inc. RK-B engine (1955~1979, ex-Arizona & California Railroad). Chassis and engine once on a standard gauge inspection car built in the late 1990s by "Smitty" Smith for his own use. Converted to 3-foot gauge after 1999. Sold to WP&YR and new cab installed in 2005. Never used by WP&YR. Put on display in Carcross depot in 2009.

== Former White Pass flatcars now serving as underframes ==
cars with light grey have been either put on display, or sold to other railroads.

Former WP&YR Flatcar Number(s)	Builder	Year built	Now Serving as Underframe for:	Remarks
underframe of Tank Car 70	American Car & Foundry Co., Lot #TC-3263	1947	WP&YR Passenger Car 2nd 230	Originally, underframe of Union Tank Car Co. Class X-5-300, standard gauge Tank Car #92710. Purchased by WP&YR and converted to 3-foot gauge in 1976 (#70). Tank only sold to the Alaska Department of Transportation in 1996. Underframe to Passenger Car 2nd 230 in 2002.
106	Pullman Co.	1942	WP&YR Tank Car #53	Originally, U.S. Army Flatcar #333456. Built up into gondola in 1945. Purchased by WP&YR in 1947 (#887). Renumbered to 106 in 1948. Cut back down to flatcar in 1952. Became underframe of Tank Car #53 in 1980.
110	Pullman Co.	1942	WP&YR Tank Car #10	Originally, U.S. Army Flatcar #333449. Built up into gondola in 1945. Purchased by WP&YR in 1947 (#881). Renumbered to 110 in 1948. Underframe to Tank Car #10 in 1949.
116	Pullman Co.	1942	WP&YR Tank Car #28 (now posing as Tank Car #42)	Originally, U.S. Army Flatcar #333454. Built up into gondola in 1945. Purchased by WP&YR in 1947 (#886). Renumbered to 116 in 1948. Underframe to Tank Car #28 in 1950. Tank car put on display at Yukon Transportation Museum in 1990, posing as #42 (fantasy number).
123	Colorado & Southern Ry.	1909	Reproduction C.&S. Railway Boxcar #8311	Originally, C&S boxcar. Purchased by U.S. Army in 1943. Cut down to flatcar by Chicago Freight Car Parts Co. in 1943 for use on the WP&YR (USA #334085). Built up into gondola in 1944. Sold to the WP&YR in 1947 (Gondola #773). Renumbered #123 in 1950. Cut back down to flatcar in 1952. Became Idler Car 4th #X9 (4th boom car) in 1958. Sold to Marcus Rail LLC in 1987. Rebuilt into reproduction C&S Boxcar 2nd#8311 by the Uhrich Locomotive Works in 1997. (8311 [built 1910] cannot have been the original C&S car number.) Sold to the City of Breckenridge, Colorado, in 1998. Sold to the U.S. Forest Service and moved to Boreas Pass, Colorado, in 2002.
316	American Car & Foundry Co., Lot #5233	1908	WP&YR Tank Car #27	Originally, Hart Convertible Car #316 (convertible between longitudinal hopper and gondola). Ordered from Rodger Ballast Car Co., but built by AC&F. Cut down to a flatcar in 1942 (#316). Underframe to Tank Car #27 in 1968.
476 to 478 (3 cars)	National Steel Car Corp.	1969	WP&YR Passenger Cars 2nd 200, 3rd 201, and 2nd 202 (in unknown individual correspondence)	Originally, Flatcar ##476 to 478. Became underframes of Passenger Cars 2nd 200, 3rd 201, and 2nd 202 in 1992.
491	National Steel Car Corp.	1969	WP&YR Passenger Car 2nd 209	Originally, Flatcar #491. Became underframe of Passenger Car 2nd 209 in 1993.
492	National Steel Car Corp.	1969	WP&YR Passenger Car 290	Originally, Flatcar #492. Became underframe of Passenger Car 290 in 1994.
493	National Steel Car Corp.	1969	WP&YR Passenger Car 2nd 207	Originally, Flatcar #493. Became underframe of Passenger Car 2nd 207 in 1993.
494	National Steel Car Corp.	1969	WP&YR Passenger Car 2nd 208	Originally, Flatcar #494. Became underframe of Passenger Car 2nd 208 in 1993.
495	National Steel Car Corp.	1969	WP&YR Passenger Car 2nd 203	Originally, Flatcar #495. Became underframe of Passenger Car 2nd 203 in 1992.
496	National Steel Car Corp.	1969	WP&YR Motor #5 (The Red Line)	Originally, Flatcar #496. Became underframe of Motor #5 in 1998.
497	National Steel Car Corp.	1969	WP&YR Passenger Car 2nd 204	Originally, Flatcar #497. Became underframe of Passenger Car 2nd 204 in 1993.
498	National Steel Car Corp.	1969	WP&YR Baggage Car #705	Originally, Flatcar #498. Became underframe of Passenger Car 2nd 205 in 1993. Converted to Baggage Car #705 in 2026.
499	National Steel Car Corp.	1969	WP&YR Passenger Car 2nd 206	Originally, Flatcar #499. Became underframe of Passenger Car 2nd 206 in 1993.
783	Colorado & Southern Ry.	1910	Reproduction C.&S. Ry. Boxcar #8323	Originally, C&S boxcar. Purchased by U.S. Army in 1943. Cut down to flatcar by Chicago Freight Car Parts Co. in 1943 for use on the WP&YR (USA #334117). Sold to the WP&YR in 1947 (#783). Sold to Marcus Rail LLC in 1987. Rebuilt into reproduction C&S Boxcar #8323 by the Uhrich Locomotive Works in 1996. (Unknown whether 8323 was the original C&S car number.) Sold to the City of Breckenridge, Colorado, in 1998.
1146	American Car & Foundry Co.	1942	Kauai Plantation Railway Passenger Car Waimea	Built as boxcar intended for the Ferrocarril del Estado (Argentine State Railway), but sold the U.S. Navy in 1942. Sold to the Oahu Ry. in 1959, but not used by the Oahu Ry. Sold to WP&YR and cut down to flatcar in 1962. To the K.P. Ry. and became the underframe for a passenger car in 2005.
1147	American Car & Foundry Co.	1942	Sumpter Valley R.R. Passenger Car #1147	Built as boxcar intended for the Ferrocarril del Estado (Argentine State Railway), but sold the U.S. Navy in 1942. Sold to the Oahu Ry. in 1959, but not used by the Oahu Ry. Sold to WP&YR and cut down to flatcar in 1962. To the S.V. Railroad and became the underframe for a passenger car in 1993.
1159	American Car & Foundry Co.	1942	Lahaina, Kaanapali & Pacific R.R. Passenger Car #105 (Aloha Coach)	Built as boxcar intended for the Ferrocarril del Estado (Argentine State Railway), but sold to the U.S. Navy in 1942. Sold to the Oahu Ry. in 1959, but not used by the Oahu Ry. Sold to WP&YR and cut down to flatcar in 1962. To the L.K.&P. R.R. and became the underframe for a passenger car in 1990. The L.K.&P. R.R. last operated in 2019. This car put on display at the West Maui Bike Park in Nāpili, Hawaii, in 2026.
1163	American Car & Foundry Co.	1942	Georgetown Loop Railroad Open Observation Car #1163	Built as boxcar intended for the Ferrocarril del Estado (Argentine State Railway), but sold to the U.S. Navy in 1942. Sold to the Oahu Ry. in 1959, but not used by the Oahu Ry. Sold to WP&YR and cut down to flatcar in 1962. To the Midwest Central Railroad in 1995. Resold to G.L. Railroad and became the underframe for a passenger car in 2011.
1171	American Car & Foundry Co.	1942	Lahaina, Kaanapali & Pacific R.R. Passenger Car #106 (Kaanapali Landing, until at least 2007; Mia J., by 2019)	Built as boxcar intended for the Ferrocarril del Estado (Argentine State Railway), but sold to the U.S. Navy in 1942. Sold to the Oahu Ry. in 1959, but not used by the Oahu Ry. Sold to WP&YR and cut down to flatcar in 1962. To the L.K.&P. R.R. and became the underframe for a passenger car in 1990. Renamed from Kaanapali Landing to Mia J., sometime between 2007 & 2019. The L.K.&P. R.R. last operated in 2019. This car was spotted on a semi-trailer, moving on the Kuihelani Highway toward Kahului, in September 2026. At that time, the car was expected to be restored.
1172	American Car & Foundry Co.	1942	Georgetown Loop Railroad Open Observation Car #1172	Built as boxcar intended for the Ferrocarril del Estado (Argentine State Railway), but sold to the U.S. Navy in 1942. Sold to the Oahu Ry. in 1959, but not used by the Oahu Ry. Sold to WP&YR and cut down to flatcar in 1962. To the Sumpter Valley R.R., resold to G.L. Railroad, and became the underframe for a passenger car in 2005.
1178	American Car & Foundry Co.	1942	Sumpter Valley Railway Fire Car #0178	Built as boxcar intended for the Ferrocarril del Estado (Argentine State Railway), but sold to the U.S. Navy in 1942. Sold to Kahului Railroad and cut down to flatcar in 1961. Sold to WP&YR via Midwest Steel Corp. (dealer) in 1967. Became the underframe for Tank Car #60 in 1978; unit sold to S.V. Railroad in 2005; S.V. Railroad removed #1178 from #60 tank and made #1178 the underframe for the S.V. Railroad fire car (#0178).
1179	American Car & Foundry Co.	1942	Kauai Plantation Railway Passenger Car Hanalei	Built as a boxcar intended for the Ferrocarril del Estado (Argentine State Railway), but sold to the U.S. Navy in 1942. Resold to Kahului Railroad and cut down to flatcar in 1961. Sold to WP&YR via Midwest Steel Corp. (dealer) in 1967. To the K.P. Ry. and became the underframe for a passenger car in 2005.
1184	American Car & Foundry Co.	1942	Kauai Plantation Railway Open Observation Car Wainiha	Same remarks as for #1179, above.
1185	American Car & Foundry Co.	1942	Sumpter Valley Railroad Passenger Car #1185	Built as boxcar intended for the Ferrocarril del Estado (Argentine State Railway), but sold to the U.S. Navy in 1942. Sold to Kahului Railroad and cut down to flatcar in 1961. Sold to WP&YR via Midwest Steel Corp. (dealer) in 1967. To S.V. Railroad and became the underframe for a passenger car in 1993.
1190	American Car & Foundry Co.	1942	Kauai Plantation Railway Passenger Car Wailua	Same remarks as for #1179, above.

== Existing White Pass car bodies detached from trucks ==
Car bodies with light grey have been either put on display or sold.

Number	Unit	Last Observed Location	Builder Year Built	Remarks
a. Steam Locomotive Tender Bodies:	............................	............................	............................	............................
56	Slope-Back Tender Body	Adjacent to Museum, Skagway, Alaska (2025)	WP&YR 1936	Either built or rebuilt in 1936 for use with Loco #56. Tender temporarily loaned to Loco #61 in 1938. Tender body placed as riprap along the Skagway River, at Mile Post 2.5, in 1949. Retrieved in 1990. Moved adjacent Skagway Museum about 2000. In deteriorated condition. Number no longer visible.
60	Tender Body	Adjacent to Museum, Skagway, Alaska (2025)	Baldwin Locomotive Works #17750 1900	Original #60 tender body. Tender reassigned to Loco #191 or 194 from 1944 to 1946. (The corresponding #191 or 194 tender would have been reassigned to a rotary from 1944 to 1949.) Loco #60 and this tender placed as riprap along the Skagway River, at Mile Post 2.5, in 1949. Loco and its tender body retrieved in 1990. Tender body moved adjacent Skagway Museum about 2000 – displayed upside down. In deteriorated condition. Number no longer visible.
193	Tender Body	Skagway Shops, Alaska (2025)	Baldwin Locomotive Works #69428 1943	Original #193 tender body. Received a dent in its rear, while behind Loco #193, in an April 28, 1944 wreck. Entire tender transferred to the WP&YR without its locomotive in 1946. Reassigned to Loco #73 in 1947. Tender body removed from #73 tender underframe in 2001, said removed tender body being replaced by the Rotary #2 tender body (ex-#192). No. 193 number no longer visible. See, note.
b. Boxcar Bodies Built by White Pass:	............................	............................	............................	From 112 boxcars built by White Pass between 1899 and 1906, including 13 for the Klondike Mines Ry.
506	Boxcar, without Trucks	19th Ave. and Coach Yard Alley (north car), Skagway, Alaska (2026)	WP&YR 1899	Ore unloading door installed at the bottom of the "A" end of the car in 1910. Retired in 1958. Body to local resident.
520	............................	............................	............................	See, Work Car Body BX1, below.
530	Boxcar, without Trucks	Klondike Highway Mile 2.9 (south car), Skagway, Alaska (2026)	WP&YR 1899	Retired in 1958. Body to local resident. One side of car removed in 1979. From 1979 to 2006, body rested on Bettendorf trucks as part of Broadway Station restaurant. Number no longer visible.
570	Boxcar, without Trucks	21 1/2 Alley, between State St. and Main St., Skagway, Alaska (2026)	WP&YR 1899	Retired in 1958. Body to local resident.
590	............................	............................	............................	See, Work Car Body #590, below.
602	............................	............................	............................	See, Work Car Body #602, below.
626	Boxcar, without Trucks	9 1/2 Alley, between Main St. and Alaska St. (south side, just off Alaska), Skagway, Alaska (2026)	WP&YR 1900	Retired in 1958. Body to local resident.
656	Boxcar, without Trucks	8th Ave. and Spring St., Skagway, Alaska (2026)	WP&YR 1900	Retired in 1958. Body to local resident. Number no longer visible.
670	Boxcar, without Trucks	19th Ave. and Coach Yard Alley (south car), Skagway, Alaska (2026)	WP&YR 1900	Retired in 1958. Body to local resident.
682	Boxcar, without Trucks	9 1/2 Alley, between Main St. and Alaska St. (north side, just off Main), Skagway, Alaska (2026)	WP&YR 1900	Retired in 1958. Body to local resident.
686	............................	............................	............................	See, Refrigerator Car Body #440, below.
688	Boxcar, without Trucks	Portage Lake, British Columbia, WP&YR Mile Post 30.5 (east side of track), access road at Klondike Highway Kilometer 41.1 (2026)	WP&YR 1906	Retired in 1958. Body to local resident. Painted white.
690	............................	............................	............................	See, Work Car Body X4, below.
Unknown Klondike Mines Railway # (one of 100~124, even numbers)	Boxcar Body	Just north of former Klondike Mines Railway Mile Post 18, which was about 3/4 mile south of Flannery, Yukon. Mile Post 18 was also a short distance north of the Bonanza Creek Dam, near Bonanza Creek Road Kilometer 25. (2016)	WP&YR 1905	Frame built in 1901. Expected to be used to make WP&YR car. Instead, used to make car assembled in 1905 for sale and use on the Klondike Mines Railway. Underframe detached between 1906 & 1912. Number no longer visible.
Unknown Klondike Mines Railway # (another of 100~124, even numbers)	Boxcar Body	Soda Station, Yukon, former Klondike Mines Railway Mile Post 27, Ridge Road Heritage Trail Kilometer 30; 2 1/2 kilometers north of Bonanza Creek Road Kilometer 35. (2026)	WP&YR 1905	Same remarks as for previous Klondike Mines Railway boxcar body, above.
c. Boxcar Bodies Built by Colorado & Southern Railway:	............................	............................	............................	From 50 C&S Ry. boxcars brought to White Pass by U.S. Army during World War II.
702	Boxcar, without Trucks	19 1/2 Alley, between State St. and Main St., Skagway, Alaska (2026)	Colorado & Southern Railway 1909	Originally, C&S Boxcar #8246. Purchased by U.S. Army in 1943 for use on the WP&YR (USA #232907). Transferred to the WP&YR in 1946 (#702). Retired in 1978. Body to local resident.
704	Boxcar, without Trucks	Meadows, British Columbia, WP&YR Mile Post 25.4 (2026)	Colorado & Southern Railway 1909	Originally, C&S Boxcar #8197. Purchased by U.S. Army in 1943 for use on the WP&YR (USA #232908). Transferred to the WP&YR in 1946 (#704). Retired in 1978. Number no longer visible.
712	Boxcar, without Trucks	14 1/2 Alley, between Main St. and Alaska St., Skagway, Alaska (2026)	Colorado & Southern Ry. 1909	Originally C&S Boxcar #8238. Purchased by U.S. Army in 1943 for use on the WP&YR (USA #232916). Transferred to the WP&YR in 1946 (#712). Retired in 1977. Body to local resident. Number no longer visible.
718	Boxcar, without Trucks	Hunz & Hunz Enterprises, adjacent Klondike Highway Mile 2, Skagway, Alaska (2026)	Colorado & Southern Railway 1910	Originally, C&S Boxcar #8365. Purchased by U.S. Army in 1943 for use on the WP&YR (USA #232920). Transferred to the WP&YR in 1946 (#718). Retired in 1978. Body to local resident. Number no longer visible.
730	Boxcar, without Trucks	Glacier, Alaska, WP&YR Mile Post 14.1 (2025) Moved in 2026?	Colorado & Southern Railway 1909	Originally, C&S boxcar #8257. Purchased by U.S. Army in 1943 for use on the WP&YR (USA #232933). Transferred to the WP&YR in 1946 (#730). Retired in 1978. Number no longer visible.
2nd 734	Boxcar, without Trucks	McDonald Creek, Yukon, WP&YR Mile Post 62.9 (2026)	Colorado and Southern Railway, 1910 (Boxcar ##728 and 1st 734); WP&YR, 1954 (present combination of #728 boxcar body and 1st 734 boxcar underframe)	Hybrid – consisting of #728 and boxcar body and 1st 734 boxcar underframe, so assembled in 1954. Hybrid car retired in 1978. Boxcar #728 originally C&S Boxcar #8309 (1910), purchased by U.S. Army in 1943 for use on the WP&YR (USA #232931), transferred to the WP&YR in 1946 (#728). Boxcar 1st 734 originally C&S Boxcar #8392 (1910), purchased by Army in 1943 for use on the WP&YR (USA #232937), transferred to the WP&YR in 1946 (1st 734).
746	Boxcar Body	4 1/2 Alley, between State St. and Main St., Skagway, Alaska (2026)	Colorado & Southern Ry. 1910	Originally, C&S Boxcar #8334. Purchased by U.S. Army in 1943 for use on the WP&YR (USA #232946). Transferred to the WP&YR in 1946 (#746). Underframe detached in 1960. Body to local resident. One side of car removed between 2018 & 2022. Number no longer visible.
d. Caboose Bodies:	............................	............................	............................	............................
B01	............................	............................	............................	See, Work Car Body BX1, below.
1st 905	Caboose, without Trucks	Jewell Gardens, adjacent Klondike Highway Mile 2, Skagway, Alaska (2026)	WP&YR 1899	Originally, Stock Car #703. Converted to cupola caboose in 1901, and renumbered to 2nd 901. (1st 901 was out of service from 1902 to 1906.) In 1906, 1st 901 was restored to service and 2nd 901 was renumbered to 1st 905. Trucks detached and car sold in 1952. Cupola removed by 1987. Number no longer visible. For 3rd 901 and 2nd 905, see, Existing White Pass freight train cars, above.
e. Flatcar Platforms:	............................	............................	............................	............................
483	Flatcar remains	In canyon (south car), Hawkins, Alaska, WP&YR Mile Post 17.5 (2025)	National Steel Car Corp. 1969	Carried down the side of the canyon at this location by a snow slide on April 7, 1977, about 125 ft. south of a then-existing 148-ft. long snow shed. In wrecked condition.
1015	Flatcar remains	In canyon (north car), Hawkins, Alaska, WP&YR Mile Post 17.5 (2025)	WP&YR 1956	Carried down the side of the canyon at this location by a snow slide on April 7, 1977, about 125 ft. south of a then-existing 148-ft. long snow shed. In wrecked condition. Number no longer visible.
1152	Flatcar, without Trucks	Site of the removed northeast leg, of the former East Wye, Kauai Plantation Railway, Lihue, Hawaii (2026)	American Car & Foundry Co. 1942	Built as boxcar intended for the Ferrocarril del Estado (Argentine State Railway), but sold to the U.S. Navy in 1942. Sold to the Oahu Ry. in 1959, but not used by the Oahu Ry. Sold to WP&YR and cut down to flatcar in 1962. To K.P. Ry. in 2005. Cannibalized. Number no longer visible.
f. Refrigerator Car Bodies:	............................	............................	............................	............................
406	Refrigerator Car Body	Klondike Highway Mile 2.9 (north car), Skagway, Alaska (2026)	Colorado & Southern Ry. 1910	Originally, C&S Boxcar C&S #8359. Purchased by U.S. Army in 1943 for use on the WP&YR. Converted to refrigerator car by Chicago Freight Car Parts Co. in 1943 (USA #232895). Transferred to the WP&YR in 1946. Underframe detached in 1960. Body to local resident. One side of car removed in 1979. From 1979 to 2006, body rested on substitute underframe as part of Broadway Station restaurant. Number no longer visible.
440	Refrigerator Car, without Trucks	1st Ave., between State St. and Main St., Skagway, Alaska (2025)	WP&YR 1906	Originally, Boxcar #686. Converted to refrigerator car in 1943 (#686). Renumbered to 440 in 1946. Retired in 1958. Body to local resident.
g. Tank Car Tanks:	............................	............................	............................	Now out of regulation, even as stationary tanks.
2nd 1	Tank Car Tank	Utah Yard site, former WP&YR Mile Post 105.5, access road at Alaska Highway Kilometer 1415.7 (2025)	American Car & Foundry Co., Lot #7514, tank #3961 1908	Originally, one of the three tanks on a Union Tank Car Co. Class BX, ##13450-13549 series tank car. Tank purchased by WP&YR and mounted on the former Tank Car 1st 1 underframe in 1933. The new resulting car was 2nd 1. Tank re-mounted on Flatcar #643 in 1959. Tank detached from car in 1965. Subsequently, Tank #3961 served as a gasoline fuel tank at Fraser, British Columbia. Between 1986 & 1990, tank taken out of service and relocated to Utah transfer site. Number no longer visible.
USA 14	Tank Car Tank	Near confluence of Lombard Pup and Dominion Creek, Yukon. From Hunker Creek Road Kilometer 26, go south on Dominion Creek Road about 2 kilometers, then west on side road about 1/2 kilometer (2026)	East Tennessee & Western North Carolina R.R. 1925	Originally, tank for ET&WNC Tank Car #ETX603. Car purchased by U.S. Army in 1942 for use on the WP&YR. Car unserviceable in 1947. Tank sold. Number no longer visible.
17	Tank Car Tank	Utah Yard site, former WP&YR Mile Post 105.5, access road at Alaska Highway Kilometer 1415.7 (2025)	William Graver Tank Works 1901	Before the tank’s dome was mostly cut off, the tank appeared to have been a Southern Pacific “Pease” tank. Originally on a tank car purchased by the Southern Pacific Co. in 1901 (SP #51922~52021). Tank sold to Union Oil Co. and mounted on NCNG Flatcar #183 in 1934. Car and tank purchased by WP&YR in 1942 (#17). Retired in 1952. There is a weld line around the dome, where most of the height of the dome has been removed. Number no longer visible.
h. Work Car Bodies:	............................	............................	............................	From train cars used by track workers.
BX1	Tool Car, without Trucks	Portage Lake, British Columbia, WP&YR Mile Post 30.5 (west side of track), access road at Klondike Highway Kilometer 41.1 (2026)	WP&YR 1899	Originally, WP&YR Boxcar #520. Converted to non-cupola caboose later in 1899 (#B01). Converted to a tool car in 1918. Renumbered to BX1 in 1947. Retired in 1960. Became a cabin at Portage Lake by 1969. Covered with sheet metal by 2016. Truss rod bolts visible at bottom of structure’s north and south sides. Number no longer visible.
X4	Bunk Car, without Trucks	8th Ave. and Spring St., Skagway, Alaska (2026)	WP&YR 1906	Originally, WP&YR Boxcar #690. Ore unloading door installed at the bottom of the "A" end of the car in 1910. Car converted to bunk car in 1942 (#690). Renumbered to B04, then to X4 in 1947. Retired in 1965. Number no longer visible.
590	Bunk Car, without Trucks	17 1/2 Alley, between State St. and Main St., Skagway, Alaska (2026)	WP&YR 1900	Originally, WP&YR Boxcar #590. Converted to bunk car in 1954, for use by the Wiggins Construction Co., for a track re-laying program. Retired in 1959. Body to local resident. Number no longer visible.
602	Bunk Car, without Trucks	10th Ave., between Broadway St. and Spring St., Skagway, Alaska (2026)	WP&YR 1900	Originally, WP&YR Boxcar #602. Converted to bunk car in 1954, for use by the Wiggins Construction Co., for a track re-laying program. Retired in 1957. Body to local resident. Number no longer visible.

== Former White Pass off-rail equipment on display ==
The White Pass & Yukon Route had been a multi-modal transportation company that was dominant in the region throughout most of the 20th Century. Equipment with light grey have been either put on display or sold.

Number or Name	Type Year Built	Location	Remarks
a. Boats:	........................	............................	White Pass operated river and lake boat service from 1901 to 1955.
2nd Atlin	Barge 1934	SS Klondike National Historic Site, Whitehorse, Yukon	Length = 70 ft. Volume = 69 gross tons. Built by White Pass. Canada Official No. 192401. Originally named Lake Barge and used on Atlin Lake. Moved to Tagish Lake and officially renamed to Atlin in 1951. Written off in 1957. Taken by truck to Whitehorse and put on display in 1974. Rebuilt in 2025.
Keno	Steam-Stern Wheel Boat 1922	SS Keno National Historic Site, Dawson City, Yukon	Length = 141 ft. Volume = 613 gross tons. Built by White Pass. Canada Official No. 116618. Last used by White Pass in 1950. Put on display in 1960.
2nd Klondike	Steam-Stern Wheel Boat 1937	SS Klondike National Historic Site, Whitehorse, Yukon	Length = 210 ft. Volume = 1363 gross tons. Built by White Pass. Canada Official No. 156744. Last used by White Pass in 1955. Put on display in 1966.
Loon	Gasoline-Screw Propeller Boat 1922	Mayo, Yukon	Length = 54 ft. Volume = 30 gross tons. Built by White Pass. Yukon Registration 2.J.1. Last used by White Pass in 1951. Transferred to Canadian Park Service in 1998. Transferred to Marc Johnson in 2005. Transferred to Silver Trail Tourism Assn. (Mayo) in 2006.
Neecheah	Diesel-Screw Propeller Boat 1920	Yukon Transportation Museum, Whitehorse, Yukon	Length = 79 ft. Volume = 85 gross tons. Built by White Pass. U.S.A. Official No. 220473 (1920-1922). Canada Official No. 116619 (1922-1960). Originally named Kestrel. Renamed to Neecheah in 1922. Last used by White Pass in 1951. Sold and became part of the Riverboat Café, at Alaska Highway Historic Mile 900 (Kilometer 1397), in 1958. Became The Captain Locker restaurant at Alaska Highway Historic Mile 913 (Kilometer 1419) in 1972. Put on display in 1990.
Norcom	Steam-Stern Wheel Boat Hull: 1913; above-hull structure: 1908	Hootalinqua Island, Yukon	Length = 130 ft. Volume = 352 gross tons. Hull built by Northern Navigation Co.; above hull structure built by Henry Bratnober. Used by N.N. Co. to penetrate the Dawson City-Whitehorse route. Canada Official No. 116613. Prior to 1913, the above-hull structure had been on the Evelyn (built by Bratnober in 1908). The Evelyn's hull was wrecked early in 1913. Norcom used in 1913 only. Sold to White Pass in 1914. Not used under White Pass ownership. In deteriorated condition.
Pacific Challenge (from 1979 to 1981, towed the Frank H. Brown and 3rd Klondike between Skagway and North Vancouver, under contract)	Diesel-Screw Tugboat (Steam-Screw Whaler 1952-1970) 1952	Afloat at Gerrans Bay, British Columbia (about 200 feet south of Tranquility Island) (2025)	Length = 173 ft. Volume = 547 gross tons. Built by Pusnes Mekaniske Verksted A/S (Arendal, Norway, hull #81). Japan Official No. 86903 (1961-1963). Canada Official No. 320146 (1963-2008). IMO5425841. Originally, Suderøy XVI, owned by Hvalfanger A/S-Suderøy. Sold to Anders A. Jahre (d/b/a Kosmos A/S) and renamed KOS 51 in 1959. Resold to Taiyo Gyogyo K.K. (Taiyo Fishery Co., Japan) and renamed 事 二 十 一 利 丸, Toshi Maru No. 21 [Commercial Ship No. 21] in 1961. Resold to Western Canada Whaling Co. and renamed Westwhale 7 in 1963. Resold to Pacific Towing Services, Ltd. in 1970. Resold to Knight Towing, Ltd. and renamed Pacific Challenge in 1971. Resold to Pacific Bunkering, Inc. and renamed Jacqueline W in 1986. Resold to Hi Seas Marine (Belize), Ltd. and renamed back to Pacific Challenge in 1996. Machinery removed and registry closed in 2008. Towed to Gerrans Bay in 2013. Interior damaged by fire in 2017.
2nd Sibilla	Gasoline-Screw Propeller Boat 1932	272 Tagish Ave., Carcross, Yukon	Length = 55 ft. Volume = 20 gross tons. Built by White Pass. Yukon Registration 2.J.2. Sold to George T. Simmons in 1955. Resold to Robert Cousins in the 1960s. Resold to James Fordyce in 1971. Resold to Hans and Sylvia Kutschera about 1978. Hull damaged by ice in 1978 or 1979. Resold to Janice Wotton in 1993, who moved it to 272 Tagish Ave. in 1998. Resold to Greg Kehoe in 2004. Resold to Jamie Toole in 2011 or 2012. In deteriorated condition.
Tarahne	Gasoline-Screw Propeller Boat 1917	Trainor Ave. & Lake Rd., Atlin, British Columbia	Length = 119 ft. Volume = 286 gross tons. Built by Cousins Bros. for White Pass. Canada Official No. 138539. Last used by White Pass in 1936. On display ever since.
Tutshi (remains)	Surviving components from Steam-Stern Wheel Boat: a. – Boiler (1898) b. – Engines (1889) c. – Pitman Arms and Stern Wheel Axle (1917) d. – Fuel Tanks (1913) e. – Capstan (built by 1898) f. – Winch (built by 1952)	Tutshi Memorial, Carcross, Yukon	Tutshi was Canada Official No. 138695. Built by White Pass in 1917, retired in 1955, and destroyed by fire (arson) in 1990. Length was 167 ft. Volume was 1041 gross tons. The following components survive: a. – Locomotive fire-tube boiler built by Polson Iron Works for use on the Canadian Pacific Ry. steamboat Tyrrell. Tyrrell sold to the British America Corp. in 1898; to the Dawson & White Horse Navigation Co. in 1900; to John Macauley Carson in 1904; to Frank W. Arnold in 1905; and to the WP&YR in 1906. Boiler removed from the Tyrrell and installed in the Tutshi in 1917, as built. b. – Cylinder diameters of each engine = 14 in. & 22 in. (tandem compound engines). Stroke = 72 in. Built by Detroit Engine & Dry Dock Co., shop #1117. Their use from 1889 to 1898 is unknown. Installed in the Seattle-Yukon Transportation Co. steamboat Seattle No. 3 in 1898. Seattle No. 3 sold to the Northern Navigation Co. in 1901, and to the WP&YR in 1914. Engines removed from the Seattle No. 3 and installed in the Tutshi in 1927, as replacements for smaller engines. c. – Pitman arms and stern wheel axle built for Tutshi in 1917. d. – Starboard tank capacity = 2273 gallons. Port tank capacity = 2125 gallons. Built in 1913 as a single tank by White Pass for use on its steamboat Alaska. Tank removed from the Alaska, cut approximately in half, and both halves installed in the Tutshi in 1925, when it was converted from wood- to oil-burning. e. – Capstan builder and year of build unknown. Installed on Canadian Pacific Navigation Co. steamboat Yukoner in 1898. [The C.P. Railway had no interest in the C.P. Navigation Co. at the time.] Yukoner sold to the North British American Trading & Transportation Co. in 1898; to the Trading & Exploring Co. in 1899; to the Canadian Development Co. in 1900; and to the WP&YR in 1901. Capstan removed from the Yukoner and installed on the Tutshi in 1917, as built. f. – Winch builder and year of build unknown. Installed on the Tutshi in 1952.
Woodchuck	Gasoline-Screw Propeller Boat 1939	MacBride Museum, Whitehorse, Yukon	Length = 37 ft. Volume = 8 gross tons. Built by White Pass. Last used by White Pass in 1951. Leased out in 1954. Sold to Ollie MacDonald in the 1960s. Transferred to McBride Museum in 2012.
Yukon Rose	Diesel-Screw Propeller Boat 1929	Dawson City, Yukon	Length = 61 ft. Volume = 32 gross tons. Built by Askew Boat Works. Canada Official No. 116630. Originally owned by Taylor & Drury, Ltd. Leased to White Pass and used on the Stewart River in 1936. Sold to Jack McDonald in 1943. Purchased by White Pass in 1948. Last used by White Pass in 1951. Sold to Ray Chaykowski in 1955. Resold to Charlie Garvice by 1961. Resold to Rudy Burian in 1962. Resold to Gregory H. Caple in 1977. Resold to Murray Matchett, Ron McCready, and Kevin Hewer in 1984. Resold to Marc Johnson in 2001. Vintage engine installed in 2007, but not original to this vessel. Refloated in 2009.
b. Horse-Drawn Stages:	........................	............................	White Pass operated horse-drawn stage service between Whitehorse and Dawson City from 1901 to 1921.
3	Passenger Wagon 1903	MacBride Museum, Whitehorse, Yukon	41 in. front & 54 in. rear wheels. Original Capacity = 11 Passengers & 1/2 ton of freight. Gear built by Pacific Wagon Co. (Seattle, Washington). Suspension and body built by White Pass. Middle bench seat removed, thereby reducing passenger capacity to 8. Given to the Royal Canadian Air Force in 1944. Put on display at MacBride Museum in 1953.
6	Passenger Wagon 1904	Carcross, Yukon	41 in. front & 54 in. rear wheels. Original Capacity = 11 Passengers & 1/2 ton of freight. Gear built by Pacific Wagon Co. (Seattle, Washington). Suspension and body built by White Pass. Middle bench seat removed, thereby reducing passenger capacity to 8. Sold to E. J. Spinney Trucking Service in 1944. Mr. Spinney died in 1948. Wagon put on display by 1953.
9	Passenger Wagon 1917	MacBride Museum, Whitehorse, Yukon	43 in. front & 56 in. rear wheels. Capacity = 11 Passengers & 1/2 ton of freight. Suspension and body built by White Pass. Written off in 1950. Put on display in 1953. Green paint.
16 (physically retaining #9)	Heavy Freight Wagon 1902	Yukon Transportation Museum, Whitehorse, Yukon	45 in. front & 56 in. rear wheels. Capacity = 5 tons of freight. Built by Bain Wagon Co. Originally, #9. Officially renumbered to 13 in 1905. Officially renumbered to 16 in 1909. Nevertheless, physically retained #9, possibly because it may have been taken out of service by 1905. Written off in 1950. Transferred to the Yukon Transportation Museum in 1990.
33 (physically retaining #3)	Passenger Sleigh Body (with reproduction bobs) 1901	Yukon Transportation Museum, Whitehorse, Yukon	Originally had 75 in. bobs. Capacity = 14 Passengers & 3/4 ton of freight. Original gear built by Weber Wagon Co. (Chicago, Illinois). Body built by White Pass. Originally, #3. Officially renumbered to 23 in 1905. Officially renumbered to 33 about 1909. Nevertheless, physically retained #3, possibly because it may have been taken out of service by 1905. Written off in 1950. Wheels substituted for bobs by 1973. Put on display in 1990. Re-equipped with newly made bobs between 1992 & 2013.
36 (physically retaining #26)	Passenger Sleigh Body (with replacement bobs from its era) 1901	Henry Tjoelker, Everson, Washington (2006)	Originally had 75 in. bobs. Capacity = 14 Passengers & 3/4 ton of freight. Originally gear built by Weber Wagon Co. (Chicago, Illinois). Body built by White Pass. Originally, #6. Renumbered to 26 in 1905. Officially renumbered to 36 about 1909. Nevertheless, physically retained #26, possibly because it may have been taken out of service by 1909. Written off in 1950. Body without bobs sold to George Larson in 1962. Re-sold to Mr. Tjoelker in 2001. Re-equipped with bobs from its era in 2001 or 2002.
37 (physically retaining #7)	Passenger Sleigh 1901	MacBride Museum, Whitehorse, Yukon	75 in. bobs. Capacity = 9 Passengers & 1/2 ton of freight. Gear built by Weber Wagon Co. (Chicago, Illinois). Body built by White Pass. Originally, #7. Officially renumbered to 25 in 1905. Officially renumbered to 35 about 1909. Nevertheless, physically retained #7, possibly because it had been taken out of service by 1905. Written off in 1950. Put on display in 1953.
c. Bus:	........................	............................	White Pass operated highway bus service from 1945 to 1970.
24	"Pony Cruiser" Bus 1946	Yukon Transportation Museum, Whitehorse, Yukon	Kalamazoo Coaches, Inc. shop #8034621. Capacity = 20 passengers. Wrecked in 1949. Put on display between 1990 & 1996.
d. Intermodal Containers, Non-ISO Standard:	........................	............................	White Pass operated intermodal container service from 1955 to 1993, when the MV Frank H. Brown was sold. White Pass trucking assets were sold off in 2000. Most of the containers used in the Yukon by White Pass, including the following, were not of a size approved in 1968, or later, by the International Organization for Standardization (ISO).
001	12 ft. × 8 ft. × 8 ft. Faro Mine Ore Container 1977	Yukon Transportation Museum, Whitehorse, Yukon	Capacity = 20 tons. Built by Columbia Trailer Co. (of Vancouver). Made of aluminum. Gray in color. Use discontinued in 1982, when Faro Mine first closed. Put on display between 1990 & 1992.
672	12 ft. × 8 ft. × 8 ft. Faro Mine Ore Container 1977	Yukon Transportation Museum, Whitehorse, Yukon	Capacity = 20 tons. Built by Columbia Trailer Co. (of Vancouver). Made of aluminum. Gray in color. Use discontinued in 1982, when Faro Mine first closed. Put on display between 1996 & 2010.
1012	7 ft. × 8 ft. × 8 ft. Refrigerated Intermodal Container 1955	Skagway Museum, Skagway, Alaska	Capacity = 5 tons. Built by Western Bridge & Steel Fabricators, Ltd. Gray in color. First generation container, for use with MV Clifford J. Rogers, 1955-1965. Put on display in 1988.
2142	7 ft. × 8 ft. × 8 ft. Heated Intermodal Container 1955	Skagway Museum, Skagway, Alaska	Capacity = 5 tons. Built by Western Bridge & Steel Fabricators, Ltd. Orange in color. First generation container, for use with MV Clifford J. Rogers, 1955-1965. Put on display in 1988.
2153	7 ft. × 8 ft. × 8 ft. Dry Cargo Intermodal Container 1955	Yukon Transportation Museum, Whitehorse, Yukon	Capacity = 5 tons. Built by Western Bridge & Steel Fabricators, Ltd. Originally a heated container, orange in color. Repainted green, possibly after being re-purposed away from heated service. First generation container, for use with MV Clifford J. Rogers, 1955-1965. Put on display in 1988.
3090	7 ft. × 8 ft. × 8 ft. Dry Cargo Intermodal Container 1955	Skagway Museum, Skagway, Alaska	Capacity = 5 tons. Built by Western Bridge & Steel Fabricators, Ltd. Green in color. First generation container, for use with MV Clifford J. Rogers, 1955-1965. Put on display in 1988.
3138	7 ft. × 8 ft. × 8 ft. Dry Cargo Intermodal Container 1955	Yukon Transportation Museum, Whitehorse, Yukon	Capacity = 5 tons. Built by Western Bridge & Steel Fabricators, Ltd. Green in color. First generation container, for use with MV Clifford J. Rogers, 1955-1965. Put on display in 1988.
5009	7 ft. × 8 ft. × 8 ft. Explosives Intermodal Container 1955	MacBride Museum, Whitehorse, Yukon	Capacity = 5 tons. Built by Western Bridge & Steel Fabricators, Ltd. Originally an explosives container, red in color. Repainted green, for reasons unknown. First generation container, for use with MV Clifford J. Rogers, 1955-1965. Put on display in the 1960s.
2252	25 ft. × 8 ft. × 8 ft. Heated Intermodal Container 1967	Yukon Transportation Museum, Whitehorse, Yukon	Capacity = 25 tons. Built by Canadian Trailmobile, a division of Pullman Inc. Gray in color. Second generation container. Put on display in 1988.
6457	25 ft. × 8 ft. × 8 ft. Intermodal Tank for Bulk Lube Oil 1970	Atlin Airport, British Columbia	Capacity = 5000 gallons (20 tons). Built by Columbia Trailer Co. (of Vancouver). Gray in Color. Second generation container. Located at Atlin Airport in 2012.
6551	19 ft. × 8 ft. × 8 ft. Faro Mine Coal and Quicklime Container 1969	Skagway Museum, Skagway, Alaska	Capacity = 30 tons. Built by Columbia Trailer (of Vancouver). Made of steel. Use discontinued in 1982, when Faro Mine first closed. Put on display between 2018 & 2022.
e. Container Handling Equipment:	........................	............................	White Pass operated intermodal container service from 1955 to 1993, when the MV Frank H. Brown was sold. White Pass trucking assets were sold off in 2000.
536	Clark Series 511 Van Straddle Carrier 1965	Yukon Transportation Museum, Whitehorse, Yukon	Built by Clark Equipment Co. Length = 39 ft.; Width = 13 ft.; Height = 19 ft.; Capacity = 30 tons. Used to move intermodal containers onto and off of flatcars and semi-trailers. Put on display in 2003.
53300	Semi-Trailer for Intermodal Container 1969	Yukon Transportation Museum, Whitehorse, Yukon	Built by Columbia Trailer Co. (of Vancouver). Originally #353. Designed for use with 19 ft. (30-ton capacity) ore containers. After the 19-ft. containers were replaced by 12 ft. (20-ton capacity) ore containers in 1977, this trailer was fitted with cones to engage 25 ft. × 8 ft. base, general freight containers. Trailer put on display between 1990 & 1992.
f. Shovel/Crane:	........................	............................	............................
2068	Bucyrus-Erie 15B Crawler Shovel/Crane 1948	Skagway Museum, Skagway, Alaska	Bucyrus-Erie Co. shop #60051. Retired in 1978 or 1979. Put on display between 1978 & 1997. In deteriorated condition. Number no longer visible.
g. Stationary Boiler for Aerial Tramway over Chilkoot Pass:	........................	............................	Power source for the Dyea-Klondike Transportation Co. Tramway acquired and shut down by White Pass to eliminate competition.
..................	Locomotive Fire-tube Boiler 1886	Canyon City, Alaska, Chilkoot Trail Mile 7.8 Spur	Built by Union Iron Works. Original owner unknown. Sold to Dyea-Klondike Transportation Co. in 1898, for use in generating electricity to power its aerial tramway over Chilkoot Pass. D-K-T Co. ownership of the boiler was subject to a lien personally retained by George C. Teal, creditor and trustee of the company. The D-K-T Co. sold out to White Pass in June 1899, with Mr. Teal retaining his personal lien on the boiler. White Pass took over operation of the aerial tramway and shut it down in July 1899. Because of the lien on the boiler, the White Pass did not remove it. Mr. Teal did not foreclose and remove the boiler, either. Remains of the boiler.

== Origins of White Pass station, passenger car, and preserved boat names ==
Aishihik [Cars ##264, 380] is the English adaptation of the Tlingit áa shá yík, which means in the head of the lake. Aishihik Lake located 28 kilometers north of Alaska Highway Kilometer 1546, via Aishihik Lake Road. Aishihik River located at Alaska Highway Kilometer 1547.5.

Alaska [Mile Post 0 to 20.4] is the English adaptation of the Aleut idiom alaxsx-a, which figuratively refers to mainland Alaska. Literally, it means object to which the action of the sea is directed (alax [sea] + sx-a [object of action]).

Alsek [Car #314] is the English adaptation of the Tlingit verb theme aa łsêxh, which means a person habitually rests. It was the name of a Nóogaa (Tlingit) village located on the pre-1891 Upper Alsek River (post-1891 Tatshenshini River), near the mouth of the O'Connor River. Alsek River flows into the Gulf of Alaska.

American Shed [MP 19.2 Station] was named for a snow shed on the American side of White Pass, which existed until the 1980s. This name distinguished this shed from a snow shed on the Canadian side of White Pass.

Annie Lake [Car #360] was named for Annie Austin (1870–1950), widow of Charles "Dawson Charlie" Henderson (co-discoverer of gold in the Klondike). Lake located 19 kilometers southwest of Robinson, via Annie Lake Road.

Atlin [Car #218 and a Barge] is the English adaptation of the Tlingit phrase áa tlein, which means big lake. Atlin Lake located 96 kilometers south of Alaska Highway Kilometer 1342, via Atlin Road.

Bare Loon Lake [Car 2nd 202] was named for skinny dipping and wailing loons. 1970s Chilkoot Trail hikers sometimes skinny dipped and sometimes heard loons wail at this lake. This lake provided those hikers their last opportunity to bathe before boarding the train at Bennett. Un-officially named "Beaver Lake." This lake is at Chilkoot Trail Kilometer 46.7 and to the west of WP&YR Mile Post 37.

Barry [Mile Post 36.0 Station] was named for Donald E. Barry (1944-2000), WP&YR conductor, killed in a freak railroad accident. Station renamed to Vista in 2007 or 2008.

"Beaver Lake" [Car #388] is the un-official name for Bare Loon Lake, which is at Chilkoot Trail Kilometer 46.7 and to the west of WP&YR Mile Post 37. There are at least 14 other "Beaver Lake"s in British Columbia.

Bennett [Mile Post 40.6 Station] and Bennett Lake [Car #240] were named for James Gordon Bennett, Jr. (1841–1918), son of the founder of the New York Herald. The lake was originally one of at least four lakes which had borne the Tlingit name kusawa [narrow lake]. Bennett also located at Chilkoot Trail Kilometer 53.1.

Bernard Lake [Car 2nd 209] was named for James Bernard "Ben" Moore (1865-1919), who helped establish the White Pass Trail. Un-officially named "Fraser Lake." Lake located at Mile Post 27.7 and at Klondike Highway Kilometer 36.5, adjacent to the Fraser station.

Big Kalzas Lake [Car 2nd 230] was named for Kalzas (fl. 1859), a Northern Tutchone employee of the Hudson's Bay Co.

Big Salmon Lake [Cars ##276, 352] was named for the Big Salmon River, which flows through the lake. Big Salmon River took its name from its Tagish, Tlingit, and Northern Tutchone names, which translate to water in which there is large chinook (king) salmon. Big Salmon Lake is 9 kilometers downstream from the river’s headwaters at Quiet Lake. Quiet Lake is at South Canol Road Kilometer 98.5.

Black Cross Rock [Mile Post 10.4 Station] is a large fallen rock with grave marker, which commemorates two construction workers who were accidentally crushed and buried by this rock on August 10, 1898. This accident occurred during blasting operations. One of the workers was Maurice Dunn (1861-1898), who had lived in Michigan and California. The other worker is "supposed to be", "A. Jeneaux," but there is little or no corroboration for that latter name.

Black Lake [Car #216] was named for the lake's dark appearance, which is caused by the presence of tannic acid and by the lake's not being fed by glacial runoff. Lake located on the Klondike Highway between Mile 4 and Mile 5.

Boulder [Mile Post 5.0 Station] was named for boulders located in the Skagway River at this location.

British Columbia [MP 20.4 to MP 52.6] was indirectly named for Christopher Columbus (1451-1506), by way of five iterations. Christopher Columbus was the eponym for the name Columbia, a reference to the New World. Columbia was the eponym for the Columbia Rediviva [Columbia Revived], a privately owned ship built as Columbia in 1773, and rebuilt in 1787 [thereby, “Revived”]. The Columbia Rediviva was the eponym for the Columbia River, into which that ship entered in 1792. The Columbia River was the eponym for the Columbia District, a fur trading district named in 1810. Finally, the Columbia District was the eponym for British Columbia, which was the portion of the Columbia District that lay in Canada and was named in 1858.

Canyon [former Mile Post 106.0 Station] is named for Miles Canyon, to which it is adjacent. Miles canyon is named for Lt. Gen. Nelson A. Miles, who sent 1Lt. Frederick G. Schwatka on his journey along the Yukon River in 1883.

Carcross [Mile Post 67.5 Station] was shortened from Caribou Crossing to Carcross in 1904, because of frequent confusion in mail services. Named Caribou Crossing from 1900 to 1904. Prior to 1900, the name Caribou Crossing had applied to where most caribou actually crossed – the narrows at Ten Mile Point, which is located three miles east of present-day Carcross, and which divides Nares Lake from Tagish Lake. The Tagish name for these narrows was Médzíh É’oł [Caribou are Swimming], and the Tlingit name for these narrows was Watsíx Naakwaaní Yé [Caribou Swimming Route]. The name Caribou Crossing was moved from Ten Mile Point to present-day Carcross in 1900, when the railroad arrived and appropriated the name. Prior to 1900, present-day Carcross had been Upper Caribou Crossing. The Tagish name for Upper Caribou Crossing (present-day Carcross) had been Todezáané [Sand Always Blowing]. The Tlingit name for Upper Caribou Crossing had been Naadaashaa Héeni [Stream Flowing from the Mountain]. Carcross also located at Klondike Highway Kilometer 105.6.

Carr-Glynn [former Copper Branch station, 5.2 rail miles from MacRae] was named for Sir Sidney Carr Glynn (1835-1916), first chairman of the WP&YR. Site located at the south end of Carr-Glynn Lake, 12 kilometers south of Alaska Highway Kilometer 1428.3: three kilometers via Fish Lake Road, plus 9 kilometers via Copper Haul Road.

Chilkat [Car 2nd 205] is the English adaptation of a Tlingit name of unknown origin. Circumstantial evidence suggests that it was an abbreviation (or remnant) of a clause which means river that brings the storehouse(s) sockeye salmon. In 1882, the Chilkat River’s name was recorded as "Tschilkat-hīn," or Chíl [storehouse] Gaat [sockeye salmon] Héen [river]. Standing alone, Chíl Gaat Héen is not even a complete phrase, because it contains only three alienable nouns that are not grammatically linked. In addition, Chíl Gaat Héen does not appear to be an Eyak loanword, because the Eyak language was too far away, because héen is not an Eyak word, and because chíl was probably inherited from the ancestor language, common to both Tlingit and Eyak, instead of having been loaned from one offspring to the other. In fact, chíl gaat héen looks like a clause that is missing the verb. The three nouns, chíl gaat héen, are in the correct sequence, so that if the adverb yaa and the verb na-ø-tee-n [brings] were added at the end, then the resulting clause would accurately describe the Chilkat River. Chíl-de gaat héen yaa na-tee-n means river that brings the storehouse(s) sockeye salmon – which in fact describes the Chilkat River. (The constituent word order of a Tlingit clause is: indirect object equivalent, then direct object, then subject, followed by the verb.) In addition, the meaning of this clause would also explain why “Chilkat” had not been the Tlingit name for Chilkat Lake. Chilkat Lake’s Tlingit name had been Áa Ká [On the Lake]. The name Chilkat was officially assigned to the lake in 1880 by the U.S. Navy. Chilkat River extends sinuously between Haines Highway Miles 4.3 and 23.8. Chilkat Lake located six miles south of Haines Highway Mile 26.2, four miles via the Chilkat Lake Road, and two miles via shallow rivers (on jetboat or snowmobile).

Chilkoot [Car 2nd 204] is the English adaptation of the Tlingit phrase chíl-góot, which means without a storehouse. This name was a reference to the Chilkoot Indians' having stored fish packed in snow between alder or willow branches, instead of in storehouses. Chilkoot Lake located 10 miles north of Haines: 9 miles via Lutak Road and 1 mile via Chilkoot Lake Road.

Chilkoot Trail is a partial translation of the trail’s Tlingit name, namely Chilkoot Dei-yi \dā•yee\, which means Chilkoot-owned Trail. The trail’s English name omits the reference to ownership. The trail extends 33.0 miles/53.1 kilometers, from Dyea Road Mile 7.2 to Bennett Station. The second word of Chilkoot Dei-yi sounds like the Tlingit pronunciation of the name of Dyea village. The English adaptation of the village name is \dī•yee\ – however, Tlingit did not have the English long ī sound. Prior publications state that the name Dyea is the English adaptation of the words for “to pack” [yaa] or “carrying place” [yaa yé]. But, the presence of the initial \d\ sound in Dyea casts doubt on those latter possibilities, and suggests that the first syllable was in fact dei (as in dei-yi). Use of the name Dyea for its present location first occurred in 1886, when John J. Healy (1840-1908) and Edgar Wilson (1842-1895) opened a trading post there. This structure burned down in 1920. Its site, about 0.6 mile south of the Taiya River bridge, is now near a campground parking lot. (Note the distinction between the Tlingit possessed noun Dei-yi [Owned Trail], and the Tlingit phrase Dei Yé [Way to the Trail]. This distinction is reflected in the difference between the English names Dyea and Taiya (inlet name, river name). See, Taiya, below.)

Choutla [Car #366] was the English adaptation of the Southern Tutchone idiom chu dläw, which figuratively refers to the waterfalls that feed Choutla Lake. Literally, it means laughing water. This name was coined in 1911 by Bishop Isaac O Stringer as the name for a nearby school. Choutla Lake located six kilometers east of Klondike Highway Kilometer 65.7, via Tagish Road.

Clifton [Mile Post 8.5 Station] was named for the rock ledge overhanging the tracks at this location.

Combo [Car #211] is an abbreviation for combined passenger and baggage car.

Copper River [Car #304] was named for abundant copper deposits along the upper river. River flows along portions of the Glenn Highway, Richardson Highway, Edgerton Highway, and Copper River Highway.

Cougar Lake [Car #506] was the name of Cowley Lake until sometime between 1941 & 1947. Lake located at former Mile Post 94.7.

Cowley [former Mile Post 95.1 Station] and Cowley Lake [Car #234] were named for Isaac Cowley Lambert (1850–1909), chairman of the construction company which built the WP&YR railroad. Lake named Cougar Lake until sometime between 1941 & 1947. Cowley Station access road at Klondike Highway kilometer 148.1. Cowley Lake located at former Mile Post 94.7.

Crag Lake [Car #362] was named for the crag which overlooks the lake. Lake located 13 kilometers east of Klondike Highway Kilometer 65.7, via Tagish Road.

Crater Lake [Car 3rd 201] was named for the lake's crater-like appearance. Lake extends between Chilkoot Trail Kilometers 26 and 28.

De Wette [former Mile Post 84.0 Station] was named for Auguste C. R. de Wette (1845-1912), banker and early shareholder of the WP&YR. Station had been named Wette Lea until 1901.

Dease Lake [Cars ##280, 503] was named for Peter Warren Dease (1788–1863), chief factor of the Hudson's Bay Co. Lake located 226 kilometers south of Alaska Highway Kilometer 1002, via Cassiar Highway.

Denver [Mile Post 5.9 Station] was named in 1904 for the four-mile distant Denver Glacier. Until that year, the station had been named Viaduct. The Denver Glacier had been named in 1899 or 1900 for Denver, Colorado, by two former Denver residents, WP&YR civil engineer Alfred Williams and company photographer Harry C. Barley.

Dewey Lake [Car #220] most likely named for Adm. George Dewey (1837–1917), U.S. Navy. Lake located 1/2 mile east of Skagway, via steep hiking trail.

Dezadeash [Car #254] is the English adaptation of the Tlingit phrase dáas’aa kayáash, which means snare platforms (for fishing). Dezadeash Lake extends between Haines Highway kilometers 193 and 210.

Divide [Mile Post 21.1 Station] is the loop track switch, just north of White Pass. May have been named for the drainage divide between the Skagway River and Yukon River drainage basins, the actual divide being about a mile south of this point.

Drury Lake [Car #336] was named for William S. Drury (1870–1953) of Taylor & Drury, Yukon merchants.

Dugdale [former Mile Post 99.9 Station] was named for James Dugdale (1842-1903), an early White Pass shareholder. Dugdale not to be confused with Dundalk, below.

Dundalk [Mile Post 56.3 Station] most likely named by Michael J. Heney for the port city 57 miles east of Killeshandra, Ireland. Heney's parents had emigrated from Killeshandra to Canada in 1854, probably via Dundalk. The parents were Thomas Heney (1832-1892) and Mary Ann (McCourt) Heney (1834-1911). Dundalk not to be confused with Dugdale, above.

Ear Lake [former Mile Post 107.2 Station] was named for the shape of the adjacent lake.

Emerald Lake [Cars ##244, 254, 501, 510] was named for the blue and green light from the surrounding trees that is reflected by the lake's marl bed. Lake located at Klondike Highway kilometer 117.6.

Fairweather Lake [Cars ##278, 356] most likely named for the lake at Cape Fairweather, one mile from the Gulf of Alaska and at the foot of Fairweather Glacier. The Cape had been named Fairweather by Capt. James Cook for the good weather he had encountered there in 1778. The glacier and lake subsequently took their names from the cape. (There is a less likely Fairweather Lake at a remote location in eastern Yukon.)

Fantail Lake [Car 2nd 203] was named for the fantail hitch, which is a dogsled hitch in which there is a separate tug line connecting each dog to the sled. The dogs are thereby fanned out in front of the sled. Also known as a fan hitch. The fantail hitch is less common than the gangline (or tandem) hitch, in which a common tug line runs between two tandems of dogs, and each dog is connected to that common tug line. The ice on Fantail Lake constituted part of the Fantail Trail, the winter dogsled trail that extended between Log Cabin and Atlin, British Columbia. The lake extends from 20 to 29 miles east of Log Cabin, via the trail.

Finlayson Lake [Car #340] was named for Duncan Finlayson (1796–1862), chief factor of the Hudson's Bay Co. Lake located 231 kilometers north of Alaska Highway Kilometer 980, via Campbell Highway.

Fortymile River [Car #322] was so named because it joins the Yukon River 40 miles below (west-northwest of) Old Fort Reliance. Fortymile River located 48 kilometers north of Top of the World Highway Kilometer 59.2, via Clinton Creek Road.

Fox Lake [Car #390] is presumably named for the red fox, which is found throughout the Yukon. Lake received the name Fox by 1940, when a landing field was built near the lake's location, but before a highway was there. The lake's previous Southern Tutchone name had been Kwätan'aya Mân [Going-Into-the-Bush Lake]. The lake now extends between Klondike Highway kilometers 238 and 248.

Foy [Mile Post 11.4 Station] was named for Hugh Foy (1842-1899), White Pass Superintendent of Construction.

Frances Lake [Car #364] was named for Lady Frances Simpson (1812–1853), wife of Hudson's Bay Co. governor, George Simpson. Lake located 171 kilometers north of Alaska Highway Kilometer 980, via Campbell Highway.

Fraser [Mile Post 27.7 Station] was named for Duncan C. Fraser (1845-1910), a Member of Parliament from Nova Scotia. Fraser also located at Klondike Highway kilometer 36.5.

"Fraser Lake" [Cars 1st 200, #226] is the unofficial name for Bernard Lake. Lake located at Mile Post 27.7 and at Klondike Highway kilometer 36.5, adjacent to the Fraser station. A larger lake in British Columbia is officially named Fraser Lake.

Gateway [Mile Post 23.5 Station] was probably named for the WP&YR slogan "Gateway to the Yukon," and for the fact that this location has the highest elevation on entire White Pass railroad, at 2940 feet.

Glacier [Mile Post 14.1 Station] was named for groundwater seepage and freezing at this location. In the early 1900s, this phenomenon was also referred to as a glacier.

Goat Lake [Car #386] is named for the high concentration of mountain goats in the area. Lake is 1921 feet above, and supplies the water for, Pitchfork Falls at Mile Post 9.5.

Gravel Pit [Mile Post 55.6 Station] was named for an adjacent gravel pit.

Graves [Mile Post 49.3 Station] and Samuel H. Graves [Car #402] were named for Samuel H. Graves (1852-1911), the first president of WP&YR. In 1885, Graves had become an associate of Close Brothers, the firm that later financed the WP&YR. Graves station renamed to Scheffler in 2014.

Guardrail Curve [Mile Post 43.6 Station] was named for the 24° curve, sharpest on the railroad, which until the 1970s, had a third, safety rail – a.k.a., a guardrail.

Gulch [Mile Post 18.3 Station] was named for the confluence of Dead Horse Gulch and Switchback Gulch. See, Skagway River Branches, below.

Hannan [former Mile Post 17.6 Snow Shed] was named for Kenneth B. Hannan (1889-1976), White Pass General Manager in 1949, when the snow shed was erected. Shed removed in 1992. Site renamed to Hawkins in 2019.

Hawkins [Mile Post 17.6 Station] was named for Erastus C. Hawkins (1860-1912), chief engineer for construction of the White Pass railway. The two flatcars near the bottom of the hillside at this location are former WP&YR ##483 and 1015, carried down in a 1977 snowslide. Site named Hannan until 2019.

Heney [former Mile Post 12.3 Station] and Michael J. Heney [Car #401] were named for Michael J. Heney (1864-1910), the labor contractor who built the WP&YR railroad. Heney station was eliminated in 2019.

Homan Lake [Car 2nd 208] was named for Charles A. Homan (1847–1918), U.S. Army topographer who accompanied 1Lt. Frederick G. Schwatka along the Yukon River in 1883.

Hutshi [Car #358] is the English adaptation of the Tlingit phrase hóoch’ áayi, which means last lake. Hutshi Lake was so named because it was the northern-most lake on three Chilkat trade routes, the Neskatahin Trail [Neskatahin Dei-yi], the Silver Lake Trail [Dáanáak’w Dei-yi], and the Big Glacier Trail [Sít’ Li-gei Dei-yi]. Hutshi Lake located 48 kilometers north of Champagne (Alaska Highway Kilometer 1513), via the Neskatahin Trail.

Inspiration Point [Mile Post 16.9 Station] was named for the vista seen from this location.

Jennings Lake [Car #374] was named for William T. Jennings (1846–1906), civil engineer who assessed various railroad and road routes to the Yukon.

Johns Lake [Car #332] was named for Johnnie Johns (1898-1988), Carcross-based outfitter and guide.

Kathleen Lake [Car #270] was named for a girl in Berwickshire County, Scotland, left behind by William "Scotty" Hume (1868–1952), a North-West Mounted Police constable (Reg. #2259) stationed on the Dalton Trail from 1898 to 1903. Lake located 2/3 kilometer west of Haines Highway Kilometer 219.7, via Kathleen Lake Turnoff.

Keno [Steam-Stern Wheel Boat] was ultimately derived from a French term which means five winning numbers; a game of chance. The boat was immediately named for the Keno (silver) claim, staked in 1919 by Alfred Kirk Schellinger. Keno claim located 110 kilometers east of Klondike Highway Kilometer 535, via Silver Trail.

Klehini [likely candidate for a car name] is the English adaptation of the Tlingit phrase l’éiw héeni, which means gravel river. Gravel is abundant in the Klehini River and Valley. Furthermore, the water in the Klehini is clear enough, so as to eliminate l’éiw from meaning sand or silt. River extends sinuously between Haines Highway Mile 23.8 and Kilometer 87 (corresponding to Mile 50).

Klondike [Car #308 and Steam-Stern Wheel Boat] is the English adaptation of the Hän idiom Tr'o Ndek, which figuratively means Hammer River. Literally, it means Chinook (King) Salmon River. The reason for the figurative meaning is that hammers had been used to erect fishing weirs in the Klondike River, in order to catch the Chinook salmon. Klondike River extends sinuously between Klondike Highway kilometers 664 and 715.

Kluahne [Car #504] was an early spelling of Kluane.

Kluane [Car #258] is the English adaptation of the hybrid phrase lhù aani, which means whitefish place. It was derived from the Southern Tutchone word for whitefish, plus the Tlingit word for place in which there are. Kluane Lake extends between Alaska Highway kilometers 1642 and 1701.

Klukshu [Cars ##282, 348] is the English adaptation of the Tlingit phrase l’ook shù, which means end of coho salmon. Klukshu Lake located 2/3 kilometer east of Haines Highway Kilometer 183.2, via Klukshu Turnoff.

Kusawa [Car #286] is a contraction of the Tlingit phrase ká-woo-sáa-oo áa, which means narrow lake. Because retreating glaciers often leave long and narrow lakes, there are at least four lakes which had borne this Tlingit name, including Kusawa Lake, Yukon, for which the coach is named. Kusawa Lake, Yukon, located 24 kilometers south of Alaska Highway kilometer 1489.1, via Kusawa Lake Road.

LaBerge Lake [Car #256] was named for Michael Laberge (1837-1909), a Yukon River explorer who never actually saw the lake named for him. Lake located 3 kilometers east of Klondike Highway Kilometer 225, via Deep Creek Road.

Lansdowne [former Mile Post 74.9 Station] was named for Henry C. K. P. Fitz-Maurice, 5th Marquess of Lansdowne (1845-1927), Governor-General of Canada, 1883-1888.

Laughton Glacier Moraine [2 miles southeast of Mile Post 14.5] can be seen in the distance between Mile Posts 14.5 and 14.8, looking southeast. It appears as a gray area against green surroundings. The glacier had extended onto this moraine before the railroad was built, but was no longer visible from the right of way by 1898. The glacier had been named for Maj. Gen. Henry W. Lawton (1843-1899), who was killed in the Philippine–American War.

"LeBarge Lake" [Car #256] is a misspelling of Laberge Lake.

"Lewes Lake" [Car #268] misspells the surname of Alfred B. Lewis (1866-1928), chief locating engineer of the WP&YR, for whom the lake was named. Lake located at former Mile Post 83.

Liard [Car #316] is the French word for eastern cottonwood. Liard River extends sinuously between Alaska Highway kilometers 761 and 991.

Lindeman Lake [Car #222] was named for Dr. Moritz K. A. Lindeman (1823–1908), secretary to the Bremen Geographical Society. Lake extends between Chilkoot Trail kilometers 41 and 52.

Log Cabin [Mile Post 33.0 Station] was named for a structure which had been erected by the Tagish Indians. The name "Log Cabin," and an actual log cabin, predated any Canadian government structure at this location.

Lorne [former Mile Post 79.4 Station] was named for John D. S. Campbell, Marquess of Lorne (1845-1914), Governor-General of Canada, 1878-1883.

Lynx Lake [Car #501] is a fantasy name. Canada lynxes are the most important furbearing animal in the Yukon; however, there is no “Lynx Lake” in the Yukon or within 800 miles of Skagway.

Mackenzie River [Car #310] was named for Sir Alexander Mackenzie (1764–1820), Arctic explorer. River located 607 kilometers north of Klondike Highway Kilometer 675, via Dempster Highway.

MacRae [former Mile Post 104.0 Station] was named for Charles Colin MacRae (1843-1922), an early White Pass shareholder. MacRae also located at Alaska Highway kilometer 1413.1.

Marsh Lake [Car #224] was named for Prof. Othniel C. Marsh (1831–1899), of Yale University. The Tagish name for Marsh Lake had been Taa-gish Áayi [lake consisting of breakup water]. Lake extends between Alaska Highway kilometers 1367 and 1379.

Mayo Lake [Car #236] was named for Alfred H. Mayo (1846–1923), a Yukon trader. Lake located 95 kilometers east of Klondike Highway Kilometer 535, via Silver Trail.

McClintock Lake [Cars ##288, 350] was named for Adm. Sir Francis L. McClintock (1819–1907), an Arctic explorer.

McConnell Lake [Car #372] was named for Charles McConnell (1871–1946), postmaster at Robinson. Lake located 3 kilometers west of Robinson, via Annie Lake Road.

McDonald Creek [Mile Post 62.9 Station] had been named for a person who allegedly staked a claim at this location in 1899. Twenty-one subsequent claims were filed for this same creek in the same year. No gold was found here. Apparently, a hoax.

McNeil Lake [Car #342] is named for the McNeil River, which flows through the lake. McNeil River was named in 1951. Circumstantial evidence suggests that the river was named for James H. McNeil (1871-1951), Yukon Superintendent of Public Roads and Buildings, 1917-1945. He had been the most prominent Yukon official associated with construction of the Alaska Highway. In 1940, he was appointed to the U.S.-Canada Permanent Joint Board on Defense, relating to the then-proposed Alaska Highway. The river's previous Tlingit name had been Kéidladi Héeni [Seagull River]. The head of the McNeil River is 12 miles upstream from the lake, and is technically the "source" of the Yukon River. The source of a river is the most distant point upstream from the mouth of the river, regardless of assigned name.

McQuesten Lake [Car #338] was named for LeRoy N. "Jack" McQuesten (1836–1909), Yukon trader. Lake located 15 kilometers north of Silver Trail Kilometer 63, via a side road.

Meadows [Mile Post 25.4 Station] was named for the meadows along the Tutshi River (a.k.a. "Thompson River") at this location. Presumably, the 1899 stable at the south (uphill) end of the Thompson River meadows was so located so that horses could feed on the grass of these meadows.

Minto [former Mile Post 81.6 Station] was named for Gilbert J. Elliott-Murray-Kynynmound, 4th Earl of Minto (1845-1914), Governor-General of Canada, 1898-1904.

Moose Lake [Car #504] is an alternate, and perhaps mistaken, name used in 1899, for Moon Lake, British Columbia (near Tutshi Lake).

Morrow Lake [Car 2nd 207] was named for William Richard Morrow (1915–1968), Yukon corrections director, who proposed that convicts maintain the Chilkoot Trail. Lake located at Chilkoot Trail kilometer 30.7.

Muncho [Car #252] is the English adaptation of the Kaska phrase men cho, which means big lake. Muncho Lake extends between Alaska Highway kilometers 698.5 and 710.

Munroe Lake [Car #344] was named for Alexander Munro (1857-1909), boundary survey axe man who broke his leg near this lake in 1901.

Nakina [Car #382] is the English adaptation of the Tlingit village name Naak'i Naa .áa, which means People Sitting Upstream.

Nares Lake [Car 2nd 206] was named for Adm. Sir George S. Nares (1831–1915), an Arctic explorer. Lake located at Klondike Highway kilometer 105.2

Neecheah [Diesel-Screw Propeller Boat] – circumstantial evidence suggests that this name is the English adaptation of the Tlingit phrase neech yeil’, which means calm shoreline. This name is a Tlingit language description of the Yukon River just downstream of Whitehorse Rapids, which would have been correct, but does not pre-date 1900. Prior to October 1899, Whitehorse itself had not existed, and there had been no reason for the Indians to give its future location a name. Neecheah [Neech Yeil’] appears to be a short Tlingit language description of Whitehorse that was created in 1922 to name the boat.

Neskatahin [likely candidate for a car name] – circumstantial evidence suggests that this name is a contraction of the Tlingit phrase Nás’k Áa Tayee Héen, which means River Below Three Lakes. This name refers to a village once located at a bend in the present-day Tatshenshini River, which is about 500 feet below, and about 3 1/2 miles from, three nearby lakes – now known as Pringle Lake, Stella Lake, and Neskatahin Lake. These three lakes lie on plateaus which overlook the river bend. Neskatahin was also 114 miles from Haines, via the Neskatahin Trail [Neskatahin Dei-yi].

Nisutlin [Car #272] was a loanword used by the Tagish Indians. Its origin had been neither Tagish nor Tlingit. (The original Tlingit name for the Nisutlin River had been Héen Tlein [Big River].) Circumstantial evidence suggest that Nisutlin was borrowed from a Southern Tutchone phrase which means strong flow. Nisutlin Bay located at Alaska Highway kilometer 1243.

Norcom [Steam-Stern Wheel Boat] was named for the Northern Commercial Co., an affiliate of the Northern Navigation Co.

"Norse River" [Car #306] was a misspelling of Nourse River, which had been named for Prof. Joseph E. Nourse (1819-1889), U.S. Navy. River mouth located at Chilkoot Trail Mile 7.2.

Octopus Lake [Car #507] is a metaphoric name, which refers to the lake’s "many arms." Circumstantial evidence suggests that it is a translation of the corresponding Tlingit metaphoric name. Octopus Lake is just east of Summit Lake at White Pass. Its surface elevation is 15 feet above Summit Lake's. Octopus Lake extends between Mile Post 21.2 (Divide) and Mile Post 22.5.

Partridge Lake [Car #505] was named for Otto H. “Swampy” Partridge (1855-1930), who constructed three small steamboats near this lake in 1898 (Flora, Ora, and Nora).

Pavey [Mile Post 46.4 Station] was named for Francis Pavy (1837-1902), an early investor in the WP&YR.

Peace River [Car #330] was named for the peace treaty made in 1781 along the shores of this river, near its mouth (near Peace Point, Alberta). This treaty settled a territorial war between the Cree and Dane-zaa (Beaver) Indians. River located at Alaska Highway kilometer 55.4.

Peel River [Car #326] was named for Sir Robert Peel (1788–1850), prime minister of Great Britain. River located 539 kilometers north of Klondike Highway Kilometer 675, via Dempster Highway.

Pelly Lake [Car #346] was named for Sir John H. Pelly (1777–1852), governor of the Hudson's Bay Co.

Pelly River [Car #320] was named for Sir John H. Pelly (1777–1852), governor of the Hudson's Bay Co. River located at Klondike Highway kilometer 463.6.

Pennington [Mile Post 51.6 Station] was named for Frederick Pennington (1819-1914), an early shareholder of the WP&YR.

Pit [Mile Post 55.6 Station]. See, Gravel Pit, above.

Porcupine River [Car #324] is presumably named for the North American porcupine, which is found in the region. River received the name Porcupine by 1898. River located at Klondike Highway Mile 6, and across the Skagway River from WP&YR Mile Post 7.3.

"Portage Lake" [Car #267] is the un-official name for the lake at WP&YR Mile Post 30.5, just north (downstream) of Shallow Lake and just south (uphill) of Maud Lake. Originally, Áak'u Sáani (Little Lakes in Tlingit). Then, un-officially "Shallow Lake," until 1899, when Shallow became the official name for the lake just to the south (upstream). Lake also located at Klondike Highway kilometer 41.1.

Primrose Lake [Car #274] was named for Supt. Philip C. H. Primrose (1864–1937), North-West Mounted Police (Reg. #O.56).

Ptarmigan Point [Mile Post 29.9 Station] was named for the Alaska state bird. (Or, co-state bird, if you count the mosquito. 😁) Ptarmigan is the English adaptation of the Scottish Gaelic tārmachan. The "p" was added in 1684 to make the word appear to be Greek!! 😁 😁

Pueblo [former Copper Branch terminal, 11.0 rail miles from MacRae] was so named by Hibbard E. Porter (1860-1916), who staked a copper claim at this site in 1899. Site located at intersection of Fish Lake Road and Copper Haul Road, 3 kilometers southwest of Alaska Highway kilometer 1428.3, via Fish Lake Road.

Racine Lake [Car #384] was named for Cariste Racine (1851-1926), owner of a sawmill on Tagish Lake, and owner of the White Pass Hotel in Whitehorse.

Rapid Spur [former Mile Post 109.0 Station] was named for the adjacent White Horse Rapids. On March 27, 1900, ten weeks before the railroad reached this point, Mr. Cornelius Curtin (1855-1900) had died of pneumonia at White Horse Rapids. His attending physician had been Dr. Leonard S. E. Sugden. Dr. Sugden then transported Mr. Curtin's body to Tagish, where he cremated it in the firebox of the steamer Olive May. Dr. Sugden's subsequent recount of this peculiar event to Robert W. Service, inspired Mr. Service to write the fanciful poem The Cremation of Sam McGee.

Red Line [Car #5] was named for the stage and boat line which operated between White Pass, British Columbia, and Carcross, Yukon, from 1898 to 1901.

Robinson [former Mile Post 88.9 Station] was named for William C. "Stikine Bill" Robinson (1857-1926), general foreman of construction of the White Pass railroad. Robinson also located at Klondike Highway kilometer 139.6.

Rocky Point [Mile Post 6.9 Station] was named for the large rock outcropping at this location, through which the railroad cut had been made.

Scheffler [Mile Post 49.3 Station] was named for Willi Scheffler (1940 or 1941-2025), White Pass Roadmaster, 1980-2025. Station was named Graves until 2014.

Schwatka Lake [Car #266] was named for 1Lt. Frederick G. Schwatka (1849–1892), 3rd U.S. Cavalry, Yukon explorer. In 1876, Lt. Schwatka had led the initial cavalry charge at the Battle of Slim Buttes. He was also a doctor, and was the first to write about the low-carb diet. Schwatka Lake was created by a dam in 1958 and is located at former Mile Post 107.7.

Scotia Bay [former Taku Tram Mile 2.2 Station] was probably named in 1898 for Nova Scotia, by prospector Kenneth C. McLaren (1867-1931), who had come from Nova Scotia.

Sibilla [Gasoline-Screw Propeller Boat] had been the name of the yacht on which the financier of the White Pass, namely William B. Close, spent much of his youth.

Skagway [Mile Post 0.0 Station] and Skagway River [Car #300] are the English adaptation of sha-ka-ԍéi, a Tlingit idiom which figuratively refers to rough seas in the Taiya Inlet, that are caused by strong north winds. Literally, skagway is a verbal noun which means pretty woman. The story behind the name is that Skagway [“Pretty Woman”] was the nickname of Kanagoo, a mythical woman who transformed herself into stone at Skagway Bay and who (according to the story) now causes the strong, channeled winds which blow toward Haines, Alaska. The rough seas caused by these winds have therefore been referred to figuratively by using Kanagoo's nickname, Skagway. The Kanagoo stone formation is now known as Face Mountain, which is seen from Skagway Bay. The Tlingit name for Face Mountain is Kanagoo Yahaayí [Kanagoo's Image/Soul]. (North winds prevail at Skagway from November to March. South winds prevail from April to October.) Skagway is also located at Klondike Highway Mile 0. Skagway River bridges are at Yakutania Point Trail Mile 0, Klondike Highway Mile 1.8, and WP&YR Mile Post 14.2.

Skagway River Branches:

1. East Fork: The East Fork branches off the Skagway River opposite WP&YR Mile Post 5. From there, the railroad follows the East Fork to Mile Post 5.8, where it makes a U-turn, crosses the East Fork, and loops back to follow the main river.
2. White Pass Fork: The Skagway River turns to the east, and White Pass Fork branches off to the north, opposite WP&YR Mile Post 12. From there, the railroad follows the Skagway River to Mile Post 14.2, where it makes a U-turn, crosses the Skagway River, and loops back to follow White Pass Fork.
3. Switchback Gulch: Switchback Gulch branches to the northeast, and Dead Horse Gulch branches to the north, opposite WP&YR Mile Post 18. From there, the railroad follows Switchback Gulch to Mile Post 18.6, where it makes a left turn and crosses Switchback Gulch.
4. Dead Horse Gulch: After crossing Switchback Gulch, the railroad goes through a tunnel which comes out at WP&YR Mile Post 18.8, along Dead Horse Gulch. From there, the railroad follows Dead Horse Gulch to its head at Pump House Lake, at Mile Post 20.

Slippery Rock [MP 15.6 Station] was named for the 50° to 60° rock slope adjacent to the track, from which snow and ice slide onto the tracks during the winter and spring.

Spirit Lake [Car #214] was named for the spirit of the Yukon, by U.S. Army troops during construction of the Alaska Highway in 1942. Lake located at Klondike Highway kilometer 116.

Squanga [Car #376] is the English adaptation of dasgwaanga, the Tagish and Tlingit name for "humpback" or lake whitefish. Ironically, Squanga Lake also contains whitefish now known as "Squanga whitefish," which are a different species from the lake [humpback] whitefish which gave this lake its name. Squanga Lake located at Alaska Highway kilometer 1315.9.

Stewart River [Car #328] was named for James G. Stewart (1825–1881), who discovered this river in 1849. River extends sinuously between Klondike Highway kilometers 535 and 594.

Stikine [Car #306] is the English adaptation of the Tlingit idiom sh táax’ héen, which figuratively refers to whirlpools and eddies found in the Stikine River. Literally, it means river water biting itself. River located 286 kilometers south of Alaska Highway Kilometer 1002, via Cassiar Highway.

Summit Lake [Cars 2nd 200, #262] was named for the White Pass summit. Lake located at Mile Post 21, just north of the White Pass summit.

Surprise Lake [Car #370] so named in 1898 by prospectors Kenneth C. McLaren and Frederick "Fritz" Miller. Previously, it had been one of at least four lakes which had borne the Tlingit name kusawa [narrow lake]. Surprise Lake located 18 kilometers east of Atlin, via Surprise Lake Road.

Switchback [former Mile Post 18.7 station] was named for the railroad switchback on the original, 1898-1901 alignment across Switchback Gulch (see, Skagway River Branches, above). The original alignment also included the first Bridge 18-A on the lower switchback leg, and Bridge 18-B crossing the Gulch on the upper switchback leg, both bridges being close to the switchback switch. From 1901 to 1969, the second Bridge 18-A ("Steel Bridge") crossed Switchback Gulch at Mile Post 18.3 and bypassed both legs and bridges of the original switchback. Since 1969, most of the south leg of the original switchback, plus the third Bridge 18-A across Switchback Gulch (at Mile Post 18.6), plus a tunnel have, in turn, bypassed the second Bridge 18-A.

Tagish [Cars ##248, 511] is the English adaptation of the Tagish phrase taa-gish, which means breakup of ice. This name refers to the sound that the Tagish River ice makes during spring breakup. The Tagish Indians adopted this name to identify themselves because, prior to 1898, they spent their winters along the Tagish River. The Tagish name for present-day Tagish Lake was Taku because the lake provided access to the Taku Tlingit people. Conversely, the Tlingit (and consequently English) name for present-day Tagish Lake is Tagish because the lake provided access to the Tagish people. Tagish Lake extends between Klondike Highway kilometers 78 and 95.

Taiya \tī•ye\ [Car #302] – circumstantial evidence suggests that this name is the English adaptation of the Tlingit name Dei Yé \dā ye\. Tlingit did not have the English long ī sound. As used, Dei Yé meant Way to the Trail. Specifically, Dei Yé – standing alone – was the Tlingit name for the combination of the present-day Taiya Inlet – plus the eight-mile, canoe-navigable portion of the present-day Taiya River, which begins at the mouth of the Nourse River. Other than Yé [Way], there was no word in the original name which would correspond to an inlet or to a river. Thus, the name Dei Yé referred to the Waterway to the Chilkoot Trail, from the south end of the Taiya Inlet, to the north end of canoe navigation on the Taiya River. A 1973 publication states that Taiya “purportedly” is the English adaptation of the words for “carrying place” [yaa yé]. However, the presence of the initial \t\ or \d\ sound in Taiya or \Deyah\ or \Dayay\ casts doubt on the yaa yé [carrying place] possibility, and suggests that the first syllable was in fact dei (as in dei yé). North of the Nourse River, the present-day Taiya River was named Sít’ Yayík [“Noisy Glacier,” a reference to nearby Sheep Camp Glacier]. (Note the distinction between the Tlingit possessed noun Dei-yi [Owned Trail], and the Tlingit phrase Dei Yé [Way to the Trail]. This distinction is reflected in the difference between the English names Dyea (village name) and Taiya. See, Chilkoot Trail, above.) Taiya River located at Dyea Road Mile 7.3.

Takhini [Cars ##284, 354] is the English adaptation of the Tlingit metaphor téix héeni, which literally means broth, and figuratively refers to Takhini Hot Springs. Takhini River located at Alaska Highway kilometer 1468.9, and at Klondike Highway kilometer 195.5.

Taku [Car #318, and former Taku Tram Mile 0 Station ] is a contraction of the Tlingit phrase t’aawák galakú, which means a flood of Canada geese. Taku River flows into the Taku Inlet, 18 miles northeast of Juneau.

"Tarahne" [Gasoline-Screw Propeller Boat] was directly derived from Tarahini, which was the name of a little creek at Atlin. The name Tarahini was suggested to the ship's carpenter by Chief Taku Jack (John Taku, Sr.). Tarahini was the English adaptation of the Tlingit phrase té yaa .aa hini, which means stream sitting along rock. Tarahini had been derived by eliminating yaa and by substituting the English \ra\ sound for the Tlingit aspirated \.aa\ sound. Thus, all vocal sounds in Tarahini occur in English. The reason for the subsequent alteration from Tarahini to "Tarahne" is not known.

Tatshenshini [Car #312] is the English adaptation of the Tlingit phrase t’á chaan sha-héeni, which means river with stinking chinook (king) salmon at its headwaters. This name refers to the dead salmon at the headwaters of the pre-1891 Tatshenshini River (subsequently the Blanchard River). These headwaters are along the Silver Lake Trail [Dáanáak’w Dei-yi], one of the three Chilkat trails between Haines and Hutshi Lake, Yukon). The headwaters were 100 miles from Haines via this trail. In 1891, the name Tatshenshini was reassigned to a different river. Pre-1891 Tatshenshini River (subsequently the Blanchard River) located at Haines Highway Kilometer 144.8. Post-1891 Tatshenshini River located 5 kilometers west of Haines Highway Kilometer 164, via Dalton Post Road.

Taye [likely candidate for a car name] – circumstantial evidence suggests that this name is the English adaptation of the Southern Tutchone word tàłe, which means northern pike. Northern pike are abundant in Taye Lake. Nevertheless, Tàłe [“Taye”] was not actually the Southern Tutchone name for the lake itself. The Southern Tutchone name for the lake itself is Chįį’a K’üa, which means Side Stream, Where One Sets Fish Traps for Spawning Salmon. The Tlingit name for the lake is \Yut-tae-ghat’\ or, more likely, Óot’-dei Xáat, which refers to Salmon Running Toward Stone Fishing Weirs – possibly, the same fish traps referred to in the Southern Tutchone name. (Salmon once were present in Taye Lake, but no longer are.) Taye Lake located 18 kilometers north of Champagne (Alaska Highway Kilometer 1513), along the Neskatahin Trail [Neskatahin Dei-yi].

Teslin [Car #242] is the English adaptation of the Northern Tutchone phrase dé-lin, which means flowing out. Teslin Lake extends between Alaska Highway kilometers 1244 and 1290.

"Thompson River" [Car #334] is the un-official name of the stream flowing from Meadows (Mile Post 25.4 Station) to Bernard Lake (at Mile Post 28.3). Received the name "Thompson River" by 1899. Most likely, named for Livingston Thompson (1851-1904), surveyor and Secretary of the Bennett Lake & Klondyke Navigation Co. Thompson was also a friend of William J. Rant, the British Columbia agent, magistrate, and assistant land commissioner for Bennett in 1898. The official name of this stream is Tutshi River.

Tincup Lake is named for a lake at a remote location north of Kluane Lake.

Tutshi [Car #260 and Steam-Stern Wheel Boat] is the English adaptation of the Tlingit metaphor t’ooch’ áayi, which literally means charcoal lake, and figuratively means dark lake. Tutshi Lake is darker than most lakes in the region because it is not fed by glacial runoff. Lake extends between Klondike Highway kilometers 57 and 70.

Utah [former Mile Post 105.5 Station] was the site of a camp of the Utah Construction Co. during construction of the Alaska Highway. Utah also located at Alaska Highway kilometer 1415.7.

Viaduct [Mile Post 5.9 Station] had been named for the East Fork Bridge, now Bridge 5-A. Station renamed to Denver in 1904.

Vista [Mile Post 36.1 Station] was named for the view from this location. Station had been named Barry until 2007 or 2008.

Wasson Lake [Car #368] was named for Everett L. Wasson (1910–1958), first bush pilot in the Yukon.

Watson [Mile Post 59.4 Station] was named for Thomas J. Watson (1861-1926) of Watson & Church, Skagway real estate agents during 1898-1899.

Watson Lake [Cars ##238, 502] was named for Francis G. "Frank" Watson (1883–1939), a Klondike stampeder. Lake located at Alaska Highway kilometer 980.

Wette Lea [former Mile Post 83.7 Station] was named for Auguste C. R. de Wette (1845-1912), banker and early shareholder of the WP&YR. Station renamed to De Wette in 1901.

White Pass [Mile Post 20.4 Station] was named for the Hon. Thomas W. White (1830-1888), Canadian Interior Minister, 1885-1888.

Whitehorse [former Mile Post 110.7 Station] was named for the appearance of rapids in the Yukon River, about two miles upstream from the railroad station. Since 1958, these rapids have been covered by Schwatka Lake. Until 1957, the city's name was spelled as two words: "White Horse." Whitehorse also located at Alaska Highway kilometer 1429.

Whiting River [Car #378] was named for U.S. Navy Surgeon Robert Whiting (1847–1897). River flows into Gilbert Bay, 33 nautical miles southeast of Juneau, via Stephens Passage.

Wigan [former Mile Post 104.8 Station] was named for Edward A. Wigan (1868-1942), early shareholder of the WP&YR.

Wolf Lake [Car #502] is a translation of the lake’s Tlingit name Gooch Áayi.

Yukon [Car #290], or Ųųg Han – Early Hudson’s Bay Company records report that this name is a contraction of the words in the Gwich'in phrase chųų gąįį han, which mean white water river and which refer to "the pale colour" of glacial runoff in the Yukon River. The contraction is Ųųg Han, if the \ųų\ remains nasalized, or Yuk Han, if there is no vowel nasalization. In the 1840s, different tribes had different opinions as to the literal meaning of Yukon. In 1843, the Holikachuks had told the Russian-American Company that their name for the river was Yukkhana and that this name meant "big river." However, Yukkhana does not literally correspond to a Holikachuk phrase that means big river. Then, two years later, the Gwich'ins told the Hudson's Bay Company that their name for the river was Yukon and that the name meant white water river. White water river in fact corresponds to Gwich'in words that can be shortened to form Yukon. Because the Holikachuks had been trading regularly with both the Gwich'ins and the Yup'iks, the Holikachuks were in a position to borrow the Gwich'in contraction and to conflate its meaning with the meaning of Kuig-pak [River-big], which is the Yup'ik name for the same river. For that reason, the documentary evidence suggests that the Holikachuks had borrowed the contraction Ųųg Han [White Water River] from Gwich'in, and erroneously assumed that this contraction had the same literal meaning as the corresponding Yup'ik name Kuig-pak [River-big]. Yukon River begins at the foot of Marsh Lake, 1 1/2 kilometers south of Alaska Highway Kilometer 1383.

== See also ==
For the complete roster of White Pass boats, see, List of steamboats on the Yukon River.

For the complete roster of White Pass winter stages, see, Overland Trail (Yukon).

== References and notes ==
Notes on Aboriginal Place Names

It is common for aboriginal place names to remain in English. Cruikshank, Julie (1990) "Getting the Words Right: Perspectives on Naming and Places in Athapaskan Oral History." 27 Arctic Anthropology (No. 1) 52, 63. ("[2] Names can persist. Place names ... are words which can be isolated, recorded, understood and learned by a non-speaker of the language and they can remain in English versions ..."). However, in order to represent aboriginal place names in writing, the pronunciations of these names had to be conformed to English phonology. The aboriginal languages had no written alphabet. Glave (2013). Travels to the Alseck., at page 5 (no written language). Furthermore, they had about 12 sounds that do not occur in English. Therefore, there were no symbols which corresponded to these non-English sounds. If the aboriginal place names were to be preserved in writing, the pronunciations had to be conformed to English sounds.

An example of a sound which does not occur in English is the initial consonant in the word Tlingit. It is a lateral sound, which means that it is made to the side of the tongue. Begin by holding the tip of the tongue against the roof of the mouth, as you would when you begin to pronounce a \d\ or \t\ sound. Then drop a side of the tongue and, instead, make a \thl\ sound on that side.

In addition, aboriginal place names usually describe some attribute of the place. See, Cruikshank (1990) "Getting the Words Right," at page 63 ("[3] Names provide a unique way of encoding information. Many of the names reflect changes in landscape or in movements of plants and animals."). Attributive place names were needed as a tool to guide the traveler. See, Davidson, George (1883). The Kohklux Map. Yukon Historical & Museums Assn., at page 25. The aboriginal traveler had to commit to memory only an attribute of a place, and no additional arbitrary name. This was of assistance, because the aboriginal languages had not been reduced to writing prior to the arrival of the English or Russian language.

As a consequence of having access only to information that could be remembered, people in the pre-1900 aboriginal societies had to deal with the world quite differently from people today.

== Bibliography ==
- Railway Carmen's Journal. Vol. 49–50. Brotherhood Railway Carmen of the United States and Canada. 1944. p. 226.
- "All-Time Roster of Locomotives: White Pass & Yukon Route". Railroad Magazine. 67–68. Frank A. Munsey Company: 69. 1955.
- Cy, Martin (1974). Gold Rush Narrow Gauge: The Story of the White Pass and Yukon Route. Trans-Anglo Books. p. 54, 64. ISBN 978-0-87-046026-5.
- Transport History. Vol. 10–11. Graphmitre Limited. 1979. p. 38.
- Howard Clifford (1981). Rails North: The Railroads of Alaska and the Yukon. Superior Publishing Company. p. 47. ISBN 978-0875645360.
- J. D. True (1987). Along the White Pass High Iron. Northbush Publications. ISBN 0-945284-00-4.
- J. David Conrad (1988). The Steam Locomotive Directory of North America. Vol. 1–2. Transportation Trails.
- J. D. True (1994). It Happened on the White Pass: The Life and Times of a Narrow-Gauge Railway Engineer. Northbush Publications. ISBN 1-896079-02-4.
- Wilson, Graham (1998). The White Pass and Yukon Route Railway. Wolf Creek Books. ISBN 978-0-96-819552-9.
