= White Pass and Yukon Route 195 =

Preserved S118 class 2-8-2 steam locomotive

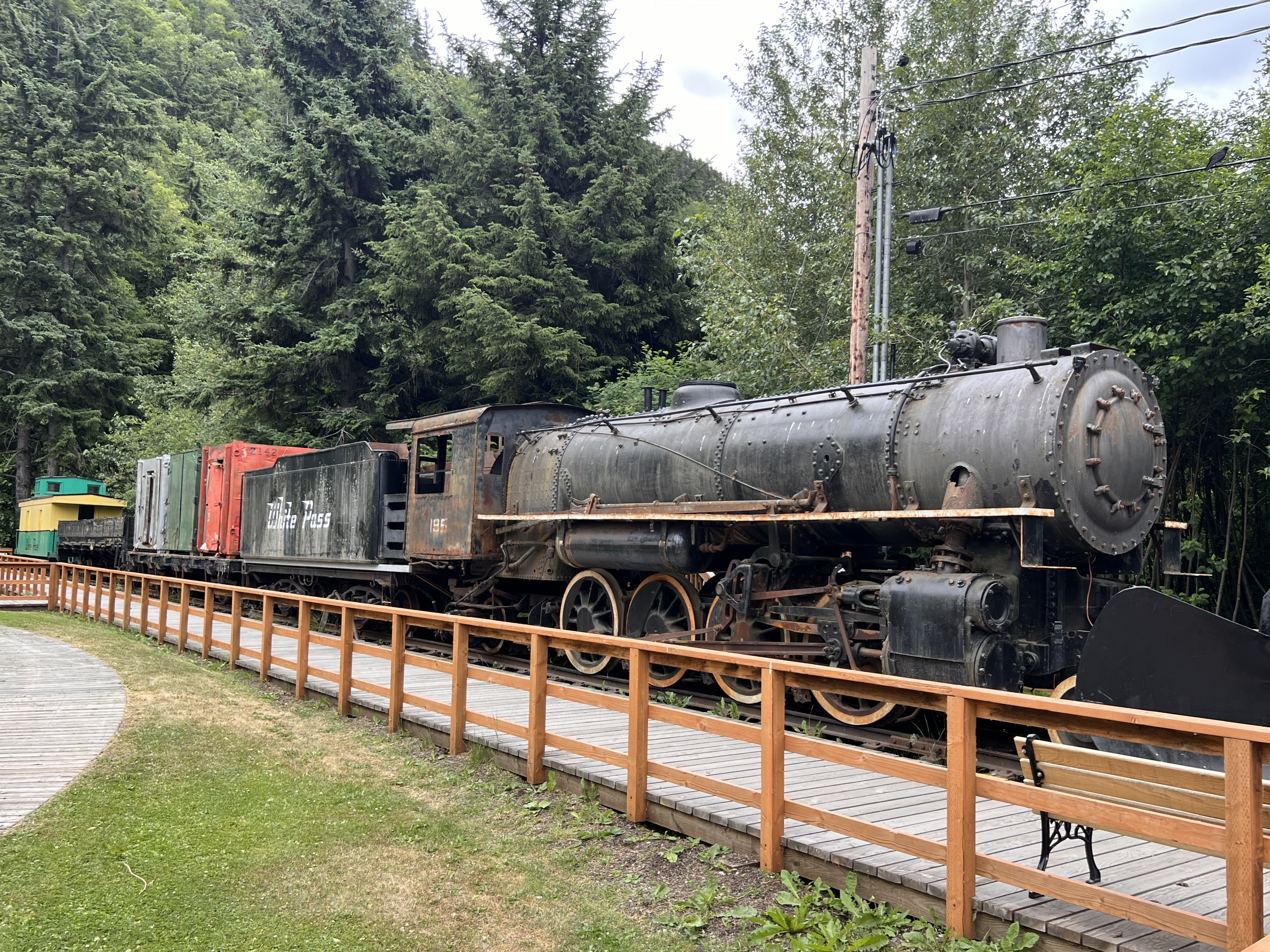
- No. 195 on static display in Skagway, Alaska, July 4, 2024
Type and origin
- Power type: Steam
- Builder: Baldwin Locomotive Works
- Serial number: 69827
- Model: S118
- Build date: February 1943
Specifications
- Configuration
  - Whyte: 2-8-2
- Gauge: 3 ft (914 mm)
- Driver dia.: 48 in (1.219 m)
- Wheelbase: 55 ft 8 1/2 in (16.98 m)
- Height: 12 ft 2 in (3.71 m)
- Adhesive weight: 119,000 lb (54.0 t)
- Loco weight: 210,000 lb (95.3 t)
- Total weight: 105 lb (0.0 t)
- Fuel type: New: Coal; Now: Oil
- Fuel capacity: Coal: 9 t (8.9 long tons; 9.9 short tons); Oil: 1,600 US gal (6,100 L; 1,300 imp gal)
- Water cap.: 5,000 US gal (19,000 L; 4,200 imp gal)
- Firebox
  - Grate area: 36 sq ft (3.3 m^{2})
- Boiler: 60 in (1.52 m) diameter
- Boiler pressure: 185 psi (1.28 MPa)
- Heating surface
  - Firebox: 115 sq ft (10.7 m^{2})
  - Tubes: 993 sq ft (92.3 m^{2})
  - Flues: 555 sq ft (51.6 m^{2})
  - Total surface: 1,371 sq ft (127.4 m^{2})
- Cylinders: Two, outside
- Cylinder size: 17 in × 22 in (432 mm × 559 mm)
- Valve gear: Walschaerts
- Valve type: Piston valves
- Loco brake: Air
- Train brakes: Air
- Couplers: Knuckle
Performance figures
- Tractive effort: 20,100 lbf (89 kN)
- Factor of adh.: 4.24
Career
- Operators: United States Army Transportation Corps; White Pass and Yukon Route
- Class: S118
- Number in class: 6th of 11
- Numbers: USATC 195; WPY 195
- Retired: 1956
- Current owner: City of Skagway
- Disposition: On static display

White Pass and Yukon Route 195 is a narrow-gauge S118 class 2-8-2 "Mikado" type steam locomotive, built by the Baldwin Locomotive Works (BLW) in 1943 for the United States Army Transportation Corps (USATC). It was later operated by the White Pass and Yukon Route (WPY). It is preserved and is on static display at the Skagway Museum in Skagway, Alaska.

== History ==
No. 195 was built in February 1943 by the Baldwin Locomotive Works (BLW) for the United States Army Transportation Corps (USATC), which used it to transport workers, troops, and materials to build the 1,520-mile Alaska Highway during World War II. In 1946, it was sold to the White Pass and Yukon Route (WPY), which gave it WPY lettering. In the early 1950s, the railroad converted No. 195 and several other S118-class engines to burn oil instead of coal.

No. 195 served the WPY for eleven years hauling freight and passenger trains until 1956, when it was retired from revenue service. For six years, it sat in storage on a side track with several other S118 locomotives waiting to be scrapped.

In 1962, No. 195 was donated to the City of Skagway and was preserved for static display at the Skagway Museum in downtown Skagway, Alaska, where it still sits today.

== Surviving sister engines ==
- No. 190 is currently operating at the Tweetsie Railroad theme park near Blowing Rock, North Carolina.
- No. 192 is currently operating for the Dollywood Express at the Dollywood theme park in Pigeon Forge, Tennessee.

== Bibliography ==
- "All-Time Roster of Locomotives: White Pass & Yukon Route". Railroad Magazine. 67–68. Frank A. Munsey Company: 69. 1955.
- Cy, Martin (1974). Gold Rush Narrow Gauge: The Story of the White Pass and Yukon Route. Trans-Anglo Books. ISBN 978-0-87-046026-5.
- Clifford, Howard (1981). Rails North: The Railroads of Alaska and the Yukon. Superior Publishing Company. p. 48. ISBN 978-0875645360.
- J. D. True (1994). It Happened on the White Pass: The Life and Times of a Narrow-Gauge Railway Engineer. Northbush Publications. ISBN 1-896079-02-4.
- Wilson, Graham (1998). The White Pass and Yukon Route Railway. Wolf Creek Books. ISBN 978-0-96-819552-9.
- Welbourn, Nigel (2023). Lost Railways of the World. Pen & Sword Books. p. 107. ISBN 978-1-39-909620-1.
