= White Pass and Yukon Route 190 =

Preserved S118 class 2-8-2 steam locomotive

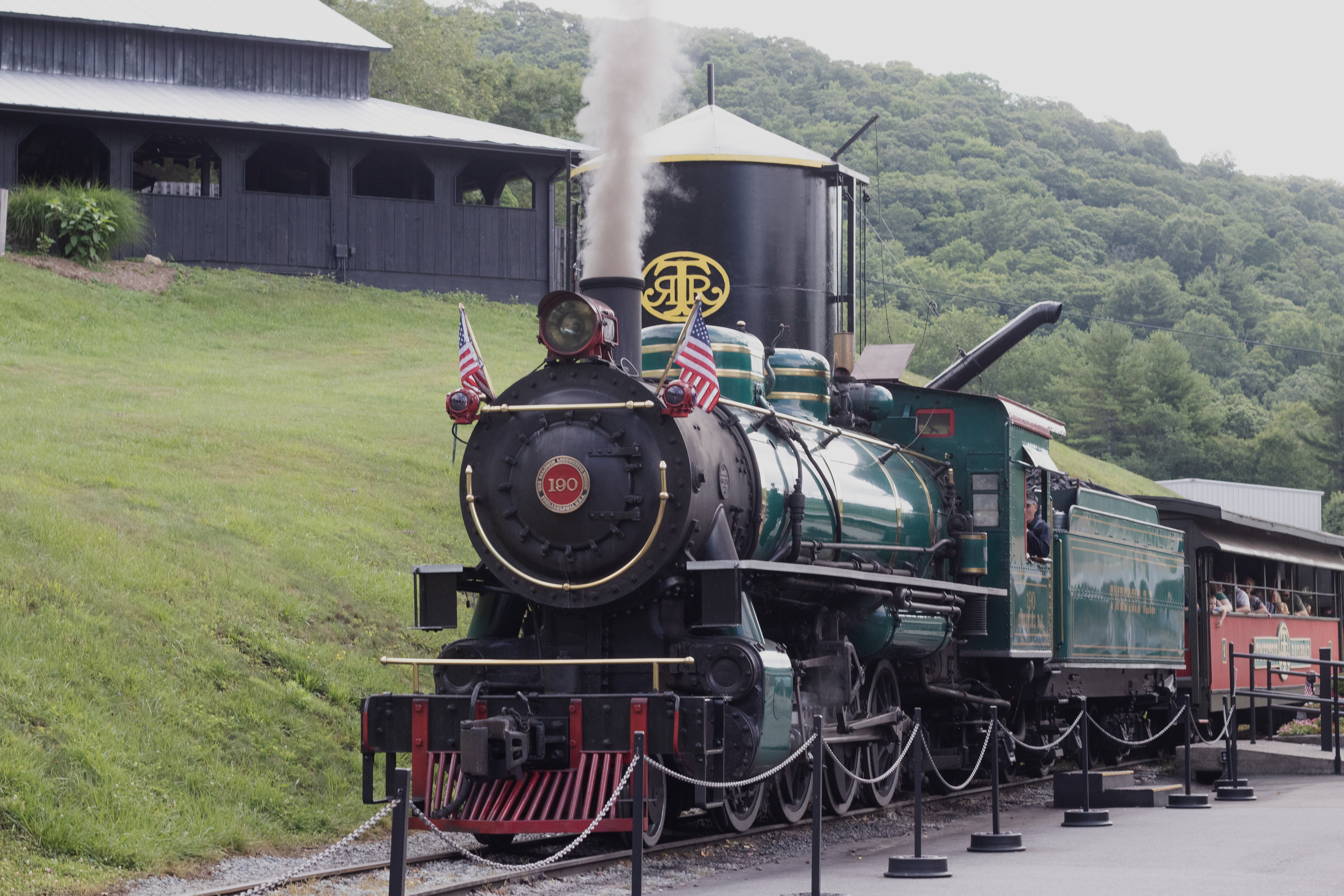
- No. 190 awaiting to depart from the station, July 15, 2022
Type and origin
- Power type: Steam
- Builder: Baldwin Locomotive Works
- Serial number: 69425
- Model: S118
- Build date: February 1943
Specifications
- Configuration
  - Whyte: 2-8-2
  - UIC: 1'D1 h2
- Gauge: 3 ft (914 mm)
- Leading dia.: 26 in (660 mm)
- Driver dia.: 48 in (1,219.2 mm)
- Trailing dia.: 30 in (760 mm)
- Wheelbase: 55 ft 8 1/2 in (16.98 m)
- Height: 12 ft 2 in (3.71 m)
- Adhesive weight: 119,000 lb (54.0 t)
- Loco weight: 210,000 lb (95.3 t)
- Total weight: 105 lb (0.0 t)
- Fuel type: New: Oil; Now: Coal
- Fuel capacity: Oil: 1,600 US gal (6,100 L; 1,300 imp gal); Coal: 9 t (8.9 long tons; 9.9 short tons)
- Water cap.: 5,000 US gal (19,000 L; 4,200 imp gal)
- Firebox
  - Grate area: 36 sq ft (3.3 m^{2})
- Boiler: 60 in (1.52 m) diameter
- Boiler pressure: 185 psi (1.28 MPa)
- Heating surface
  - Firebox: 115 sq ft (10.7 m^{2})
  - Tubes: 993 sq ft (92.3 m^{2})
  - Flues: 555 sq ft (51.6 m^{2})
  - Total surface: 1,371 sq ft (127.4 m^{2})
- Cylinders: Two, outside
- Cylinder size: 17 in × 22 in (432 mm × 559 mm)
- Valve gear: Walschaerts
- Valve type: Piston valves
- Loco brake: Air
- Train brakes: Air
- Couplers: Knuckle
Performance figures
- Tractive effort: 20,100 lbf (89 kN)
- Factor of adh.: 4.24
Career
- Operators: United States Army Transportation Corps; White Pass and Yukon Route; Tweetsie Railroad
- Class: S118
- Number in class: 1st of 11
- Numbers: USATC 190; WP&YR 190; TR 190
- Nicknames: Yukon Queen
- Retired: 1959
- Restored: 1960
- Current owner: Tweetsie Railroad
- Disposition: Operational

White Pass and Yukon Route 190 is a narrow-gauge S118 class 2-8-2 "Mikado" type steam locomotive, built by the Baldwin Locomotive Works (BLW) in 1943 for the United States Army Transportation Corps (USATC) and later the White Pass and Yukon Route (WPY). It is preserved and operated by the Tweetsie Railroad (TR), located near Blowing Rock, North Carolina.

== History ==
No. 190 was built in February 1943 by the Baldwin Locomotive Works (BLW) for service of the United States Army Transportation Corps (USATC) to haul materials to build the ALCAN highway and transport soldiers during World War II. In 1946, it was sold to the White Pass and Yukon Route (WPY) and was reassigned with WPY lettering; there, it was nicknamed Yukon Queen, due to it being the railroad's very first S118 locomotive; during this time, the engine was converted to oil instead of coal.

No. 190 would serve the WPY for thirteen years hauling freight and passenger trains until it was retired from revenue service in 1959; it was placed in storage on a side track with several other S118 locomotives awaiting to be scrapped.

In April 1960, it was purchased by master mechanic Frank Coffey to assist ET&WNC 12 for tourism at Grover Robbins Jr.'s Tweetsie Railroad (TR) theme park in Blowing Rock, North Carolina. The engine would be converted back to coal during its restoration; after several months of work, the engine made its first run on Tweetsie Railroad trackage that same year.

In February 1967, both Nos. 190 and 12 were remodified with diamond stacks and bright paint to make them look like the railroad took place in the wild west, but the modifications were later removed in the mid 1970s.

In 2000, No. 190 was removed from service and underwent a major overhaul to its original condition.

On August 26-27, 2017, No. 190 ran a doubleheader special with No. 12 in celebration of the park's 60th anniversary and No. 12's 100th birthday.

In 2018, No. 190 celebrated its 75th birthday. In September 2023, No. 190 celebrated its 80th birthday and was briefly backdated to its 1960s-70s appearance with the woodburning smokestack and the "Tweetsie Railroad" banner on the front of it.

Today, No. 190 continues to serve as backup power for No. 12 and also runs the Ghost Train event every September and October season.

== Surviving sister engines ==
- No. 192 is currently operating for the Dollywood Express at the Dollywood theme park in Pigeon Forge, Tennessee.
- No. 195 is currently on static display near the Skagway Museum in Skagway, Alaska.

== Bibliography ==
- "All-Time Roster of Locomotives: White Pass & Yukon Route". Railroad Magazine. 67–68. Frank A. Munsey Company: 69. 1955.
- Cy, Martin (1974). Gold Rush Narrow Gauge: The Story of the White Pass and Yukon Route. Trans-Anglo Books. ISBN 978-0-87-046026-5.
- Clifford, Howard (1981). Rails North: The Railroads of Alaska and the Yukon. Superior Publishing Company. p. 48. ISBN 978-0875645360.
- J. D. True (1987). Along the White Pass High Iron. Northbush Publications. ISBN 0-945284-00-4.
- J. D. True (1994). It Happened on the White Pass: The Life and Times of a Narrow-Gauge Railway Engineer. Northbush Publications. ISBN 1-896079-02-4.
- Wilson, Graham (1998). The White Pass and Yukon Route Railway. Wolf Creek Books. ISBN 978-0-96-819552-9.
