= White Pass and Yukon Route 192 =

Preserved S118 class 2-8-2 steam locomotive

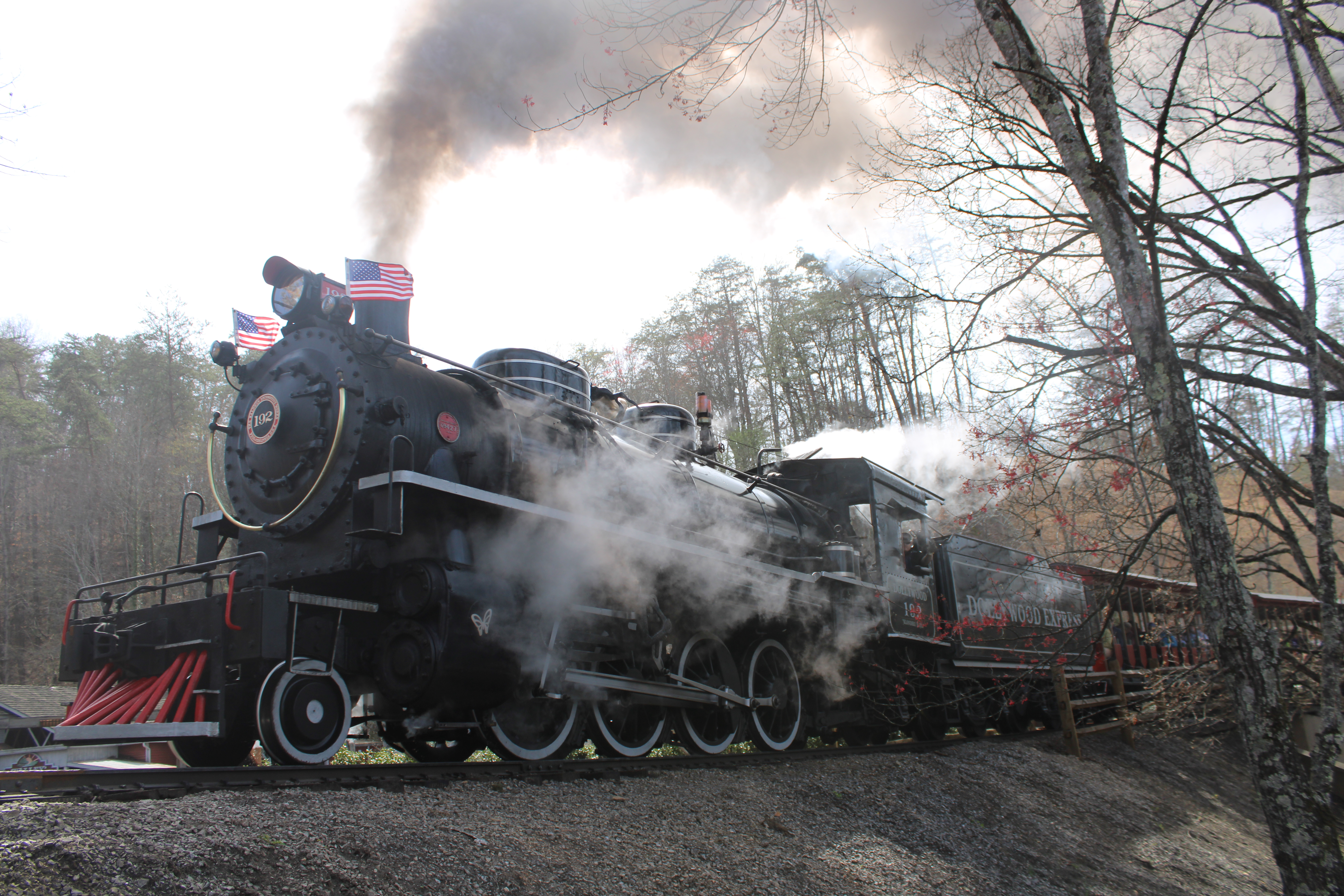
- No. 192 hauling a Dollywood Express train over Owens Farm Crossing, March 11, 2023
Type and origin
- Power type: Steam
- Builder: Baldwin Locomotive Works
- Serial number: 69427
- Model: S118
- Build date: February 1943
Specifications
- Configuration
  - Whyte: 2-8-2
- Gauge: 3 ft (914 mm)
- Driver dia.: 48 in (1.219 m)
- Wheelbase: 55 ft 8 1/2 in (16.98 m)
- Height: 12 ft 2 in (3.71 m)
- Adhesive weight: 119,000 lb (54.0 t)
- Loco weight: 210,000 lb (95.3 t)
- Total weight: 105 lb (0.0 t)
- Fuel type: New: Coal; Now: Oil
- Fuel capacity: Coal: 9 t (8.9 long tons; 9.9 short tons); Oil: 1,600 US gal (6,100 L; 1,300 imp gal)
- Water cap.: 5,000 US gal (19,000 L; 4,200 imp gal)
- Firebox
  - Grate area: 36 sq ft (3.3 m^{2})
- Boiler: 60 in (1.52 m) diameter
- Boiler pressure: 185 psi (1.28 MPa)
- Heating surface
  - Firebox: 115 sq ft (10.7 m^{2})
  - Tubes: 993 sq ft (92.3 m^{2})
  - Flues: 555 sq ft (51.6 m^{2})
  - Total surface: 1,371 sq ft (127.4 m^{2})
- Cylinders: Two, outside
- Cylinder size: 17 in × 22 in (432 mm × 559 mm)
- Valve gear: Walschaerts
- Valve type: Piston valves
- Loco brake: Air
- Train brakes: Air
- Couplers: Knuckle
Performance figures
- Tractive effort: 20,100 lbf (89 kN)
- Factor of adh.: 4.24
Career
- Operators: United States Army Transportation Corps; White Pass and Yukon Route; Dollywood Express
- Class: S118
- Number in class: 3rd of 11
- Numbers: USATC 192; WPY 192; DE 192
- Nicknames: Big John; Daddy Bryson; Klandike Katie
- Retired: 1957
- Restored: July 1961
- Current owner: Herschend Enterprises
- Disposition: Operational

White Pass and Yukon Route 192 is a narrow-gauge S118 class 2-8-2 "Mikado" type steam locomotive, built by the Baldwin Locomotive Works (BLW) in 1943 for the United States Army Transportation Corps (USATC) and later the White Pass and Yukon Route (WPY). It is preserved and operated by the Dollywood Express (DE) at the Dollywood amusement theme park in Pigeon Forge, Tennessee.

== History ==
No. 192 was built in February 1943 by the Baldwin Locomotive Works (BLW) for the United States Army Transportation Corps (USATC), which used it to transport workers, troops, and materials to build the 1,520-mile ALCAN Highway during World War II. In 1946, it was sold to the White Pass and Yukon Route (WPY) where it was reassigned with WPY lettering; during the early 1950s, No. 192 was converted to burn oil instead of coal along with several other S118 class engines.

No. 192 would serve the WPY for eleven years hauling freight and passenger trains until it was retired from revenue service in 1957; it was placed in storage on a side track with several other S118 locomotives for four years awaiting to be scrapped.

In 1961, it was purchased by master mechanic Frank Coffey to operate tourist trains at Grover Robbins Jr.'s second theme park, the Rebel Railroad (now Dollywood) in Pigeon Forge, Tennessee. (Note: Attributed to multiple sources:) The engine would be converted back to coal during its restoration.

The park officially opened to the public in July 1961 and No. 192 made its first run over the Rebel Railroad trackage; since then, the engine (now called Klondike Katie), continues to haul excursion trains around the 5-mile track at the theme park, alongside former WPY No. 70. (Note: Attributed to multiple sources:)

On February 24, 2026, Dollywood officials announced that they would convert Nos. 192 and 70 back to burn oil instead of coal. This will enable them to run more in unfavorable conditions and to reduce maintenance and pollution, enabling them to run in less favorable weather.

== Surviving sister engines ==
- No. 190 is currently operating at the Tweetsie Railroad theme park near Blowing Rock, North Carolina.
- No. 195 is currently on static display near the Skagway Museum in Skagway, Alaska.

== Bibliography ==
- "All-Time Roster of Locomotives: White Pass & Yukon Route". Railroad Magazine. 67–68. Frank A. Munsey Company: 69. 1955.
- Cy, Martin (1974). Gold Rush Narrow Gauge: The Story of the White Pass and Yukon Route. Trans-Anglo Books. ISBN 978-0-87-046026-5.
- Clifford, Howard (1981). Rails North: The Railroads of Alaska and the Yukon. Superior Publishing Company. p. 48. ISBN 978-0875645360.
- National Railway Bulletin. Vol. 69. National Railway Historical Society. 2004. p. 27-28, 30, 32.
- J. D. True (1987). Along the White Pass High Iron. Northbush Publications. ISBN 0-945284-00-4.
- J. D. True (1994). It Happened on the White Pass: The Life and Times of a Narrow-Gauge Railway Engineer. Northbush Publications. ISBN 1-896079-02-4.
- The Historic Railroad: A Guide to Museums, Depots, and Excursions in the United States. McFarland & Company. 1996. p. 185. ISBN 978-0-78-640040-9.
- Wilson, Graham (1998). The White Pass and Yukon Route Railway. Wolf Creek Books. ISBN 978-0-96-819552-9.
