= Baldwin Class 12-28 ¼ E =

Class of Baldwin-built 2-8-2 "Mikado" steam locomotives

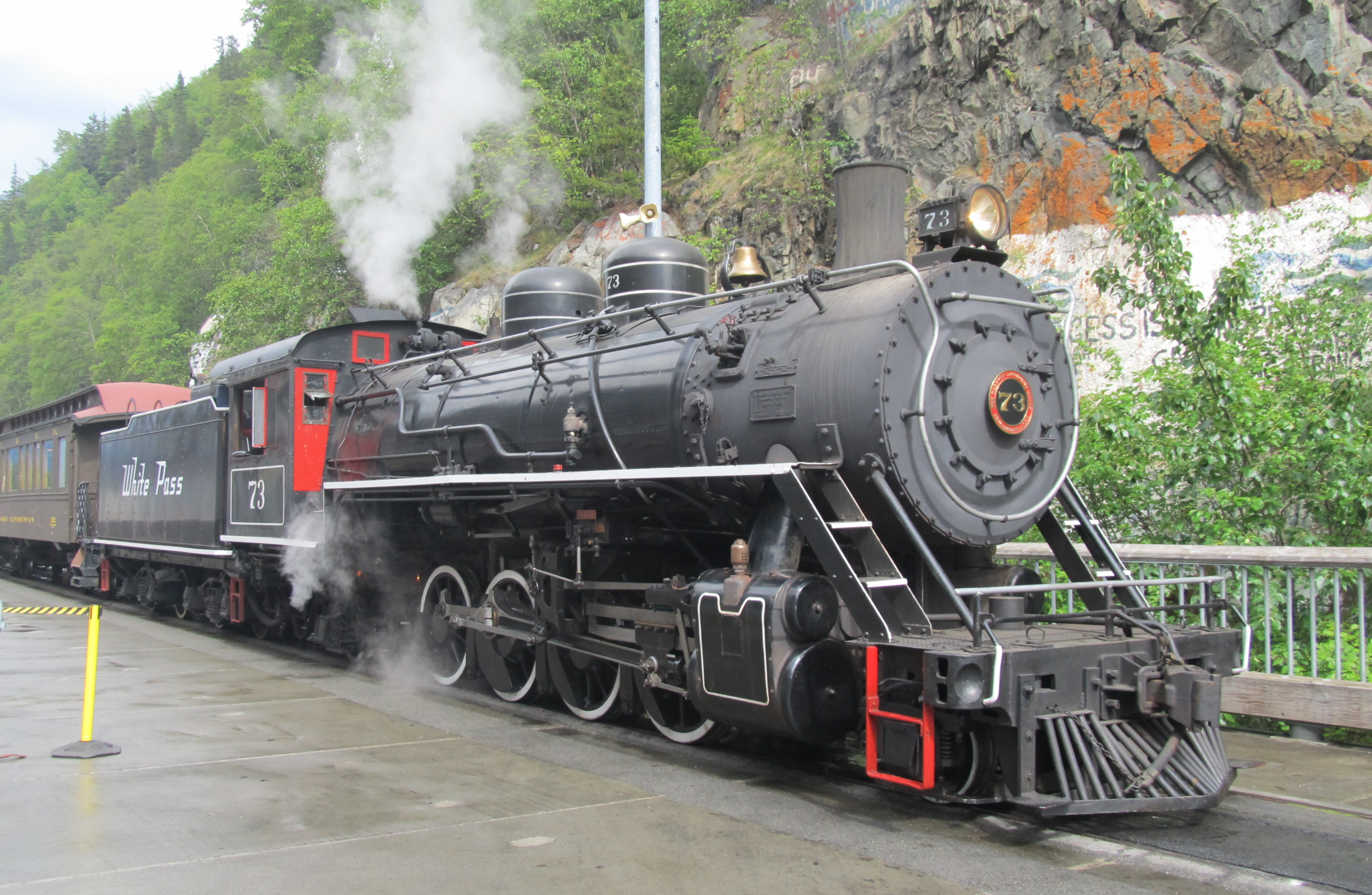
- No. 73 stopped at a station with an excursion train, July 23, 2017
Type and origin
- Power type: Steam
- Builder: Baldwin Locomotive Works
- Model: 12-28 ¼ E
- Build date: 1911–1947
Specifications
- Configuration
  - Whyte: 2-8-2
  - UIC: 1′D1′ h2
- Gauge: 3 ft (914 mm)
- Driver dia.: 44 in (1.118 m)
- Wheelbase: 55 ft 8 1/2 in (16.98 m)
- Height: 12 ft 7 in (3.84 m)
- Adhesive weight: 108,000 lb (49.0 t)
- Loco weight: 145,000 lb (65.8 t)
- Total weight: 248,400 lb (112.7 t)
- Fuel type: Coal, later oil
- Fuel capacity: Coal: 8 t (7.9 long tons; 8.8 short tons); Oil: 2,500 US gal (9,500 L; 2,100 imp gal)
- Water cap.: 5,000 US gal (19,000 L; 4,200 imp gal)
- Firebox
  - Grate area: 36 sq ft (3.3 m^{2})
- Boiler: 64 in (1.63 m) diameter
- Boiler pressure: 220 lbf/in^{2} (220.00 psi; 1.52 MPa; 1,516.85 kPa)
- Heating surface
  - Firebox: 114 sq ft (10.6 m^{2})
  - Tubes: 993 sq ft (92.3 m^{2})
  - Flues: 555 sq ft (51.6 m^{2})
  - Total surface: 1,676 sq ft (155.7 m^{2})
- Cylinders: Two, outside
- Cylinder size: 17 in × 22 in (432 mm × 559 mm)
- Valve gear: Walschaerts
- Valve type: Piston valves
- Loco brake: Air
- Train brakes: Air
- Couplers: Knuckle
Performance figures
- Tractive effort: 25,200 lbf (112.1 kN)
- Factor of adh.: 4.24
Career
- Operators: White Pass and Yukon Route
- Class: 12-28 ¼ E
- Nicknames: Hog
- Retired: 1963–1964
- Preserved: 4
- Restored: 1982 (No. 73); 1987 (No. 70)
- Disposition: 4 preserved, 1 scrapped during preservation

The Baldwin Class 12-28 ¼ E was a series of 2-8-2 "Mikado" type steam locomotives that were built by the Baldwin Locomotive Works for several narrow-gauge railroads.

== History ==
The class of 2-8-2 "Mikado" type steam locomotives were designed in the 1910s with one example East Broad Top #12 "Millie" being built in December 1911, where it was classified by East Broad Top as a Baldwin 12-28 E-1.

But in the 1930s, an updated version was drawn up. This version had 44-inch (1,120 mm) driving wheels, a pair of 17-by-22-inch (430 mm × 560 mm) cylinders, a boiler pressure of 205 psi (1.41 MPa), a tractive effort of 25,200 lbf (112 kN) and weighed in at 72 tons without the tender (115.25 tons with tender). Their tenders could hold up to 8 tons of coal and 4,000 US gallons (15,000 L; 3,300 imp gal) of water.

The locomotive class were often referred to as Hog by the crew members, due to their high fuel consumption.

== Preservation ==
Only four locomotives of the Baldwin Class 12-28 ¼ E are still in preservation.

=== Currently preserved ===
| Photograph | Locomotive | Serial no. | Build date | Operator | Status | Notes | Refs |
|---|---|---|---|---|---|---|---|
| | East Broad Top Railroad 12 "Millie" | 37325 | December 1911 | East Broad Top Railroad | Stored, awaiting restoration | | |
| | White Pass and Yukon Route 70 | 62234 | May 1938 | White Pass and Yukon Route; Dollywood Express | Operational | | |
| | White Pass and Yukon Route 71 | 62257 | January 1939 | White Pass and Yukon Route | Stored, awaiting restoration | | |
| | White Pass and Yukon Route 73 | 73352 | May 1947 | White Pass and Yukon Route | Operational | | |

=== Formerly preserved, scrapped ===
| Photograph | Locomotive | Serial no. | Build date | Operator | Scrapped | Cause of scrapping | Refs |
|---|---|---|---|---|---|---|---|
| | White Pass and Yukon Route 72 | 73351 | 1947 | White Pass and Yukon Route | 1974 (boiler) | Involved in a roundhouse fire in 1969. | |

== Accidents and incidents ==
- In 1940, 1951 and 1955, No. 70 was involved in three major accidents while working on the WPY, where it rolled over on its side three separate times. The locomotive would be repaired three separate times after the incidents and would continue service.
- In 1946, No. 71 was traveling southbound to Whitehorse, Alaska with several freight and passenger cars, as it rounded a curve, the locomotive ran into a gasoline motor car that was on the same track, damaging No. 71's pilot truck. One crew worker suffered a broken leg while the second suffered minor injuries. No. 71's pilot truck was repaired and the locomotive returned to service.
- In the winter of 1948, No. 72 was hauling a freight train when a snowslide hit the side of the engine and knocked it onto its right side, burying the engineer and fireman in the snow. Both engineer and firman were rescued and the locomotive was eventually pulled up from the bank of snow, repaired and returned to service.
- In October 1969, No. 72 was involved in a roundhouse fire that destroyed the locomotive's boiler. It was scrapped in 1974, except for the drive wheels, which are now on No. 70.

== Sources ==
- Railway Carmen's Journal. Vol. 49–50. Brotherhood Railway Carmen of the United States and Canada. 1944. p. 226.
- True, J. D. (1994). It Happened on the White Pass: The Life and Times of a Narrow-Gauge Railway Engineer. Northbush Publications. ISBN 1-896079-02-4.
