= Queensland AC16 class locomotive =

Class of Australian 2-8-2 locomotives

Queensland Railways AC16 class
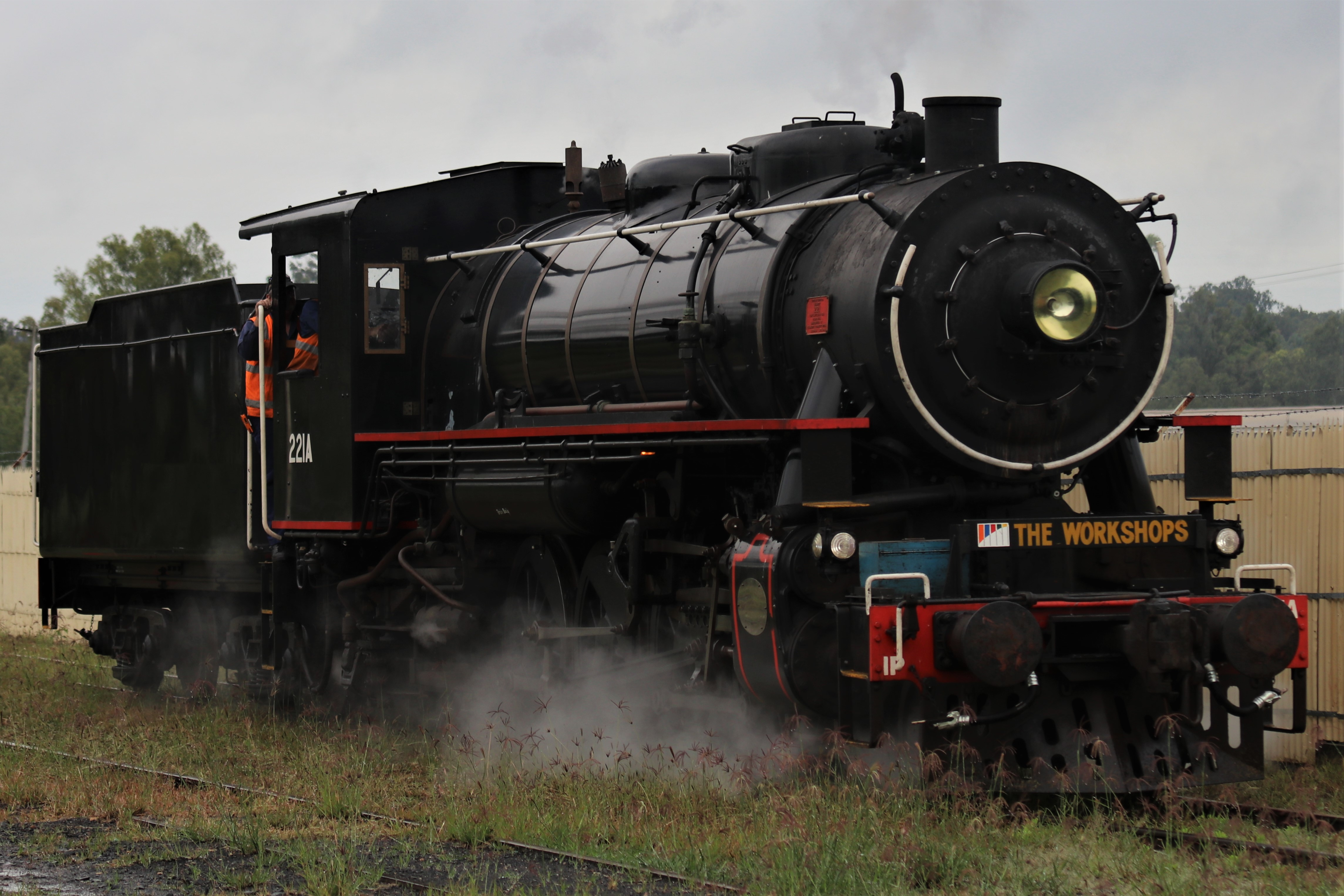
- AC16 221A pictured outside the Ipswich Railway Workshops
Type and origin
- Power type: Steam
- Builder: Baldwin Locomotive Works
- Serial number: 69451-69470
- Model: USATC S118 Class
- Build date: 1943
- Total produced: 20
Specifications
- Configuration
  - Whyte: 2-8-2
- Gauge: 1,067 mm (3 ft 6 in)
- Leading dia.: 2 ft 2 in (660 mm)
- Driver dia.: 4 ft 0 in (1,219 mm)
- Trailing dia.: 2 ft 6 in (762 mm)
- Length: 59 ft 5 1/2 in (18.12 m)
- Adhesive weight: 80,000 lb (36,300 kg)
- Loco weight: 119,000 lb (54,000 kg)
- Fuel type: Coal
- Firebox
  - Grate area: 27.7 sq ft (2.57 m^{2})
- Boiler pressure: 185 lbf/in^{2} (1,276 kPa)
- Heating surface
  - Firebox: 115 sq ft (10.7 m^{2})
  - Tubes and flues: 1,256 sq ft (116.7 m^{2})
- Superheater
  - Heating area: 347 sq ft (32.2 m^{2})
- Cylinders: 2 outside
- Cylinder size: 16 in × 24 in (406 mm × 610 mm)
- Valve gear: Walschaerts
Performance figures
- Tractive effort: 20,128 lbf (89.53 kN)
Career
- Operators: Queensland Railways; Zig Zag Railway
- Numbers: 216A-235A
- Nicknames: Yank
- Preserved: 218A, 221A
- Disposition: 2 preserved, 18 scrapped

The Queensland Railways AC16 class locomotive is a class of 2-8-2 steam locomotives operated by the Queensland Railways.

== History ==
World War II and the occupation by Japanese forces of Pacific Islands and islands to the north of Australia saw Queensland placed under the threat of imminent attack. This placed a great strain on Queensland Railway's resources in the movement of wartime supplies and troops.

A request was made in 1941 for further, new C17 class locomotives and the specifications were forwarded to the United States where the United States Army Transportation Corps (USATC) drew up plans for a 2-8-2 with specifications similar to a C17 class, which became the USATC S118 Class. These locomotives were intended as a standard design for use on narrow gauge railways in other parts of the world as a wartime measure. Thus twenty engines obtained from the United States under Lend-Lease arrangements and later purchased. They were the only ones of their type to come to Australia out of a total of 741 similar engines built for USATC. They were unloaded in Sydney in 1943 and railed to Brisbane for assembly.

Per Queensland Railway's classification system they were designated the AC16 class, C representing they had four driving axles, and the 16 the cylinder diameter in inches. Because the classification was already being used by an existing class they were designated American C16, i.e. AC16. The American steam locomotive earned it the nickname of Yank. The engines entered traffic with their US Army road numbers but had "A" appended to differentiate them from existing engines with the same numbers.

The engines were supplied with conical profile tyres. These were altered to QR standard cylindrical profile and pressed one-sixteenth of an inch inwards on the wheels to reduce wear. In 1943 the decision was taken to alter the second and third coupled wheels to thin flanges. A number of other modifications were carried out over the years.

The engines were fitted with Walschaerts valve gear. The original tenders rode poorly and resulted in a speed limit of 30 mph being imposed with a prohibition on passenger train working. The axle load of these tenders also restricted the engines to main line usage. The floor level shovelling plate made the fireman's work more difficult. One feature that did prove popular was the use of louvre coal boards and these subsequently became standard on all QR steam engines. The headlight mounted on the smokebox door proved to have advantages and was later adopted for some other classes.

In 1958, No. 217A was fitted with a tender taken from a withdrawn C16 class locomotive. The previous restrictions were then lifted. All 19 members of the class then remaining in service had been similarly treated by 1963.

After being fitted with these tenders, seven of the class was attached to Alpha where they had a brief period of glory in the early 1960s when they replaced the C17 Class hauling the air-conditioned Midlander between Alpha and Longreach. The American engines with a larger boiler capacity were able to reduce running times in the sections that contained many long banks. Diesel locomotives took over the working in 1963.

== Preservation ==
Two have been preserved:

- 218A "The Yank" at the Zig Zag Railway, Lithgow, restored to working order in 2008 and later in 2021.
- 221A at the Workshops Rail Museum, restored to working order in 2003
