= Fred Kirby =

American singer-songwriter

Frederick Austin Kirby (July 19, 1910 - April 22, 1996) was an American country-and-western recording and performance artist and song writer.

== Life and work ==
Among Kirby's better-known works are "Atomic Power" (1946) and "When That Hell Bomb Falls" (1950), both inspired by the emergence of nuclear weapons during and after World War II. During that same war, Kirby performed to raise money for the American effort to the extent that he became known as the Victory Cowboy.

After the war Kirby was widely known in North and South Carolina for his radio and television work with WBTV in Charlotte, North Carolina. The station aired a program that featured Kirby and his sidekick "Uncle Jim" (played by Jim Patterson). The show was known at various times as "Whistle Stop," "Fred Kirby's Little Rascals," "Three-Ring Circus" and "Kirby's Corral." Giving the "hi-sign" to his young fans, Kirby was a fixture for many years at the western-themed park Tweetsie Railroad in Blowing Rock, North Carolina. He appeared there nearly every weekend during the park's summer season. Even though he died in 1996, his birthday is still honored by Tweetsie. Kirby's television show treated viewers to classic episodes of The Little Rascals (Hal Roach's Our Gang) as well as frequent appearances by the local bluegrass band The Briarhoppers.
