= White Pass and Yukon Route 71 =

Preserved narrow gauge 2-8-2 locomotive

Type and origin
- Power type: Steam
- Builder: Baldwin Locomotive Works
- Serial number: 62257
- Model: 12 28¼ E
- Build date: January 1939
Specifications
- Configuration
  - Whyte: 2-8-2
  - UIC: 1′D1′ h2
- Gauge: 3 ft (914 mm)
- Driver dia.: 44 in (1.118 m)
- Wheelbase: 55 ft 8 1/2 in (16.98 m)
- Height: 12 ft 7 in (3.84 m)
- Adhesive weight: 108,000 lb (49.0 t)
- Loco weight: 235,000 lb (106.6 t)
- Total weight: 43.25 lb (0.0 t)
- Fuel type: New: Coal; Now: Oil
- Fuel capacity: Coal: 8 t (7.9 long tons; 8.8 short tons); Oil: 2,500 US gal (9,500 L; 2,100 imp gal)
- Water cap.: 4,000 US gal (15,000 L; 3,300 imp gal)
- Firebox
  - Grate area: 36 sq ft (3.3 m^{2})
- Boiler: 64 in (1.63 m) diameter
- Boiler pressure: 205 psi (1.41 MPa)
- Heating surface
  - Firebox: 114 sq ft (10.6 m^{2})
  - Tubes: 993 sq ft (92.3 m^{2})
  - Flues: 555 sq ft (51.6 m^{2})
  - Total surface: 1,676 sq ft (155.7 m^{2})
- Cylinders: Two, outside
- Cylinder size: 17 in × 22 in (432 mm × 559 mm)
- Valve gear: Walschaerts
- Valve type: Piston valves
- Loco brake: Air
- Train brakes: Air
- Couplers: Knuckle
Performance figures
- Tractive effort: 25,179 lbf (112.0 kN)
- Factor of adh.: 4.24
Career
- Operators: White Pass and Yukon Route; United States Army Transportation Corps (leased)
- Class: 12-28 ¼ E
- Number in class: 2nd of 4
- Numbers: WPY 71; USATC 71
- Nicknames: Beatrice
- Retired: April 1963
- Current owner: Herschend Enterprises
- Disposition: Stored, awaiting restoration

White Pass and Yukon Route 71 is a narrow-gauge 2-8-2 "Mikado" type steam locomotive, built in 1939 by the Baldwin Locomotive Works (BLW). It is preserved by the Dollywood Express (DE) at the Dollywood amusement theme park in Pigeon Forge, Tennessee, where it is currently stored out of service.

== History ==
No. 71 was built in January 1939 by the Baldwin Locomotive Works (BLW) for the White Pass and Yukon Route (WPY). It was the second of the four 70-class locomotives that were constructed for the WPY between 1938 and 1947. (Note: Attributed to multiple sources:)

The engine worked hauling both freight and passenger trains until it was later assigned and leased to the United States Army Transportation Corps (USATC) to haul materials and transport soldiers for construction of the ALCAN highway during World War II. It was originally built as a coal burner, but was later converted to burn oil in the 1950s along with several other 70-class engines.

The locomotive eventually returned to the WPY after the war ended and it resumed hauling freight and passenger trains until it, along with No. 70, were retired from revenue service in April 1963. Both locomotives would be left on a sidetrack at the Skagway railyard for the next fourteen years.

In 1977, No. 71 and No. 70, along with some spare parts from No. 72, were sold to Silver Dollar City Tennessee (now Dollywood), a theme park in Pigeon Forge, Tennessee. (Note: Attributed to multiple sources:) In 1987, No. 70 would be restored to operating condition to help assist No. 192 with excursion trains.

Today, No. 71 sits out of service disassembled and is awaiting for a possible restoration to operating condition.

== Accidents and incidents ==
In 1946, No. 71 was traveling southbound to Whitehorse, Alaska with several freight and passenger cars, as it rounded a curve, the locomotive ran into a gasoline motor car that was on the same track, damaging No. 71's pilot truck. One crew worker suffered a broken leg while the second suffered minor injuries. No. 71's pilot truck was repaired and the locomotive returned to service.

== Bibliography ==
- Railway Carmen's Journal. Vol. 49–50. Brotherhood Railway Carmen of the United States and Canada. 1944. p. 226.
- "All-Time Roster of Locomotives: White Pass & Yukon Route". Railroad Magazine. 67–68. Frank A. Munsey Company: 69. 1955.
- J. David Conrad (1988). The Steam Locomotive Directory of North America. Vol. 1–2. Transportation Trails.
- Martin, Cy (1974). Gold Rush Narrow Gauge: The Story of the White Pass and Yukon Route. Trans-Anglo Books. p. 54, 64. ISBN 978-0-87-046026-5.
- Transport History. Vol. 10–11. Graphmitre Limited. 1979. p. 38.
- Clifford, Howard (1981). Rails North: The Railroads of Alaska and the Yukon. Superior Publishing Company. p. 47. ISBN 978-0875645360.
- True, J. D. (1987). Along the White Pass High Iron. Northbush Publications. ISBN 0-945284-00-4.
- True, J. D. (1994). It Happened on the White Pass: The Life and Times of a Narrow-Gauge Railway Engineer. Northbush Publications. ISBN 1-896079-02-4.
- Wilson, Graham (1998). The White Pass and Yukon Route Railway. Wolf Creek Books. ISBN 978-0-96-819552-9.
