= East Tennessee and Western North Carolina 12 =

Preserved American narrow-gauge 4-6-0 locomotive

East Tennessee and Western North Carolina Railroad 12
- No. 12 hauling a passenger train over a trestle, March 25, 2000
Type and origin
- Power type: Steam
- Builder: Baldwin Locomotive Works
- Serial number: 45069
- Model: 10-26-D
- Build date: February 1917
Specifications
- Configuration
  - Whyte: 4-6-0
- Gauge: 3 ft (914 mm)
- Leading dia.: 33 in (838 mm)
- Driver dia.: 45 in (1143 mm)
- Loco weight: 98,800 lb (44,800 kg)
- Total weight: 60,000 lb (27,000 kg)
- Fuel type: Coal
- Fuel capacity: 4 t (3.9 long tons; 4.4 short tons)
- Water cap.: 3,000 US gal (11,000 L; 2,500 imp gal)
- Boiler pressure: 180 psi (1.24 MPa)
- Cylinders: Two, outside
- Cylinder size: 16 in × 22 in (406 mm × 559 mm)
- Valve gear: Walschaerts
- Valve type: Piston valves
- Loco brake: Air
- Train brakes: Air
- Couplers: Knuckle
Performance figures
- Tractive effort: 19,100 lbf (85 kN)
Career
- Operators: East Tennessee and Western North Carolina Railroad Shenandoah Central Tweetsie Railroad
- Class: 10-26-D
- Numbers: ET&WNC 12; SC 12; TR 12
- Nicknames: Tweetsie
- Retired: 1949
- Restored: 1953
- Current owner: Tweetsie Railroad
- Disposition: Undergoing major overhaul
- East Tennessee and Western North Carolina 12
- U.S. National Register of Historic Places
- Location within North Carolina Location within the United States
- Location: Tweetsie Railroad Theme Park, Junction of Tweetsie Railroad Road and US 321, near Blowing Rock, North Carolina
- Coordinates: 36°10′14″N 81°38′51″W
- Area: Less than one acre
- Built: February 1917
- Built by: Baldwin Locomotive Works
- NRHP reference No.: 92000147
- Added to NRHP: March 12, 1992

East Tennessee and Western North Carolina Railroad 12, also known as Tweetsie Railroad 12, is a narrow-gauge 10-26-D class 4-6-0 "Ten-Wheeler" type steam locomotive, built in 1917 by the Baldwin Locomotive Works (BLW) for the East Tennessee and Western North Carolina Railroad (ET&WNC). It is preserved and operated by the Tweetsie Railroad (TR), located near Blowing Rock, North Carolina.

== History ==
No. 12 was built in February 1917 by the Baldwin Locomotive Works (BLW) for the East Tennessee and Western North Carolina Railroad (ET&WNC). The engine worked three decades on the ET&WNC hauling both freight and passenger trains during World War II, it was retired from revenue service in 1949 after thirty-two years of service. The ET&WNC ceased operations on July 13, 1950 and No. 12 was put into storage along with sister locomotives No. 9 and No. 11, both of which were later scrapped.

In 1952, it was sold along with two ET&WNC passenger cars to a group of railfans, Grattern Price Jr., Paul S. Hill and Wade W. Menefee Jr., the group moved the engine along with its passenger cars to a farm near Harrisonburg, Virginia for use in tourism on their newly constructed tourist line, named the Shenandoah Central Railroad (SC). It was restored to operating condition in 1953 and began running passenger trains on the line from Memorial Day weekend until October of that year, when the railroad's tracks suffered a washout during Hurricane Hazel; due to the major damage of the line, the Shenandoah Central Railroad would cease all tourist operations entirely and the engine would once again be put up for sale.

Cowboy actor and singer Gene Autry signed an option to purchase the locomotive and train cars for $17,000, with the intent to move them to California for use in motion pictures. However, Autry determined that the transportation and restoration costs made his plan impractical and decided to let his purchase option lapse.

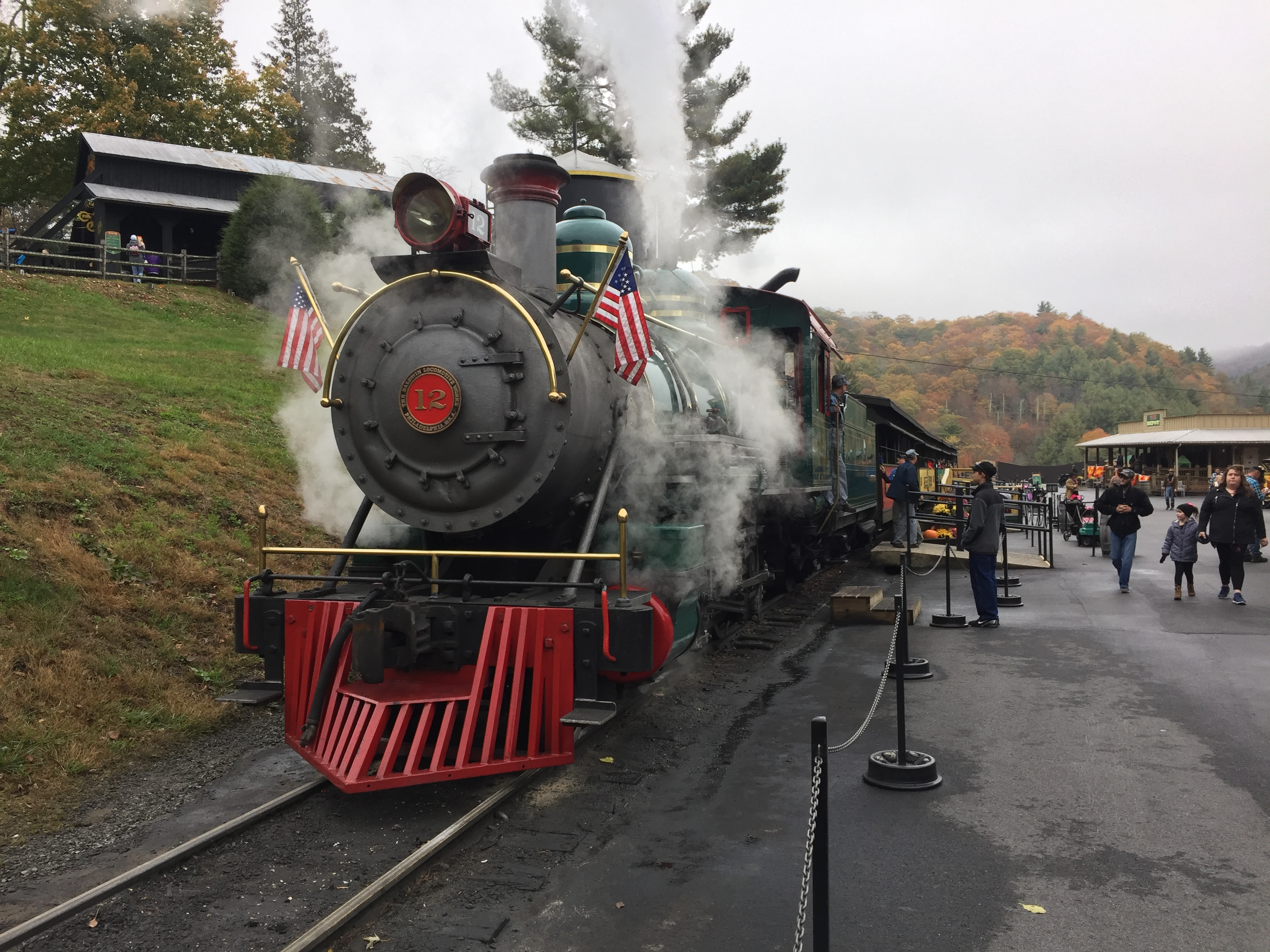
No. 12 loading passengers at the station, October 26, 2019

In 1955, it was eventually sold to Tweetsie Railroad (TR) founder Grover C. Robbins, Jr. The locomotive was repainted into Tweetsie Railroad lettering and on May 23, 1957, it was moved by truck up the mountains from Hickory to its new home near Blowing Rock. The theme park officially opened to the public on July 4 and No. 12 pulled its first train at the park that same day.

In February 1967, both No. 12 and No. 190 were remodified with diamond stacks and bright paint to make them look like the railroad took place in the wild west; the modifications were removed in the mid 1970s.

In 1992, No. 12 celebrated its 75th birthday and was backdated to its ET&WNC appearance. That same year, the locomotive was listed on the National Register of Historic Places.

On August 26-27, 2017, No. 12 ran a doubleheader special with former White Pass and Yukon Route 2-8-2 No. 190 in celebration of the park's 60th anniversary and for its 100th birthday. On August 17, 2024, No. 12 was taken out of service to undergo a major rebuild, it was expected to return to service again for the 2025 operating season, however as of 2026, overhaul work is still underway.

== See also ==
- Amusement rides on the National Register of Historic Places
