= White Pass and Yukon Route 70 =

Preserved narrow gauge 2-8-2 locomotive

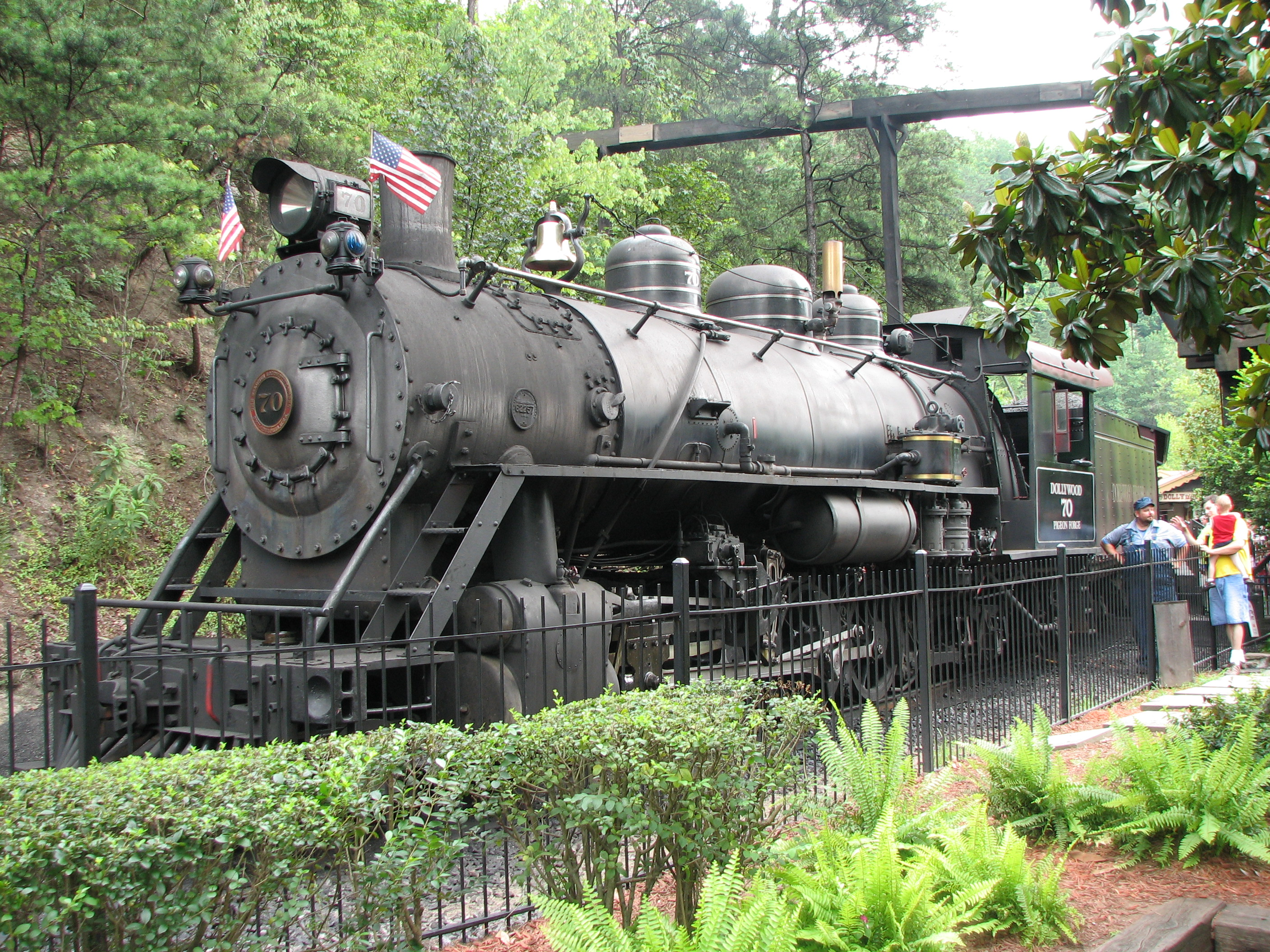
- No. 70 at the Dollywood Express station, August 12, 2007
Type and origin
- Power type: Steam
- Builder: Baldwin Locomotive Works
- Serial number: 62234
- Model: 12 28¼ E
- Build date: May 1938
Specifications
- Configuration
  - Whyte: 2-8-2
  - UIC: 1′D1′ h2
- Gauge: 3 ft (914 mm)
- Driver dia.: 44 in (1.118 m)
- Wheelbase: 55 ft 8 1/2 in (16.98 m)
- Height: 12 ft 7 in (3.84 m)
- Adhesive weight: 108,000 lb (49.0 t)
- Loco weight: 235,000 lb (106.6 t)
- Total weight: 43.25 lb (0.0 t)
- Fuel type: New: Coal; Now: Oil
- Fuel capacity: Coal: 8 t (7.9 long tons; 8.8 short tons); Oil: 2,500 US gal (9,500 L; 2,100 imp gal)
- Water cap.: 4,000 US gal (15,000 L; 3,300 imp gal)
- Firebox
  - Grate area: 36 sq ft (3.3 m^{2})
- Boiler: 64 in (1.63 m) diameter
- Boiler pressure: 205 psi (1.41 MPa)
- Heating surface
  - Firebox: 114 sq ft (10.6 m^{2})
  - Tubes: 993 sq ft (92.3 m^{2})
  - Flues: 555 sq ft (51.6 m^{2})
  - Total surface: 1,676 sq ft (155.7 m^{2})
- Cylinders: Two, outside
- Cylinder size: 17 in × 22 in (432 mm × 559 mm)
- Valve gear: Walschaerts
- Valve type: Piston valves
- Loco brake: Air
- Train brakes: Air
- Couplers: Knuckle
Performance figures
- Tractive effort: 25,179 lbf (112.0 kN)
- Factor of adh.: 4.24
Career
- Operators: White Pass and Yukon Route; United States Army Transportation Corps (leased); Dollywood Express
- Class: 12-28 ¼ E
- Number in class: 1st of 4
- Numbers: WPY 70; USATC 70; DE 70
- Nicknames: Cinderella
- Retired: April 1963
- Restored: 1987
- Current owner: Herschend Enterprises
- Disposition: Operational

White Pass and Yukon Route 70 is a narrow-gauge 2-8-2 "Mikado" type steam locomotive, built in 1938 by the Baldwin Locomotive Works (BLW). It is preserved and operated by the Dollywood Express (DE) at the Dollywood amusement theme park in Pigeon Forge, Tennessee.

== History ==
No. 70 was built in May 1938 by the Baldwin Locomotive Works (BLW) for the White Pass and Yukon Route (WPY). It was the first of the four 70-class locomotives that were constructed for the WPY between 1938 and 1947. (Note: Attributed to multiple sources:)

The engine worked hauling both freight and passenger trains until it was later assigned and leased to the United States Army Transportation Corps (USATC) to haul materials for the ALCAN highway and transport soldiers during World War II. It was originally built as a coal burner, but was later converted to burn oil in the 1950s.

The locomotive returned to the WPY after the war ended and it continued to haul freight and passenger trains until it was retired from revenue service in April 1963; the locomotive would be left on a sidetrack at the Skagway railyard for the next fourteen years.

In 1977, the WPY decided to sell No. 70 along with No. 71 and both units, along with some spare parts from No. 72, were sold to Silver Dollar City Tennessee (now Dollywood), a theme park in Pigeon Forge, Tennessee. It received a cosmetic restoration and placed on static display at the park.

In 1986, the railroad decided to return the engine to operating condition to help assist WPY No. 192 in excursion service. The engine was converted back to coal during its restoration and it was eventually returned to service in 1987, now proclaimed as Cinderella; since then, it has hauled excursion trains on the 5-mile track around the theme park.

On February 24, 2026, Dollywood officials announced that they would convert Nos. 70 and 192 back to burning oil instead of coal. This will enable them to run more in unfavorable conditions and to reduce maintenance and pollution. The converted engine returned to steam on March 13 for the opening of the park's 41st season.

== Accidents and incidents ==
- In 1940, 1951 and 1955, No. 70 was involved in three major accidents while working on the WPY, where it rolled over on its side three separate times. The locomotive would be repaired three separate times after the incidents and would continue service.
- On October 18, 2020, No. 70 was being prepped for service when a grease fire started on the side of the engine. The fire was put out quickly and without injuries.

== Bibliography ==
- Railway Carmen's Journal. Vol. 49–50. Brotherhood Railway Carmen of the United States and Canada. 1944. p. 226.
- "All-Time Roster of Locomotives: White Pass & Yukon Route". Railroad Magazine. 67–68. Frank A. Munsey Company: 69. 1955.
- Martin, Cy (1974). Gold Rush Narrow Gauge: The Story of the White Pass and Yukon Route. Trans-Anglo Books. p. 54, 64. ISBN 978-0-87-046026-5.
- Transport History. Vol. 10–11. Graphmitre Limited. 1979. p. 38.
- Clifford, Howard (1981). Rails North: The Railroads of Alaska and the Yukon. Superior Publishing Company. p. 47. ISBN 978-0875645360.
- National Railway Bulletin. Vol. 69. National Railway Historical Society. 2004. p. 30.
- Railroadman's Magazine. Vol. 89–90. 1971. p. 36.
- J. D. True (1987). Along the White Pass High Iron. Northbush Publications. ISBN 0-945284-00-4.
- J. David Conrad (1988). The Steam Locomotive Directory of North America. Vol. 1–2. Transportation Trails.
- True, J. D. (1994). It Happened on the White Pass: The Life and Times of a Narrow-Gauge Railway Engineer. Northbush Publications. ISBN 1-896079-02-4.
- Wilson, Graham (1998). The White Pass and Yukon Route Railway. Wolf Creek Books. ISBN 978-0-96-819552-9.
