= East Broad Top Railroad Mikado locomotives =

EBT Mikado locomotives

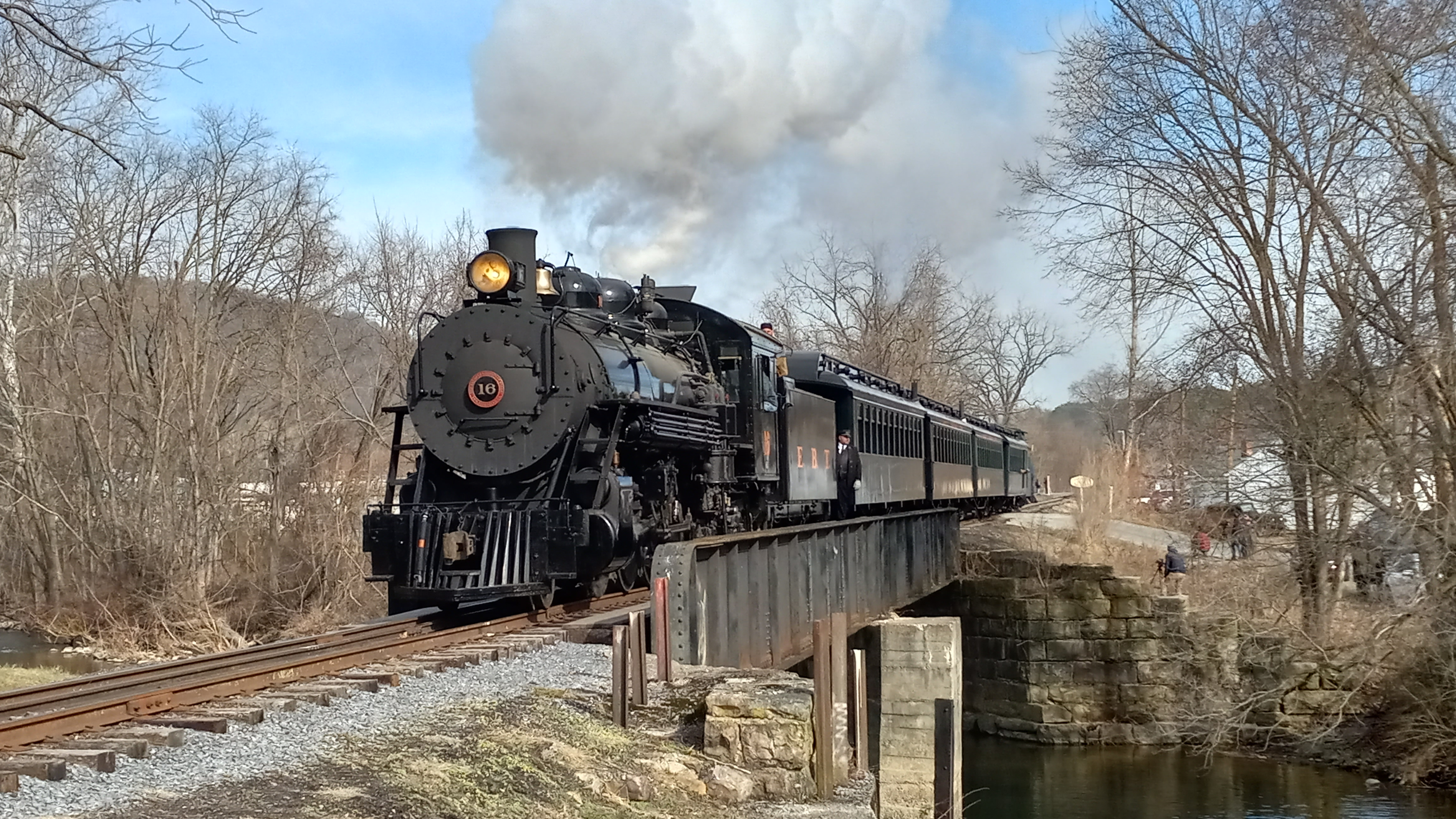
Restored East Broad Top Railroad 16 with an excursion train in 2023

The East Broad Top Railroad owns six three-foot gauge Mikado locomotives built by the Baldwin Locomotive Works. These engines original to the railroad have survived from their construction to the present day, with various members of the fleet having run in steam for excursion train service on the preserved route.

== History ==
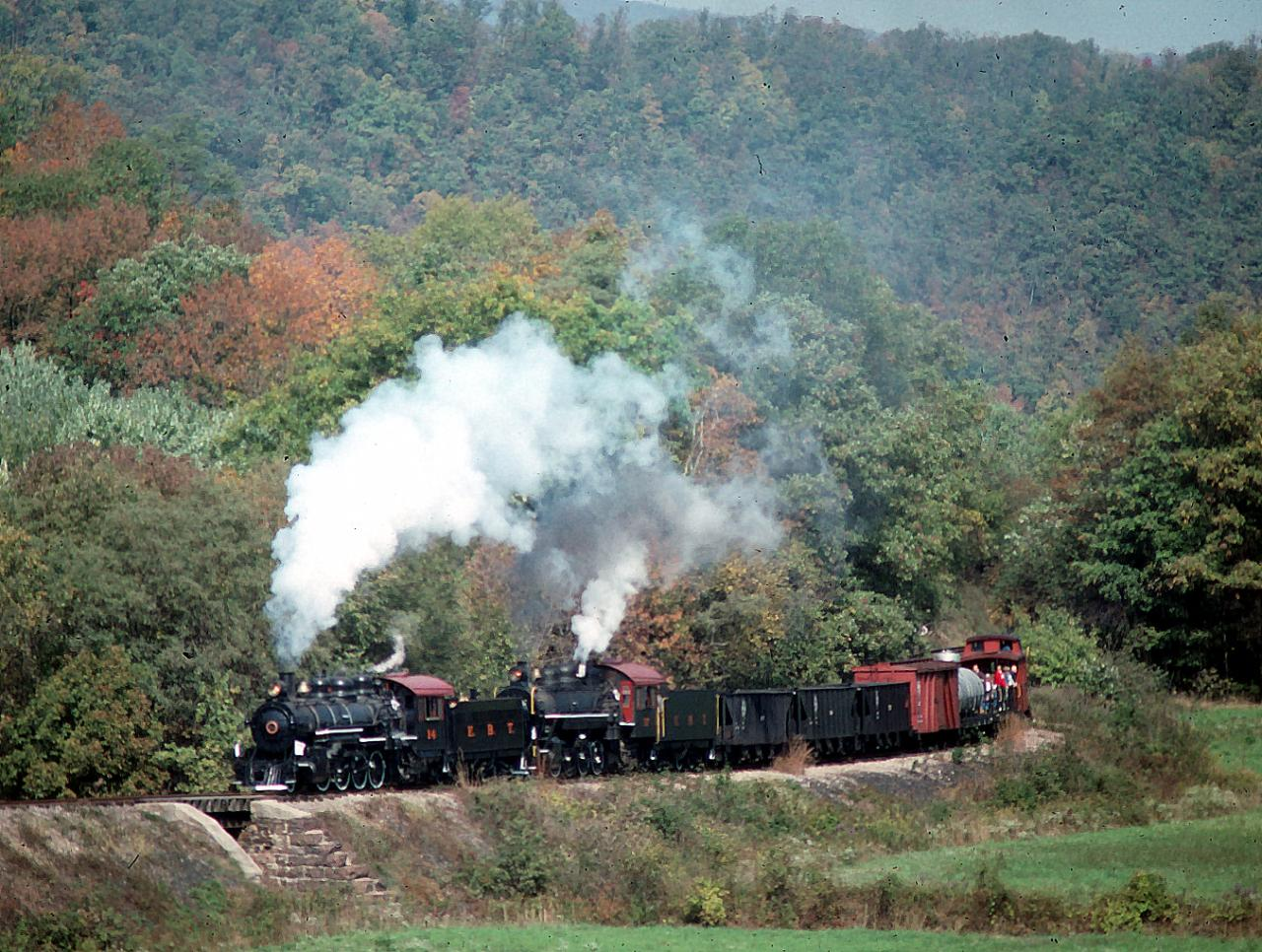
East Broad Top Railroad doubleheader with two Mikado locomotives, October 1987

Mikado locomotives provided the primary motive power of the East Broad Top's narrow gauge mainline from their initial delivery in the early 1910s until the railroad's abandonment in the 1950s. Predating the purchase of any Mikado engines, the East Broad Top had purchased a 2-6-2 Prairie engine (#11) in 1908 whose success encouraged the railroad to go larger with the following Mikado locomotives. The Mikado locomotives share several features to ensure smooth handling of heavy coal traffic, including double air brake pumps and two sand domes. The railroad began installing airbrakes on their equipment in 1913 along with new steel cars to operate alongside the growing Mikado fleet. Although the East Broad Top did briefly consider replacing the Mikado fleet with diesels, the line's abandonment and sale to Nick Kovalchick saved the historic steam locomotives with all six locomotives still preserved at the original East Broad Top's Rockhill Furnace shops.

Four of the engines would run in steam on and off again from the 1960s to 2011 during the East Broad Top's era of preservation under the Kovalchick family, with three of them (#12, #14, #15) already back in service by the early 1960s to haul excursion trains. The fourth engine to run in the Kovalchick era, #17 would return to steam in 1968. The locomotives provided the star attractions of the East Broad Top's Winter Spectaculars, until the Winter Spectacular runs were terminated in the 1980s due to the stress being placed on the locomotives and rolling stock. The explosion of Canadian Pacific 1278 at the Gettysburg Railroad in 1995 and the subsequent passage of stricter boiler safety laws caused financial strain for the East Broad Top to maintain their locomotive fleet. Only one locomotive would often be kept available for steam at a time from 1995 onto 2010, with #14 and then #15 being the primary locomotives to operate during this era (with #12 being retired in 2000 and #17 in the following year).

When the railroad shut down at the end of 2011, all of the engines were placed in storage from then until 2020 when the newly founded EBT Foundation Inc. bought the moribund railroad and began restoration work on locomotive #16. #16 returned to service in early 2023. The railroad has also begun preliminary work to potentially restore both #14 and #15 at a future date and inspected the other locomotives for restoration potential as well. The EBT Foundation Inc. has stated they desire to see all six locomotives someday restored to steam.

== 12-28 1/4 E-1 ==
12-28 1/4 E-1
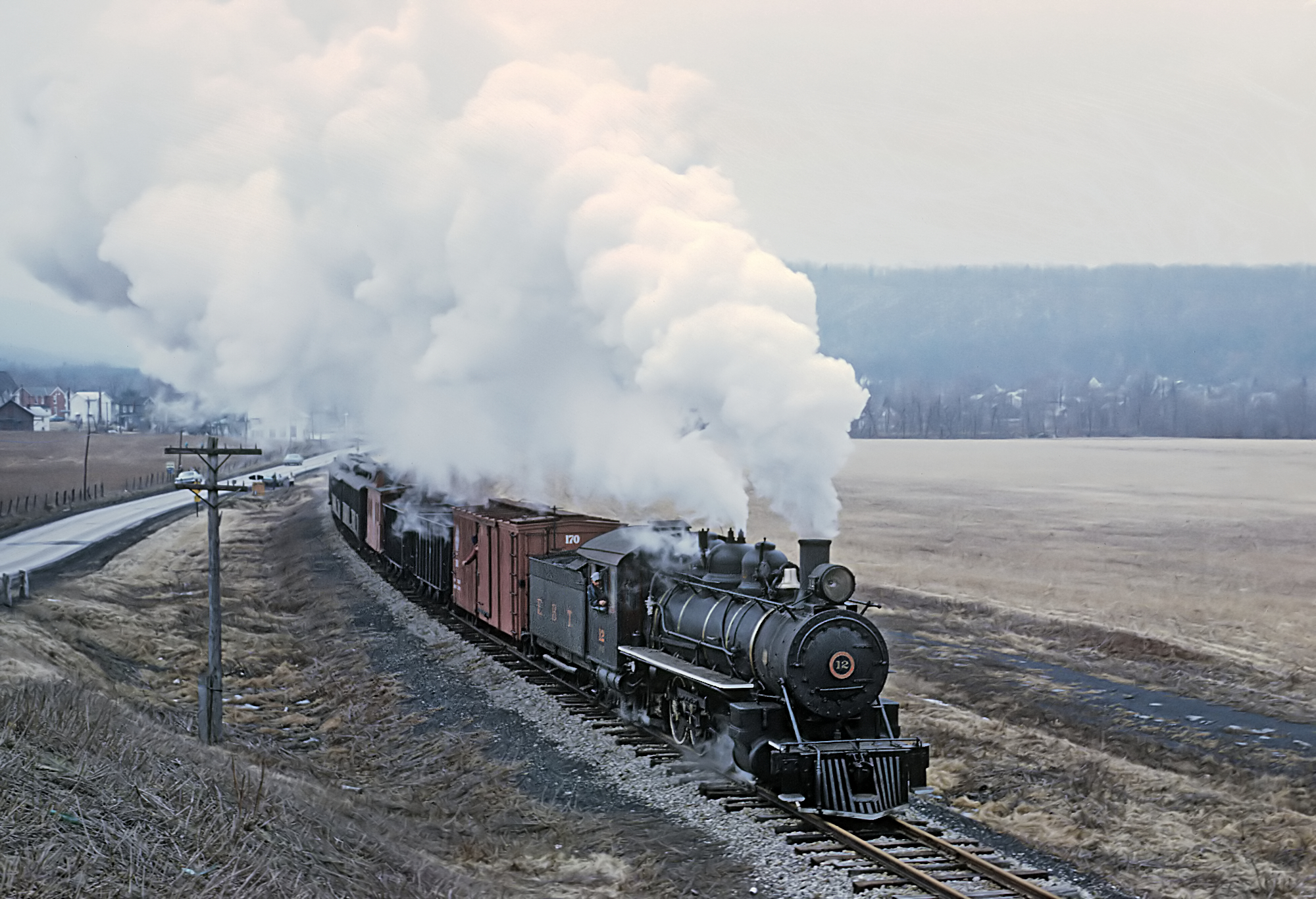
- No. 12 pulling a Railfan Special excursion in February 1969
Type and origin
- Power type: Steam
- Builder: Baldwin Locomotive Works
- Serial number: 37325
- Model: 12-28 1/4 E-1
- Build date: December 1911
- Total produced: 1
Specifications
- Configuration
  - Whyte: 2-8-2
- Gauge: 3 ft (914 mm)
- Driver dia.: 48 in (1,200 mm)
- Wheelbase: 13 ft (4.0 m)
  - Engine: 26.17 ft (7.98 m)
- Adhesive weight: 88,000 lb (40,000 kg)
- Total weight: 172,000 lb (78,000 kg)
- Fuel type: Coal
- Fuel capacity: 6 short tons (5.4 t; 5.4 long tons)
- Water cap.: 3,000 US gal (11,000 L; 2,500 imp gal)
- Boiler pressure: 180 psi (1,200 kPa)
- Heating surface: 1,686 sq ft (156.6 m^{2})
- Cylinders: Two, outside
- Cylinder size: 17 in × 24 in (430 mm × 610 mm) (bore × stroke)
- Valve gear: Walschaerts
- Valve type: Piston valves
- Train brakes: Air
- Couplers: Knuckle
Performance figures
- Tractive effort: 22,100 lbf (98 kN)
- Brakeforce: Air
Career
- Operators: East Broad Top Railroad and Coal Company
- Class: 12-28 ¼ E
- Numbers: 12
- Official name: Millie
- Current owner: EBT Foundation Inc.
- Disposition: Stored

East Broad Top #12 is the first Mikado locomotive built for the railroad in 1911. The new Mikado began the process of modernizing the East Broad Top locomotive fleet, replacing their aging roster of various locomotive types. The locomotive was designed to haul 15 loaded coal hoppers on the line. It derailed on its first run at Siding Hill Tunnel. Despite early problems, the engine proved successful and served as the template for the following five Mikados to come. The locomotive operated on a sporadic as needed basis from the late 1940s into the 1950s due to its light weight and lower power compared to its five larger successors.

The locomotive was named "Millie" in 1960 after then EBT owner Nick Kovalchick's daughter and was the first steam locomotive returned to service to operate the excursion line in 1960. The locomotive proved popular in the preservation era due to its smaller size and lighter weight which was believed to be easier on the track. #12 last operated in preservation in 2000 and has been stored since.

To celebrate the reopening of the railroad in the 2020s on August 13, 2020 Millie Kovalchick Glinsky (the namesake of #12); ceremonially smashed a bottle of grape juice over the pilot of the locomotive. Due to its heavy use in the early preservation era, #12 is considered mechanically worn and requires heavy work to return to service.

== 12-32 1/4 E-12 ==
12-32 1/4 E-12
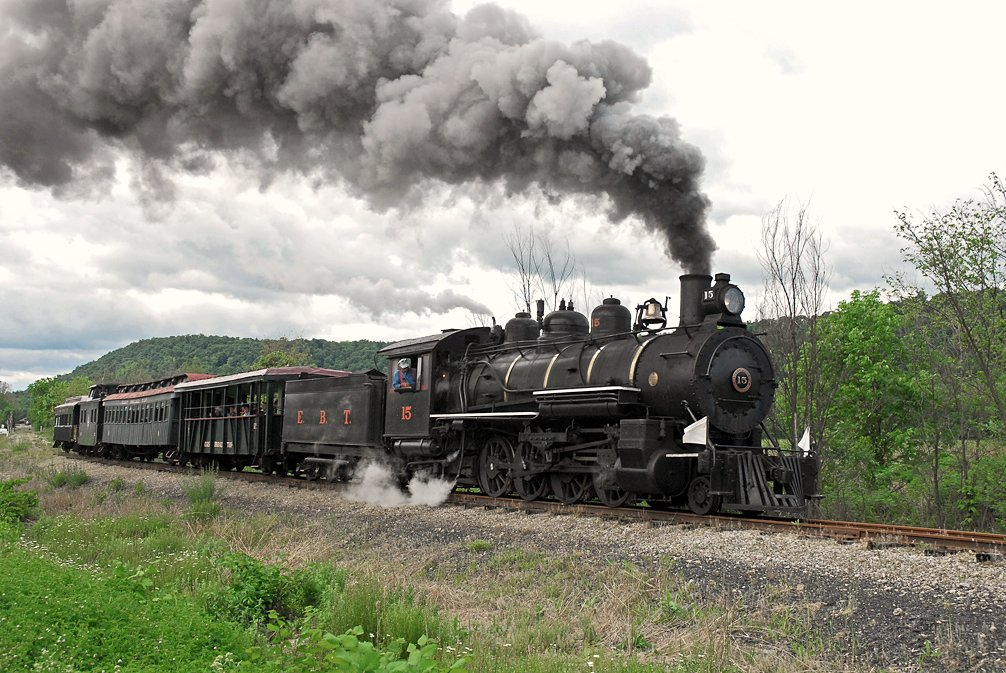
- No. 15 pulling an excursion in June 2006
Type and origin
- Power type: Steam
- Builder: Baldwin Locomotive Works
- Serial number: 14: 38625; 15: 41196
- Model: 12-32 1/4 E-12
- Build date: 14: 1912; 15: 1914
- Total produced: 2
Specifications
- Configuration
  - Whyte: 2-8-2
- Gauge: 3 ft (914 mm)
- Driver dia.: 48 in (1,200 mm)
- Adhesive weight: 124,000 lb (56,000 kg)
- Fuel type: Coal
- Fuel capacity: 7 short tons (6.4 t; 6.3 long tons)
- Water cap.: 4,000 US gal (15,000 L; 3,300 imp gal)
- Boiler pressure: 180 psi (1,200 kPa)
- Heating surface: 2,228 sq ft (207.0 m^{2})
- Cylinders: Two, outside
- Cylinder size: 19 in × 24 in (480 mm × 610 mm) (bore × stroke)
- Valve gear: Walschaerts
- Valve type: Slide valves
- Loco brake: Air
- Train brakes: Air
- Couplers: Knuckle
Performance figures
- Tractive effort: 14: 27,800 lbf (124 kN); 15: 29,400 lbf (131 kN)
Career
- Operators: East Broad Top Railroad and Coal Company
- Class: 12-32 ¼ E
- Numbers: 14 15
- Current owner: EBT Foundation Inc.
- Disposition: One under restoration, one stored

Built in 1912 and following up on the design of #12, #14 had increased tractive effort compared to its predecessor with the estimated ability of hauling 18 loaded hoppers from the coal mines along the East Broad Top. Despite #14 sequentially following #12, The East Broad Top skipped over the potential #13 roster spot and never owned a locomotive with that number. #15 would arrive two years later as a response to increased passenger demands while also sharing the same basic design as #14.

Locomotive #14 last operated in 2005. #15 ran in preservation from 2005 until 2011 when the East Broad Top was shut down, making #15 the last steam locomotive to run in the Kovalchick era. Both #15 and #14 have been inspected and partially disassembled after the railroad's revival in 2020 and are potential candidates for a full restoration after #16 is completed.

As of 2024, #15 is seen as the prime candidate to return to steam after the completion of #16, and is currently under restoration. #15 retains its boiler certification paperwork from the Federal Railroad Administration, however the engine requires extensive running gear repair before returning to service. #14 was considered for an early return to steam, but it was determined it would require more work to replace failing cast iron driving wheels on the locomotive with upgraded steel parts and the engine is as of 2024, planned to be third in line for restoration.

== 12-34 1/4 E Series ==
12-34 1/4 E-#
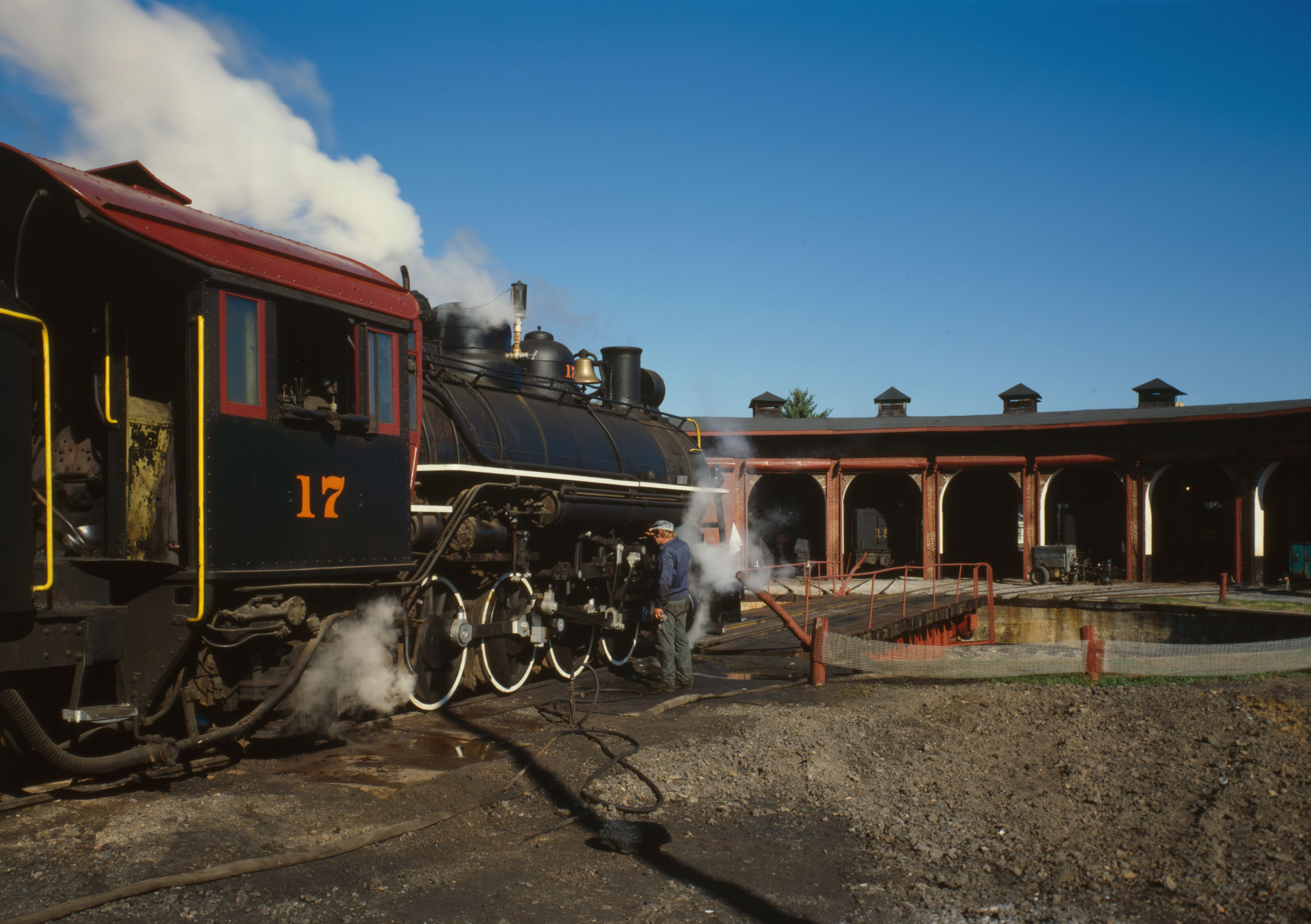
- No. 17 getting steamed up at the Rockhill roundhouse in 1986
Type and origin
- Power type: Steam
- Builder: Baldwin Locomotive Works
- Serial number: 16: 43562; 17: 48075; 18: 53541
- Model: 16: 12-34 1/4 E-41; 17: 12-34 1/4 E-47; 18: 12-34 1/4 E-57
- Build date: 16: 1916; 17: 1918; 18: 1920
- Total produced: 3
Specifications
- Configuration
  - Whyte: 2-8-2
- Gauge: 3 ft (914 mm)
- Driver dia.: 48 in (1,200 mm)
- Fuel type: Coal
- Fuel capacity: 7 short tons (6.4 t; 6.3 long tons)
- Water cap.: 4,000 US gal (15,000 L; 3,300 imp gal)
- Boiler pressure: 180 psi (1,200 kPa); 16 after 2023 rebuild: 200 psi (1,400 kPa)
- Heating surface: 2,485 sq ft (230.9 m^{2})
- Superheater
  - Heating area: 465 sq ft (43.2 m^{2})
- Cylinders: Two, outside
- Cylinder size: 20 in × 24 in (510 mm × 610 mm) (bore × stroke)
- Valve gear: Southern
- Valve type: Piston valves
- Loco brake: Air
- Train brakes: Air
- Couplers: Knuckle
Performance figures
- Tractive effort: 16: 34,000 lbf (150 kN)^{α} 17: 33,000 lbf (150 kN); 18: 34,500 lbf (153 kN)
Career
- Operators: East Broad Top Railroad and Coal Company
- Class: 12-34 ¼ E
- Numbers: 16, 17, 18
- Official name: Nick (16)
- Current owner: EBT Foundation Inc.
- Disposition: One operational, two stored

The final three Mikados were the largest locomotives on the East Broad Top roster. Unlike the previous EBT Mikados, these three locomotives used Southern valve gear and had boilers equipped with superheaters. The first of these Baldwin 12-34 1/4-E's (#16) arrived in 1916 with the final class member #18 delivered in 1920. It was estimated that these locomotives could handle 22 loaded hoppers, with reports of #16 once pulling a train of 60 empty hoppers.

At the time the East Broad Top shut down in 1956, #16 was undergoing an overhaul. During the first preservation era on the East Broad Top from the 1960s #16 and #18 were stored on property. #16 was considered for early restoration by the preserved railroad, but it is believed its boiler paperwork was destroyed by water damage from a leaking roof and the railroad chose to restore #14 instead. Locomotive #17 ran in excursion service on the preserved line from 1968 until 2001 as the only example of the class to steam in the Kovalchick era. General Manager of the railroad in the early 2020s Brad Esposito, has claimed regarding #17 and #18 that the original EBT "beat the snot out of them", due to being favored locomotives by the line during the latter years of freight traffic prior to preservation. In addition the boiler of #18 requires extensive repairs before it can be returned to service.

After reopening of the East Broad Top was announced in 2020, #16 was chosen as the first engine to be restored for steam service. The engine was found to require some boiler repair, new flues, repairs to the suspension, and the installation of a new mud ring. EBT restoration crews have relied heavily on partnerships with other experienced steam restoration crews such as the Strasburg Railroad and the contractor FMW Solutions to expedite the restoration of #16. Curry Rail Services was contracted to build a new welded tender tank for the locomotive. Appliances were swapped from the other stored EBT locomotives onto #16 to speed up the restoration process.

A FRA mandated hydrostatic test was conducted in May 2022 on #16's boiler. A steam test on the boiler was conducted in June 2022. After the steam test, work remained on the superheater, cab and boiler jacketing before the engine could return to service. By October 2022, boiler jacketing and paint work on the cab were completed for public display during the annual Friends of the East Broad Top Reunion.

In late January 2023, the East Broad Top Railroad began posting a series of teasers for the return of #16 to service on their Facebook page, including a video showing the shadow cast by the locomotive under steam on February 1, 2023. A second video posted later on the same day showed the locomotive in motion moving out onto the railroad's turntable, christened with the name "Nick" on the cab. Shortly after the locomotive's return to service plans were announced for the engine to headline the year's Winter Steam event and work as the primary excursion locomotive in the line's immediate future. The locomotive first ran for the public on excursions on February 18 later that year.

#16 would be taken out of service in early 2024, after discovering a cracked driver center during a regular inspection. At the end of August, #16 was returned to regular service after repairs and test runs were completed.

== Notes ==
^α Historical tractive effort value prior to boiler up pressuring to 200 PSI during 2023 restoration.
