= WBTV =

Television station in Charlotte, North Carolina

- Charlotte, North Carolina; United States
- Channels: Digital: 23 (UHF); Virtual: 3
- Branding: WBTV 3

Programming
- Affiliations: 3.1: CBS; for others, see § Technical information and subchannels

Ownership
- Owner: Gray Media; (Gray Television Licensee, LLC)

History
- First air date: July 15, 1949
- Former call signs: WBT-TV (1949; before sign-on)
- Former channel numbers: Analog: 3 (VHF, 1949–2009)
- Former affiliations: All secondary: NBC (1949–1957); ABC (1949–1967); DuMont (1949–1955)
- Call sign meaning: derived from WBT radio, with "V" for "Vision" added

Technical information
- Licensing authority: FCC
- Facility ID: 30826
- ERP: 1,000 kW
- HAAT: 565 m (1,854 ft)
- Transmitter coordinates: 35°21′51″N 81°11′12″W

Links
- Public license information: Public file; LMS
- Website: www.wbtv.com

WBTV (channel 3) is a television station in Charlotte, North Carolina, United States, affiliated with CBS and owned by Gray Media. The station's studios are located off Morehead Street, just west of Uptown Charlotte, and its transmitter is located in north-central Gaston County. In addition, WBTV's studios continue to house the operations of its former sister radio stations currently owned by Urban One: WBT (AM) and WBT-FM, as well as WFNZ, which was previously owned by CBS Radio prior to its acquisition by Beasley Broadcast Group in 2014, followed by Entercom (now known as Audacy) in late 2017 and then Urban One in 2020 under a local marketing agreement.

== History ==
The station first signed on the air on July 15, 1949. When it debuted, WBTV was the 13th television station in the United States and the first in the Carolinas; it is the oldest television station located between Richmond and Atlanta. Veteran Charlotte broadcaster Jim Patterson was the first person seen on the station, and remained employed there until his death in 1986. WBTV was originally owned by the Greensboro-based Jefferson Standard Life Insurance Company, then-owners of WBT (1110 AM), the city's oldest radio station and the first fully licensed station in the South. At the time, the Jefferson Standard Life Insurance Company also had a 16.5% interest in the Greensboro News Company, licensee of WFMY-TV, which signed on from Greensboro two months after WBTV. Jefferson Standard had purchased WBT from CBS in 1947. Shortly before the television station went on the air, its call letters were modified from WBT-TV to WBTV. Jefferson Standard merged with Pilot Life in 1968 (although it had owned controlling interest since 1945) and became Jefferson-Pilot Corporation. In 1970, the media interests were folded into a new subsidiary, Jefferson-Pilot Communications.

WBTV received one of the last construction permits issued before the Federal Communications Commission's (FCC) "freeze" on new television licenses, which lasted until the Commission released its Sixth Report and Order in 1952. As such, it was Charlotte's only VHF station for eight years, carrying affiliations with all four major networks of the time—CBS, NBC, ABC and DuMont. However, WBTV has always been a primary CBS affiliate, owing to WBT radio's long affiliation with the CBS Radio Network. It is the only commercial television station in the market that has never changed its primary affiliation.

Channel 3 had originally operated from a converted radio studio in the Wilder Building, alongside its sister radio station. In 1955, WBT and WBTV moved to a then state-of-the-art facility on a hill atop Morehead Street, where both stations are still based today. The studio address, One Julian Price Place, is named in honor of the executive who effectively founded Jefferson Standard/Jefferson-Pilot through an early-20th century merger.

WBTV's only competition in its early years came from a UHF station on channel 36, known as WAYS-TV and then WQMC-TV, which broadcast briefly from 1953 to 1955. It was nominally an NBC affiliate, sharing a secondary ABC affiliation with channel 3. However, channel 36's signal was severely weak, and NBC continued to allow WBTV to cherry-pick its stronger programming. Channel 36 went dark in March 1955, and DuMont shut down roughly a year later in August 1956. Channel 3 took on secondary affiliations with NBC and ABC until Charlotte's second VHF station, WSOC-TV (channel 9), took the NBC affiliation when it signed on in April 1957. Channel 36 returned to the air in November 1964 as WCCB (later moving to channel 18 in November 1966), carrying whatever CBS programs that WBTV turned down in order to carry ABC programs. ABC programming continued to be split among the three stations until 1967, when WCCB became a full-time ABC affiliate.

WBTV's broadcast tower in north-central Gaston County.

From 1958 to 1974, WBTV's studio facilities served as the home for Mid-Atlantic Championship Wrestling telecasts. Since its completion in 1984, WBTV's signal has been transmitted from a 2,000-foot (610 m)-high guy-wired aerial mast transmitter tower located in north-central Gaston County, North Carolina, which is also shared with former radio sister WLNK.

When WAGA-TV in Atlanta, which signed on the air four months before WBTV, switched to Fox in December 1994, WBTV became the longest-tenured CBS affiliate located south of Washington, D.C. from that point forward. WFMY-TV in Greensboro, the second-oldest station in the Carolinas, is the network's second-longest tenured affiliate south of the nation's capital; it signed on three months after WBTV. Two years later, after KPIX-TV in San Francisco became a CBS owned-and-operated station (due to owner Westinghouse Electric Corporation's merger with CBS), WBTV became the second longest-tenured affiliate that was not owned by the network, behind only Washington's WUSA.

Jefferson Standard/Jefferson-Pilot acquired several other radio and television stations across the country, with WBTV serving as the company's flagship station. The first was WBTW in Florence, South Carolina, which was built and signed on in 1954; indeed, the call letters were chosen specifically because "W" is the next letter in the alphabet after "V". The two stations were separately programmed, but shared a microwave system from 1959 onward. Jefferson-Pilot sold WBTW in 1968 because WBTW provided a fairly strong grade B signal to the eastern portion of the Charlotte market, and neither station would have been able to expand their signals as long as Jefferson-Pilot owned both of them.

In 2006, Jefferson-Pilot merged with the Philadelphia-based Lincoln National Corporation. Lincoln Financial retained Jefferson-Pilot's broadcasting division, which was renamed Lincoln Financial Media, with WBTV retaining its status as the flagship station.

=== Sale to Raycom Media ===
On November 12, 2007, Lincoln Financial announced its intention to sell WBTV, sister stations WWBT in Richmond and WCSC-TV in Charleston, South Carolina, and Lincoln Financial Sports, to Raycom Media for $583 million. Lincoln Financial also sold its Charlotte radio stations to Braintree, Massachusetts–based Greater Media, effectively breaking up Charlotte's last co-owned radio/television station combination. According to Charlotte Observer TV critic Mark Washburn, Lincoln Financial decided soon after taking over the former Jefferson-Pilot properties that it would never really be able to integrate them with the rest of the company's assets, and had decided to sell them as soon as possible. The sale of the radio stations was finalized on January 31, 2008.

The FCC approved the sale of WBTV on March 25, 2008, and Raycom formally took control of the station on April 1. With the purchase, WBTV became Raycom's second-largest station by market size, behind the Cleveland, Ohio duopoly of WOIO and WUAB. Since Raycom Sports is headquartered in Charlotte, WBTV had a very important role in Raycom Media's operations, and it shared its flagship status with NBC affiliate WSFA, located in the company's homebase of Montgomery, Alabama.

In early 2008, Raycom Sports and Lincoln Financial Sports officially merged under the Raycom Sports banner. The merger coincided with the start of the 2008 Atlantic Coast Conference basketball season. WBTV had been Charlotte's home station for ACC sporting events since C. D. Chesley piped in North Carolina's historic win in the 1957 NCAA tournament to channel 3 and several other television stations in the state. Raycom had produced ACC basketball games in partnership with Jefferson-Pilot/Lincoln Financial since 1982. The partnership was extended to football in 2004; Jefferson-Pilot/Lincoln Financial had been the sole producer of ACC football telecasts since 1984. From 2010 onward, the package was branded as the ACC Network.

In mid-May 2008, the former Jefferson-Pilot/Lincoln Financial stations launched redesigned websites, powered by the Local Media network division of WorldNow (which operates nearly all of the websites of Raycom's stations), assuming web platform operations from Broadcast Interactive Media. However, WBTV and WWBT retained their Jefferson-Pilot/Lincoln Financial-era logos and branding (WCSC has since changed its logo and graphics, following its switch to high definition newscasts). WBTV changed its logo, in use since 2001, on September 7, 2023. The new logo incorporates the "GrayONE" graphics package used by most Gray stations.

Former logo used from 2001 to 2023

On November 15, 2013, both WBTV and WBT were dedicated with a North Carolina historical marker at the corner of Tryon and Third Streets (reading "WBT/WBTV – Oldest broadcast stations in North Carolina established 1922. WBT radio long hosted live country music. WBTV sign-on, July 15, 1949. Studios here until 1955"). The Wilder Building, which was demolished in 1983, served as WBTV's studio facilities from 1949 to 1955.

=== Sale to Gray Television ===
On June 25, 2018, Atlanta-based Gray Television announced it had reached an agreement with Raycom to merge their respective broadcasting assets (consisting of Raycom's 63 existing owned-and/or-operated television stations, including WBTV), and Gray's 93 television stations) under Gray's corporate umbrella. The cash-and-stock merger transaction valued at $3.6 billion—in which Gray shareholders would acquire preferred stock currently held by Raycom—resulted in WBTV gaining new in-state sister stations, including NBC affiliates WECT in Wilmington and WITN-TV in the Washington–Greenville market, in addition to its current Raycom sister stations. The sale was approved on December 20, and was completed on January 2, 2019. As was the case with Raycom, WBTV became Gray's second-largest station by market size, after Cleveland's WOIO/WUAB. Since Gray acquired WAGA's successor as Atlanta's CBS affiliate, WGCL-TV (now WANF) as its flagship, WBTV has been Gray's third-largest station.

=== 2022 helicopter crash ===
On November 22, 2022, at 11:57 a.m., a 1999 Robinson R44 helicopter nicknamed "WBTV Sky3" crashed onto the grass verge of I-77 in south Charlotte during a training exercise. Both occupants, WBTV pilot Chip Tayag and WBTV meteorologist Jason Myers, were pronounced dead at the scene. WBTV anchors Molly Grantham and Jamie Boll covered the incident live on the air, before receiving confirmation it was their own station's helicopter and crewmen involved in the crash; the station released a statement citing the incident as a "terrible loss" to the WBTV family. WBTV received an immediate outpouring of support from the community, sister stations, and other media outlets; Governor Roy Cooper and Pastor Franklin Graham posted condolences on social media, and the Carolina Panthers and Charlotte FC delayed their 2022 Christmas tree lighting ceremony at Bank of America Stadium for a moment of silence in honor of Tayag and Myers.

Witnesses to the crash claim the helicopter was visibly faltering, and in a steeply-banked spiral as it came down. Witnesses also claim that Tayag, a pilot with over 20 years of experience, deliberately steered the falling helicopter into the grass to avoid crashing into nearby buildings or onto the Interstate itself, which was crowded with Thanksgiving week traffic at the time. The FAA and NTSB began an investigation into the incident; the preliminary findings of this investigation, coupled with the available RadarBox data, indicated that the helicopter was initially traveling at 80 mph (129 km/h), and made three 360-degree turns just before it crashed. Tayag, the pilot, never issued any distress signal, though he was in contact with CLT air traffic control moments before the crash. A further NTSB report released May 2, 2024, stated "inadequate inspections" did not reveal loose parts; these likely caused a loss of control, leading to the crash.

On March 6, 2023, the family of Jason Myers filed a wrongful death lawsuit against Wilson Air Center in North Carolina; this lawsuit was later expanded to include a claim of negligence against Total Traffic and Weather Network and iHeartMedia, who employed Chip Tayag and were responsible for the maintenance of the helicopter. The lawsuit alleged that the helicopter was poorly maintained, leading to the crash. That case was dismissed but a trial for helicopter owner TTWN and iHeartMedia was planned for 2025. Tayag's wife filed her own suit in November 2024 against Robinson Helicopter Company, alleging the company knew about problems with its helicopters. Ruling on the 2023 suit on September 18, 2025, Judge Forrest Bridges approved a $50 million settlement to be paid by TTWN and iHeartMedia.

== Programming ==
For many years, WBTV was one of the country's most dominant television stations. This was in part due to being the only reliably viewable station in town for nine years, as well as the station's long tradition of strong local news coverage. In fact, its dominance was so absolute that it was once said the dials of most Charlotteans' television sets were "rusted on channel 3". To this day, WBTV has been one of CBS' strongest affiliates.

The station claims credit for a number of television "firsts", among them being the construction of the first building in the United States built specifically for color television broadcasting. WBTV also claims to have been the first station in the world to record and rebroadcast programs on color videotape; to use a live camera and microwave relay inside a race car; and to have a fully computerized news operation. It claims to have been the first station in the country to develop computerized election return projections, to broadcast CBS' ExtraVision teletext service, and to produce a local newscast for a PBS member station (WTVI, channel 42). It claims to be the first station in the Southern U.S. to air color test patterns and color ID slides. WBTV was granted the first full-power construction permit for a digital television signal in the United States in 1998, which went on the air that year operating at 1 million watts–equivalent to 5 million watts for an analog transmitter.

A much-remembered women's/homemaker's show, The Betty Feezor Show, aired on channel 3 from the 1950s until 1977 (usually after the soap opera Search for Tomorrow, and in its 15-minute format, Guiding Light). Feezor gave viewers tips on cooking, sewing, floral arranging, and other topics of interest to housewives and mothers. In 1965, the show was the third most-watched women's program in the United States. The show was the first to be videotaped in color starting September 5, 1958. Feezor's show was also carried on Richmond sister station WWBT after Jefferson-Pilot bought the station in 1968. Feezor retired in 1977 due to a brain tumor, an illness from which she died in 1978.

The Betty Feezor Show was replaced by an hour-long midday news and variety show, Top O' the Day. Segments on the program included On the Square, in which Doug Mayes solicited opinions from various Charlotte-area residents about current news topics, as well as C. J. Underwood's Down Home with the Carolina Camera, where otherwise unknown or low-profile Carolinians were temporarily given celebrity status for their whimsical talents, novel collections, or for the way they impacted their communities. For its first five years, the show aired at noon, preempting The Young and the Restless. It shifted to 11:30 a.m. in 1982. To make room for Top O' the Day, WBTV aired The Price Is Right on a one-day delay at 10:30 a.m., preempting whatever game show CBS aired at that time. As a result, Child's Play, Press Your Luck, Card Sharks, and Now You See It never aired in Charlotte. The station did not air the CBS version of Wheel of Fortune until late in that show's run. Top O' the Day ended in 1992, and was replaced by a conventional half-hour noon newscast. For most of the 1980s, WBTV aired the CBS Evening News on a half-hour delay at 7 p.m., due to its 6 p.m. newscast lasting an hour.

For many years, WBTV occasionally preempted some of CBS' Saturday morning cartoons as well. However, area viewers could watch those preempted shows on WSPA-TV in Spartanburg or WFMY through a strong antenna (WFMY and WSPA were and still are available on some cable systems in the Charlotte market, although non-local programming is subject to blackout due to network non-duplication and syndication exclusivity rules). Before the arrival of the Carolina Panthers, WSPA was also known to air a different NFL game than what aired on WBTV, giving most Charlotte-area viewers a second option for NFL games. This was especially true if the Washington Redskins and Atlanta Falcons played at the same time. WBTV favored the Redskins while WSPA favored the Falcons, in tandem with most CBS affiliates in their respective states.

Since the early 1990s, WBTV has generally cleared most of the CBS programming schedule in pattern, with the exception of ACC football and basketball games from Raycom Sports. For many years, WBTV aired Face the Nation on Sundays at 11:30 a.m.; most CBS affiliates in the Eastern Time Zone air it at 10:30 a.m. However, when Face the Nation was permanently expanded to an hour in 2012, WBTV moved the show to 10:30 a.m.

WBTV gained a major ratings windfall in 1981–82, when CBS won the television rights to the NCAA men's basketball tournament. Due to North Carolina's status as a college basketball hotbed and local teams North Carolina and Duke being mainstays in the tournament, NCAA tournament games are consistently among the highest-rated programs in the market during playoff season. In 2008, for instance, NCAA games on WBTV attracted a 13.4 rating and a 24 share, the third-highest in the nation (behind only WLKY-TV in Louisville and WREG-TV in Memphis).

The popularity of a series of specials commemorating the station's 25th anniversary in 1974 led to a long-running program, Those Were the Years, hosted by Mike McKay and featuring episodes of classic television shows such as Dragnet, You Bet Your Life and Alfred Hitchcock Presents. It was seen for several years at 11:30 p.m. on Fridays, preempting the CBS late-night shows which competed poorly against The Tonight Show.

Throughout the 1960s and 1970s, WBTV aired a Sunday morning program that featured singing cowboy Fred Kirby and his sidekick "Uncle Jim" (played by Jim Patterson). The show was known at various times as Tiny Town, Whistle Stop, Fred Kirby's Little Rascals and Kirby's Corral. Giving the "hi-sign" to his young fans, Kirby was a fixture for many years at the western-themed park Tweetsie Railroad in Blowing Rock (an hour northwest of Charlotte). In addition to Fred and Uncle Jim, viewers were treated to classic episodes of The Little Rascals (Hal Roach's Our Gang) as well as frequent appearances by the local bluegrass band The Br'arhoppers. Patterson was killed in a single-car accident in Charlotte in 1986; Kirby died in 1996 at age 85.

=== Sports programming ===
From 1982 to 2019, WBTV was the flagship station of syndicated over-the-air coverage of Atlantic Coast Conference sports. Then-owner Jefferson-Pilot took over coverage of men's basketball from longtime producer C. D. Chesley in 1982 in partnership with Raycom, and became the sole producer of ACC football in 1984. Those rights passed to Lincoln Financial after its merger with Jefferson-Pilot in 2006. Both have been produced by Raycom Sports after their acquisition of Lincoln Financial's sports division during the 2007–2008 season. Most ACC games that were not televised by WBTV aired on either WJZY (channel 46) or WMYT-TV (channel 55). Raycom Sports has rights to the ACC until at least the 2026–27 season. The ACC syndication package moved to cable's ACC Network in 2019.

WBTV provided local coverage of the 1994 NCAA Men's Final Four, which was held at the now-demolished Charlotte Coliseum.

WBTV also airs any Panthers games carried on CBS' NFL package. The station airs at least two games a year, typically when the team plays host to an AFC opponent at Bank of America Stadium; starting in 2014, through the NFL's new "cross-flex" broadcast rules, games that would normally air on Fox (locally on WJZY) can be moved arbitrarily to CBS and vice versa. WBTV also aired both of the Panthers' Super Bowl appearances locally, as CBS had the rights to Super Bowls XXXVIII and 50.

=== News operation ===
WBTV presently broadcasts 38 1/2 hours of locally produced newscasts each week (with 6 1/2 hours each weekday, four hours on Saturdays and two hours on Sundays).

For most of its first 30 years on the air, WBTV's newscasts dominated the Nielsen ratings in the Charlotte market. In addition to its legacy as the state's first television station, it also benefited from its ties to WBT, one of the most respected radio news operations in the Southeastern United States. Channel 3 did not face a serious challenge by any other news-producing station in the market until 1981. That year, Doug Mayes, the station's main anchorman since it began producing daily newscasts in 1952, jumped to WSOC-TV. Mayes said years later that channel 9 offered him a deal that was too lucrative for him to resist, considering that he had kids in college. Jefferson-Pilot management, who only a few years earlier had touted Mayes as part of the station's campaign, "Turn to People You Know", wanted to make its newscasts appeal to a younger audience and made little effort to retain him. Within a few months, WBTV's late-evening newscast lost the lead at 11 p.m. to channel 9, and it would not regain first place in that timeslot until 2004. WSOC-TV gained a large lead in ratings for most other news timeslots beginning in 1990. WBTV returned to a strong position in the late 1990s, culminating in wrestling the #1 spot at noon in 1998 from WSOC-TV. The two stations have gone back and forth at first place in most timeslots since then. During the July 2013 ratings period, WBTV took the lead at noon and 11 p.m., while WSOC led at all other news timeslots. Soon after Raycom took control of the station, WBTV began airing local newscasts and CBS programs in high definition. During the 2016 February sweeps, WBTV surged to first place in all timeslots, including the 6 and 11 p.m. newscasts, for the first time in 26 years. WBTV credited its strong social media presence and its talent continuity for the ratings win, while WSOC lost much of its main talent in the previous year. Historically, WBTV has dominated the market west of the Catawba River, a legacy from its nine-year head start. WBTV's lead would not last, as in 2023, the station came in second in several key timeslots, behind WSOC-TV.

Diana Williams (later at WABC-TV in New York City; now retired) served as an anchor at WBTV during the early 1980s; she was succeeded as the station's main female anchor by Sara James (now a reporter for Dateline NBC). Following the 2005 retirement of longtime WSOC anchorman Bill Walker, WBTV began billing lead anchorman Paul Cameron as "The Voice of Experience". Cameron joined WBTV in 1981 as the station's sports director, and then succeeded longtime anchor Bob Inman upon his retirement in 1996. He was only the third main anchor in the station's history, following Mayes and Inman. Cameron served as the station's top male anchor until his retirement on December 31, 2018.

Prior to joining in 2004, evening anchor Maureen O'Boyle, a Charlotte native and graduate of West Charlotte High School, served as anchor of the syndicated newsmagazines A Current Affair and Extra. Morning and midday anchor John Carter formerly served as a North Carolina state senator prior to joining the station. Other notable on-air personalities include Western bureau chief Steve Ohnesorge, who started as a photographer at WBTV in 1975.

In 1994, WBTV entered into a news share agreement to produce a 10 p.m. newscast for then-independent station WJZY; the newscast later moved to PBS member station WTVI, before returning to WJZY in 2003 and then to that station's duopoly partner, MyNetworkTV affiliate WMYT-TV in April 2012. Following Fox's purchase of WJZY and WMYT, the WBTV-produced newscast returned to WJZY when it became the market's Fox owned-and-operated station on July 1, 2013, which continued to air until the station launched its own news department (and hour-long 10 p.m. newscast) on January 1, 2014. It placed third among local newscasts during the July 2013 ratings period, behind the WSOC-produced newscast on WAXN, and WCCB's in-house newscast.

In September 2010, WBTV debuted an hour-long 4 p.m. newscast, which competes with what at the time was a half-hour newscast (which has since expanded to one hour) on WCNC-TV. On January 22, 2014, WBTV began producing a two-hour extension of its weekday morning newscast, airing from 7 to 9 a.m. as well as an hour-long prime time newscast at 8 p.m. for WBTV-DT2. The morning newscast ended in spring 2018, and the 8 p.m. newscast ended on August 17, 2018.

Since 2008, WBTV has partnered with its sister stations in South Carolina—WCSC, WIS in Columbia and WMBF-TV in Myrtle Beach and WHNS in Greenville—to cover stories in South Carolina. Between them, the five stations cover almost all of South Carolina. It is the second time that WBTV has had a sister station in the Florence/Myrtle Beach market; as mentioned above, Jefferson-Pilot was the founding owner of WBTW from 1954 to 1968.

==== Notable former on-air staff ====
- Shannon Bream – anchor
- Rita Cosby
- Steve Crump - reporter and documentary film producer
- Jan Jeffcoat – anchor
- Fred Kirby – performer and host of children's programming
- Michael Marsh
- Loonis McGlohon – music director, jazz pianist and composer
- Maureen O'Boyle – anchor
- Lori Stokes – anchor (1988–1990)
- Diana Williams – anchor (1983–1986)

== Technical information and subchannels ==
WBTV's transmitter is located in north-central Gaston County. The station's signal is multiplexed:

Subchannels of WBTV
Channel	Res.	Short name	Programming
3.1	1080i	WBTV-DT	CBS
3.2	480i	Bounce	Bounce TV
3.3	480i	The365	365BLK
3.4	480i	IONPlus	Ion Plus
3.5	480i	Oxygen	Oxygen
64.1	720p	WAXN-TV	WAXN-TV (Independent)

Broadcast on behalf of another station

WBTV had previously carried a standard-definition simulcast of the station's main channel on its second digital subchannel. On July 12, 2010, the simulcast was replaced with This TV. WBTV's weather radar was previously shown on its third subchannel, but the subchannel itself was removed prior to the digital transition. The third subchannel resumed operations upon the launch of Bounce TV on September 26, 2011. On January 1, 2012, WBTV switched the subchannels for This TV and Bounce TV, due to a contractual obligation to carry Bounce TV on the station's second subchannel. On April 1, 2012, This TV was dropped and the third subchannel was once again removed to make room for WBTV's mobile DTV service, but was brought back on October 8, 2014, with the Grit network. On January 1, 2020, Circle, a country music and lifestyle channel was launched and added as a fourth subchannel at 3.3, moving Grit to subchannel 3.4.

=== Analog-to-digital conversion ===
WBTV shut down its analog signal, over VHF channel 3, on June 12, 2009, the official date on which full-power television stations in the United States transitioned from analog to digital broadcasts under federal mandate. The station's digital signal remained on its pre-transition UHF channel 23, using virtual channel 3.

=== NextGen TV ===
WBTV upgraded to ATSC 3.0 on July 7, 2021.

== Out-of-market cable carriage ==
In recent years, WBTV has been carried on cable in several areas outside of the Charlotte television market, including cable systems within the adjacent Greensboro–Winston-Salem–High Point and Asheville markets in North Carolina and South Carolina, and the Tri-Cities market in Tennessee and Virginia.

== See also ==
- Channel 23 digital TV stations in the United States
- Channel 3 virtual TV stations in the United States
