= USATC S118 Class =

Class of 2-8-2 steam locomotive

USATC S118 class
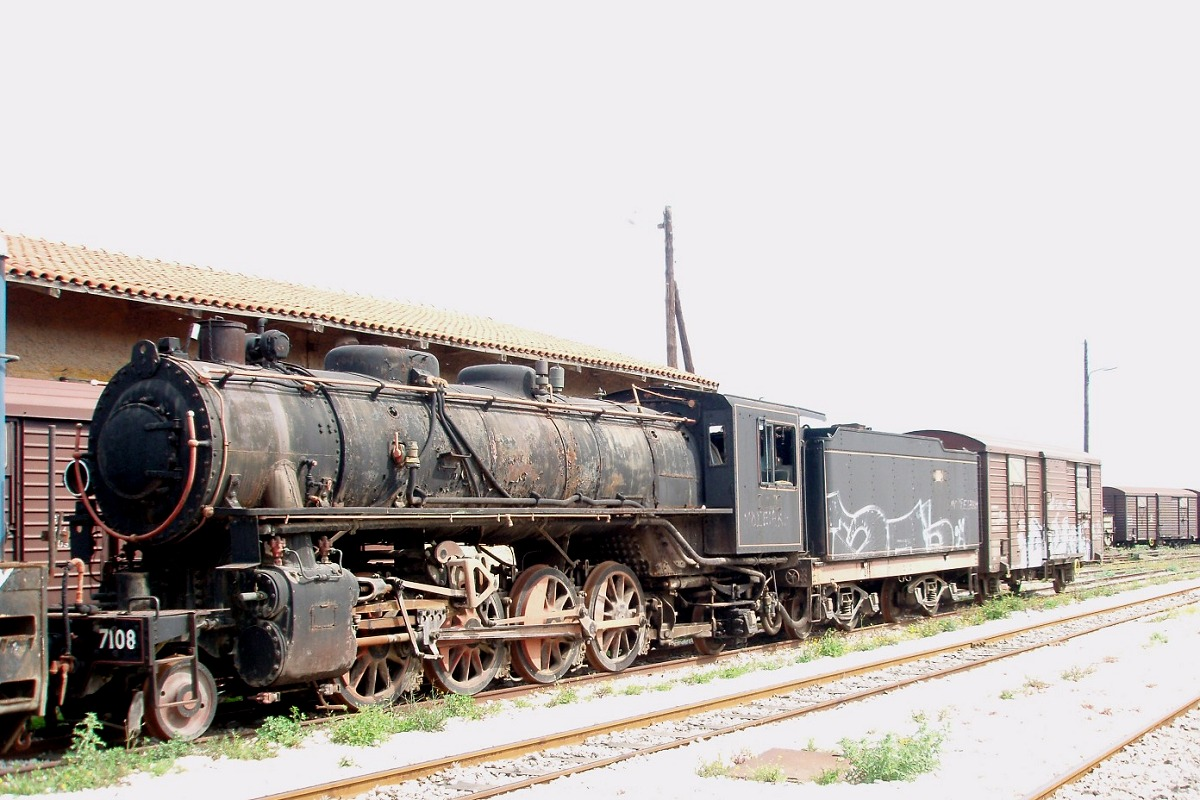
- SPAP Δ108, later SEK 7108, a post-war S118 copy, displayed at Corinth Old Station, April 2007
Type and origin
- Power type: Steam
- Builder: American Locomotive Company (338), Baldwin Locomotive Works (253+33), Davenport Locomotive Works (67+6), HK Porter (25+5), Vulcan Iron Works (58+8)
- Build date: 1942–1945 (for USATC), 1945–1948 (copies)
- Total produced: 741 for USATC, 52 copies
Specifications
- Configuration
  - Whyte: 2-8-2
  - UIC: 1′D1′ h2
- Gauge: 3 ft (914 mm); 1,000 mm (3 ft 3 3/8 in) metre gauge 3 ft 6 in (1,067 mm)
- Leading dia.: 26 in (660 mm)
- Driver dia.: 48 in (1,219 mm)
- Trailing dia.: 30 in (762 mm)
- Length: 59 ft 5 1/2 in (18,123 mm)
- Adhesive weight: 80,000 lb (36,300 kilograms; 36.3 metric tons)
- Loco weight: 119,000 lb (53,980 kilograms; 53.98 metric tons)
- Tender weight: 96,700 lb (43,860 kilograms; 43.86 metric tons)
- Fuel type: Coal or fuel oil
- Fuel capacity: 18,000 lb (8,160 kilograms; 8.16 metric tons)
- Water cap.: 5,000 US gal (18,927 L; 4,163.4 imp gal)
- Firebox
  - Grate area: 27.7 sq ft (2.57 m^{2})
- Boiler pressure: 185 lbf/in^{2} (1.28 MPa)
- Heating surface
  - Firebox: 115 sq ft (10.7 m^{2})
  - Tubes and flues: 1,256 sq ft (116.7 m^{2})
  - Total surface: 1,371 sq ft (127.4 m^{2})
- Superheater
  - Heating area: 374 sq ft (34.7 m^{2})
- Cylinders: Two, outside
- Cylinder size: 16 in × 24 in (406 mm × 610 mm)
- Valve gear: Indirect Walschaerts
- Valve type: Piston valves
- Loco brake: Air
- Train brakes: Air
- Couplers: Knuckle
Performance figures
- Tractive effort: 20,100 lbf (89.4 kN)
- Factor of adh.: 3.98
Career
- Operators: United States Army Transportation Corps; White Pass and Yukon Route; Tweetsie Railroad; Dollywood Express; Zig Zag Railway; Queensland Rail
- Class: S118
- Numbers: 3000–3029, 130–249, 257–639, 661–788, 811–890
- Locale: North America, South America, North Africa, West Africa, East Africa, Middle East, South and South East Asia, Australia
- Retired: 1951–1959
- Preserved: 14
- Restored: 1960–1961 (Nos. 190 and 192)
- Disposition: 14 preserved, reminder scrapped

The United States Army Transportation Corps (USATC) S118 Class is a class of 2-8-2 steam locomotive. Built to either 3 ft (914 mm), 1,000 mm (3 ft 3 3/8 in) metre gauge or 3 ft 6 in (1,067 mm) gauge, they were used in at least 24 different countries.

== History ==
Based on Australia's new C17 class locomotives, their specifications were forwarded to the United States where the United States Army Transportation Corps (USATC) drew up plans for a 2-8-2 with specifications similar to a C17 class. 741 were built in the period late 1942–1945 with a further 52 appearing between 1945 and 1948. They were built by Baldwin (253+33), Alco (338), Porter (25+5), Davenport (67+6) and Vulcan (58+8) in the United States. The first thirty were numbered 3000–3029, with subsequently locomotives numbered 130–249, and 257–889. Locomotives 640–660 and 789–810 were cancelled.

The first twenty locomotives (3000–3019) were sent to Nigeria. Eleven, (190–200), were converted to 3 ft (914 mm) gauge by putting 3 in (76.2 mm) wide spacers (rings) between the wheels and the truck side frames on same length axles, and delivered to the White Pass and Yukon Route in Alaska. Twenty (216–235) were delivered to Queensland where they formed the Queensland Railways' AC16 Class. Others were sent to North Africa, the Gold Coast (Africa), Iraq, India, and Burma.

After the war, surplus locomotives were sold to Malaya, the Philippines (as Manila Railroad 850 class), Siam, Cambodia, Cameroon, Tanganyika, northern Argentina, Taiwan and the United Fruit Company (for operations in Costa Rica and Honduras).

== Copies ==
Baldwin built 33 copies for the Indian Railways, Porter built two for the Chemins de Fer des Grands Lacs in the Belgian Congo, Vulcan built a batch of eight for the Piraeus, Athens and Peloponnese Railways (SPAP) in Greece (class Δ). Davenport built six with a higher boiler pressure for the Chemin de Fer Franco-Ethiopien de Djibouti á Addis-Ababa.

== Survivors ==
14 S118 locomotives were preserved:

No.	Builder	Post WW2 Owner	Current owner	Location	Status	Image	Notes
190	Baldwin 69425	White Pass and Yukon Route	Tweetsie Railroad	Blowing Rock, North Carolina, United States	Operational		Named "The Yukon Queen".
192	Baldwin 69427	White Pass and Yukon Route	Dollywood	Pigeon Forge, Tennessee, United States	Operational		Named "Klondike Katie".
195	Baldwin 69430	White Pass and Yukon Route	City of Skagway	Skagway, Alaska, United States	Displayed		
218	Baldwin 69453	Queensland Railways	Zig Zag Railway	Lithgow, New South Wales, Australia	Operational		Named "The Yank"
221	Baldwin 69456	Queensland Railways	Queensland Rail	Ipswich, Queensland, Australia	Operational		Mainline Certified
1798	Baldwin 74011	Northeast Frontier Railway		New Jalpaiguri, India	Operational		Post war copy
Δ-101	Vulcan 4700	Piraeus, Athens and Peloponnese Railways	OSE	Myloi, Greece	Dumped		Post-war copy, later SEK No. 7101
Δ-102	Vulcan 4701	Piraeus, Athens and Peloponnese Railways	OSE	Myloi, Greece	Dumped		Post-war copy, later SEK No. 7102
Δ-103	Vulcan 4702	Piraeus, Athens and Peloponnese Railways	OSE	Myloi, Greece	Dumped		Post-war copy, later SEK No. 7103
Δ-104	Vulcan 4703	Piraeus, Athens and Peloponnese Railways	OSE	Kalamata, Greece	Displayed		Post-war copy, later SEK No. 7104
Δ-105	Vulcan 4704	Piraeus, Athens and Peloponnese Railways	OSE	Kalamata, Greece	Dumped		Post-war copy, later SEK No. 7105
Δ-106	Vulcan 4705	Piraeus, Athens and Peloponnese Railways	OSE	Tripolis, Greece	Dumped		Post-war copy, later SEK No. 7106
Δ-107	Vulcan 4706	Piraeus, Athens and Peloponnese Railways	OSE	Myloi, Greece	Dumped		Post-war copy, later SEK No. 7107
Δ-108	Vulcan 4707	Piraeus, Athens and Peloponnese Railways	OSE	Corinth, Greece	Stored		Post-war copy, later SEK No. 7108
