= Tweetsie Railroad =

North Carolina attraction

- Interactive map of Tweetsie Railroad
- Location: Blowing Rock, North Carolina, U.S.
- Coordinates: 36.170930°N 81.649029°W
- Opened: July 4, 1957
- Owner: Tweetsie Railroad, Inc.
- Theme: Wild West
- Operating season: April - December
- Area: 200 acres (81 ha), 30 acres (12 ha) developed

Attractions
- Total: 16
- Website: tweetsie.com

Tweetsie Railroad is a family-oriented Wild West theme park located between Boone and Blowing Rock, North Carolina, United States. The centerpiece of the park is a 3-mile (4.8 km) ride on a train pulled by one of Tweetsie Railroad's two historic narrow-gauge steam locomotives.

The park also features a variety of amusement rides, live shows, a zoo and other attractions geared towards families with children. The park also hosts a variety of special events throughout the year including their Halloween and Christmas-themed events.

== Park history ==
Origins of Tweetsie Railroad

The theme park's history can be traced back to the late 19th Century, when narrow-gauge railroads began to access the remote areas of the Blue Ridge Mountains. Coal-fired steam locomotive locomotive No. 12 is the only surviving narrow-gauge engine of the East Tennessee and Western North Carolina Railroad (ET&WNC). Built in 1917 by the Baldwin Locomotive Works, No. 12 is a 3 ft (914 mm) gauge 4-6-0 coal-fired locomotive that ran from 1918 to 1940 carrying passengers and freight over the ET&WNC's 66-mile (106.2 km) route from Johnson City, Tennessee to Boone, North Carolina.

The name "Tweetsie" was given to the original ET&WNC by area residents as a verbal acronym of its initials, but also referred to the "tweet" of the locomotive whistles that echoed through the mountains. The nickname stuck with the railroad and its trains and became more identifiable than the railroad's official ET&WNC name.

Two years after the narrow-gauge portion of the ET&WNC ceased operations in 1950, the locomotive was purchased by a group of railroad enthusiasts and taken to Penn Laird, Virginia to operate as the Shenandoah Central Railroad, which opened in May 1953. Rains from Hurricane Hazel washed out the Shenandoah Central in October 1954, and Locomotive No. 12 was once again put up for sale. Cowboy actor and singer Gene Autry signed an option to purchase the locomotive and train cars for $17,000, with the intent to move them to California for use in motion pictures. However, Autry determined that the transportation and restoration costs made his plan impractical and decided to let his purchase option lapse.

=== Tourist attraction ===
Grover Robbins, an entrepreneur from Blowing Rock, North Carolina, heard about the locomotive's availability, and purchased Autry's option for one dollar. Robbins then paid the $17,000 purchase price to the Shenandoah Central operators in August 1955. Robbins' plan was to bring the locomotive and rolling stock back to its original home in the Blue Ridge Mountains, initially as an excursion railroad. Robbins obtained a suitable site midway between the towns of Boone and Blowing Rock, and one mile of track was constructed. After restoration at the Southern Railway shops in Hickory, NC, the No. 12 locomotive and rolling stock were transported up the Blue Ridge Mountains by Charlotte-based Moss-McLeod Trucking Company.

The train would soon become the centerpiece of the new "Tweetsie Railroad" tourist attraction. On July 4, 1957, the locomotive made its first public trip over the line. In 1958, the track was extended to a 3-mile loop around the mountain, the trains at Tweetsie Railroad can how travel in a full circle. Grover Robbins' brothers, Harry and Spencer, were also involved with the operation of Tweetsie Railroad, and the park is still controlled and operated by the Robbins family.

In 1960, Tweetsie acquired another coal-fired steam locomotive, the No. 190 "Yukon Queen" from Alaska's White Pass and Yukon Route. Also built by Baldwin Locomotive Works in 1943 for the US Army, the USATC S118 Class 2-8-2 engine was part of an 11-locomotive fleet of "MacArthur" 2-8-2s originally constructed for the US Army for use overseas. During World War II, the locomotives were sent to Alaska for use on the White Pass and Yukon.

Tweetsie Railroad became a popular tourist attraction, and quickly evolved into the first theme park in North Carolina — and one of the first in the nation. A western town and saloon were built around the original depot area. A train robbery and cowboy-and-Indian show were added to the train ride, playing off the Wild West theme that was very popular at the time on television and in motion pictures. The theme was enhanced by regular visits from singing cowboy Fred Kirby, who hosted a popular children's television show on Charlotte NC's WBTV. In 1961, a chairlift and amusement ride area was constructed on the central mountain inside the rail loop, and over the decades the park has been expanded with additional rides, attractions, shops, zoo and restaurants.

On August 17, 2024, No. 12 was taken out of service to undergo a major rebuild, it was expected to return to service again for the 2027 operating season.

== General information ==
Tweetsie Railroad is located on US 321 between Boone and Blowing Rock, North Carolina.

Tweetsie Railroad's Wild West-themed operating season is from April to October. The park is open on weekends in the spring and autumn, and Thursdays through Mondays (closed Tuesdays and Wednesdays) from Memorial Day weekend until mid-August. In addition, the park is open on Friday and Saturday nights from late September through the month of October for the popular "Ghost Train" Halloween event. The park then closes for daytime operations, then re-opens on select evenings after Thanksgiving for "Tweetsie Christmas", which runs through the month of December. Other special events are held throughout the season, including a large fireworks display on the Fourth of July, and Railroad Heritage Weekend in August, which focuses on the history of Tweetsie Railroad's narrow-gauge locomotives.

Tweetsie Railroad's Main Street during Tweetsie Christmas

In addition to the Wild West train adventure and the amusement rides, Tweetsie Railroad has a variety of live entertainment shows. The park hosts numerous special events each season, including Letterland-themed days in May for school groups, a week-long Day Out With Thomas event in June featuring Thomas the Tank Engine, a nighttime "Ghost Train" Halloween event in late September and October, and the "Tweetsie Christmas" event running from Thanksgiving weekend until the end of December.

=== Steam Locomotive Shop ===
Tweetsie Railroad has its own locomotive workshop to maintain its two locomotives as well as providing repair, parts and overhaul services for other narrow-gauge steam locomotives from several different theme parks such as Busch Gardens, Dollywood, Six Flags, and Walt Disney World. The railroad also currently handles parts, restoration and service of steam locomotives built by Crown Metal Products, having purchased the necessary tooling, jigs, inventory and rights in 2004.

=== Dollywood Connection ===
In 1961, Grover and Harry Robbins built another theme park called "Rebel Railroad" in the Smoky Mountains near Pigeon Forge, Tennessee. Originally featuring a Civil War theme in connection with the war's centennial, the park was re-themed in 1966 as the Wild West "Goldrush Junction", inspired by the original Tweetsie Railroad. The Robbins brothers sold Goldrush Junction in the late 1960s, and it subsequently went through various owners. In 1976, Jack and Pete Herschend of Branson, Missouri bought the park and redeveloped it as a sister park to their original park, Silver Dollar City. The new park was known as Silver Dollar City Tennessee. In 1986, country music star Dolly Parton became a part-owner with the Herschends and the theme park became today's Dollywood. The railroad continues to run as the Dollywood Express.

== Rides and attractions ==
Rides at Tweetsie Railroad include:

- "Buckaroo Drop" Drop Tower ride
- "Tornado" spinning ride
- "Barrels of Fun" Spinning roller coaster
- Carousel
- Tilt-a-whirl
- Ferris wheel
- "Tweetsie Twister" scrambler ride
- Chairlift
- Turnpike Cruisers
- Himalaya
- The Bullwhip pendulum ride
- Little Drummer Boy, a classic teacups ride (runs during Tweetsie Christmas only)
- Mouse Mine Train (3 ft (914 mm) narrow gauge child-oriented train ride loop through a tunnel that houses an animatronic show)
- Mini Swing
- F-80 Jet Planes
- Kiddie Boats
- Red Baron- type planes and helicopters
- Bikes & Buggies flat ride

Other attractions at Tweetsie Railroad include the Tweetsie Palace Saloon and Diamond Lil's Can-Can Revue, other live shows, gold panning and gem mining, the Deer Park zoo, a variety of specialty shops and food service locations, and a game arcade.

== Locomotives ==
Locomotive details
Number	Name	Images	Type	Class	Model	Built	Builder	Serial number	Date entered service	Status
12	Tweetsie		Steam	10-26-D	4-6-0	1917	Baldwin Locomotive Works	45069	July 1957	Undergoing major overhaul
190	Yukon Queen		Steam	S118	2-8-2	1943	Baldwin Locomotive Works	69425	1960	Operational

== Accidents and incidents ==
- On the early morning of March 16, 2008 a fire broke out in the park which destroyed a museum and gift shop which contained a large amount of material relating to the original railroad, history of the park, as well a substantial amount of Fred Kirby memorabilia. The building itself was believed to have been the original train depot, and had been moved to the park in 1954. The area where the museum had been was levelled and turned into a large resting area adjacent to a souvenir photo stand.
- In May 2008, the park was threatened with permanent closure. The large trestle bridge that runs through the park sat on a small piece of land that the park leased. The owners were interested in selling it for development, but Watauga County commissioners paid $3.5 million dollars to settle the dispute between the park and the landowners, leasing it back to the park for eventual re-payment.

== See also ==
- Land of Oz (theme park): another park developed by Grover Robbins
- Dollywood: amusement park in Pigeon Forge, Tennessee
- Silver Dollar City: amusement park in Branson, Missouri
