= Dollywood Express =

Heritage railway at Dollywood

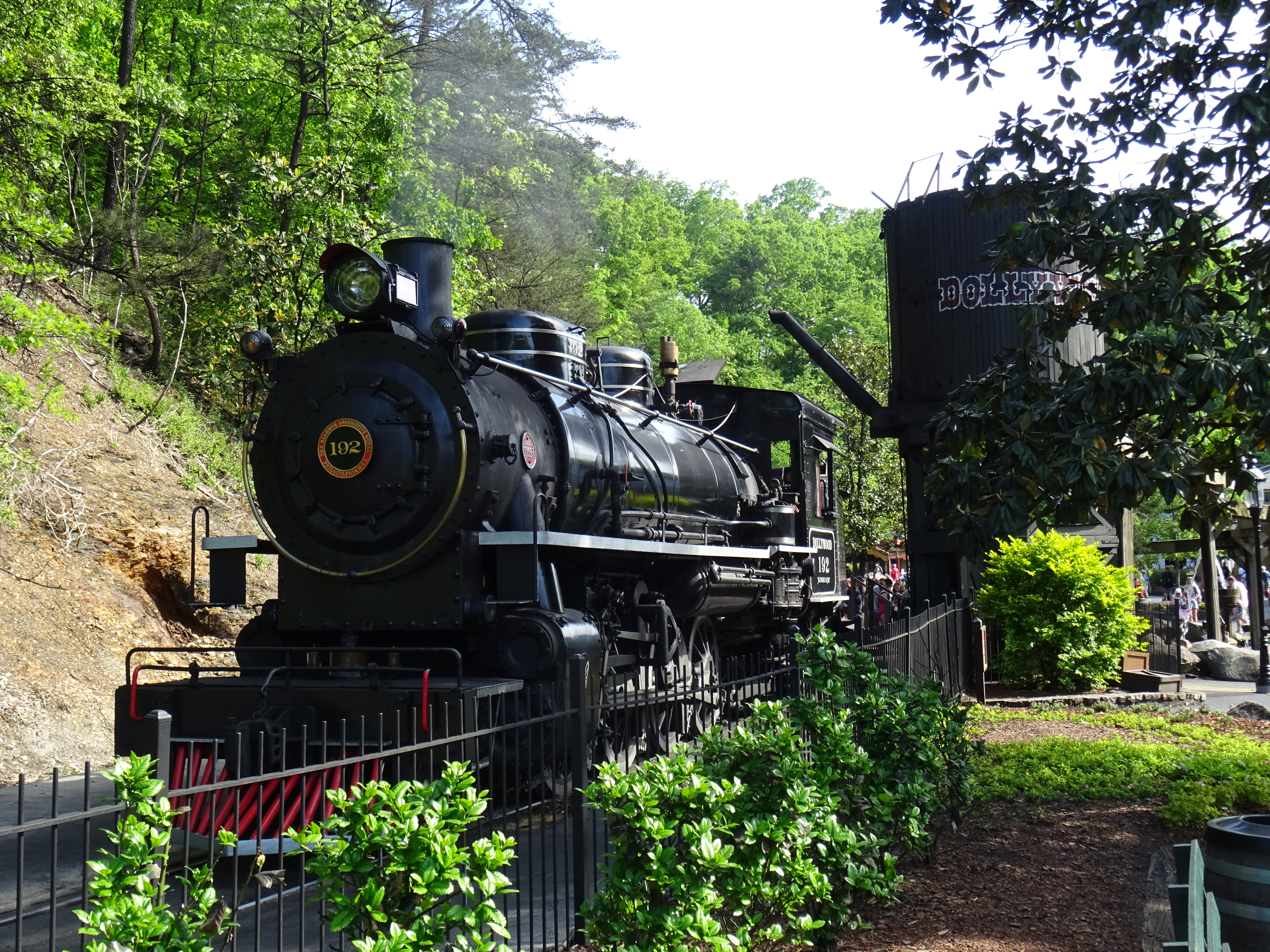
- No. 192 at the station, May 10, 2023

Dollywood
- Area: Village
- Status: Operating
- Opening date: July 1961

Ride statistics
- Attraction type: Heritage railway
- Manufacturer: Baldwin Locomotive Works
- Website: Dollywood Express
- Wheelchair accessible

The Dollywood Express is a 3 ft (914 mm) narrow-gauge heritage railroad and amusement park attraction located in the Dollywood amusement park in Pigeon Forge, Tennessee.

== Description ==
The Dollywood Express runs along a 2.5 mile loop-to-loop track from the Village to the top of the mountain Dollywood borders to the north. It is pulled by two ex-White Pass & Yukon Route 2-8-2 "Mikado" type steam locomotives. It is the oldest attraction in Dollywood, opening at the theme park "Rebel Railroad" in 1961. It is also one of the signature attractions at Dollywood, appearing in almost all advertising.

== History ==
=== Rebel Railroad ===
In 1957, North Carolina real-estate developer Grover Robbins opened a theme park between Boone and Blowing Rock called Tweetsie Railroad with ex-East Tennessee and Western North Carolina Railroad 4-6-0 #12. The park was an instant success. In 1960, he acquired two USATC S118 Class 2-8-2s from the White Pass and Yukon Route. The success of Tweetsie prompted him to send one of them, #192, to the Smoky Mountains of East Tennessee for a second theme park, called Rebel Railroad. The other, #190, was sent to Tweetsie and still operates there. The Rebel Railroad was officially opened to the public in July 1961 and was a huge success.

=== Gold Rush Junction ===
In 1966, Robbins renamed the attraction Gold Rush Junction and a western-style "shootout" was added at the midway point in the ride, allowing the locomotive to stop and "cool its heels". In 1970 the Cleveland Browns football team bought the attraction, but the locomotive and cars retained their colors and text.

=== Silver Dollar City Tennessee ===
In 1976, Jack and Pete Herschend bought Gold Rush Junction, renaming it Silver Dollar City Tennessee, making it a sister park to its Branson, Missouri attraction Silver Dollar City. The ride was renamed again. This time, instead of a minor text change, #192 was given a complete new look. It was painted black instead of Tweetsie green. It was also fitted with balloon stacks to give it a more western look. In 1977, the ride acquired two new locomotives from the WP&YR, #70, and #71, along with spare parts from #72.

=== Dollywood ===
In 1986, Dolly Parton became part owner of the property, and the park was renamed Dollywood. The train ride itself was renamed to Dollywood Express. After the 2004 operating season, the park removed the balloon stacks and gave the locomotives a new coat of paint. Since the removal of the balloon stacks, the locomotive's paint schemes have been revised. On February 24, 2026, Dollywood announced that they converted one of the locomotives from burning coal to oil to enable them to run more in unfavorable conditions. The conversion will also reduce maintenance and pollution.

== Equipment ==
=== Locomotives ===
Locomotive details
Number	Image	Type	Model	Built	Builder	Serial number	Former	Status	Notes
70		Steam	2-8-2	1938	Baldwin Locomotive Works	62234	White Pass and Yukon Route	Operational	Nicknamed the "Cinderella". Converted to run on oil around 2026.
71	-	Steam	2-8-2	1939	Baldwin Locomotive Works	62257	White Pass and Yukon Route	Stored, awaiting restoration	Nicknamed the "Beatrice".
192		Steam	2-8-2	1943	Baldwin Locomotive Works	69427	White Pass and Yukon Route	Operational	Nicknamed the "Klondike Katie".

=== Former locomotives ===
Locomotive details
Number	Image	Type	Model	Built	Builder	Serial number	Former	Status	Notes
72	-	Steam	2-8-2	1947	Baldwin Locomotive Works	73351	White Pass and Yukon Route	Scrapped	Used as a spare parts source for engine No. 70.
107		Steam	2-8-0	1887	Baldwin Locomotive Works	8869	East Tennessee, Virginia and Georgia Railway	Sold	Locomotive No. 107 has/was always been a static display, dating back to the park’s earliest days when it was known as Rebel Railroad. It is a Consolidation-style, standard-gauge locomotive—far too large to operate on the park’s narrow-gauge track system. No. 107 was removed from display and sold to the Knoxville and Holston River Railroad as of January 22, 2025.
206		Steam	2-6-0	1910	Baldwin Locomotive Works	Unknown	Genesee and Wyoming Railroad	Sold	Built as Genesee and Wyoming Railroad No. 9. Sold to the Brooklyn Cooperage Company in 1918. Sold to the Tennessee & North Carolina Railroad in 1927. Transferred to the SMRR in 1938. Retired December 9, 1954. Put on display alongside No. 107 in 1961. Sold to the Chattanooga Choo Choo Hotel in 1973.

== Train maintenance ==
When the park is closed during part of the winter every year, the Dollywood maintenance crew usually follows a checklist to maintain the trains and keep them in pristine, working condition. According to Dollywood, the trains are sanded down and repainted every year, the running boards are replaced, brake systems are overhauled and other basic repairs are made where necessary. The train repair crew even contours the wheels if needed to ensure that patrons of the attraction can have a smooth, bump free ride.

Along with the regular maintenance performed every year on the locomotives, the train repair crew also overhauls the engine on the locomotives every ten years to ensure the trains operate properly. The locomotives are also winterized at the end of their yearly maintenance to ensure that they are protected from the cold in the park's offseason.

== Accidents and incidents ==
- On April 14, 2004, a female passenger fell out of one of the train's carriages while it was in motion. An investigation determined that a drink was spilled on the woman, who then lost her balance and fell out of the train. The attraction was closed after the incident but was re-opened the next day after it was determined to be operating normally. The passenger was taken to UT Medical Center in Knoxville, Tennessee, and was released a day later.
- On October 18, 2020, Locomotive No. 70 was being prepped for service when a grease fire started on the side of the engine. There were no injuries that occurred and the fire was quickly put out.
- On October 1, 2023, one of the steam locomotives was hauling a passenger train around the park when one of the passenger cars derailed due to a mechanical issue of a track switch. There were no injuries and the passengers were safely evacuated.

== See also ==
- Frisco Silver Dollar Line
- Rail transport in Walt Disney Parks and Resorts
- Stone Mountain Scenic Railroad
- Tweetsie Railroad
