= White Pass and Yukon Route 73 =

Preserved US/Canadian narrow gauge 2-8-2 locomotive

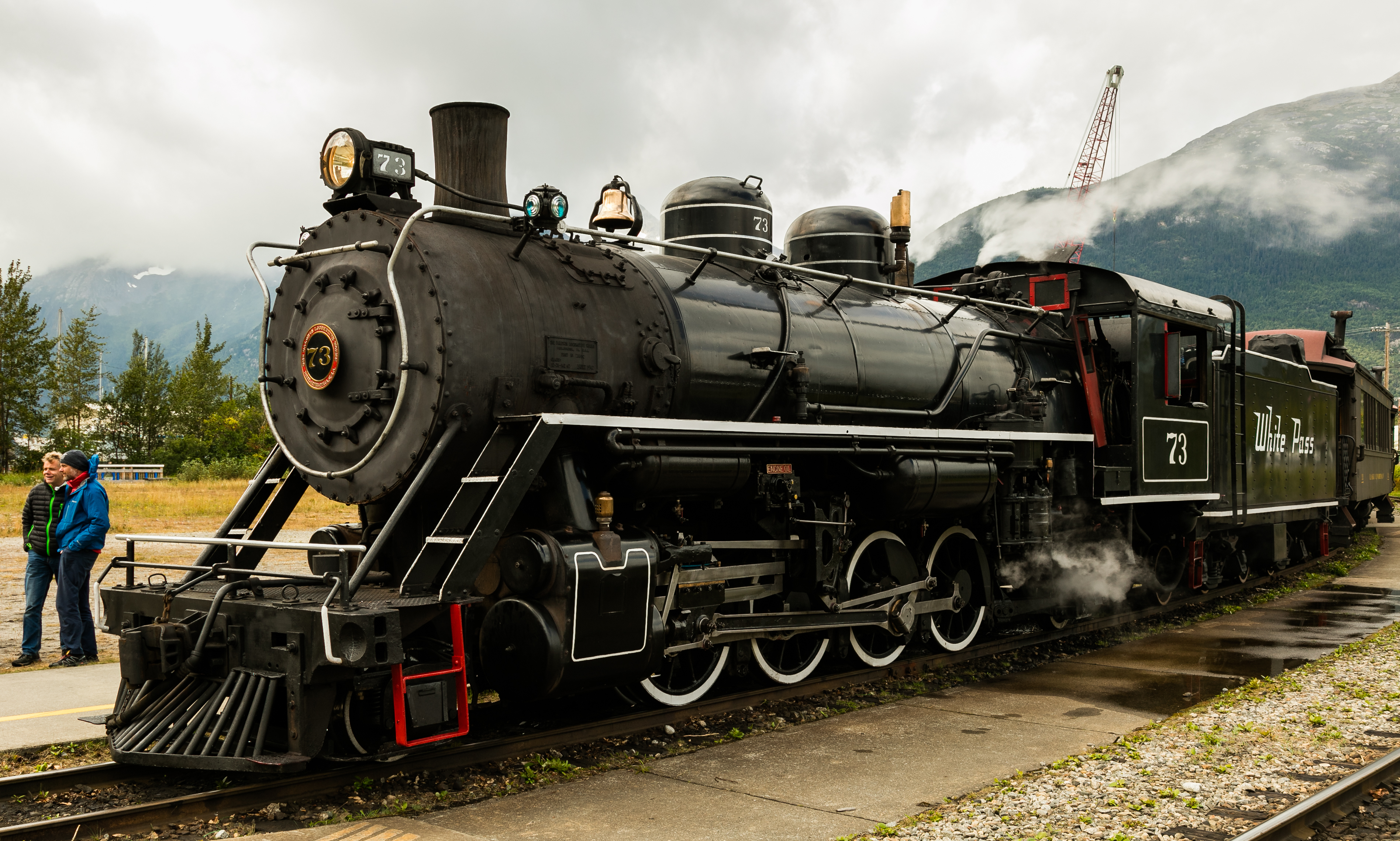
- No. 73 at Skagway, Alaska, United States, August 18, 2017
Type and origin
- Power type: Steam
- Builder: Baldwin Locomotive Works
- Serial number: 73352
- Model: 12 28¼ E
- Build date: May 1947
Specifications
- Configuration
  - Whyte: 2-8-2
  - UIC: 1′D1′ h2
- Gauge: 3 ft (914 mm)
- Driver dia.: 44 in (1.118 m)
- Wheelbase: 55 ft 8 1/2 in (16.98 m)
- Height: 12 ft 7 in (3.84 m)
- Adhesive weight: 108,000 lb (49.0 t)
- Loco weight: 145,000 lb (65.8 t)
- Total weight: 248,400 lb (112.7 t)
- Fuel type: New: Coal; Now: Oil
- Fuel capacity: Coal: 8 t (7.9 long tons; 8.8 short tons); Oil: 2,500 US gal (9,500 L; 2,100 imp gal)
- Water cap.: 5,000 US gal (19,000 L; 4,200 imp gal)
- Firebox
  - Grate area: 36 sq ft (3.3 m^{2})
- Boiler: 64 in (1.63 m) diameter
- Boiler pressure: 220 psi (1.52 MPa)
- Heating surface
  - Firebox: 114 sq ft (10.6 m^{2})
  - Tubes: 993 sq ft (92.3 m^{2})
  - Flues: 555 sq ft (51.6 m^{2})
  - Total surface: 1,676 sq ft (155.7 m^{2})
- Cylinders: Two, outside
- Cylinder size: 17 in × 22 in (432 mm × 559 mm)
- Valve gear: Walschaerts
- Valve type: Piston valves
- Loco brake: Air
- Train brakes: Air
- Couplers: Knuckle
Performance figures
- Tractive effort: 25,200 lbf (112.1 kN)
- Factor of adh.: 4.24
Career
- Operators: White Pass and Yukon Route
- Class: 12-28 ¼ E
- Number in class: 4th of 4
- Numbers: WPY 73
- Nicknames: Hog; Queen of the Fleet
- Retired: June 30, 1964
- Restored: April 1982
- Current owner: White Pass and Yukon Route
- Disposition: Operational

White Pass and Yukon Route 73 is a narrow-gauge 2-8-2 "Mikado" type steam locomotive, built in 1947 by the Baldwin Locomotive Works (BLW). It is preserved and operated by the White Pass and Yukon Route (WPY) in Skagway, Alaska.

== History ==
No. 73 was built in May 1947 by the Baldwin Locomotive Works (BLW) for the White Pass and Yukon Route (WPY), it was referred to as Queen of the Fleet, due to it being the very last of the four 70-Class locomotives that was constructed for the WP&YR and the last narrow gauge locomotive built by Baldwin. (Note: Attributed to multiple sources:) The Baldwin Class 12-28 ¼ E were often referred to as Hog by the crew members, due to their high fuel consumption. It was originally built as a coal burner, but was later converted to burn oil in the 1950s.

The locomotive worked two decades on the WPY hauling both freight and passenger trains until it was retired from revenue service on June 30, 1964 and put into storage. (Note: Attributed to multiple sources:) The locomotive was moved to Bennett, British Columbia, Canada, in 1968 for static display.

In 1979, the locomotive was moved again to Whitehorse, Yukon, Canada, this time to be restored to operating condition. It returned to service in April 1982 and hauled its first inaugural run on May 29; since then, it has hauled excursion trains over the WPY line.

In 2003, No. 73 was taken out of service to undergo a major two-year overhaul, with an estimate cost of $500,000; work was completed in 2004 and the locomotive returned to service. In 2012, No. 73 was taken out of service again to undergo another major two-year overhaul, which was completed in 2014.

In September 2009, No. 73 ran a rare doubleheader excursion special with No. 69, running from Skagway to Fraser, British Columbia, and return.

In 2017, No. 73 was taken out of service and moved to Arlington, Washington, United States, to undergo its Federal Railroad Administration (FRA) 1,472-day inspection and overhaul. On June 15, 2019, No. 73's overhaul was completed and the engine returned to the WPY on June 17.

No. 73 was scheduled to operate for the 2020 operating season, but was later canceled due to the railroad suspending their tourist operations over the COVID-19 pandemic. The railroad planned to resumed operations in July 2021, but was pushed back for two more years until eventually resuming operations in May 2023. In June 2024, No. 73 eventually returned to service hauling excursions.

== Bibliography ==
- "All-Time Roster of Locomotives: White Pass & Yukon Route". Railroad Magazine. 67–68. Frank A. Munsey Company: 69. 1955.
- Cy, Martin (1974). Gold Rush Narrow Gauge: The Story of the White Pass and Yukon Route. Trans-Anglo Books. p. 64. ISBN 978-0-87-046026-5.
- Clifford, Howard (1981). Rails North: The Railroads of Alaska and the Yukon. Superior Publishing Company. pp. 36, 46. ISBN 978-0875645360.
- J. D. True (1994). It Happened on the White Pass: The Life and Times of a Narrow-Gauge Railway Engineer. Northbush Publications. ISBN 1-896079-02-4.
- Wilson, Graham (1998). The White Pass and Yukon Route Railway. Wolf Creek Books. ISBN 978-0-96-819552-9.
