= Fraser, British Columbia =

Settlement in British Columbia, Canada

Coordinates: 59°43′N 135°03′W

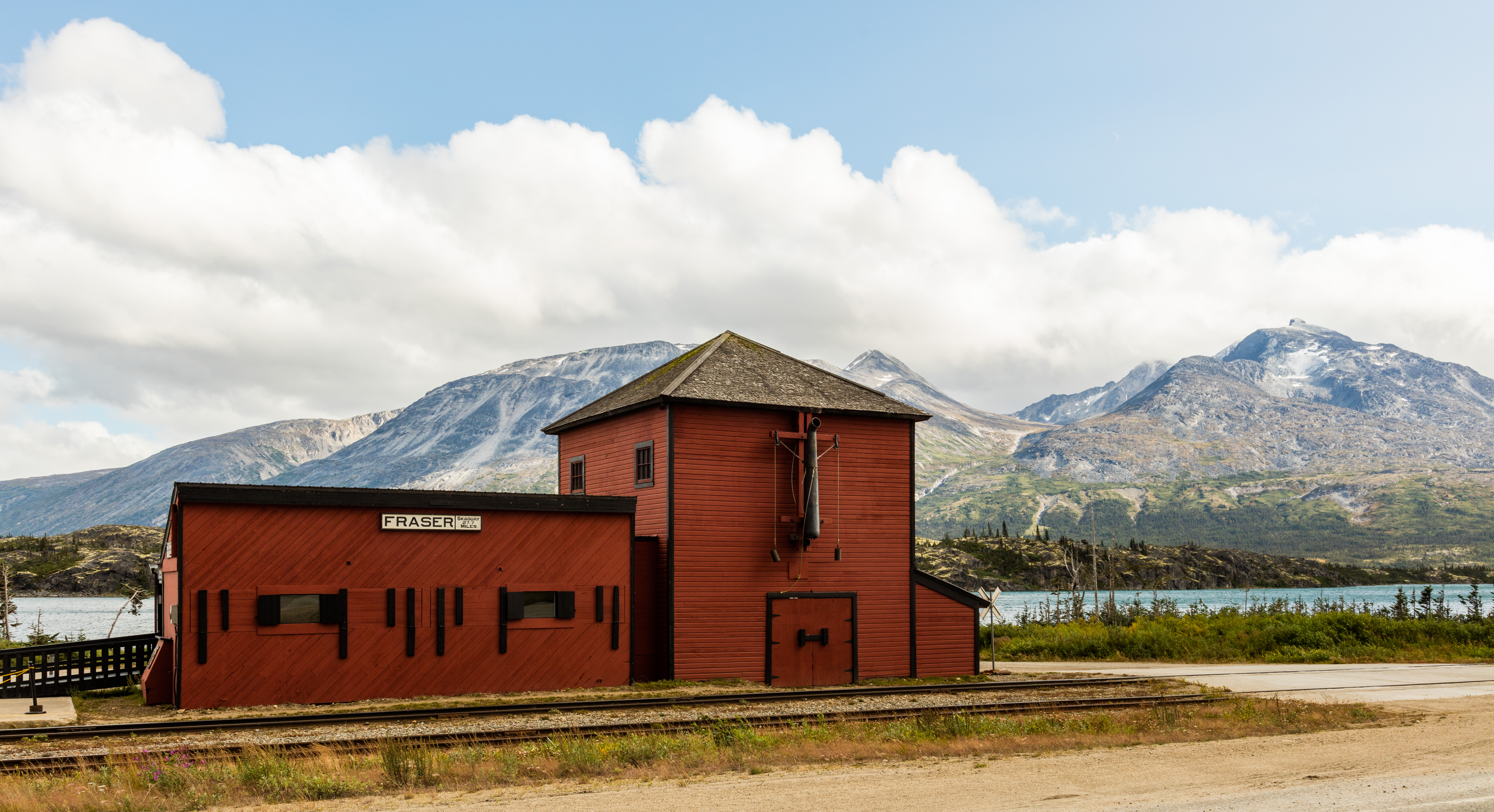
Fraser station building and waterhouse of the White Pass and Yukon Route, August 2017

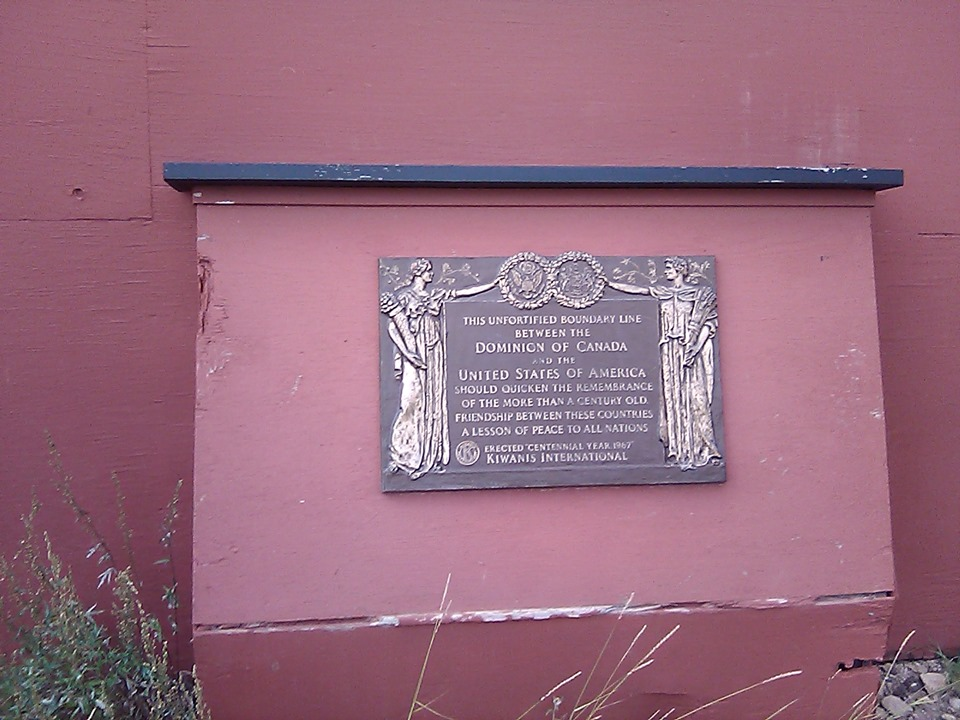
The boundary marker plaque at the border crossing station in Fraser, August 2019

Fraser is a location on the Klondike Highway in northwestern British Columbia, Canada.

Current services at Fraser station
Preceding station	White Pass and Yukon Route	Following station
White Pass Summit toward Skagway, Alaska (U.S.)	Bennett Scenic Journey	Bennett toward Carcross
White Pass Summit toward Skagway, Alaska (U.S.)	Steam Excursion	Bennett Terminus

== Description ==
The community has no businesses or permanent residents aside from employees of a Canada Border Services Agency port of entry located there, along with a Yukon territorial government highway maintenance camp and a privately owned micro-hydro project that provides power.

== Climate ==
There is a weather station for Fraser located along the Klondike Highway, at an elevation of 869 m (2851 ft).

Climate data for Fraser Camp, British Columbia, 1987-2007 normals, 1980-2008 extremes: 869m (2851ft)
Month	Jan	Feb	Mar	Apr	May	Jun	Jul	Aug	Sep	Oct	Nov	Dec	Year
Record high °C (°F)	14 (57)	7 (45)	10 (50)	15 (59)	22 (72)	27 (81)	27 (80)	29 (84)	22 (72)	18 (64)	7 (45)	7 (44)	29 (84)
Mean maximum °C (°F)	1.4 (34.6)	1.6 (34.9)	3.8 (38.8)	10.0 (50.0)	15.6 (60.1)	22.2 (72.0)	22.5 (72.5)	22.2 (72.0)	15.6 (60.0)	8.8 (47.8)	2.3 (36.2)	1.4 (34.5)	25.0 (77.0)
Mean daily maximum °C (°F)	−8.8 (16.1)	−6.6 (20.1)	−3.3 (26.0)	3.1 (37.5)	8.4 (47.1)	13.2 (55.8)	14.5 (58.1)	13.9 (57.0)	8.4 (47.1)	2.6 (36.6)	−4.2 (24.4)	−6.1 (21.0)	2.9 (37.2)
Daily mean °C (°F)	−12.6 (9.3)	−10.8 (12.6)	−8.1 (17.4)	−1.8 (28.7)	4.2 (39.5)	8.8 (47.8)	10.7 (51.2)	9.9 (49.9)	5.6 (42.1)	0.2 (32.4)	−6.8 (19.7)	−9.3 (15.3)	−0.8 (30.5)
Mean daily minimum °C (°F)	−16.6 (2.2)	−15.1 (4.8)	−12.7 (9.1)	−6.8 (19.8)	0.0 (32.0)	4.4 (39.9)	6.9 (44.5)	6.1 (42.9)	2.7 (36.9)	−2.1 (28.2)	−9.4 (15.1)	−12.7 (9.2)	−4.6 (23.7)
Mean minimum °C (°F)	−32.1 (−25.8)	−28.9 (−20.1)	−26.3 (−15.3)	−17.8 (−0.1)	−6.1 (21.0)	−0.1 (31.8)	3.2 (37.8)	0.9 (33.6)	−2.1 (28.2)	−10.9 (12.4)	−20.3 (−4.6)	−27.5 (−17.5)	−35.9 (−32.6)
Record low °C (°F)	−48 (−54)	−38 (−36)	−33 (−28)	−26 (−15)	−11 (12)	−2 (28)	−1 (30)	−2 (29)	−8 (18)	−20 (−4)	−35 (−31)	−39 (−38)	−48 (−54)
Average precipitation mm (inches)	132 (5.18)	100 (3.94)	75 (2.97)	27 (1.05)	20 (0.78)	30 (1.19)	38 (1.50)	54 (2.12)	91 (3.58)	102 (4.03)	127 (4.99)	140 (5.53)	936 (36.86)
Average snowfall cm (inches)	128 (50.4)	98 (38.5)	75 (29.7)	25 (9.9)	3.6 (1.4)	trace	0.0 (0.0)	0.0 (0.0)	3.0 (1.2)	44 (17.2)	123 (48.4)	136 (53.5)	635.6 (250.2)
Source: XMACIS2 (normals, extremes & 1987-2007 precip/snow)

== See also ==
- List of communities in British Columbia
