= White Pass and Yukon Route =

Canada–US railway line

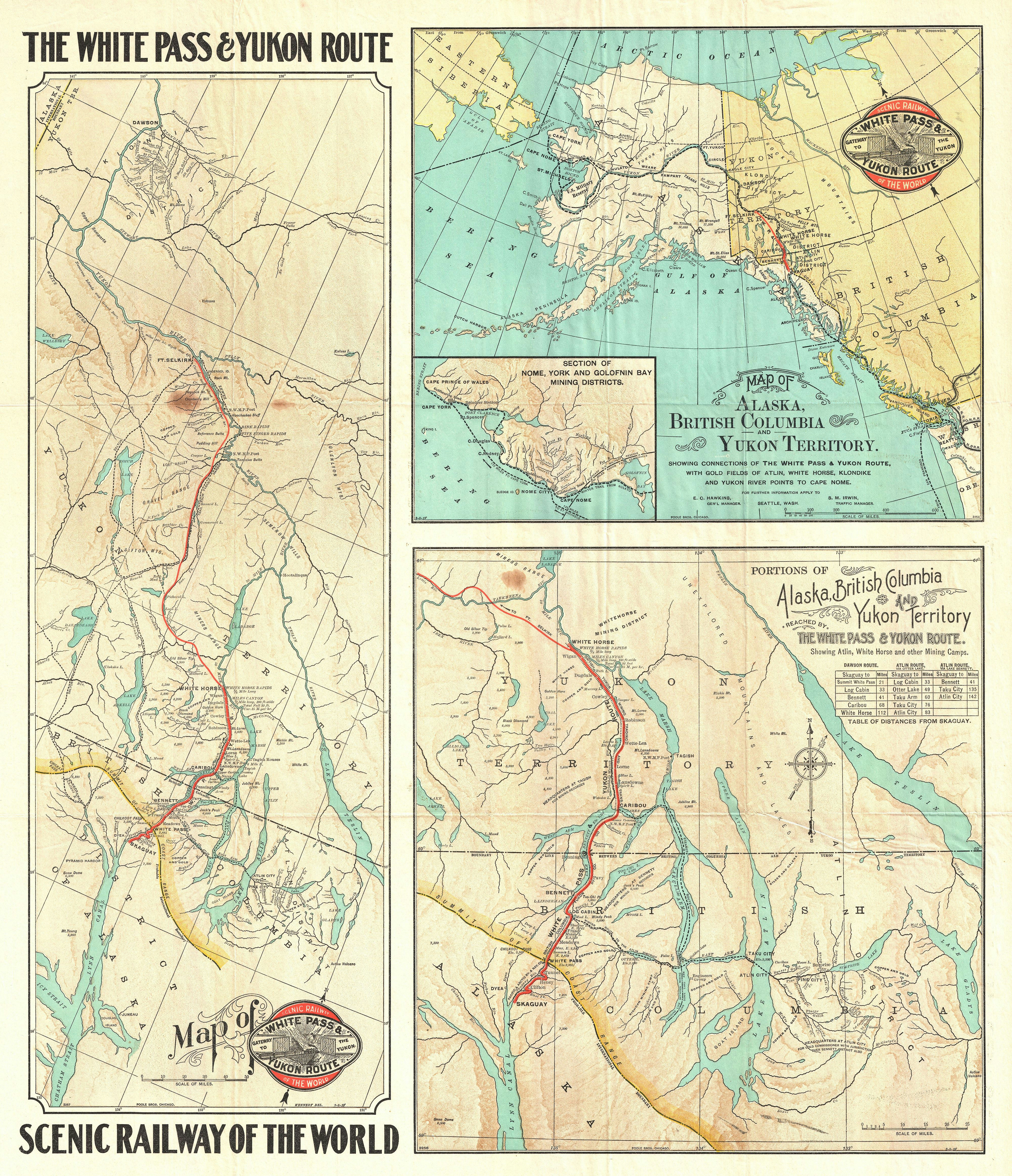

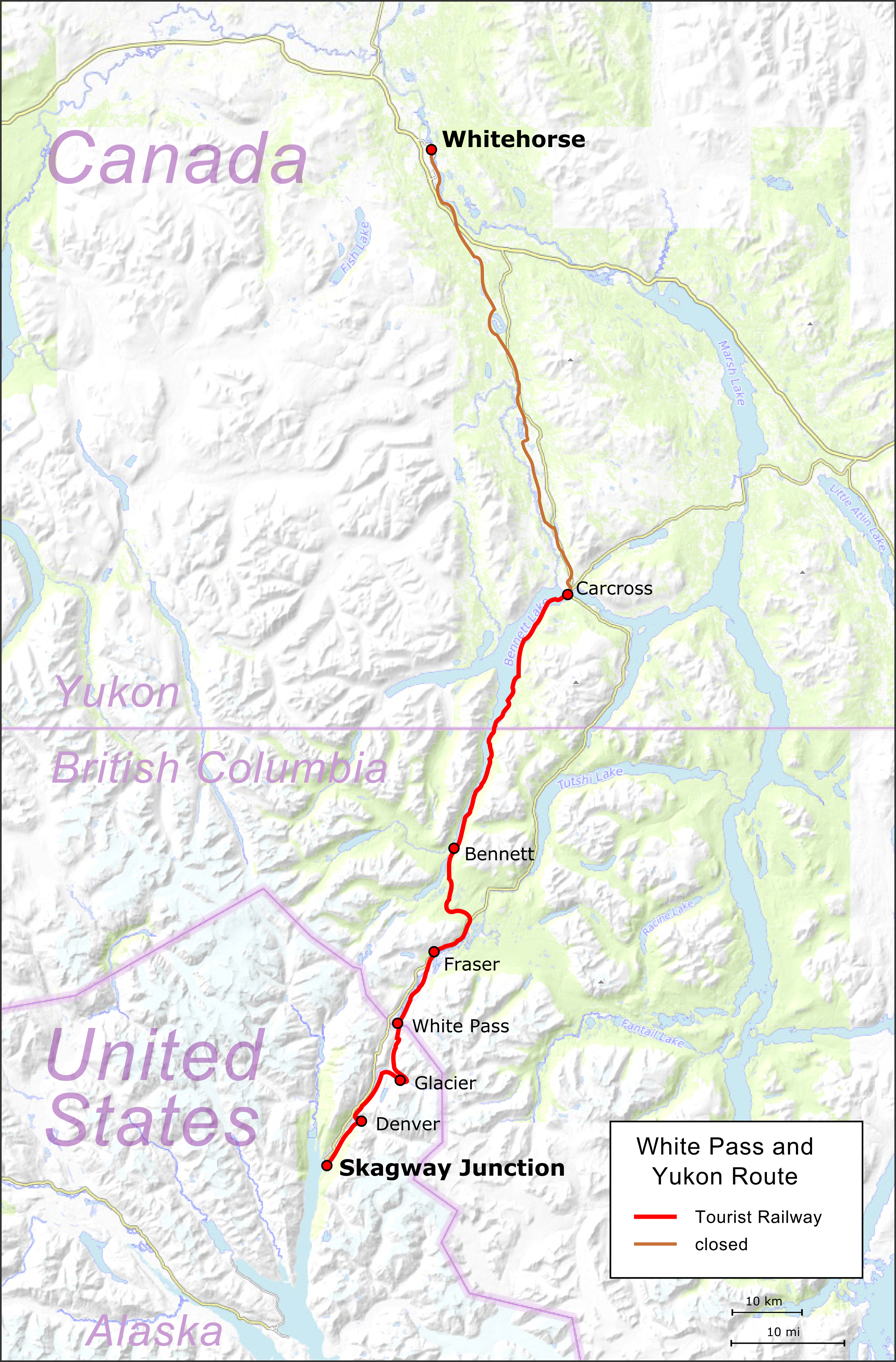

Commercial operations
- Original gauge: 3 ft (914 mm)

Preserved operations
- Reporting mark: WP&YR, WPY
- Length: 107 miles (172 km) (Skagway to Whitehorse); 67.5 miles (108.6 km) (Skagway to Carcross)
- Preserved gauge: 3 ft (914 mm)

Commercial history
- Opened: August 1, 1900
- Closed: October 8, 1982

Preservation history
- May 24, 1988: Reopened
- July 2020: Operations suspended
- May 2023: Operations resume
- Headquarters: Skagway, Alaska

Website
- wpyr.com

The White Pass and Yukon Route (WP&Y, WP&YR) (reporting mark WPY) is a Canadian and U.S. Class III 3 ft (914 mm) narrow-gauge railroad linking the port of Skagway, Alaska, with Whitehorse, the capital of Yukon. An isolated system, it has no direct connection to any other railroad. Equipment, freight and passengers are ferried by ship through the Port of Skagway, and via road through a few of the stops along its route.

The railroad began construction in 1898 during the Klondike Gold Rush as a means of reaching the gold fields. With its completion in 1900, it became the primary route to the interior of the Yukon, supplanting the Chilkoot Trail and other routes. The route continued operation until 1982, and in 1988 was partially revived as a heritage railway. In July 2018, the railway was purchased by Carnival Corporation & plc.

For many years the railroad was a subsidiary of Tri White Corporation, also the parent of Clublink, and operated by the Pacific and Arctic Railway and Navigation Company (in Alaska), the British Columbia Yukon Railway Company (in British Columbia) and the British Yukon Railway Company, originally known as the British Yukon Mining, Trading and Transportation Company (in Yukon), which used the trade name White Pass and Yukon Route. The railroad was sold by Clublink to a joint venture controlled by Survey Point Holdings, with a minority holding by the Carnival Corporation & plc parent company of the Carnival Cruise Line.

The railway was designated as an international historic civil engineering landmark by the Canadian Society for Civil Engineering and the American Society of Civil Engineers in 1994.

== History ==
=== Construction ===
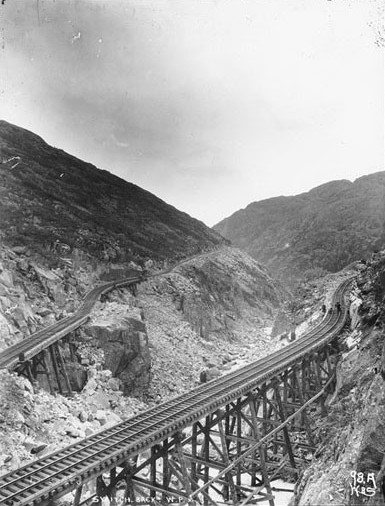
Section with a switchback

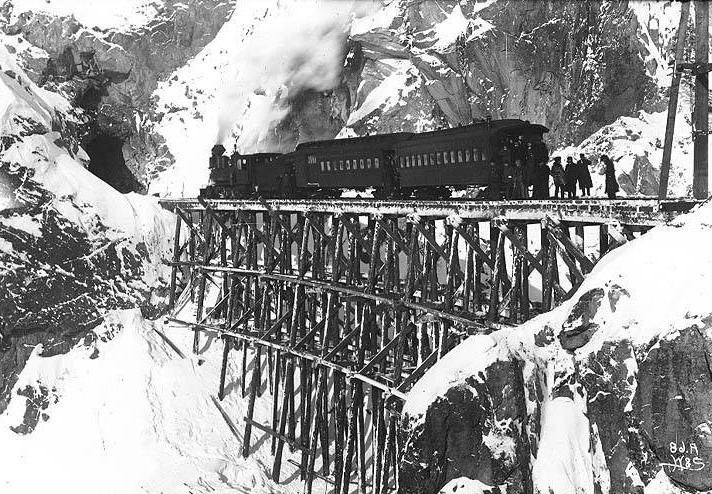
First train headed to White Pass, 1899

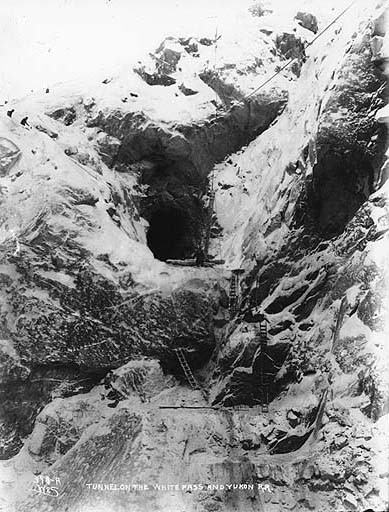
Construction of the one tunnel on the line, 1899

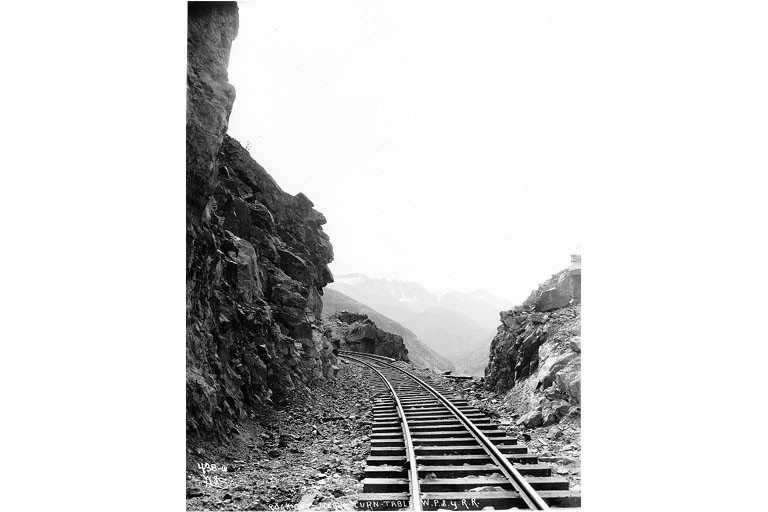
Rock cut section near White Pass ca. 1899

The line was born of the Klondike Gold Rush of 1897. The most popular route taken by prospectors to the gold fields in Dawson City was a treacherous route from the port in Skagway or Dyea, Alaska, across the mountains to the Canada–US border at the summit of the Chilkoot Pass or the White Pass. There, the prospectors were not allowed across by Canadian authorities unless they had sufficient gear for the winter, typically one ton of supplies. This usually required several trips across the passes. There was a need for better transportation than pack horses used over the White Pass or human portage over the Chilkoot Pass. This need generated numerous railroad schemes. In 1897, the Canadian government received 32 proposals for Yukon railroads, and most were never realized.

In 1897, three separate companies were organized to build a rail link from Skagway to Fort Selkirk, Yukon, 325 miles (523 km) away. Largely financed by British investors organized by Close Brothers merchant bank, a railroad was soon under construction. A 3 ft (914 mm) gauge was chosen by the railway contract builder Michael James Heney. The narrow roadbed required by narrow gauge greatly reduced costs when the roadbed was blasted in solid rock. Even so, 450 tons of explosives were used to reach White Pass summit. The narrow gauge also permitted tighter radii to be used on curves, making the task easier by allowing the railroad to follow the landscape more, rather than having to be blasted through it.

Construction started in May 1898, but they encountered obstacles in dealing with the Skagway city government and the town's crime boss, Soapy Smith. The company president, Samuel H. Graves (1852–1911), was elected as chairman of the vigilante organization that was trying to expel Soapy and his gang of confidence men and rogues. On the evening of July 8, 1898, Soapy Smith was killed in the Shootout on Juneau Wharf with guards at one of the vigilante's meetings. Samuel Graves witnessed the shooting. The railroad helped block off the escape routes of the gang, aiding in their capture, and the remaining difficulties in Skagway subsided.

On July 21, 1898, an excursion train hauled passengers for 4 miles (6.4 km) out of Skagway, the first train to operate in Alaska. On July 30, 1898, the charter rights and concessions of the three companies were acquired by the White Pass & Yukon Railway Company Limited, a new company organized in London. Construction reached the 2,885-foot (879 m) summit of White Pass, 20 miles (32 km) away from Skagway, by mid-February 1899. The railway reached Bennett, British Columbia, on July 6, 1899. In the summer of 1899, construction started north from Carcross to Whitehorse, 110 miles (177 km) north of Skagway. The construction crews working from Bennett along a difficult lakeshore reached Carcross the next year, and the last spike was driven on July 29, 1900, with service starting on August 1, 1900. By then, much of the Gold Rush fever had died down.

At the time, the gold spike was actually a regular iron spike. A gold spike was on hand, but the gold was too soft and instead of being driven, was just hammered out of shape.

=== Early years ===
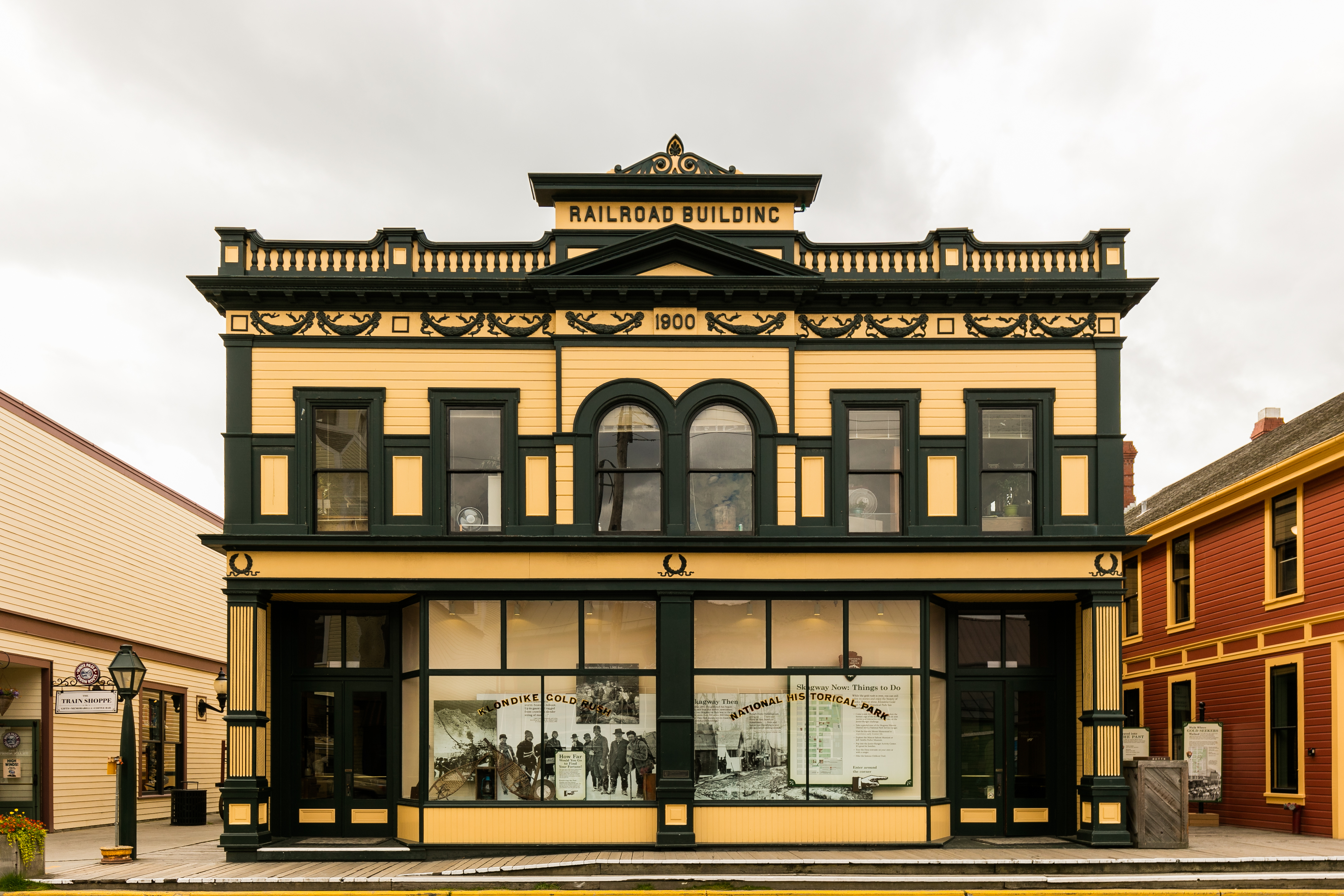
White Pass and Yukon Route Railroad Building is now a museum and home of the Klondike Gold Rush National Historical Park.

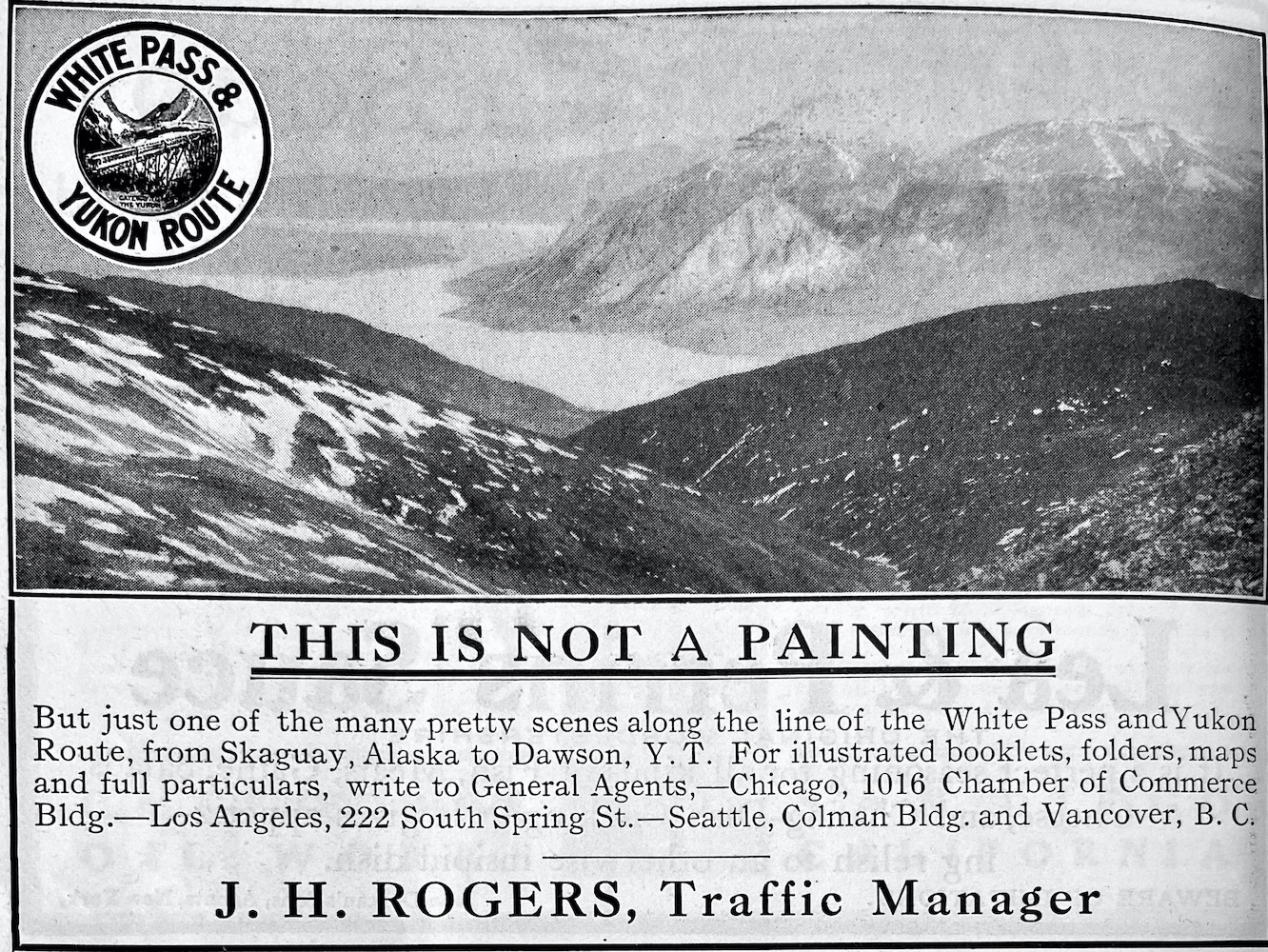
White Pass & Yukon Route 1907 ad

As the gold rush wound down, serious professional mining was taking its place; not so much for gold as for other metals such as copper, silver and lead. The closest port was Skagway, and the only route there was via the White Pass & Yukon Route's river boats and railroad.

While ores and concentrates formed the bulk of the traffic, the railroad also carried passenger traffic, and other freight. There was, for a long time, no easier way into the Yukon Territory, and no other way into or out of Skagway except by sea.

Financing and route was in place to extend the rails from Whitehorse to Carmacks, but there was chaos in the river transportation service, resulting in a bottleneck. The White Pass instead used the money to purchase most of the riverboats, providing a steady and reliable transportation system between Whitehorse and Dawson City.

While the WP&YR never built between Whitehorse and Fort Selkirk, some minor expansion of the railway occurred after 1900. In 1901, the Taku Tram, a 2 1/2-mile (4 km) portage railroad was built at Taku City, British Columbia, which was operated until 1951. It carried passengers and freight between the SS Tutshi operating on Tagish Lake and the MV Tarahne (Note: The original meaning of the word tarahne is not recorded. It appears to have been derived from Tlingit phrase táay aani, which means village of gardens (táay [garden] + aan [village] + i [possessed noun suffix]). Most households in Atlin in 1907 had vegetable gardens. The Tlingit language does not have an R sound. However, the word táay is known to have been corrupted with an R by European speakers. Krause reports the pronunciation of táay (garden) to be "tār." Everything else about tarahne looks like it came from táay aani (village of gardens).) operating across Atlin Lake to Atlin, British Columbia (While Tutshi was destroyed by a suspicious fire around 1990, Tarahne was restored and hosts special dinners including murder mysteries. Lifeboats built for Tutshi's restoration were donated to Tarahne.) The Taku Tram could not turn around, and simply backed up on its westbound run. The locomotive used, the Duchess, is now in Carcross.

In 1910, the WP&YR operated a branch line to Pueblo, a mining area near Whitehorse. This branch line was abandoned in 1918; a haul road follows that course today but is mostly barricaded; a Whitehorse Star editorial in the 1980s noted that this route would be an ideal alignment if the Alaska Highway should ever require a bypass reroute around Whitehorse.

By June 1914, the WP&YR had 11 locomotives, 15 passenger cars and 233 freight cars operating on 110 miles (180 km) of trackage; generating $68,368 in passenger revenue and $257,981 in freight revenue; still a profitable operation as operating expenses were only $100,347. While all other railroads in the Yukon (such as the Klondike Mines Railway at Dawson City) had been abandoned by 1914, the WP&YR continued to operate.

During the Great Depression, traffic was sparse on the WP&YR, and for a time trains operated as infrequently as once a week.

=== World War II ===
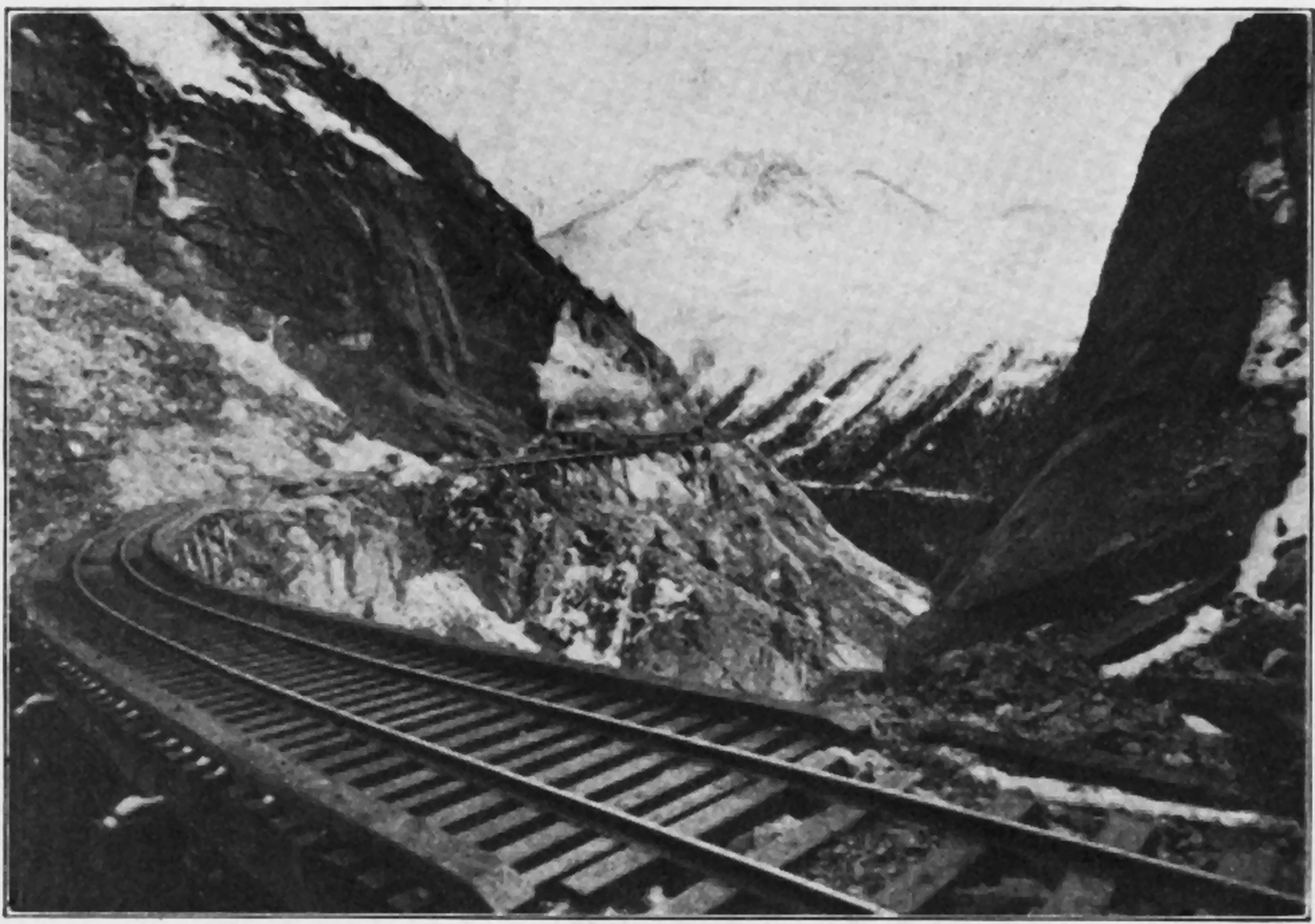
Looking south from the tunnel

Alaska became strategically important for the United States during World War II; there was concern that the Japanese might invade it, as Alaska was the closest part of the United States to Japan. Following the Attack on Pearl Harbor, the decision was made by the US and Canadian governments to construct the Alaska Highway as an all-weather overland route to ensure communication. One of the principal staging points for construction was Whitehorse, which could be supplied by the WP&YR.

By that time the railroad was a financially-starved remnant from Klondike gold rush days, with well-worn engines and rolling stock. Despite this, the railroad moved 67,496 short tons (61,231 t) during the first 9 months of 1942, more than double its prewar annual traffic. Even this was deemed insufficient, so the U.S. Government leased the railroad for the duration, effective at 12:01 a.m. on 1 October 1942, handing control to the United States Army. What became the 770th Railway Operating Battalion of the Military Railway Service took over train operations in company with the WP&Y's civilian staff. Major John E. Ausland, a former executive with the Chicago, Burlington and Quincy Railroad, was named superintendent, while Lieutenant Stanley Jerome Gaetz was trainmaster.

Canadian law forbade foreign government agencies from operating within Canada and its territories, but Japanese forces had occupied some of the Aleutian Islands by this time, and an accommodation was quickly reached to "make an illegal action legal."

The MRS scoured the US for usable narrow-gauge locomotives and rolling stock, and soon a strange and colorful assortment began arriving at Skagway. The single-largest group was seven D&RGW K-28 class 2-8-2's acquired prior to the lease, in August 1942, 2-8-0's from the Silverton Northern and the Colorado & Southern, all over 40 years old, and a pair of ET&WNC 4-6-0's soon appeared, among others, as well as eleven new War Department Class S118 2-8-2's. WP&Y's original roster of 10 locomotives and 83 cars was soon eclipsed by the Army's additional 26 engines and 258 cars.

The increase in traffic was remarkable: in the last 3 months of 1942, the railroad moved 25,756 short tons (23,365 t). In 1943, the line carried 281,962 short tons (255,792 t), equivalent to ten years' worth of typical prewar traffic: all this despite some of the most severe winter weather recorded since 1910; gales, snowdrifts and temperatures of −30 °F (−34 °C) succeeded in blockading the line from 5 to 15 February 1943 and from 27 January to 14 February 1944.

The peak movement occurred on August 4, 1943, when the White Pass moved 38 trains north and south, totaling 3,346 gross short tons (3,035 t) (2,085 net short tons [1,891 t]), and 2,236 locomotive-miles (3,598 km) in 24 hours.

Control of the railroad was handed back to its civilian operators late in 1944.

=== 1946–1982 ===
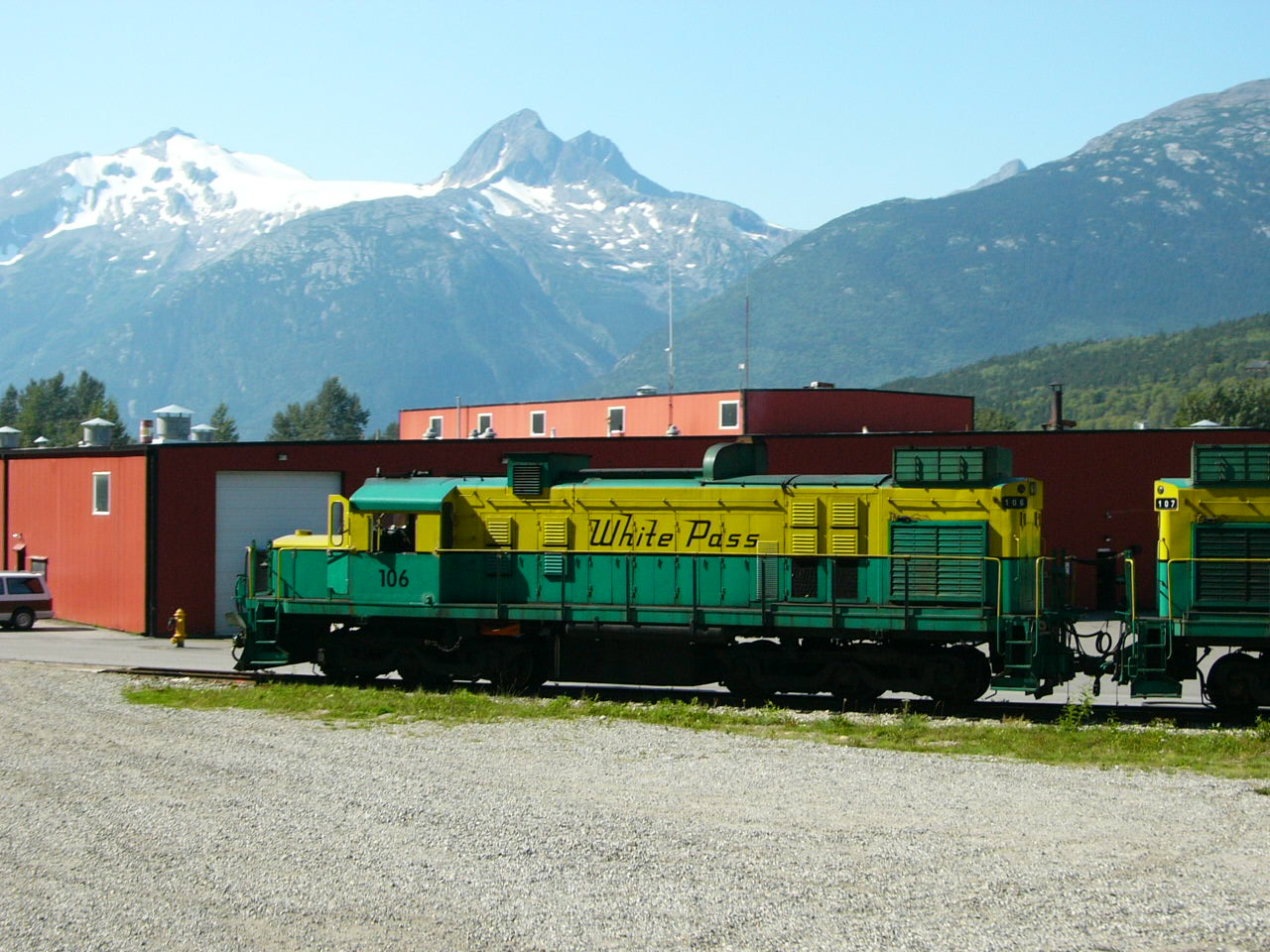
One of the present-day White Pass diesel locomotives is shown here at Skagway, Alaska. This locomotive was eventually sold to the Durango & Silverton Narrow Gauge Railroad in May 2021.

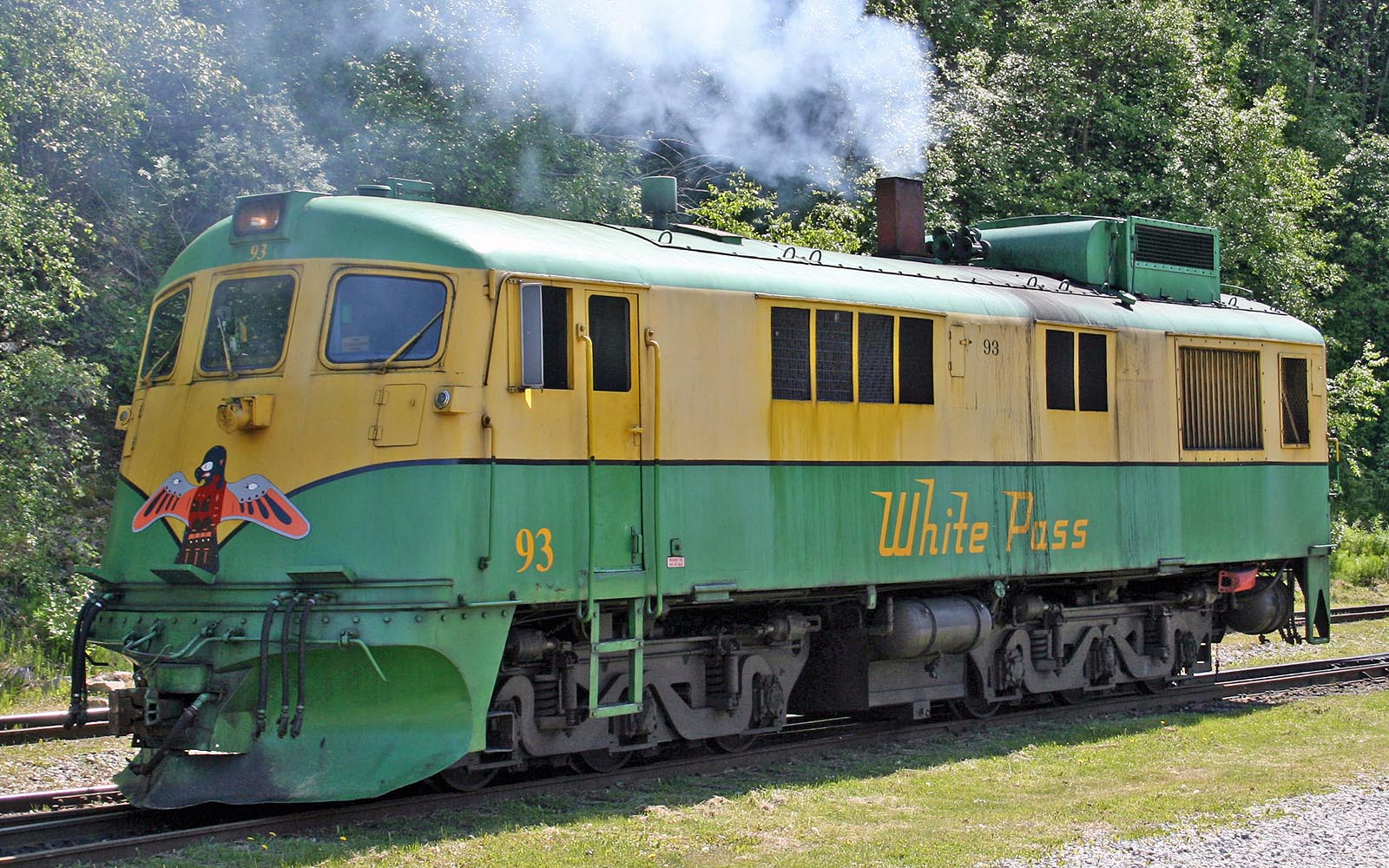
White Pass and Yukon Route No. 93

In May, 1947, the railroad purchased its last steam locomotives. These were a pair of 2-8-2 Mikado type engines built by the Baldwin Locomotive Works of Philadelphia, numbered No. 72 and No. 73.

In 1951, the White Pass and Yukon Corporation Ltd., a new holding company, was incorporated to acquire the three railway companies comprising the WP&YR from the White Pass and Yukon Company, Ltd., which was in liquidation. The railway was financially restructured. While most other narrow-gauge systems in North America were closing around this time, the WP&YR remained open. In 1959, the first dividend to stockholders was paid: 10 cents per share.

The railroad began dieselizing in the mid to late 1950s: one of the few North American narrow-gauge railroads to do so. The railroad bought shovelnose diesels from General Electric, and later road-switchers from American Locomotive Company (ALCO) and Montreal Locomotive Works, as well as a few small switchers. On June 30, 1964, both Nos. 72 and 73 were retired from revenue service and replaced by diesels.

The railroad was an early pioneer of intermodal freight traffic, commonly called containerization; advertising of the time referred to it as the Container Route. The WP&YR owned an early container ship (Clifford J. Rogers, built in 1955), and in 1956 introduced containers, although these were far smaller than the truck-sized containers that came into use in the United States in 1956 and could not readily be handed off to other railroads or ship lines.

The Faro lead-zinc mine opened in 1969. The railway was upgraded with seven new 1,200 hp (890 kW) locomotives from ALCO, new freight cars, ore buckets, a straddle carrier at Whitehorse to transfer from the railway's new fleet of trucks, a new ore dock at Skagway, and assorted work on the rail line to improve alignment. In the fall of 1969, a new tunnel and bridge that bypassed Dead Horse Gulch were built to replace the tall steel cantilever bridge that could not carry the heavier trains. This enormous investment made the company dependent on continued ore traffic to earn the revenue, and left the railway vulnerable to loss of that ore-carrying business.

As well, passenger traffic on the WP&YR was increasing as cruise ships started to visit Alaska's Inside Passage. There was no road from Skagway to Whitehorse until 1978. Even after the road was built, the White Pass still survived on the ore traffic from the mines.

During this time, the green-yellow engine color scheme, with a thunderbird on the front, was replaced with blue, patterned with black and white. (The green-yellow scheme was restored in the early 1990s, along with the thunderbird. As of 2005, however, one engine still had the blue color scheme. The steam engines, however, remained basic black.)

In April 1982, No. 73 was eventually restored to operating condition and began hauling excursion trains for the railroad on May 29.

That same year, metal prices plunged, striking with devastating effect on the mines that were the White Pass and Yukon Route's main customers. Many, including the Faro lead-zinc mine, closed down, and, with that traffic gone, the White Pass was doomed as a commercial railroad. Hopeful of a reopening, the railway ran at a significant loss for several months, carrying only passengers. However, the railway closed down on October 7, 1982.

Some of the road's ALCO diesels were sold to a railroad in Colombia, and three (out of four, and one of these was wrecked) of the newer ALCO diesels built by and in storage with ALCO's Canadian licensee MLW (Montreal Locomotive Works) were sold to US Gypsum in Plaster City, California. Only one of these modern narrow-gauge diesels, the last narrow-gauge diesel locomotives built for a North American customer, was delivered to the White Pass. The five diesels sold to Colombia were not used there as they were too heavy, and were re-acquired in 1999; one was nearly lost at sea during a storm as it broke loose on the barge and slowly rolled towards the edge.

The railway was the focus of the first episode of the BBC Television series Great Little Railways in 1983.

== Heritage railway: 1988–present ==
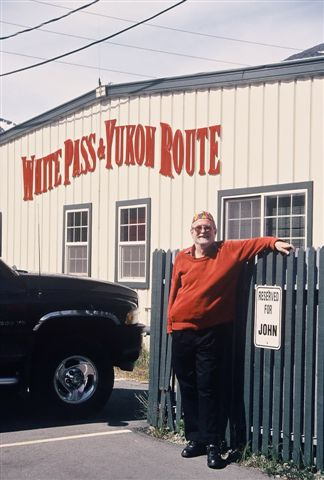
White Pass & Yukon Route. 2004

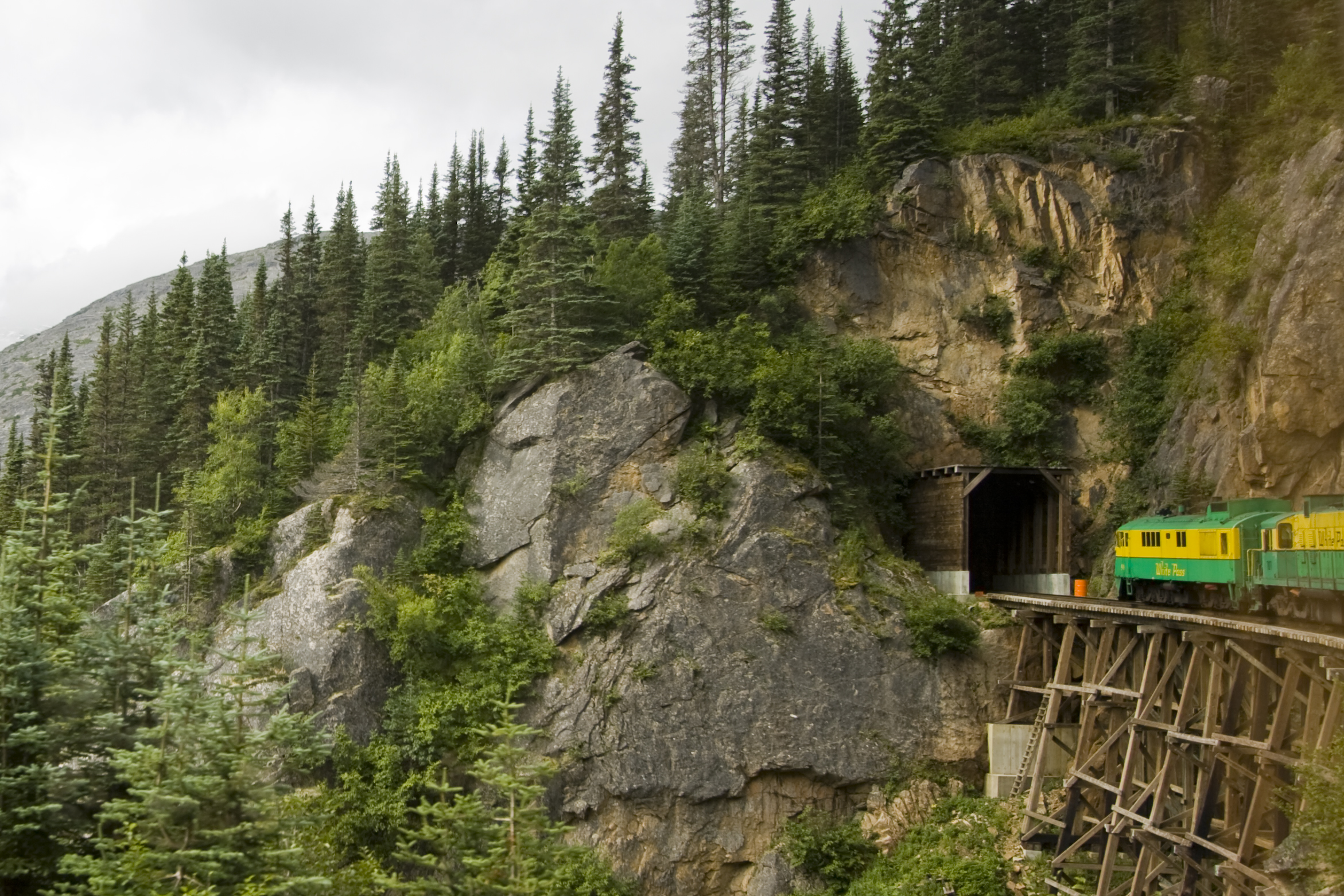
Train entering the tunnel

The shutdown was not for long. Tourism to Alaska began to increase, with many cruise ships stopping at Skagway. The scenery of the White Pass route was seen as a tourist draw and the rails of the White Pass & Yukon Route were laid down to the docks and along them for the former freight and cruise ship traffic. Cruise operators, recognizing the line's historic appeal to their passengers, pushed for its re-opening as a heritage railway. The White Pass was well-positioned for train rides through the mountains to cruise ship tourists, running along the docks at the port.

Following a deal between White Pass and the United Transportation Union, representing Alaska employees of the road, the White Pass Route was reopened between Skagway and White Pass in 1988 purely for tourist passenger traffic. The White Pass Route also bid on the ore-haul from the newly reopened Faro mine, but its price was considerably higher than road haulage over the Klondike Highway.

The railway still uses vintage parlor cars, the oldest four built in 1881 and predating WP&YR by 17 years, and four new cars built in 2007 follow the same 19th-century design. At least eight cars have wheelchair lifts. A work train reached Whitehorse on September 22, 1988, its intent being to haul two locomotives, parked in Whitehorse for six years, to Skagway to be overhauled and used on the tourist trains. While in Whitehorse for approximately one week, it hauled the parked rolling stock – flatcars, tankers and a caboose – out of the downtown area's sidings, and the following year, they were hauled further south, many eventually sold. Most of the tracks in downtown Whitehorse have now been torn up, and the line's terminus is six city blocks south of the old train depot at First Avenue and Main Street. A single new track along the waterfront enables the operation of the Whitehorse Waterfront Trolley, a tourist line run by a local historical society.

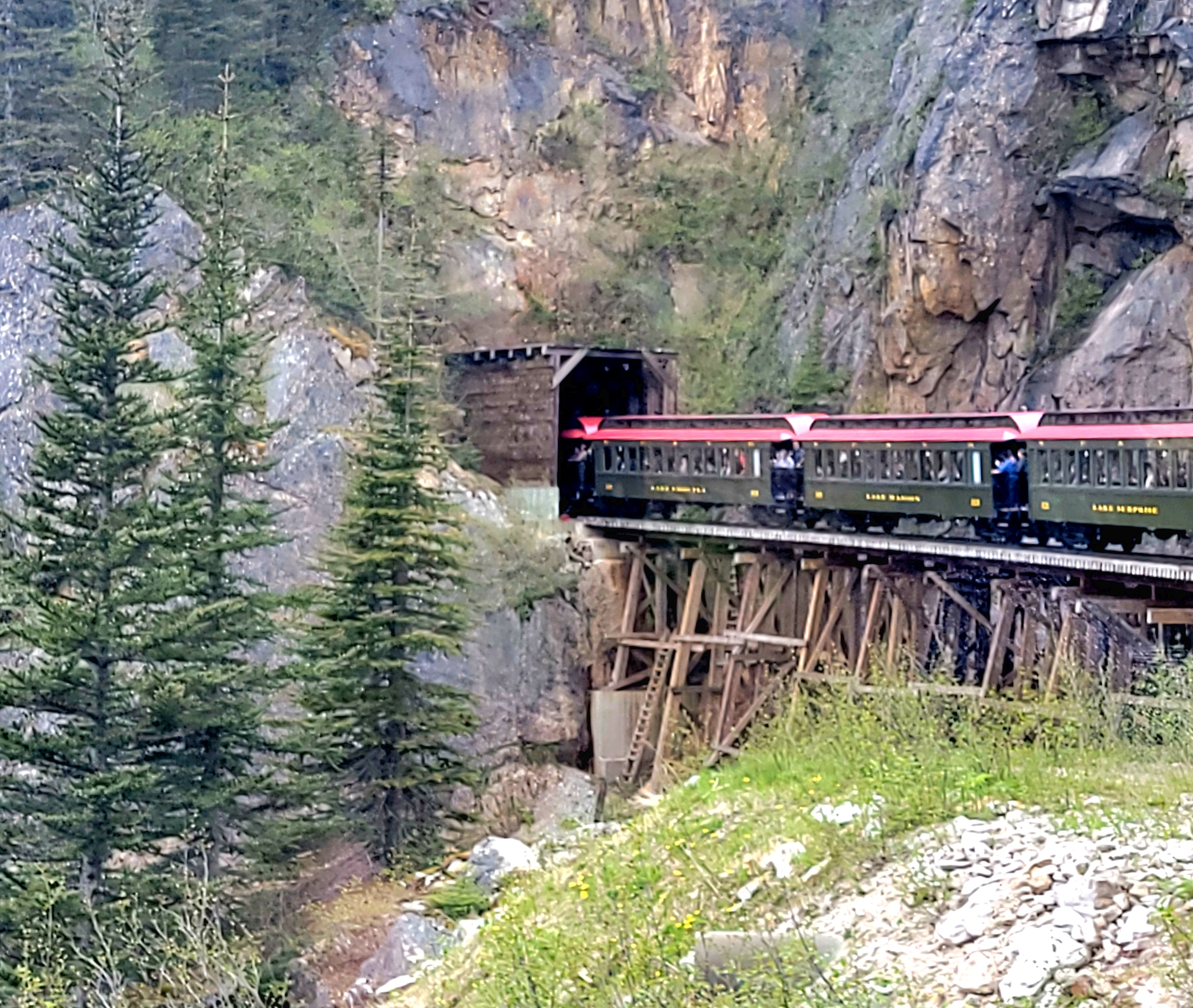
White Pass and Yukon Route train entering a tunnel

After customs and Canadian labour union jurisdictional issues were resolved, the WP&YR main line reopened to Fraser in 1989, and to Bennett in 1992. A train reached Carcross station in 1997 to participate in the Ton of Gold centennial celebration. A special passenger run, by invitation only, was made from Carcross to Whitehorse on October 10, 1997, and there are plans to eventually re-open the entire line north to Whitehorse if a market exists. So far, the tracks are only certified to Carcross by the Canadian Transportation Agency; on July 29, 2006, White Pass ran a train to Carcross and announced passenger service would begin in May 2007, six trains per week, with motorcoach return trips. Since the distance between Skagway and Whitehorse is 107 miles (172 km), and the distance of line between Skagway and Carcross is 67.5 miles (109 km), this means that about 63% of the original line is now used again. Even when the length of the unused portion of the line is excluded, the WP&YR is longer than other notable North American narrow-gauge railroads, such as the Cumbres & Toltec Scenic Railroad (64 miles (103 km)) and the Durango & Silverton Narrow Gauge Railroad (45 miles (72 km)).

WP&YR acquired some rolling stock from Canadian National's Newfoundland operations, which shut down in November 1988; the acquisition included 8 side-pivot, drop-side air dump cars for large rocks, and 8 longitudinal hoppers for ballast, still painted in CN orange. These cars were converted from Newfoundland's 1,067 mm (3 ft 6 in) gauge bogies to White Pass and Yukon Route's 3 ft (914 mm) narrow-gauge bogies.

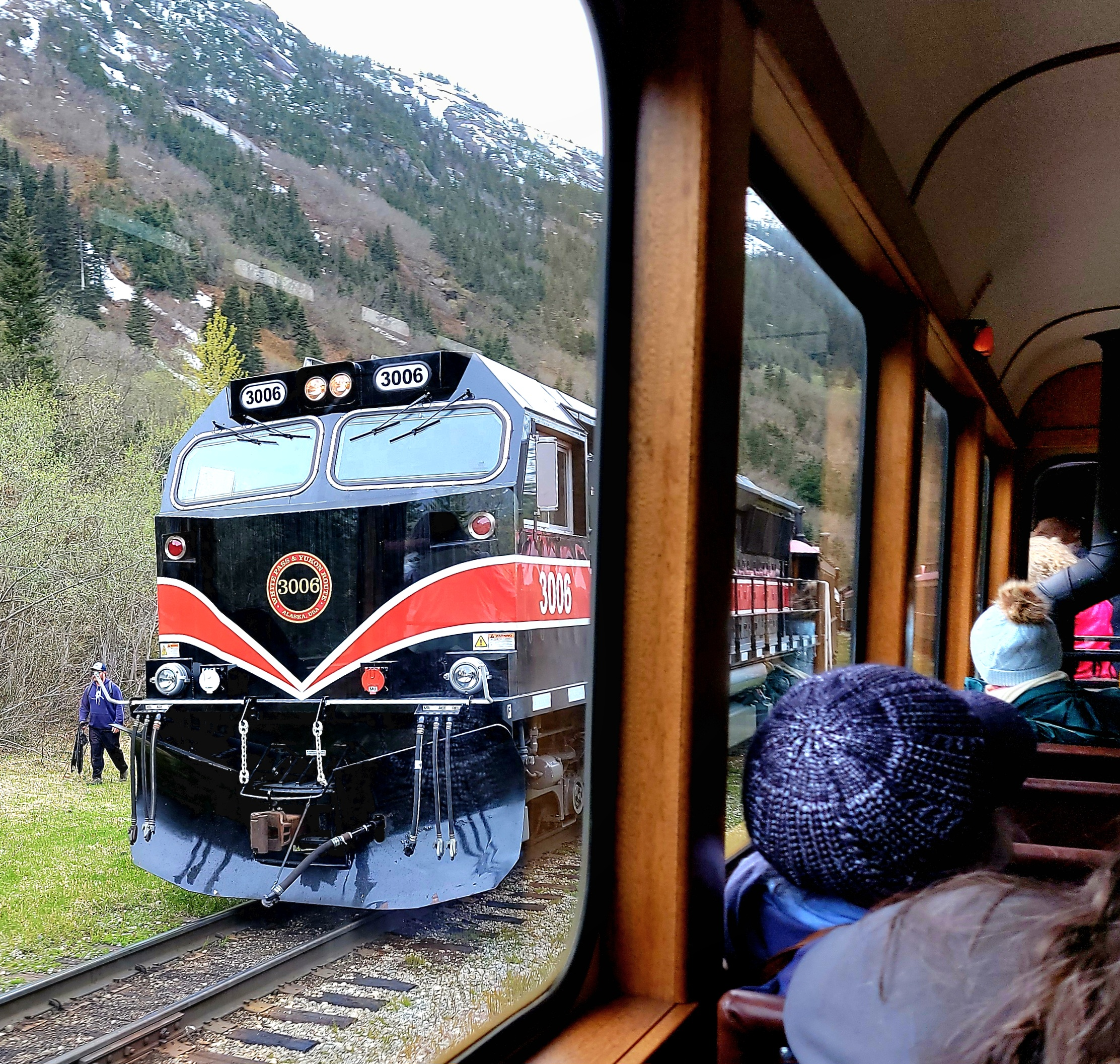
Passing trains on the White Pass and Yukon Route

Most trains are hauled by the line's diesel locomotives, painted in green (lower) and yellow (upper). However, one of the line's steam locomotives is still in operation, No. 73, a 2-8-2 Mikado-type locomotive. Another steam locomotive, No. 40 a 2-8-0 Consolidation type locomotive was on loan from the Georgetown Loop R.R. in Colorado for a period of five years, but was returned after only two years. Former WP&Y 69, a 2-8-0, was re-acquired in 2001, rebuilt, and re-entered service in 2006.

Also operational, a few times a year, is an original steam-powered rotary snowplow, an essential device in the line's commercial service days. (The rotaries were retired in 1964, along with the remaining steam engines that pushed them, and snow clearing was done by caterpillar tractor.) While it is not needed, as the tourist season is only in the summer months, it is a spectacle in operation, and the White Pass runs the steam plow for railfan groups once or twice each winter, pushed by two diesel locomotives (in 2000 only, it was pushed by two steam locomotives, Nos. 73 and 40).

The centennial of the Golden Spike at Carcross was re-enacted on July 29, 2000, complete with two steam engines meeting nose-to-nose (No. 73 and No. 40), and a gold-coated steel spike being driven by a descendant of WP&YR contractor Michael James Heney.

One organization chartered a steam-pulled train from Carcross to Fraser, with a stopover at Bennett, on Friday, June 24, 2005. When participants seemed unlikely to reach the planned numbers, surplus seats were sold to the public (US$120 or 156 CAD), with bus return to Carcross from Fraser. This represented the first paid passenger trips out of Carcross since 1982, a feature that started regular service in 2007.

White Pass president Gary Danielsen advised a CBC Radio interviewer that service to Whitehorse would require an enormous capital investment to restore the tracks, but the company is willing if there is either a passenger or freight potential to make it cost-effective.

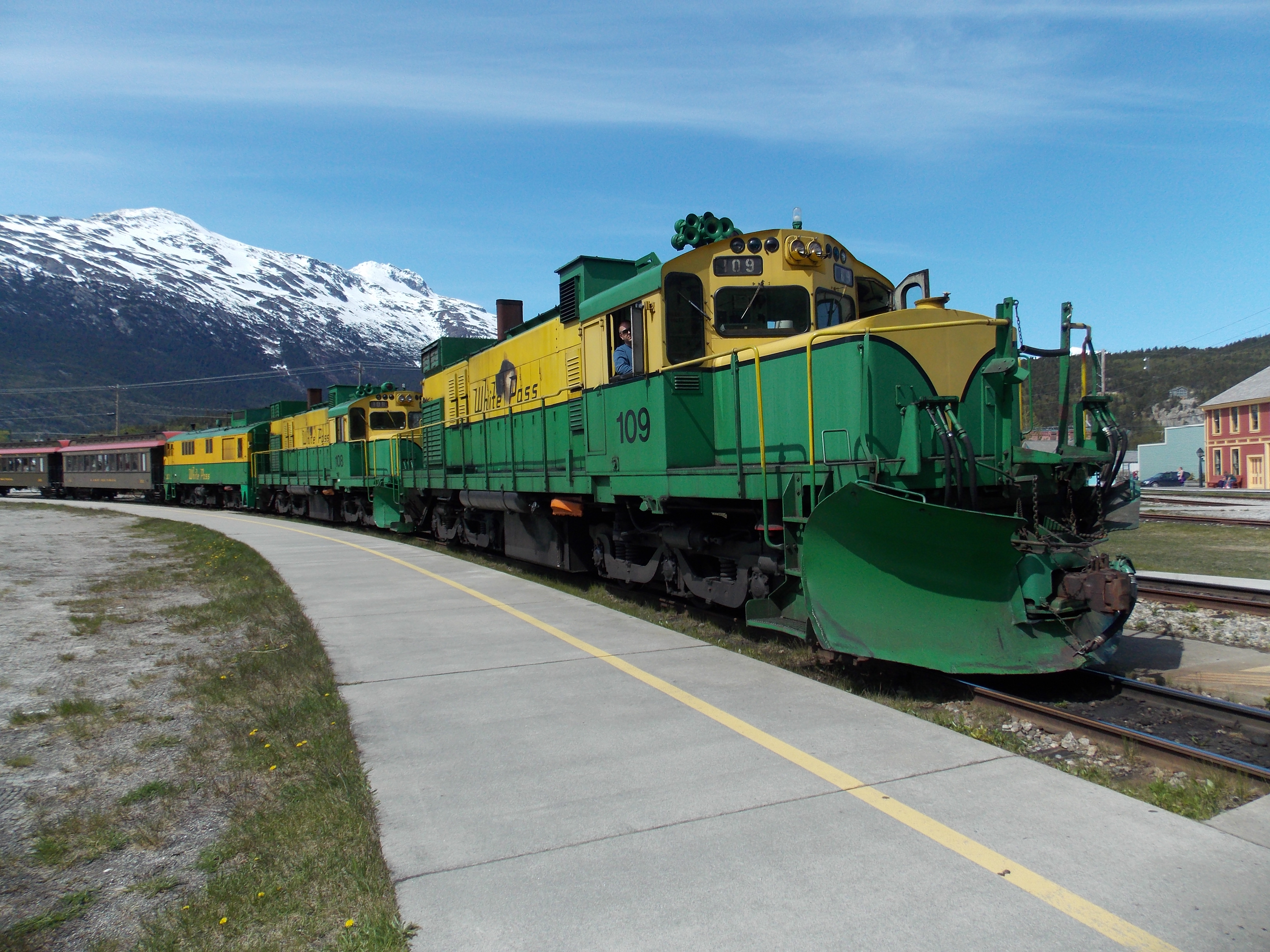
White Pass and Yukon DL535 locomotive No. 109, seen in 2013. As of 2021, half of the original fleet of DL535 locomotives reside in Durango, Colorado.

A June 2006 report on connecting Alaska to the continental railroad network suggested Carmacks as a hub, with a branch line to Whitehorse and beyond to either Skagway or Haines, Alaska. Several former White Pass steam locomotives are currently in operation at tourist attractions in the Southeastern United States. Locomotives 70, 71, and 192 are at the Dollywood amusement park in Pigeon Forge, Tennessee. Locomotive 190 is at the Tweetsie Railroad in Boone, North Carolina.

In late June 2010, the railroad and the City of Skagway entered into an agreement whereby the two would jointly advocate for the restoration of freight service on the line, including the revival of the trackage north of Carcross back to Whitehorse and the possibility of constructing new track north from Whitehorse to Carmacks. The expansion would require federal funds, and, if completed, would serve the region's mining industry.

In July 2018, the railway was purchased by Klondike Holdings and Carnival Corporation & plc, in a joint venture.

In July 2020, it was announced that the railroad would temporarily suspended their operations due to the COVID-19 pandemic. The railroad planned to resume their operations in July 2021, but was pushed for two more years until eventually resuming operations in May 2023.

== Rosters of White Pass locomotives and cars, boats, and winter stages ==
=== War Department Baldwin 2-8-2 locomotives ===
There are two persistent myths regarding the role the White Pass & Yukon Route played in building the Alaska Highway during the Second World War. They concern the eleven new USATC S118 Class locomotives that the United States Army Transportation Corps brought to the WP&YR in 1943. The first is that they were converted from 1,000 mm (3 ft 3 3/8 in) metre gauge gauge to 3 ft (914 mm) gauge by the WP&YR shops in Skagway, Alaska. The second is that they were built for Iran and diverted to the WP&YR.

These locomotives, designated USA 190 to USA 200, were constructed by Baldwin Locomotive Works as 3 ft (914 mm) gauge and shipped fully assembled. The MacArthur was designed by the American Locomotive Company for 3 ft 6 in (1,067 mm) gauge and the smaller gauges were accommodated with spacers (rings) of various widths between the wheels and the bogie side frames on same length axles. The spacers were 3 in (76.2 mm) wide for 3 ft (914 mm) gauge track and 33.5 mm (1.32 in) wide for 1,000 mm (3 ft 3 3/8 in). In total, nearly 800 MacArthurs (Note: The 2-8-2 type had been given the name "Mikado" (a term for the Emperor of Japan) after some of the first examples were produced for Japan in 1897. During WWII this was considered inappropriate, and the type were referred to as "Mikes" or "MacArthurs" after General Douglas MacArthur.) were produced by ALCO, Baldwin, and a few other manufacturers.

The reason the USA 190–200 were never destined for Iran is that the Trans-Iranian Railway was built to 1,435 mm (4 ft 8 1/2 in). Also, because of scarce water and extensive tunnels, Iran was the first case where the Army primarily used diesel locomotives. USATC narrow-gauge locomotives were never destined for Iran.

The first locomotives of the MacArthur design that Baldwin Locomotive Works built were USA 190–200 for the WP&YR, which makes them unique. The initial 1942 sale order to Baldwin was for 60 MacArthur 1,000 mm (3 ft 3 3/8 in) gauge locomotives for India's extensive meter-gauge rail network. The first eleven were diverted to the WP&YR as 3 ft (914 mm) gauge, the next 15 went to India as meter gauge, another 20 went to Queensland Rail as 3 ft 6 in (1,067 mm) gauge, and the remaining 14 were meter gauge for India where the order was destined before the Alaskan and Australian diversions.

== Accidents ==
In 1940, 1951 and 1955, engine No. 70 was involved in three major accidents where it turned over on its side three separate times. It was repaired three separate times and returned to service. The locomotive is now in operation at Dollywood in Pigeon Forge, Tennessee, working on the Dollywood Express.

In 1946, No. 71 was traveling southbound to Whitehorse, Alaska with several freight and passenger cars, as it rounded a curve, the locomotive ran into a gasoline motor car that was on the same track, damaging No. 71's pilot truck. One crew worker suffered a broken leg while the second suffered minor injuries. No. 71's pilot truck was repaired and the locomotive returned to service.

In the winter of 1948, No. 72 was hauling a freight train when a snowslide hit the side of the engine and knocked it onto its right side, burying the engineer and fireman in the snow. Both engineer and firman were rescued and the locomotive was eventually pulled up from the bank of snow, repaired and returned to service.

In October 1969, No. 72 along with several recently new ALCO diesels and a gasoline Plymouth switcher No. 3, were stored inside the Skagway Roundhouse when the roundhouse suddenly caught fire and burned to the ground, destroying all locomotives in the process. All locomotives and No. 72's boiler were scrapped in 1974, except for No. 72's drive wheels, which are now on No. 70.

In 1994, during rock removal operations, a backhoe operator accidentally struck a petroleum pipeline near the railroad tracks. The operator's mistake caused the pipeline to rupture and spill between 1,000 and 5,000 US gallons (830–4,160 imp gal; 3,800–18,900 L) of heating oil into the Skagway River. Roadmaster Edward Hanousek Jr. and President M. Paul Taylor Jr. were charged with several crimes associated with the accident. Both men maintained their innocence throughout many years of extensive litigation. After remand by the 9th Circuit Court of Appeals, the president settled on a plea agreement on misdemeanor charges of making negligent misrepresentations to the Coast Guard. The roadmaster was convicted on negligence-related charges in Hanousek v. United States.

A serious derailment on September 3, 2006, resulted in the death of one section worker. A work train, Engine 114 pulling eight gravel cars, derailed approximately 3 miles (4.8 km) south of Bennett, injuring all four train crew, two Canadian and two American; one died at the scene and the others had to be airlifted to a hospital. Passenger operations on the blocked section had ended for the season just before the accident. In February 2007, Engine 114 was taken for repair to the Coast Engine and Equipment Company (CEECO) in Tacoma, Washington.

On July 23, 2014, a derailment occurred involving two vintage diesel locomotives and four passenger rail cars. The accident was due to a broken throw rod at a switch. Both locomotives derailed, and the rails broke. There were nine minor injuries initially reported, and those passengers were treated and released in Skagway. Later reports state that 19 passengers and four railroad employees were injured. Due to the derailment, the line was temporarily suspended.

== Gallery ==
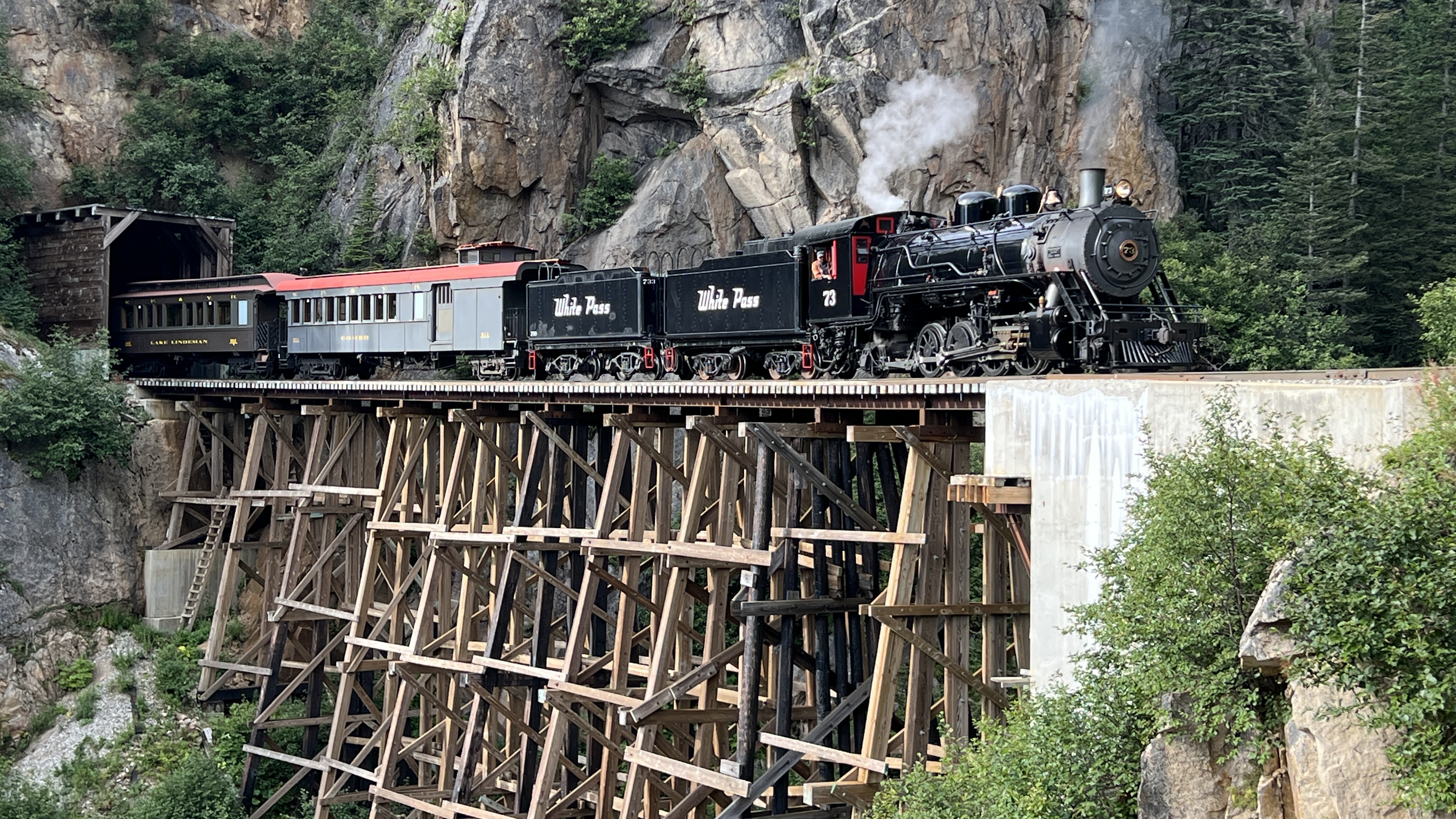
Steam Engine 73 on the wooden trestle bridge (Sept 2024) during filming for a television special

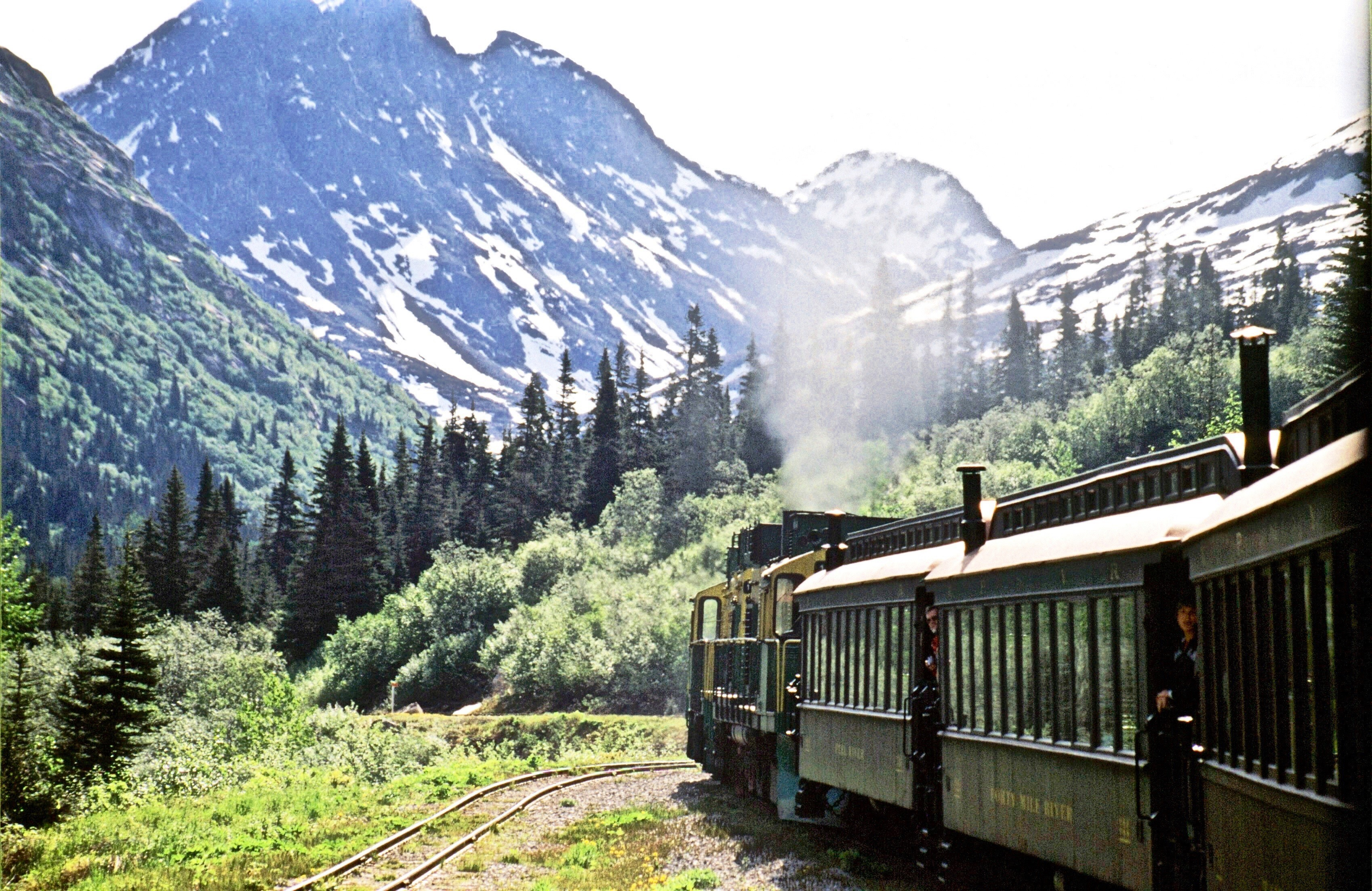
White Pass & Yukon train, 2004

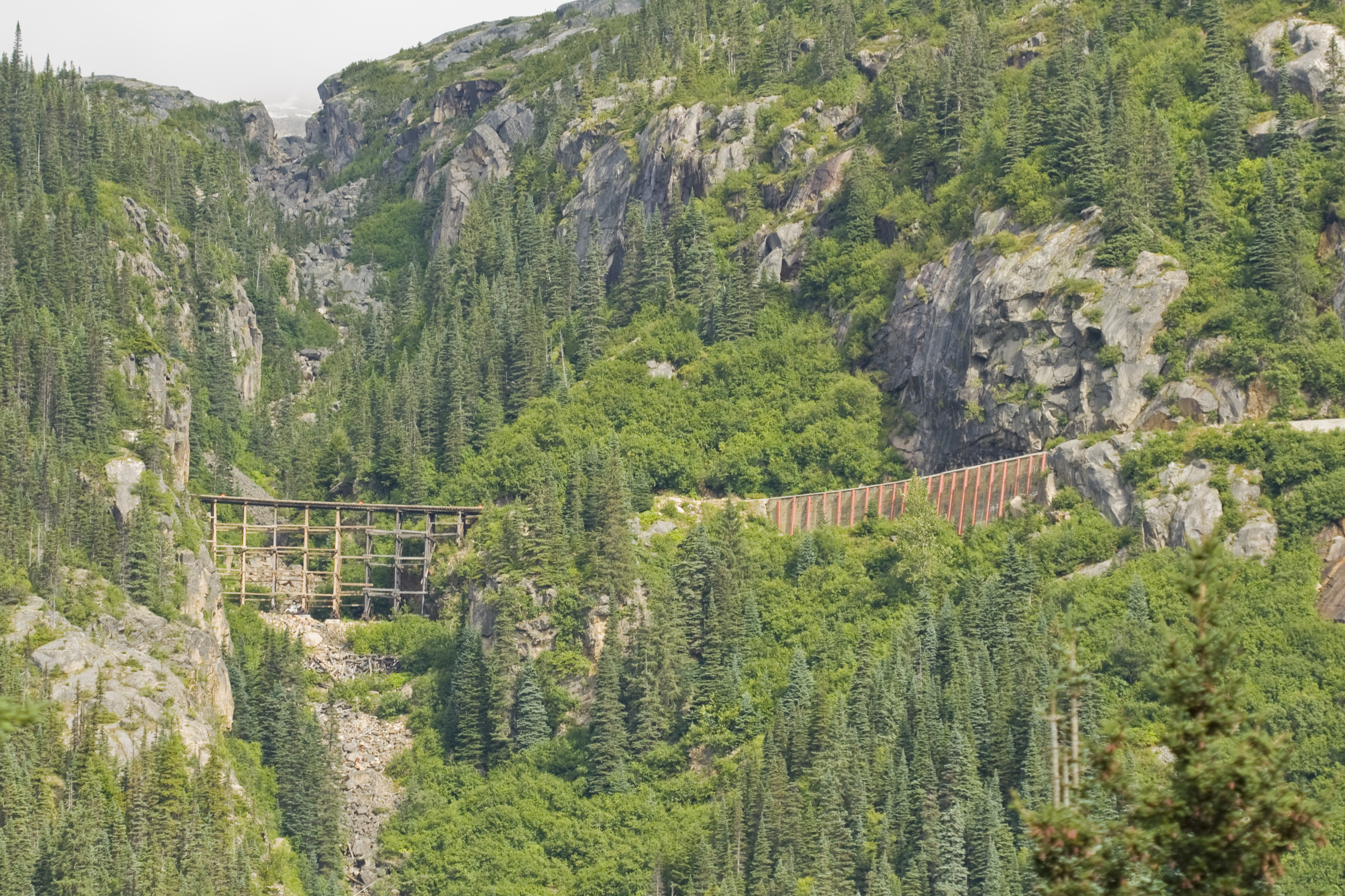
Old wooden trestle, White Pass and Yukon Route

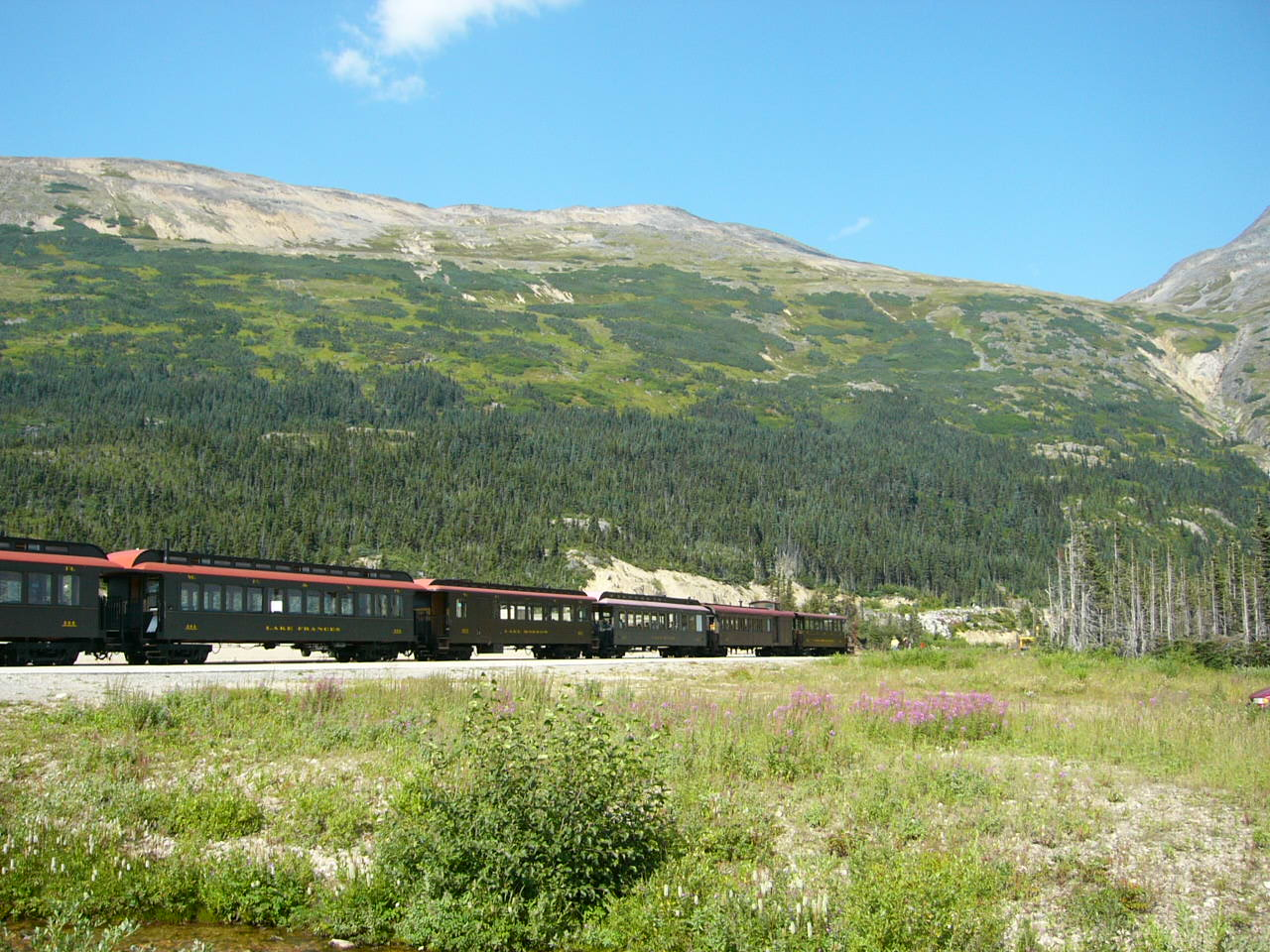
Parlor cars seen at Fraser, BC

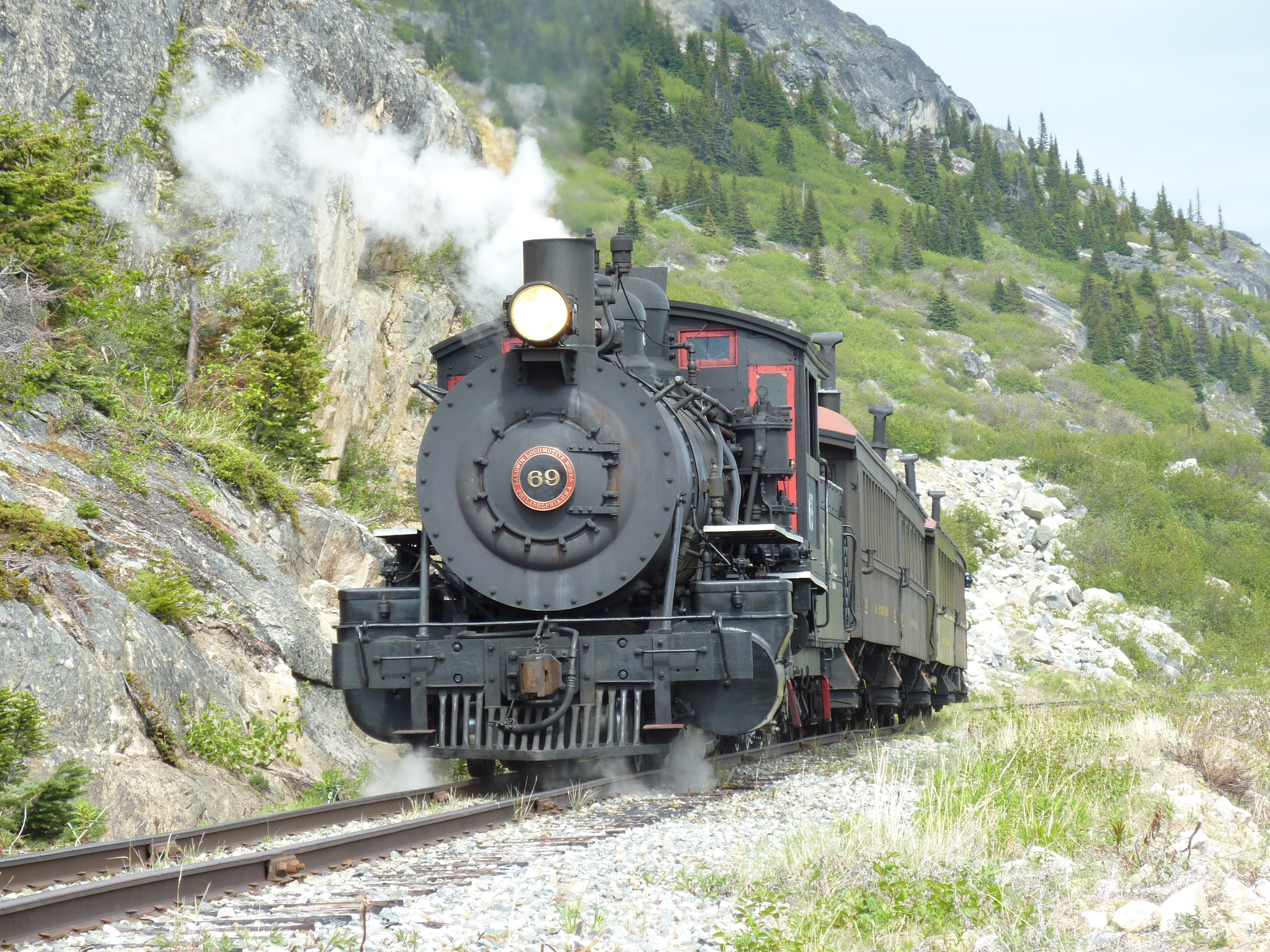
Steam Locomotive No. 69 hauling an excursion train in 2011

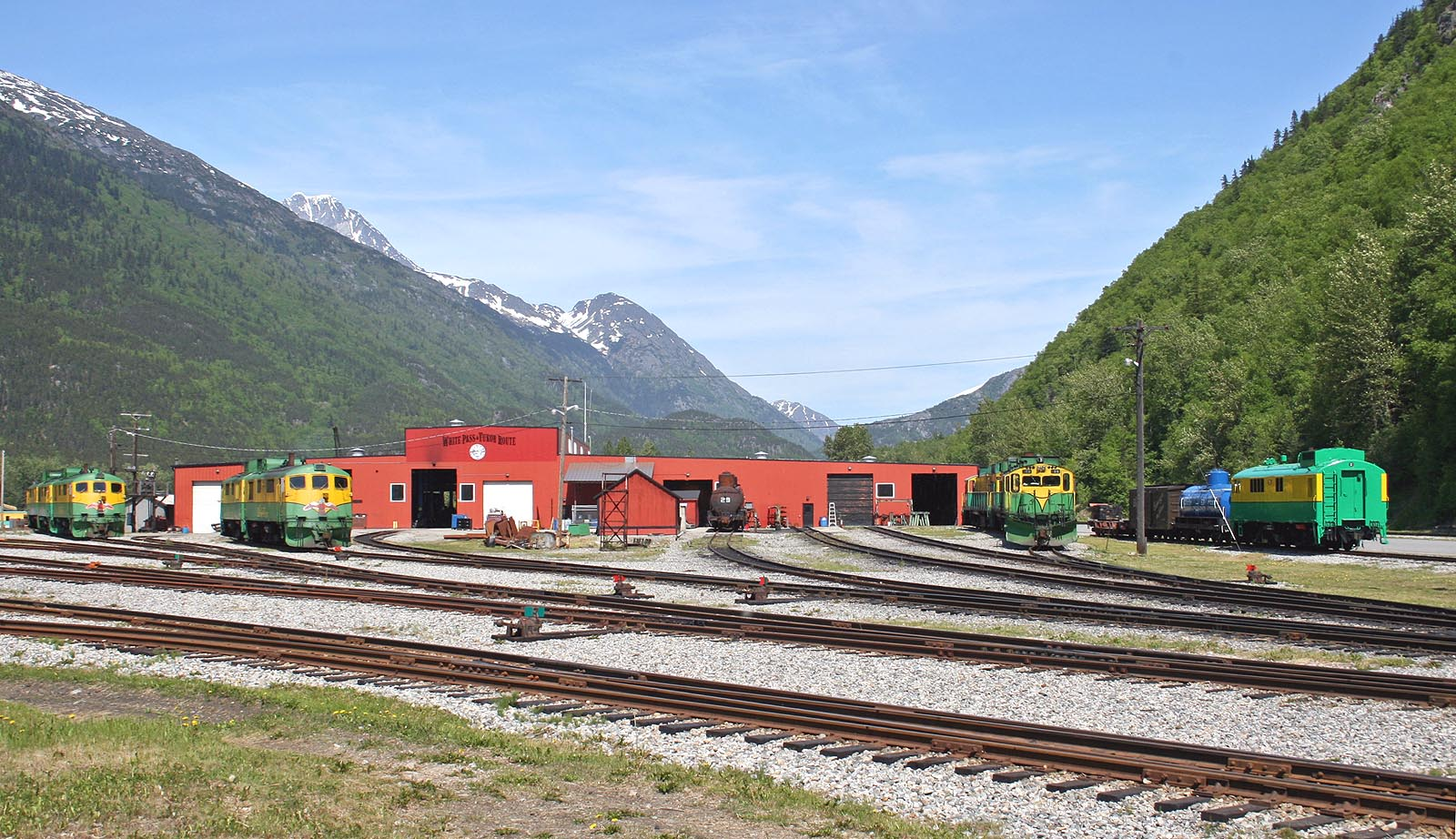
White Pass and Yukon Route shops in Skagway, Alaska

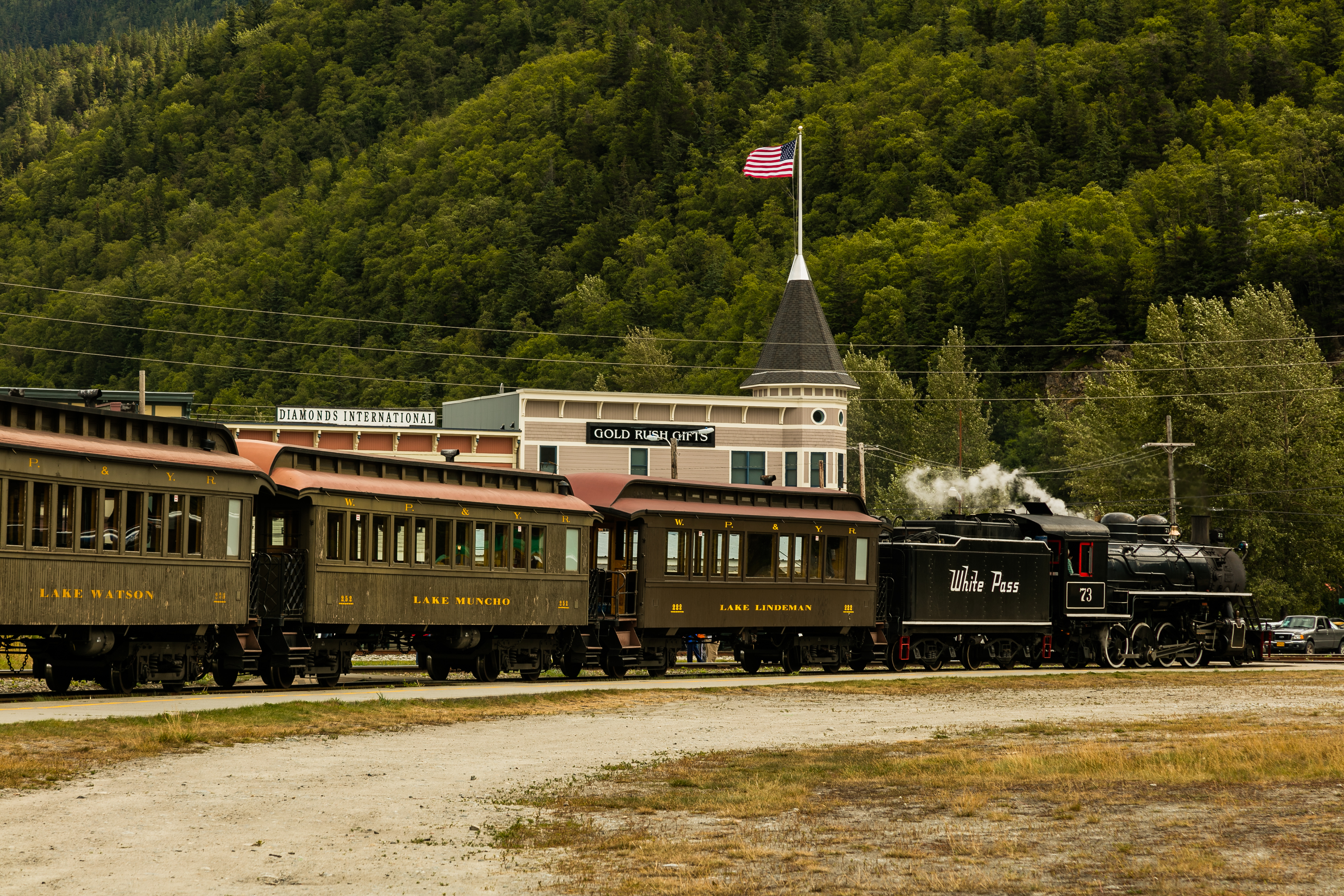
Train at Skagway Station

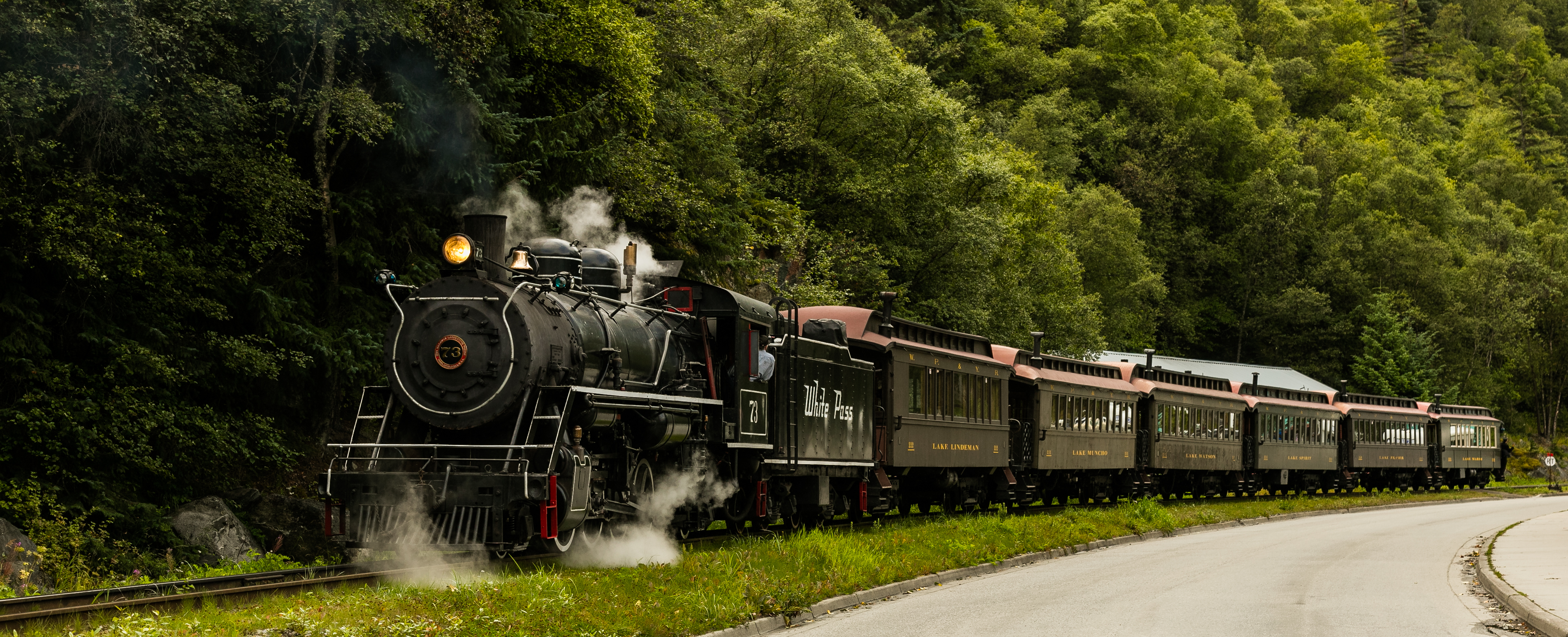
Train arriving in Skagway

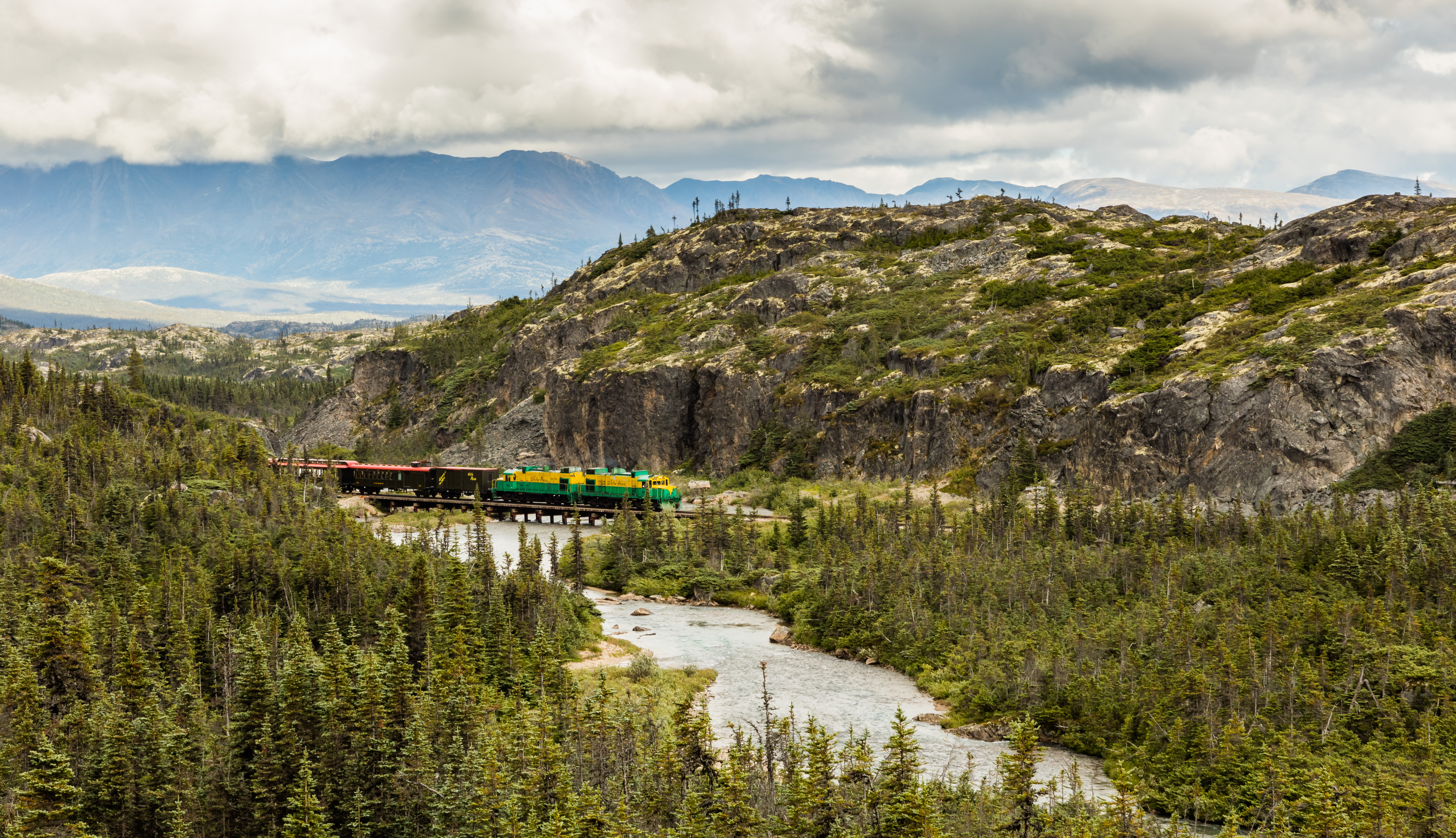
Train crossing the Bernard Lake, BC

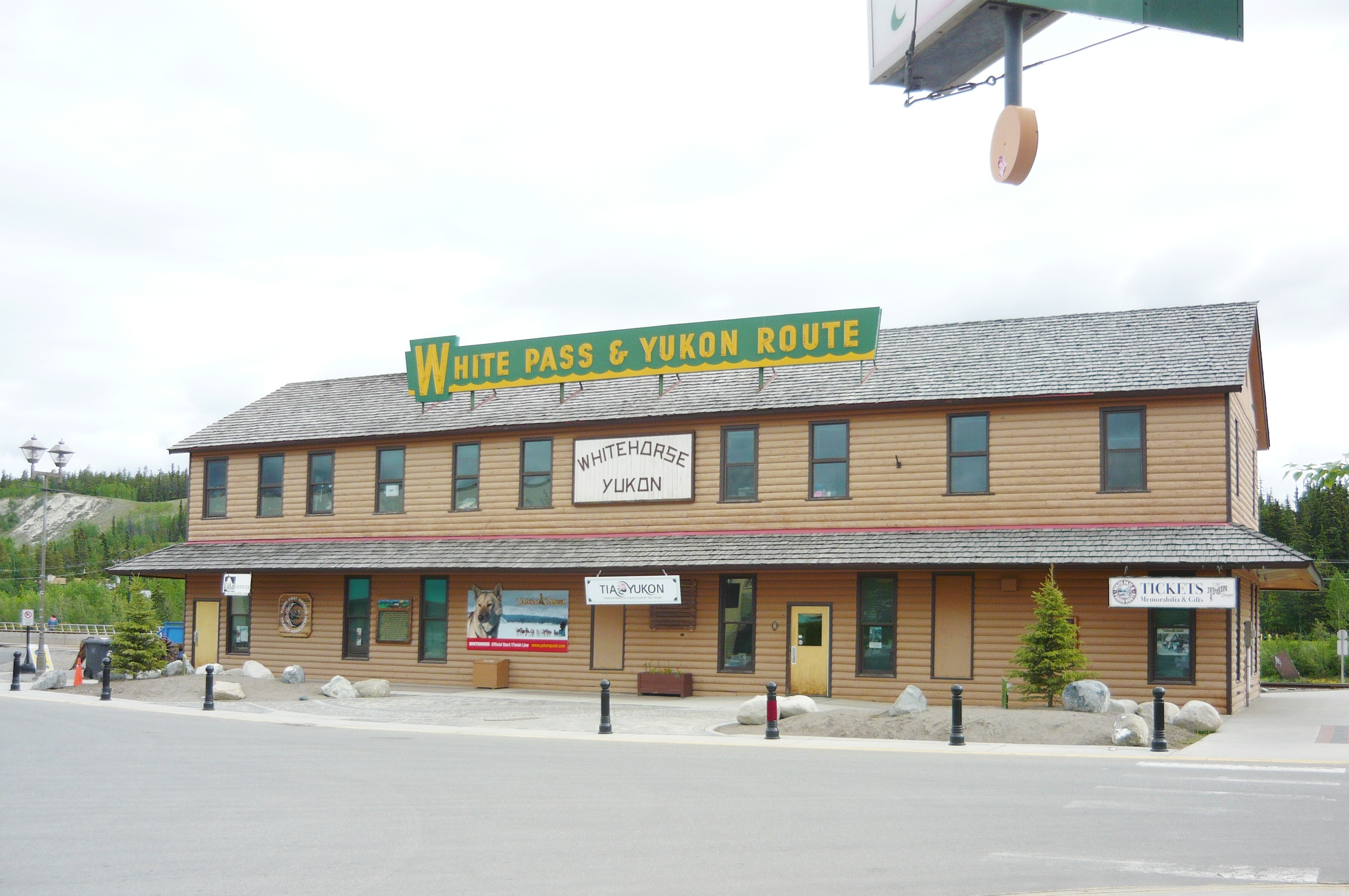
Former station in Whitehorse

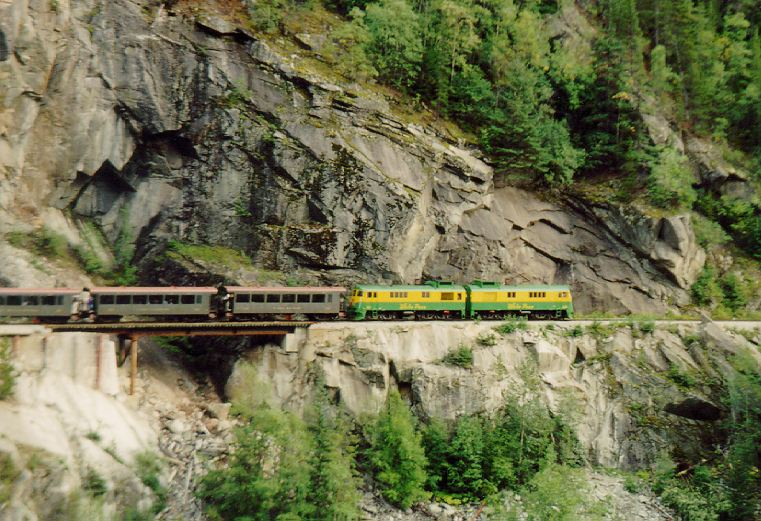
Train returning to Skagway from the Yukon

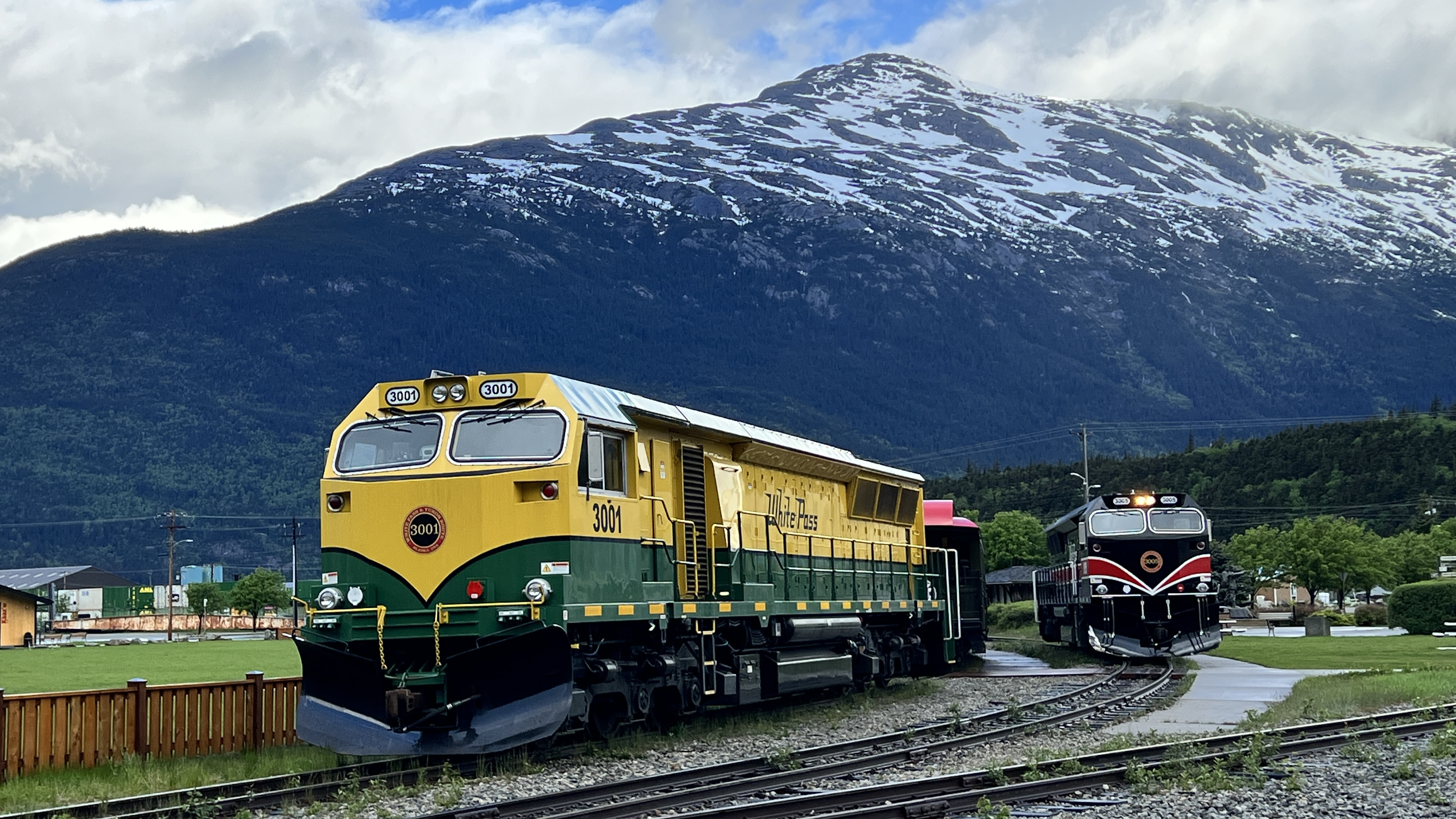
Newer Engines 3001 and 3005, early morning May 2023

== See also ==
- List of heritage railways in Canada
- List of heritage railroads in the United States
- List of narrow-gauge railways in British Columbia
- Narrow-gauge railways in Canada
- List of Historic Civil Engineering Landmarks

== Bibliography ==
- Coutts, R. C. (2003). Yukon Places and Names. Moose Creek Publishing. ISBN 978-0968844038.
- Dickinson, Christine Frances & Smith, Diane Solie (1995). Atlin. Atlin Historical Society. ISBN 0-9680193-0-7.
- Krause, Aurel (1956). The Tlingit Indians. Translated by Gunther, Erna. University of Washington Press. OCLC 421830.
- Minter, Roy (1987). The White Pass: Gateway to the Klondike. University of Alaska Press. ISBN 0-912006-26-9.
- Morgan, David P. (February 1963). "Trains goes to Alaska—1". Trains. Vol. 23, no. 4. pp. 18–25.
- Mulvihill, Carl E. (2000). White Pass & Yukon Route Handbook. R. Robb, Ltd.
- Orth, Donald J. (1967). Dictionary of Alaska Place Names. U.S. Government Printing Office.
- Phillips, James W. (1973). Alaska-Yukon Place Names. University of Washington Press. ISBN 0-295-95259-8.
- Railway Carmen's Journal. Vol. 49–50. Brotherhood Railway Carmen of the United States and Canada. 1944. p. 226.
- True, J. D. (1994). It Happened on the White Pass: The Life and Times of a Narrow-Gauge Railway Engineer. Northbush Publications. ISBN 1-896079-02-4.
- Twitchell, Lance A. (2005). Lingit Dictionary, Northern Dialect. Troubled Raven Productions.
