= Bennett, British Columbia =

Bennett
- Ghost town
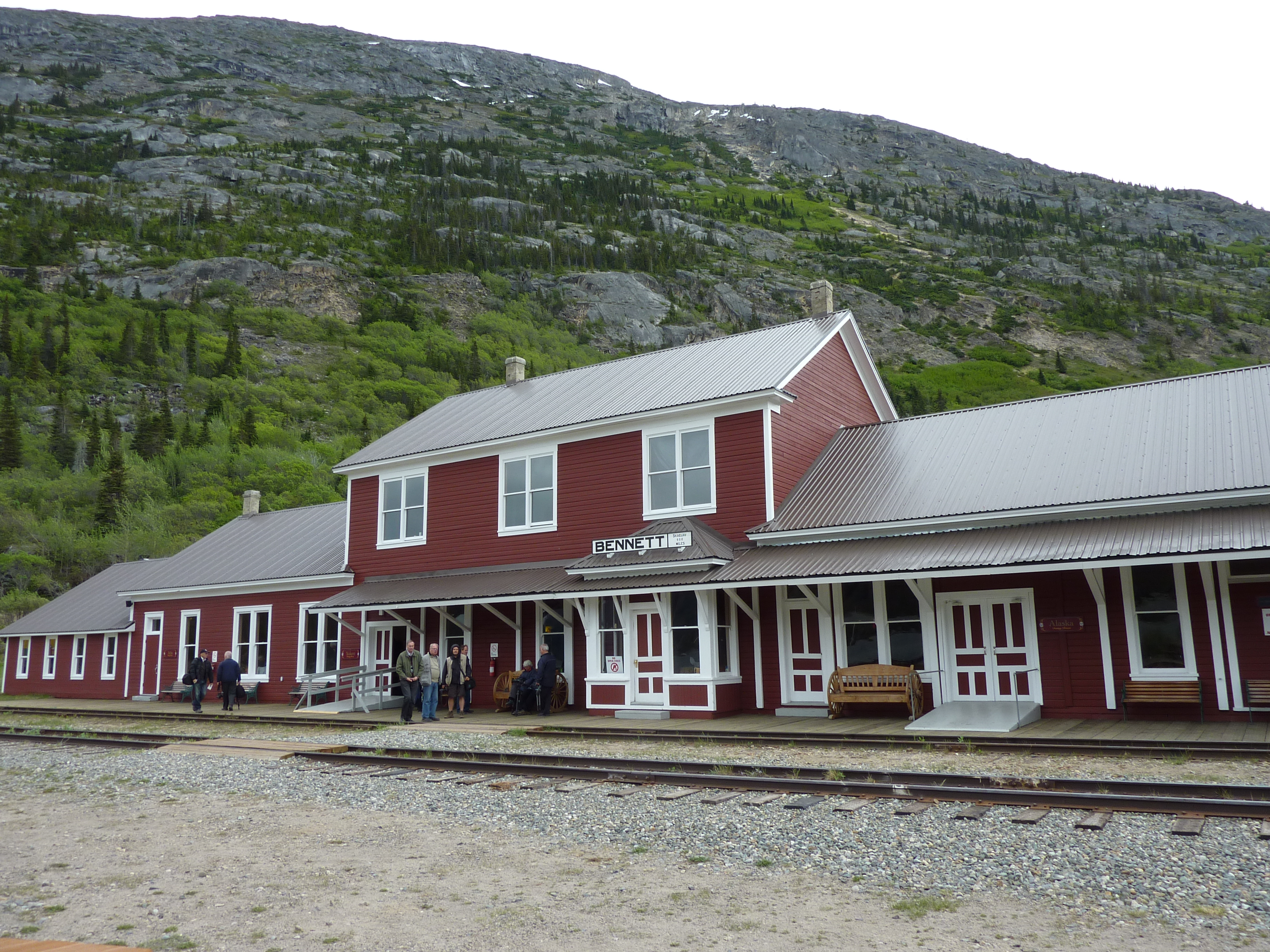
- Bennett railway station

- Location of Bennett in British Columbia
- Coordinates: 59°51′N 135°00′W
- Country: Canada
- Province: British Columbia
- Location: Bennett Lake at border between British Columbia and Yukon, Canada
- Tent camp for klondikers: 1897–1899

Bennett, British Columbia, Canada, is an abandoned town next to Bennett Lake and along Lindeman Creek (formerly known as the One Mile River). The townsite is now part of the Chilkoot Trail National Historic Site of Canada and is managed by Parks Canada. Bennett is also a stop on the White Pass and Yukon Route railroad during the summer months.

== History ==
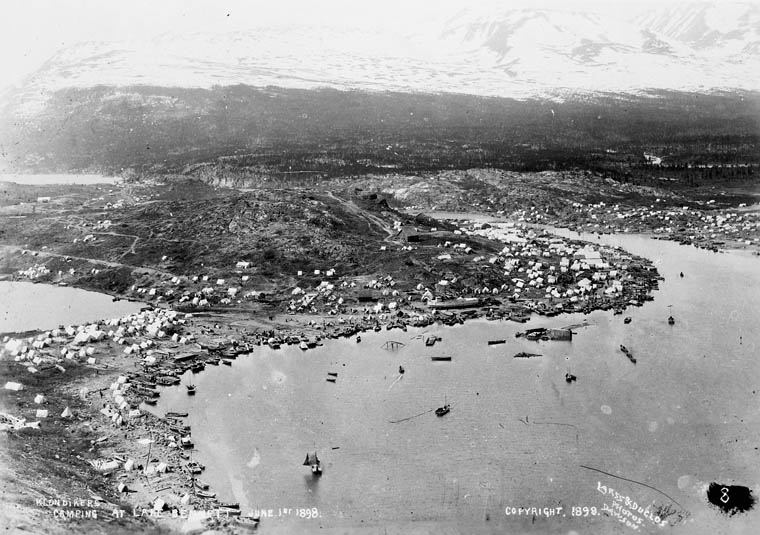
Photo of camping sites in Bennett by Larss and Duclos, 1 June 1898, during the Klondike Gold Rush

Bennett was built during the Klondike Gold Rush of 1897–1899 at the end of the White Pass and Chilkoot Trails from the nearby ports of Skagway and Dyea in Alaska. Gold prospectors would pack their supplies over the Coast Mountains from the ports and then build or purchase rafts to take them down the Yukon River to the gold fields around Dawson City, Yukon. When the White Pass and Yukon Route Railroad was completed in 1900 it went right to Whitehorse, passing the town. This led the entire economy of Bennett, based on stampeders and river travelers, to collapse.

One of the establishments in Bennett was the Arctic Hotel, a combination saloon, restaurant, and hotel set up by Friedrich "Fred" Trump (grandfather of Donald Trump) and Ernest Levin. The establishment included a brothel, a portrayal that Donald Trump said was "totally false".

== White Pass and Yukon Route ==
Current services at Bennett station
Preceding station	White Pass and Yukon Route	Following station
Fraser toward Skagway, Alaska (U.S.)	Bennett Scenic Journey	Carcross Terminus
Fraser toward Skagway, Alaska (U.S.)	Steam Excursion	Terminus
