= Carcross station =

Railway station in Carcross, Yukon, Canada

Carcross railway station
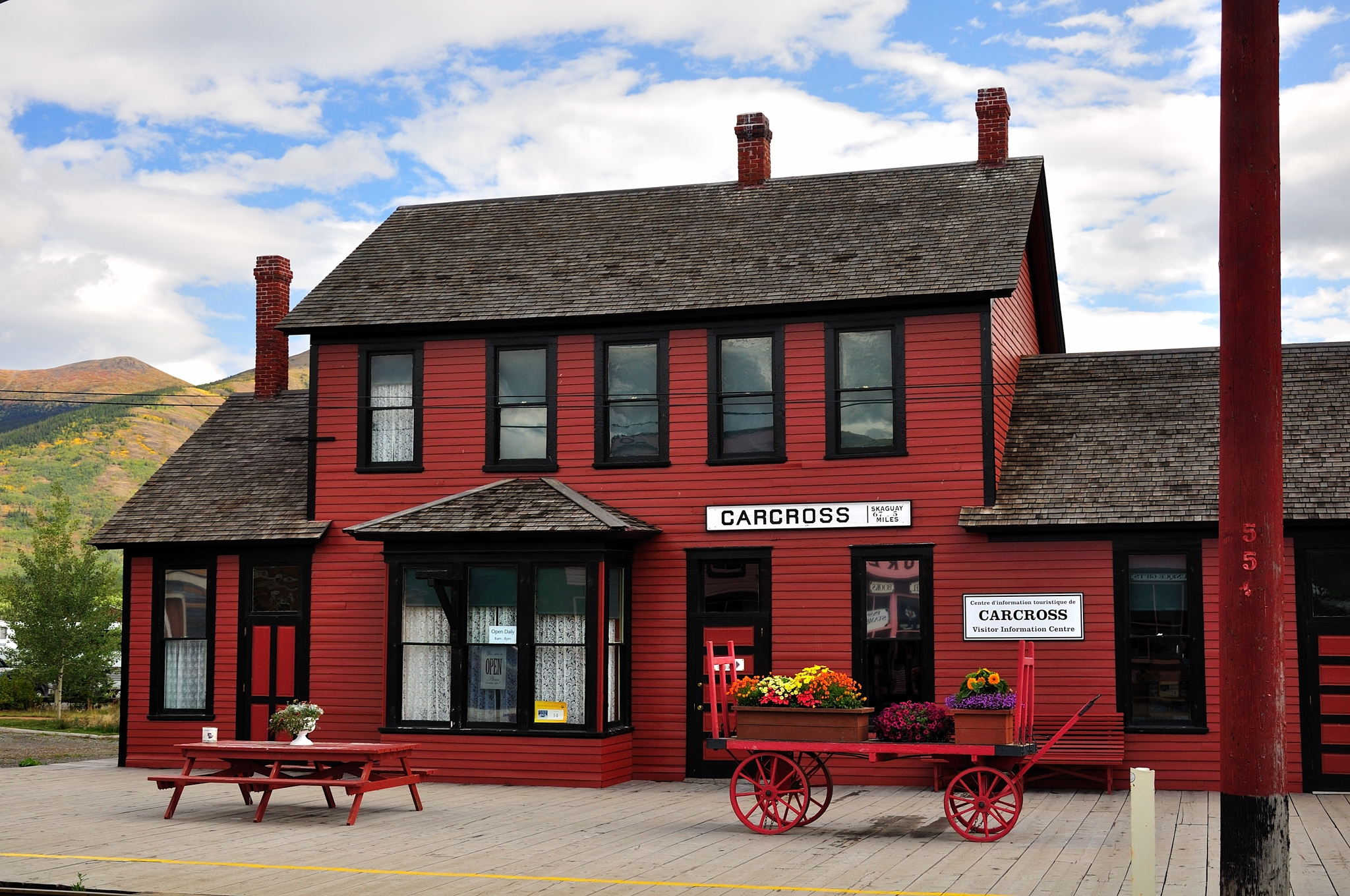
- Carcross heritage station building, now also used as a visitor information centre in the summer

General information
- Location: 1938 Main St. Carcross, YT
- Coordinates: 60.1647°N 134.7057°W
- System: White Pass and Yukon Route

History
- Opened: 1910, 2007
- Closed: 1982-2007

Services
Preceding station	White Pass and Yukon Route	Following station
Bennett toward Skagway, Alaska (U.S.)	Bennett Scenic Journey	Terminus
Former services
Preceding station	White Pass and Yukon Route	Following station
Bennett toward Skagway, Alaska (U.S.)	Inactive section Major stops	Whitehorse Terminus
Location

Carcross station is a railway station in Carcross, Yukon, Canada. It serves the White Pass and Yukon Route heritage railway. The station is the northernmost terminus for passenger railway services on the line, with connecting bus services to Whitehorse, Yukon.

The building was designated a national heritage railway station in 1991. The building was originally built in 1910 for the White Pass & Yukon Railway, being in service from 1910 until 1982. Service was later re-instated in 2007.

== See also ==
- List of designated heritage railway stations of Canada
