= Geer-Melkus Construction =

Geer-Melkus Construction Co., Inc
- Industry: Construction
- Founded: 1893; 133 years ago
- Defunct: 1986
- Headquarters: Grand Island, Nebraska, U.S.
- Key people: Leonard A. Melkus

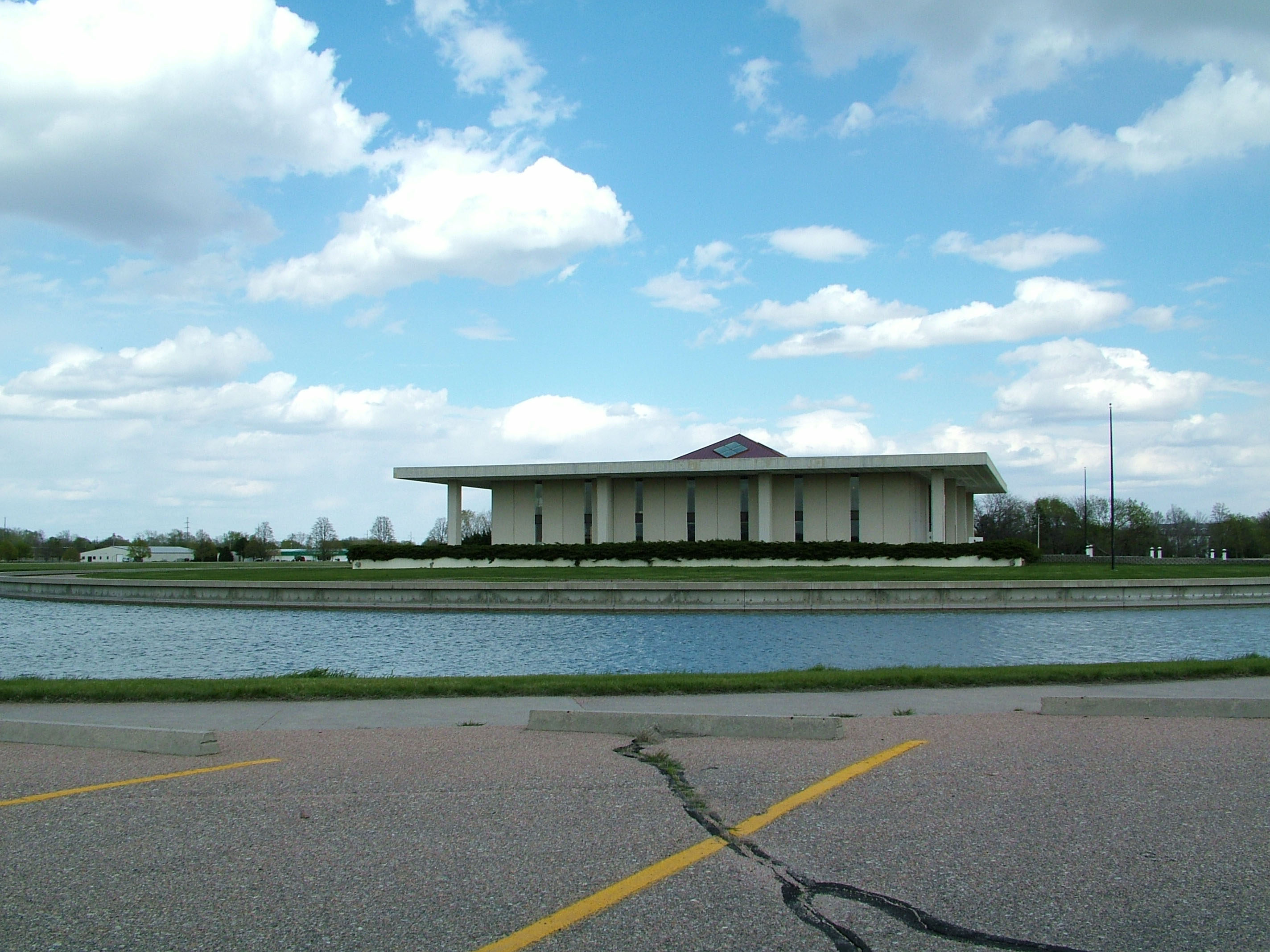
Stuhr Museum of the Prairie Pioneer, Grand Island, Nebraska.

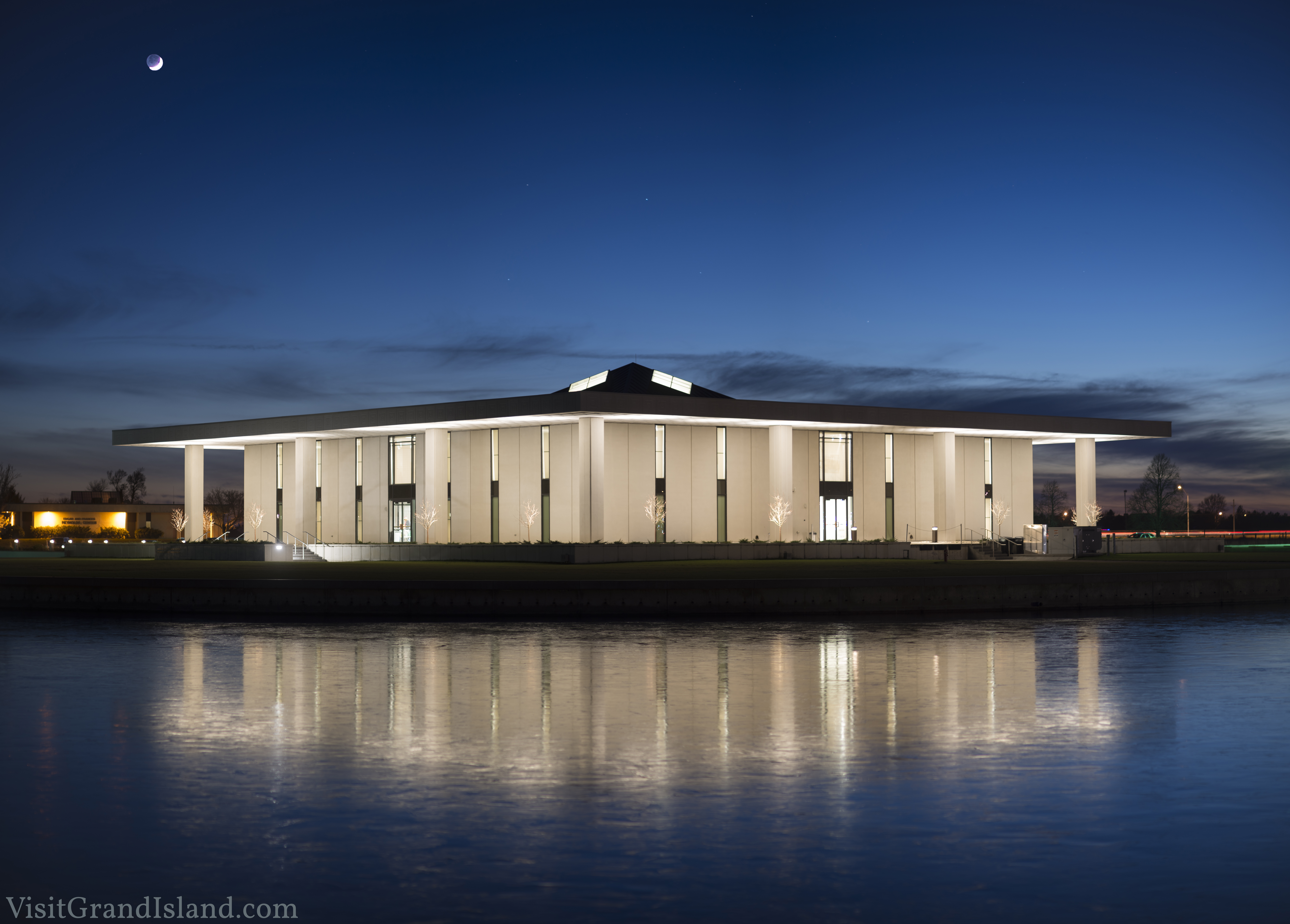
The Stuhr Museum at night

Geer-Melkus Construction Co., Inc. was a commercial construction company located in Grand Island, Nebraska. The company was founded in 1893 and was in existence until 1986.

== Overview ==
Originally known as the Geer Company, it later became known as Geer-Maurer Construction Company before becoming known as Geer-Melkus. Geer-Melkus was the general contractor on many prominent buildings and civil engineering projects throughout the Midwest, including the Stuhr Museum of the Prairie Pioneer in Grand Island, designed by Edward Durell Stone.

The company was involved in several prominent lawsuits, including Geer-Melkus Constr. Co. v. United States, 302 F.2d 181 (8th Cir. 1962); United States v. Geer-Melkus Constr. Co., 195 F. Supp. 362 (D.N.D. 1961); Wood River v. Geer-Melkus Constr. Co., 233 Neb. 179 (Neb. 1989); and Geer-Melkus Constr. Co. v. Hall County Museum Board, 186 Neb. 615 (Neb. 1971).

== Geer-Melkus Constr. Co. v. United States, 302 F.2d 181 (8th Cir. 1962) ==
This case was brought to the court by Bison Construction Co. against Geer-Melkus Construction in order to receive payment for a contract. Bison Construction claimed that Geer-Melkus had withheld a payment totalling $16,196.19. Geer-Melkus admitted to withholding said payments but said it was on account of damages incurred by water escaping through a break in the water line which Bison was contracted to construct. The result was a judgement against Geer-Melkus and they were impelled to pay Bison Construction the outstanding total.

== See also ==
- Construction Data Company
