= Black Hills Central Railroad =

Heritage railroad in South Dakota

Black Hills Central Railroad Co.

1880 Train
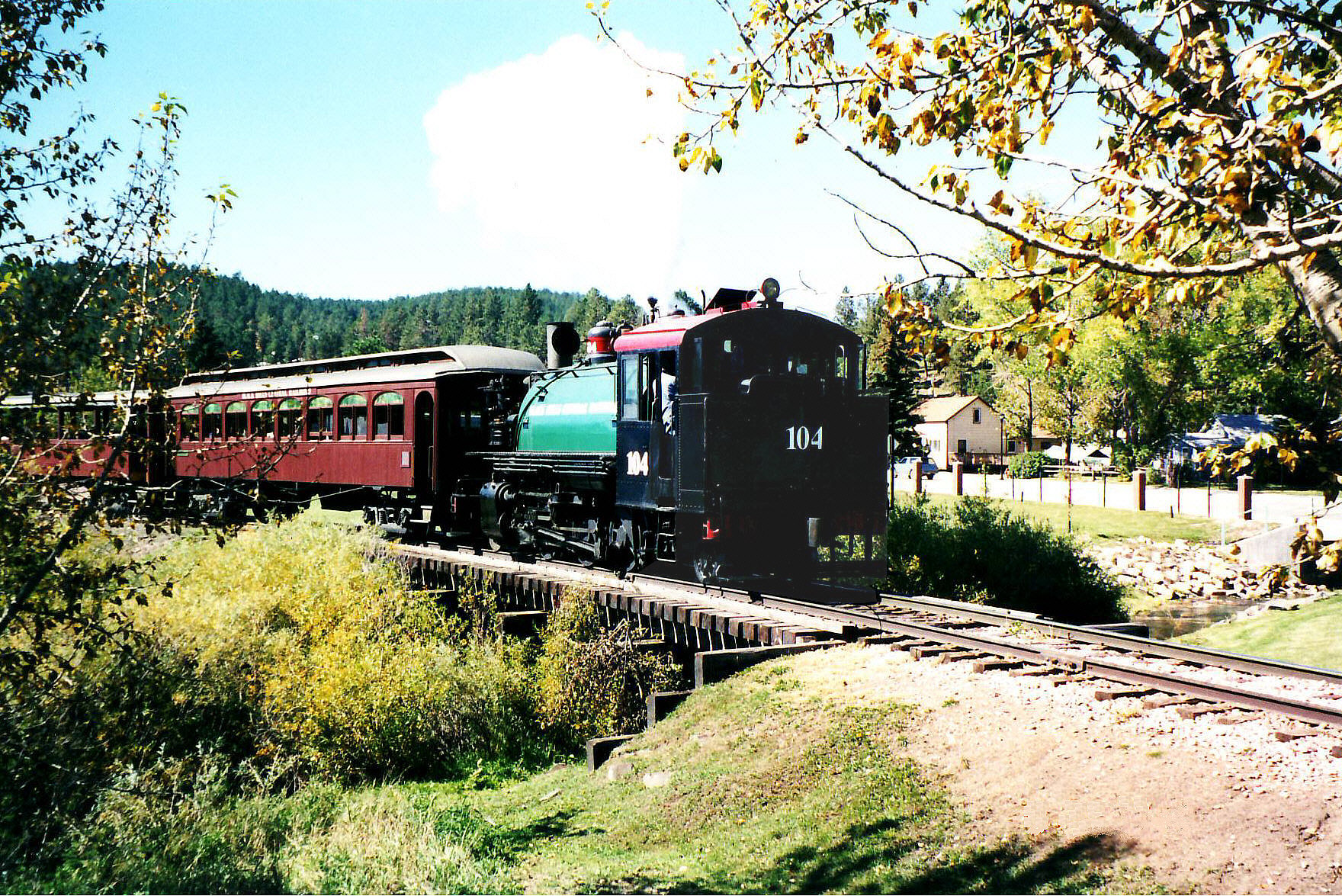
- Baldwin 2-6-2ST #104 steaming out of Hill City station in 2001, on the 10-mile (16 km) run to Keystone, South Dakota
- Locale: Hill City, South Dakota to Keystone, South Dakota

Commercial operations
- Name: Keystone Branch of the Burlington Northern Railroad
- Built by: Chicago, Burlington and Quincy Railroad
- Original gauge: 4 ft 8 1/2 in (1,435 mm) (standard gauge)

Preserved operations
- Owned by: Black Hills Central Railroad Co.
- Operated by: Black Hills Central Railroad Co.
- Reporting mark: BHCR
- Stations: 2
- Length: 20 mi (32 km)
- Preserved gauge: 4 ft 8 1/2 in (1,435 mm) (standard gauge)

Preservation history
- 1957: Reopened
- 1990: Sold to Warder family
- May 2026: Sold to World Choice Investments
- Headquarters: Hill City, South Dakota

Website
- www.1880train.com
- Burlington and Quincy High Line Hill City to Keystone Branch
- U.S. National Register of Historic Places
- U.S. Historic district
- Location within South Dakota Location within the United States
- Nearest city: Hill City, South Dakota
- Coordinates: 43°55′56″N 103°34′24″W
- Area: 35 acres (14 ha)
- Built: 1890
- NRHP reference No.: 02001768
- Added to NRHP: February 5, 2003

The Black Hills Central Railroad Co. (reporting mark BHCR) is a heritage railroad that operates in Keystone, South Dakota, United States. The railroad was added to the National Register of Historic Places on February 5, 2003.

It currently operates the 1880 Train on the former Keystone Branch of the Burlington Northern Railroad (BN) between Hill City, South Dakota and Keystone, South Dakota.

The Black Hills Central Railroad restores early twentieth century-era locomotives and train cars and has been featured on television shows such as the Gunsmoke episode "Snow Train", General Hospital and the TNT mini-series Into the West. It also appeared in the movie Orphan Train.

The South Dakota State Railroad Museum is located adjacent to the Hill City depot, on BHCR land.

== History ==
The railroad line was originally built by the Chicago, Burlington and Quincy Railroad (CB&Q) to serve mining and timber interests in the Black Hills. It reached Keystone on January 20, 1900, and was later used to haul equipment for carving nearby Mount Rushmore.

In 1956, two steam enthusiasts, William Heckman and Robert Freer, promoted to “have in operation at least one working steam railroad, for boys of all ages who share America’s fondness for the rapidly vanishing steam locomotive.” They soon gathered financial, political and popular support for this venture adjacent to the tourist destination of Mount Rushmore. The intention was to have summer steam train operations with 1880-period equipment.

=== Narrow Gauge ===
Heckman and Freer proposed a new three foot gauge heritage railroad, using the Keystone Branch, by laying a third rail on five miles of the standard gauge track. CB&Q was supportive, and the dual-gauge line was constructed from Hill City to a new terminus with a wye, to be named “Oblivion” about midway along the branch. The choice of narrow gauge was influenced by the availability, also from CB&Q, of a complete 1880s styled "Deadwood Central" trainset which had been assembled for the Chicago Railroad Fair of 1948–49. This consisted of:

- Colorado and Southern Number 9, a 2-6-0 built by Cooke Locomotive Works in 1882, originally as Denver, South Park and Pacific Number 72, which had been named Chief Crazy Horse for the Fair.
- Coaches, open observation cars and a railway post office car of 1880s style, but which had been built new by CB&Q.

Additionally, White Pass & Yukon Number 69, an outside-framed 2-8-0 built in 1908 was acquired, to be named Klondike Casey

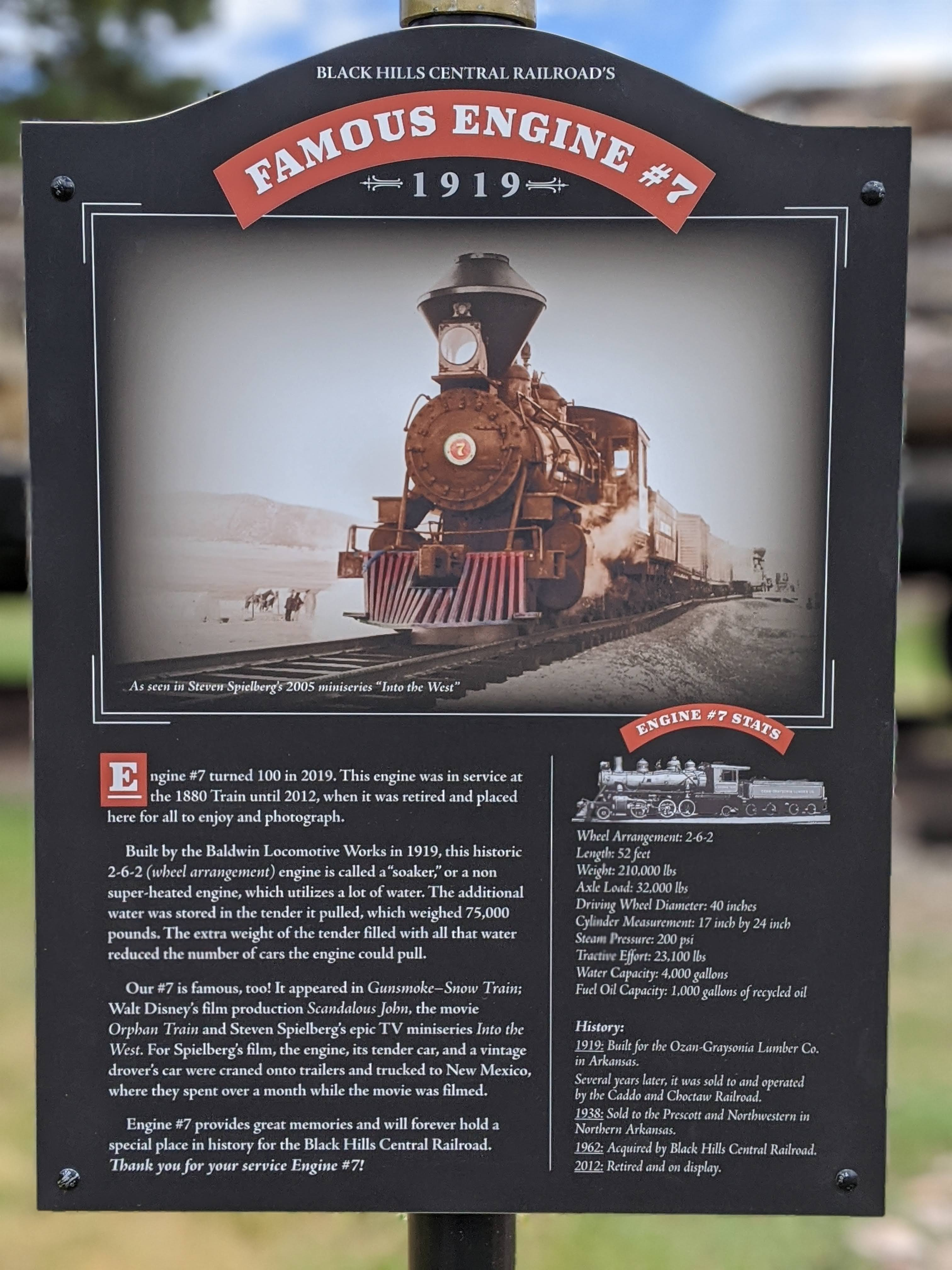
A plaque commemorating steam locomotive #7, an engine that has appeared in numerous films and series, is located on the grounds of the Hill City depot.

The narrow gauge operation began in 1957 and ran successfully for several years until a decision was made to extend the operation to Keystone, which included a change to standard gauge. The third rail was removed in 1964 (although as of 2022, the abandoned Oblivion Wye rails remain in place), and the locos and rolling stock were eventually divested to other heritage railways: Number 69 went to the Nebraska Midland Railroad in 1973, and then home to the White Pass in 2001. Number 9 went to the Georgetown Loop in Colorado in 1988. As of 2020, Number 69 is operable but has been stored since 2013, and Number 9 is on static display at Breckinridge, Colorado, having suffered mechanical damage in 2006.

=== Standard Gauge ===
BHCR gradually acquired its current range of locomotives and rolling stock, and continued operations over the full length of the branch until the 1972 Black Hills flood destroyed the last three miles of track into Keystone. Burlington Northern relocated and rebuilt two miles, to a new Keystone Junction a mile west of the town. During the rebuilding, the BHCR ran its trains out of Custer, 15 miles south of Hill City on BN's Deadwood branch. In 1977 the Black Hills Central returned to the Keystone branch, and in 1981 acquired the trackage from BN, which withdrew freight services after its freight traffic had withered away. The last mile was continued into Keystone in 2001.

In 1986, the Burlington Northern abandoned the Deadwood branch through Hill City, leaving the BHCR as an isolated railroad. (The entire former Deadwood line is now the George S. Mickelson Trail, a long distance rail trail.)

Trains operate between early May and early October over the scenic 20-mile (32 km) line.

In May 2026, it was announced that the railroad was sold to World Choice Investments (associated with Dolly Parton's Dollywood and ZMC) as the Warder family retired after 36 years of ownership.

== Equipment ==
=== Locomotives ===
Locomotive details
Number	Images	Type	Model	Built	Builder	Former owner	Status
7		Steam	2-6-2	1919	Baldwin Locomotive Works	Prescott and Northwestern Railroad	Display
103		Steam	2-6-2ST	1922	Baldwin Locomotive Works	Silver Falls Timber Company	Stored, awaiting restoration
104		Steam	2-6-2ST	1926	Baldwin Locomotive Works	Silver Falls Timber Company	Out of service
108		Steam	2-6-6-2ST	1926	Baldwin Locomotive Works	Potlatch Lumber Company; Northwest Railway Museum	Operational
110		Steam	2-6-6-2ST	1928	Baldwin Locomotive Works	Weyerhauser Timber Company; Rayonier Lumber Company	Operational
63		Diesel	GP9	1956	General Motors Electro-Motive Division	Chesapeake and Ohio Railway; Indiana & Ohio Railroad; Northwest Kansas & Missouri Railroad; Chillicothe-Brunswick; Progressive Rail, Inc.	Operational
1		Diesel	80DE6	1940	Geo D. Whitcomb Company	U.S. Army	Operational

=== Former units ===
Locomotive details
Number	Images	Type	Model	Built	Builder	Owner
69		Steam	2-8-0	1908	Baldwin Locomotive Works	White Pass and Yukon Route
9		Steam	2-6-0	1884	Cooke Locomotive and Machine Works	History Colorado

=== Rolling stock ===
Several coaches are wood-bodied, arch-windowed former electric interurban cars built by the American Car Company in 1912-13 for the Oregon Electric Railway, (OE). These were acquired by the Pacific Great Eastern Railway in British Columbia where they were used into the 1960's, before coming to the BHCR in the 1970's.

The High Line Eatery is a static pair of 1940's Pullman-built ex-US Army hospital cars, repurposed as a restaurant.

Rolling stock details
Number	Image	Name	History and Description
65		Edward Gillette	OE Combine car converted to coach
91		Rochford	Coach, converted from an insulated ice & water car for track crews
112			OE coach
113		Keystone	OE coach
140		Mystic	OE coach rebuilt as an open-air observation car
144		Redfern	OE coach rebuilt as an open-air observation car
-		Harney Canyon	CB&Q caboose, rebuilt frame-up to resemble OE coaches
-		Blue Bird	CB&Q flat car, rebuilt frame-up to resemble OE coaches
10800			C&NW Drovers waycar (a bunk car for stockmen accompanying cattle)

=== Former rolling stock ===
Rolling stock details
Number / Name	Image	Type	Built	Builder	Owner
133 (Addie Camp)		Coach	1913	American Car Company	Brew 602
