= Associated Builders and Contractors =

U.S. trade association

- Founded: 1950
- Type: Trade Association
- Purpose: Construction Industry
- Location: Washington, DC
- Region served: United States
- Members: 23,000
- Website: www.abc.org

Associated Builders and Contractors (ABC) is a national U.S. trade association representing the construction industry. ABC is an association of 69 chapters with more than 23,000 general contractors and construction-related firms among its members.

== Overview ==
The association was founded in Baltimore, Maryland, in 1950 to advocate "for free enterprise and open competition in the U.S. construction industry."

ABC engages in legislative and regulatory advocacy at the federal and state levels, focusing primarily on labor and employment law. ABC has engaged in extensive litigation against the U.S. Department of Labor and other federal agencies during the administration of U.S. President Joe Biden. Their positions regarding the Davis-Bacon Act and Project Labor Agreements are generally opposed by labor unions from the building trades.

== Involvement ==
The Center for Responsive Politics has designated ABC as a "Heavy Hitter", rating it among the largest overall contributors to federal elections over the past two decades. The group also ranks among the 50 largest trade associations in the nation according to Washington Business Journal.

== See also ==
- Clinton Bridge Company
- Balfour Beatty Construction
- Construction Data Company
