= ISqFt =

iSqFt, Inc.
- Formerly: Construction Software Technologies
- Company type: Private
- Industry: Commercial construction
- Founded: 1993 in Cincinnati, United States
- Headquarters: Cincinnati, United States
- Area served: Canada; United States
- Key people: Dave Conway (CEO)
- Services: Software as a Service
- Divisions: Building Product Manufacturers; General Contractors; Subcontractors
- Website: www.isqft.com

iSqFt is a Software as a service (SaaS) company that serves general contractors, subcontractors, manufacturers, and suppliers in the North American commercial construction industry.

The company, founded as Construction Software Technologies in 1993, is headquartered in Greater Cincinnati. Dave Conway is the president and CEO.

== Products ==
iSqFt’s software products are used primarily during the design, pre-construction, and procurement stages of construction, and are designed to help users identify project leads and product sales opportunities, network with other construction professionals, manage the bid solicitation process, and view and share digital drawings and specifications.

== Mergers and acquisitions ==
From 2004 through 2009, iSqFt acquired a number of smaller or regional competitors, including:

- BuildPoint (Redwood Shores, Calif.), a provider of online bid management services for general contractors
- US Projects (Omaha, Neb.), a regional provider of online planning-phase project leads
- BidFax (Memphis, Tenn.), a bid management client software application
- BidNews Construction Reports (Tulsa, Okla.), a regional provider of bidding-phase project information
- Plan Express (Memphis, Tenn.), a web-based document-sharing network

In 2006, iSqFt merged with Denver-based competitor Northstar Exchange Corp. (also known as Construction Information Network or Construction News Service).

In 2016, iSqFt became a part of ConstructConnect as a result of a merger with BidClerk, Construction Data and Construction Market Data.

== Awards and recognition ==
In 2004, iSqFt was named one of Inc. magazine's 500 fastest-growing private companies in the country, ranking 50th on the list and first overall in the construction industry. The company appeared on the list again in 2005, after posting a three-year growth of 763%.

In 2009 and 2011, iSqFt was included on the Cincinnati Business Courier’s list of the fastest-growing companies in Greater Cincinnati.

In July 2015, iSqFt was named to the Constructech 50, a list of “the most influential construction technology providers with a strong and ongoing market presence.” Previously, iSqFt’s software application for subcontractors won a 2011 Constructech Magazine Top Products award.
