= Stuhr Museum =

Museum in Grand Island, Nebraska, U.S.

Stuhr Museum of the Prairie Pioneer
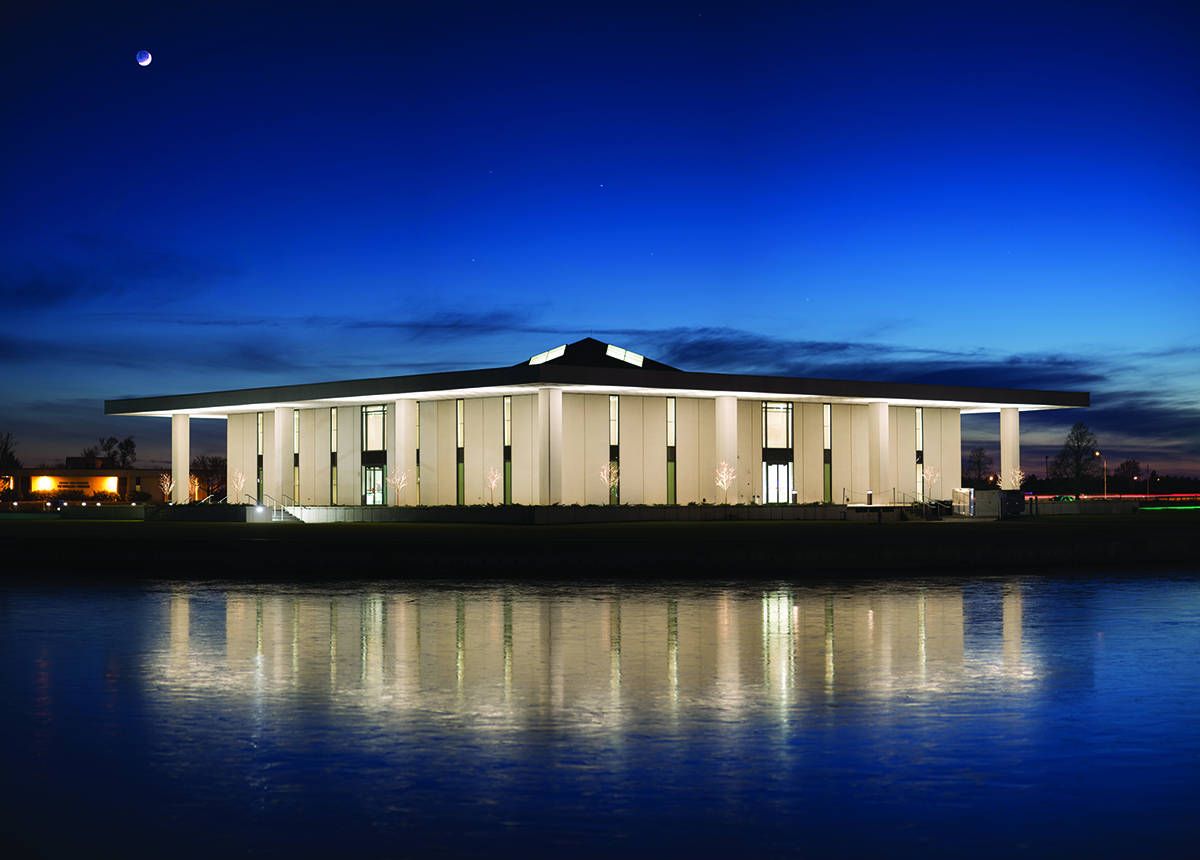
- The Stuhr Museum in 2016
- Interactive map of the Stuhr Museum of the Prairie Pioneer area

General information
- Location: 3133 US 34, Grand Island, Nebraska, U.S.
- Coordinates: 40.8839°N 98.3733°W

Website
- www.stuhrmuseum.org
- Stuhr Museum
- U.S. National Register of Historic Places
- Built: 1965–1967
- Architect: Edward Durell Stone
- Architectural style: New Formalism
- NRHP reference No.: 15000396
- Added to NRHP: June 29, 2015

The Stuhr Museum of the Prairie Pioneer is a museum located in Grand Island, Nebraska intended to preserve the legacy of the Pioneers who settled the plains of Central Nebraska in the late 19th century. It features a living history village called Railroad Town, designed to evoke an 1890s-era prairie village and made up of many original period structures moved to the museum. The museum was originally announced in November 1960 and officially opened in 1967.

Renovations to the museum began in 2014 and were completed in 2015. It was listed on the National Register of Historic Places on June 29, 2015.The museum is named after Leo Stuhr, a local farmer and politician whose family were among the area's pioneer settlers. He donated land, money, and numerous artifacts that served as the foundation of the museum. The building that houses the bulk of the museum's exhibits, the Stuhr Building, was designed by architect Edward Durell Stone and was built by Geer-Melkus Construction Co., Inc.

== History ==
The Sturh Museum of the Prairie Pioneer was announced as the Hall County Museum in late 1960. The museum was made possible by a $25,000 donation from Leo Stuhr, whom the museum would later be named after. Fundraising began in early 1961 and was completed by March. In January 1963, architectural plans were completed, which included a two-story, 117 square foot (10.9 m^{2}) building on a 186 square foot (17.3 m^{2}) podium. It would cost an estimated $500,000 and would take up 165 acres.

During planning in 1963, the name of the museum was officially changed to Stuhr Museum after Stuhr died in 1961. Additionally, plans were downsized in order to cut costs. In 1965, the Stolley House, built in 1891, was moved to the museum site. Later in 1965, the museum board abandoned plans to build in East Grand Island, moving the site to Southwest Grand Island. Construction began in 1965 and was originally intended to be complete in June 1967. However, the opening was delayed due to flooding. The Stuhr Museum was officially dedicated in July 1967.

In 2014, renovations were announced for the Stuhr Museum. Renovations cost $7.4 million and were completed in 2015. Later that year, the museum was listed on the National Register of Historic Places. In 2019, the museum received funding to renovate the Robert Taylor House. The house had been in possession of the museum since 2000, and had been in disrepair since. Renovations were completed by May 2025.

== Design ==
The museum features a living history village called Railroad Town, designed to evoke an 1890s-era prairie village and made up of many original period structures moved to the museum. It was designed by Edward Durell Stone and built in the New Formalism style by Geer-Melkus Construction Co., Inc. Among the structures in Railroad Town is the house where actor Henry Fonda was born in 1905. Movies filmed at the museum include Sarah, Plain and Tall (1991) and My Antonia (1995). The museum once had a working steam locomotive, White Pass and Yukon Route 69, that traveled the 3 ft (914 mm) narrow gauge Nebraska Midland Railroad on the museum grounds. It was traded to the White Pass and Yukon Route in 2001 for a pair of three passenger trucks.

== Gallery ==
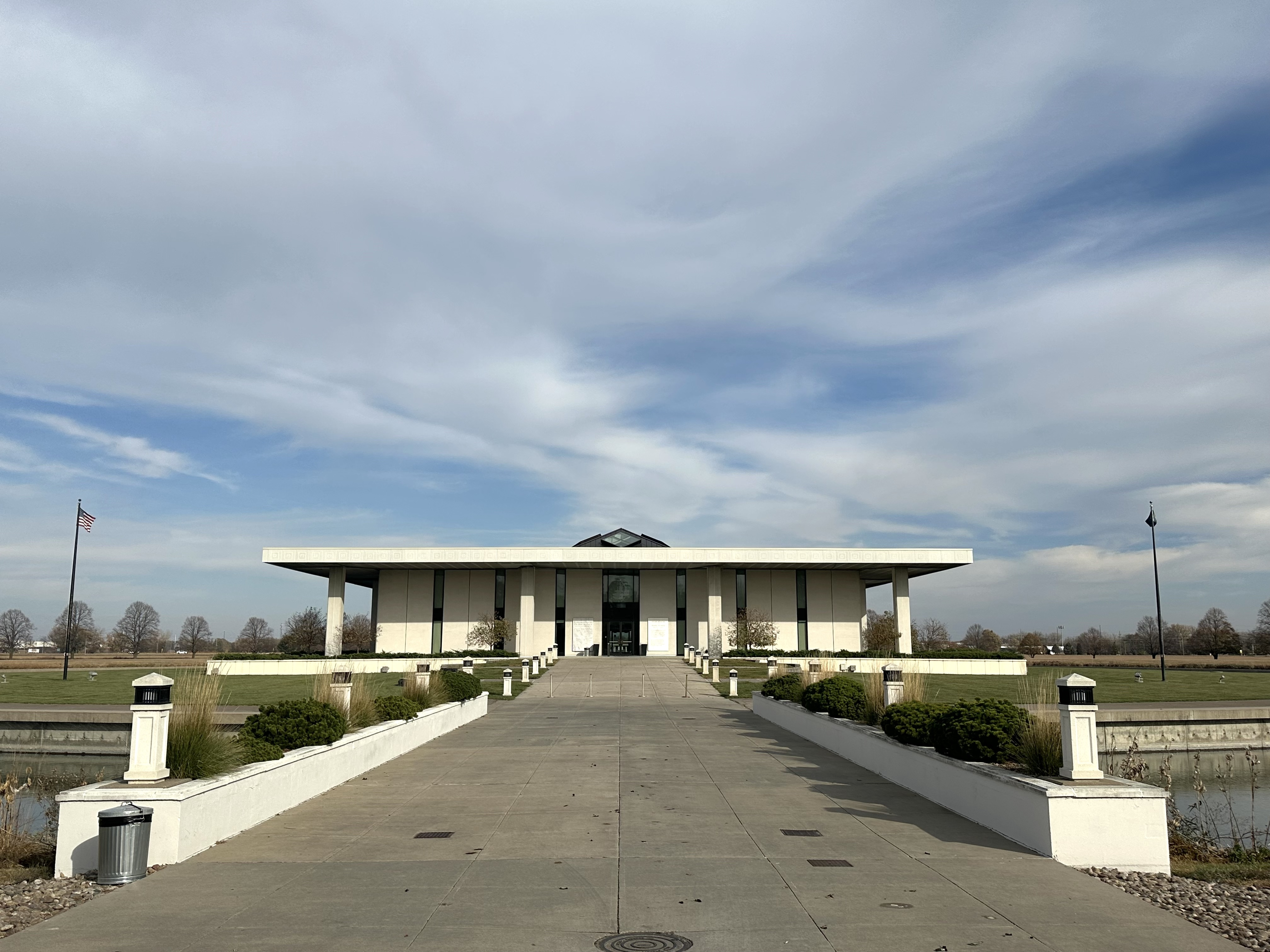
Pedestrian entrance

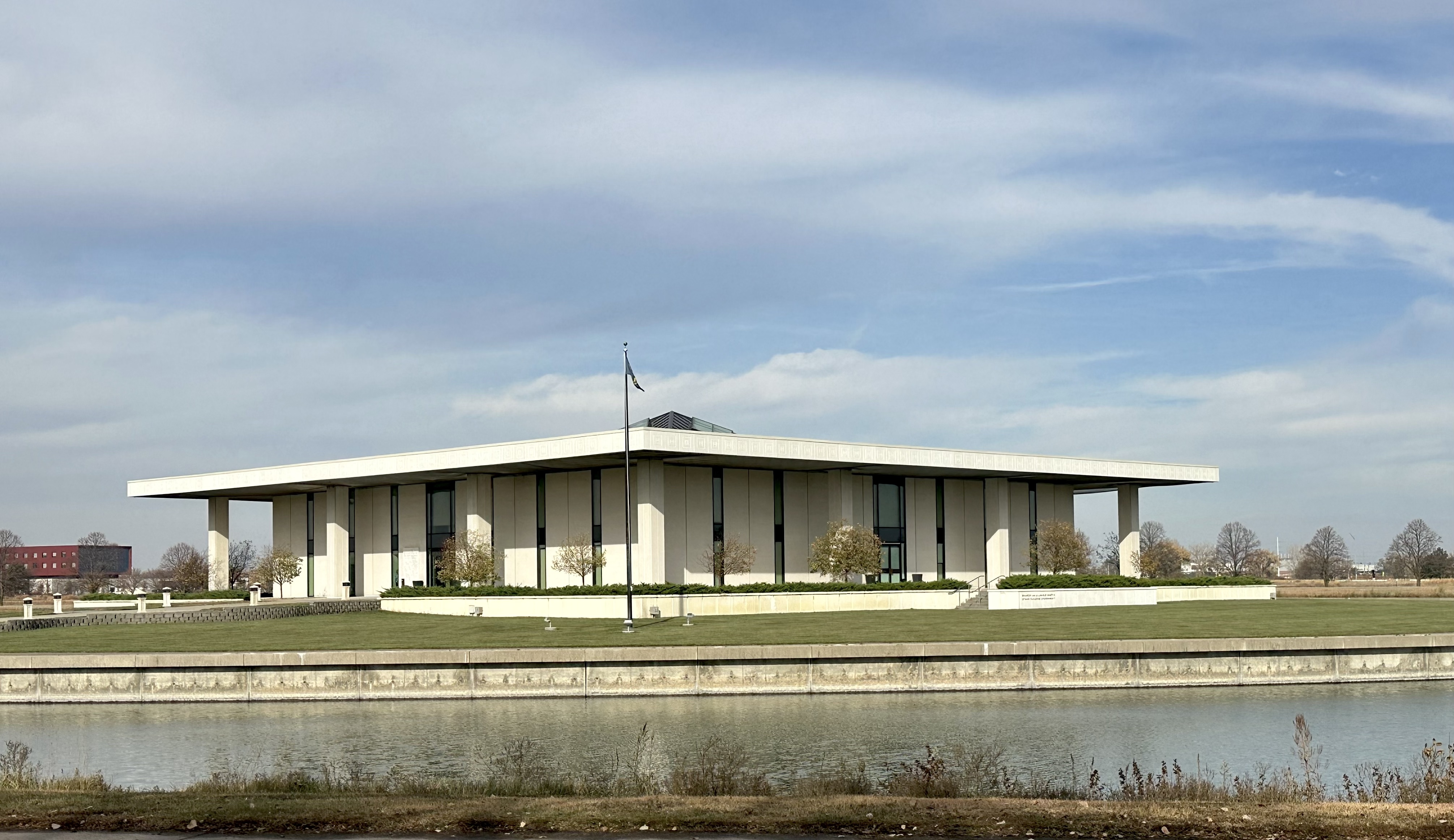

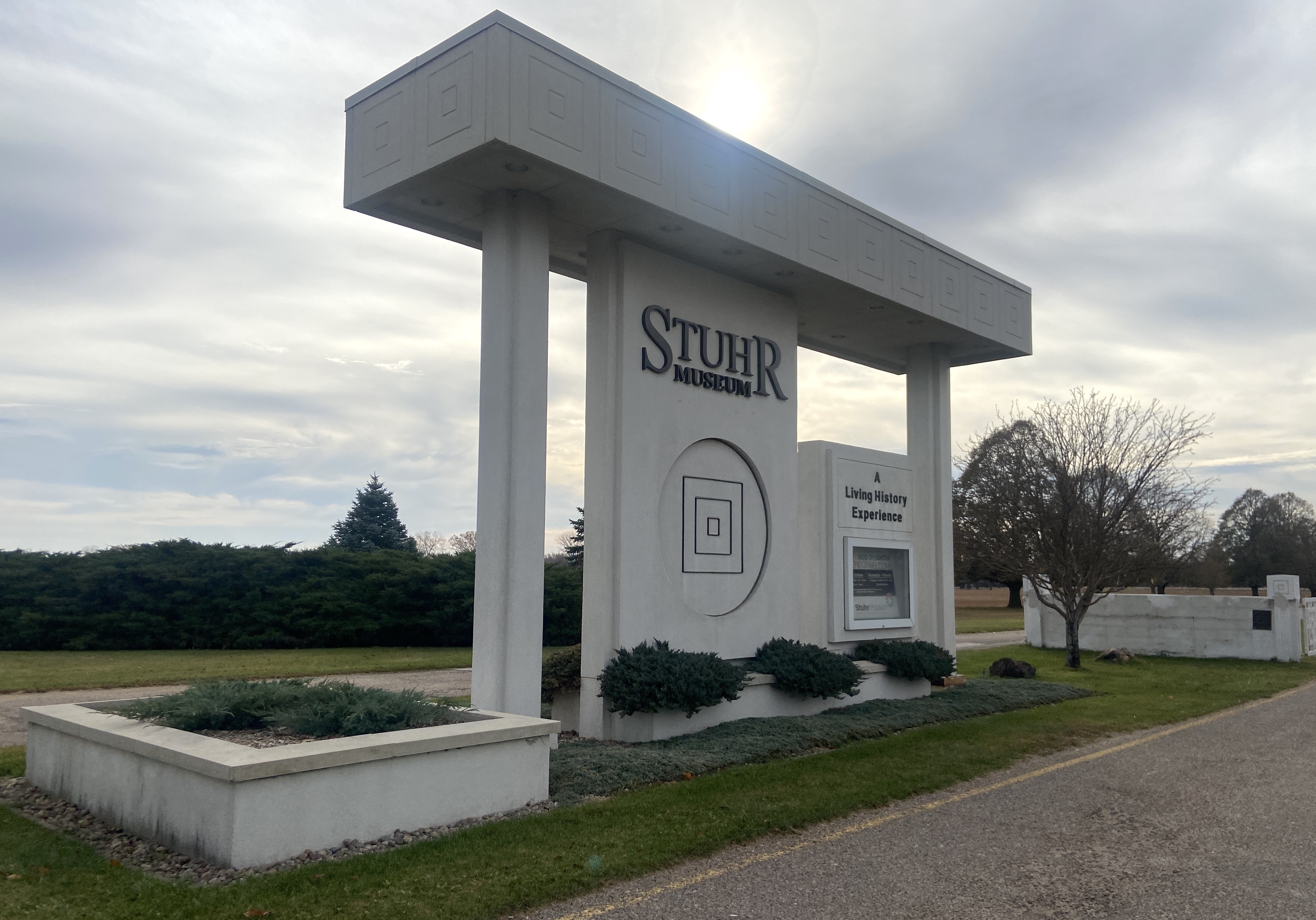
Entrance signage

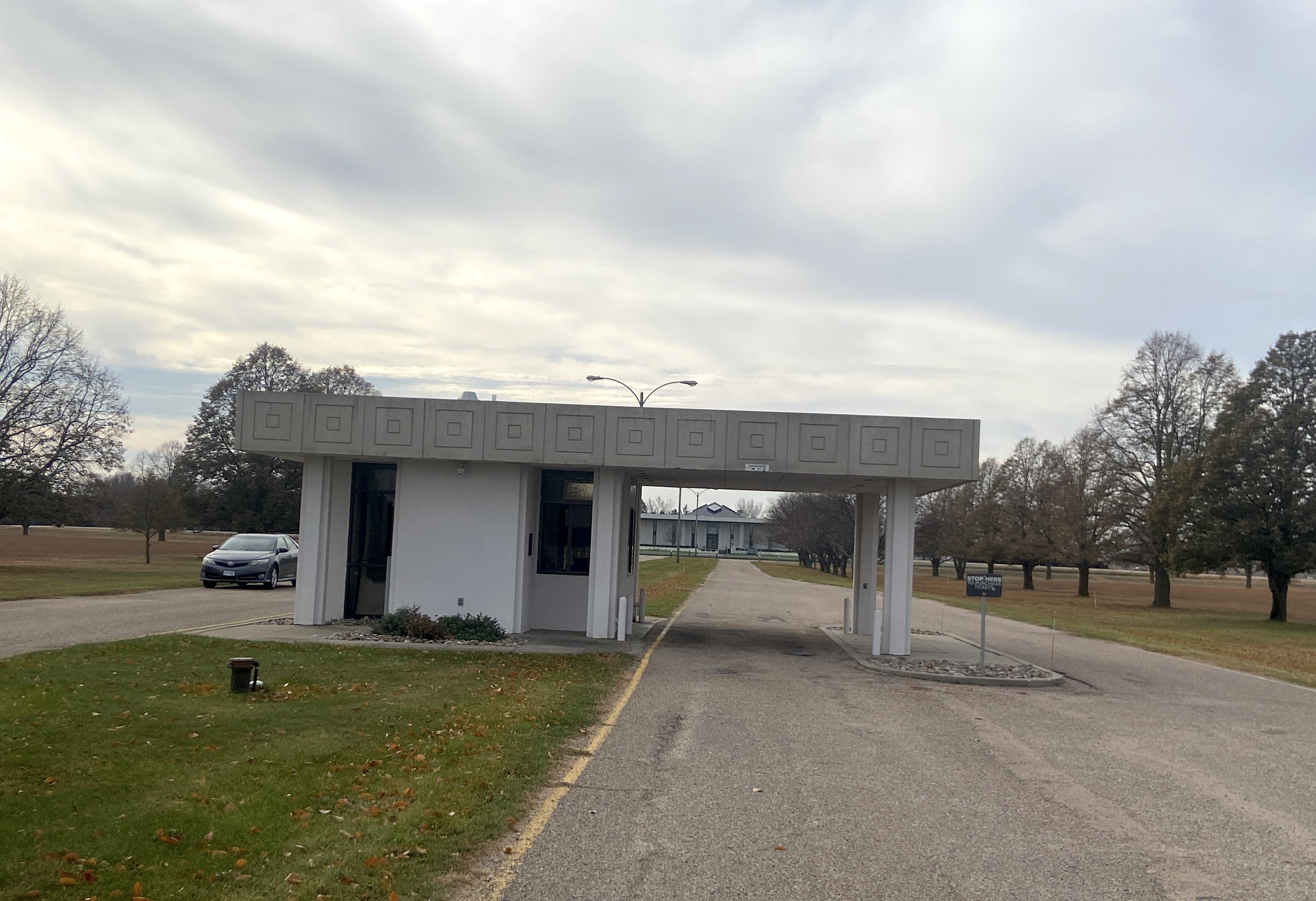
Gate house

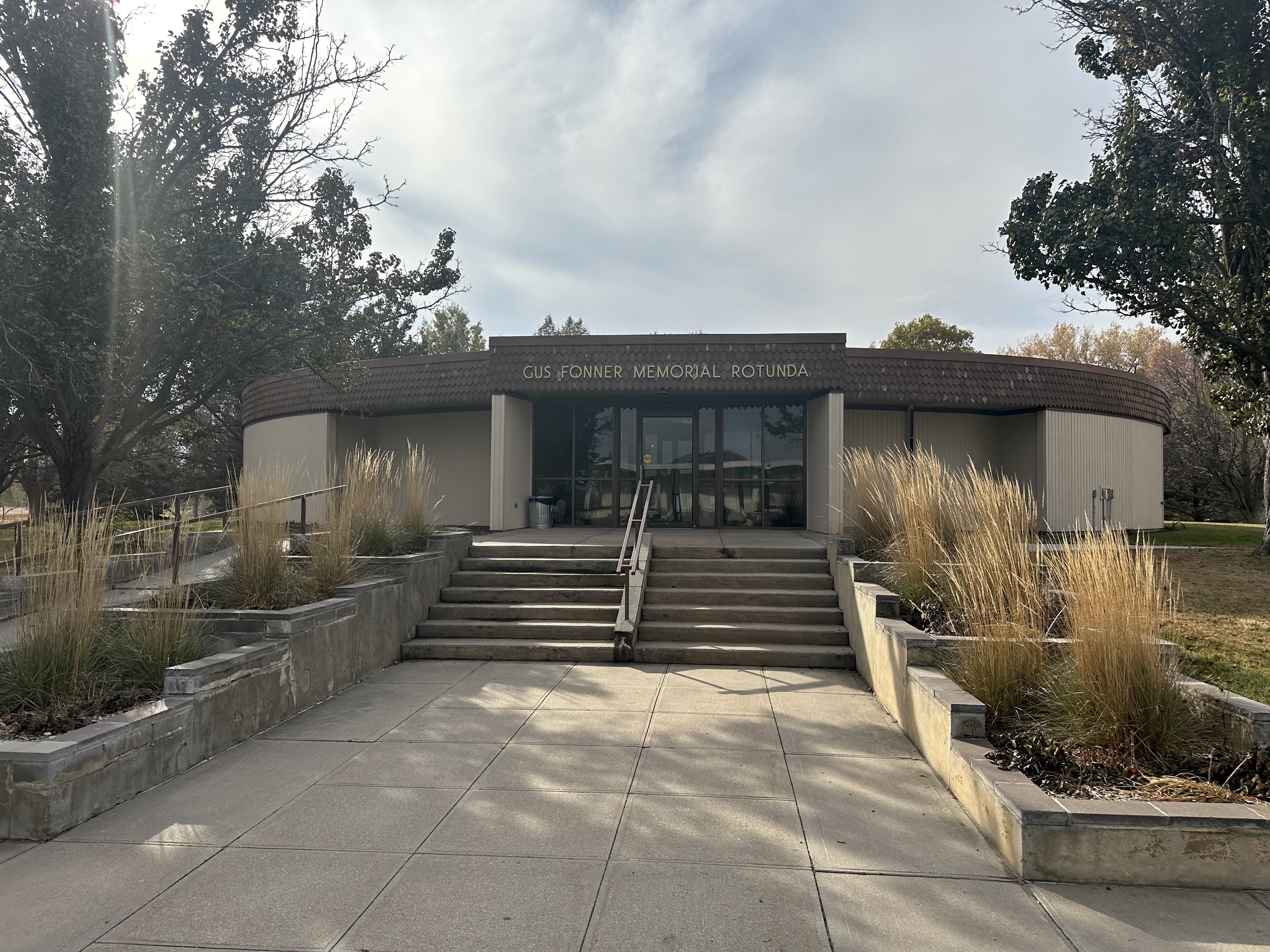
Gus Fonner Memorial Rotunda

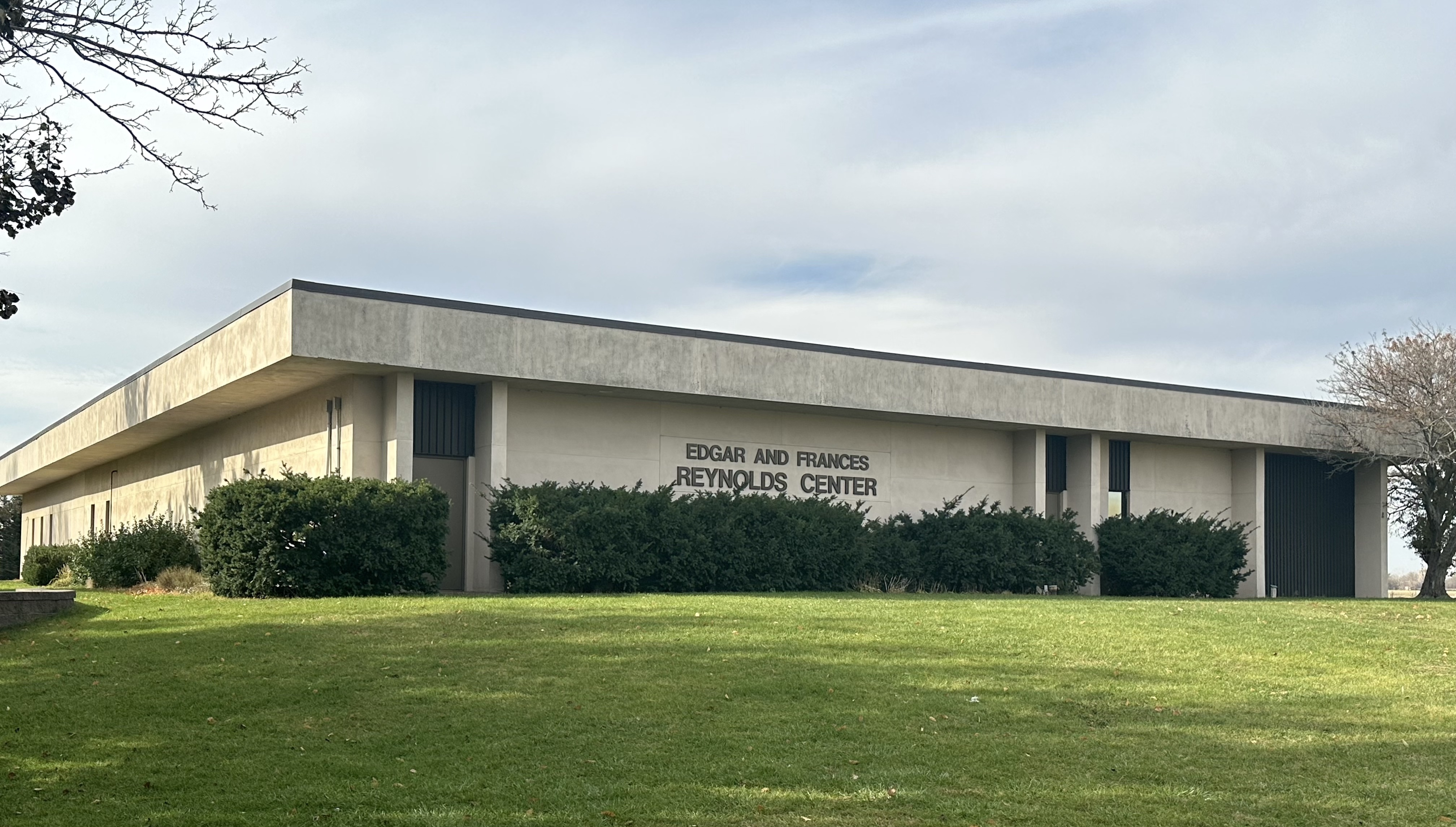
Reynolds Center

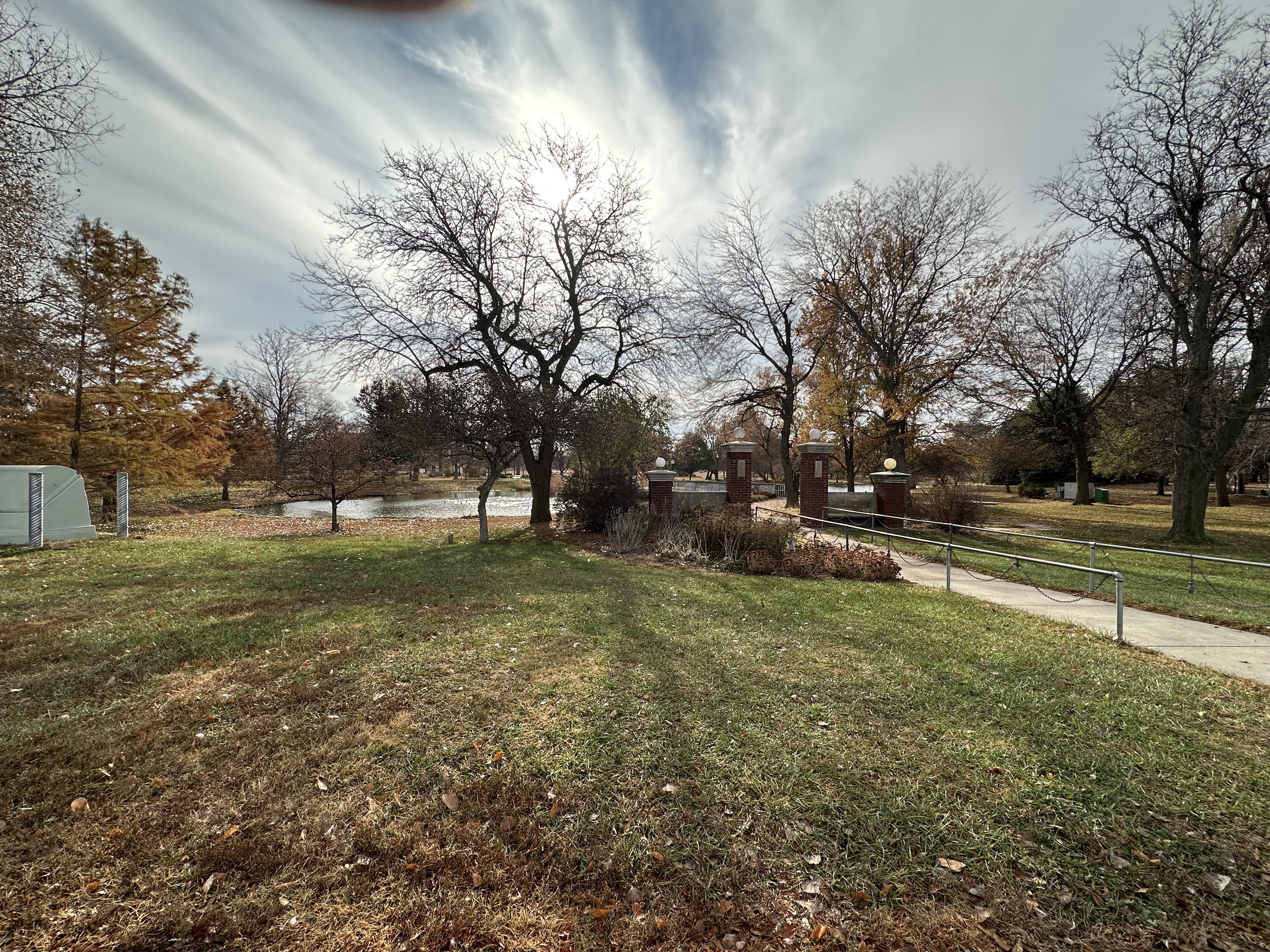
Grounds

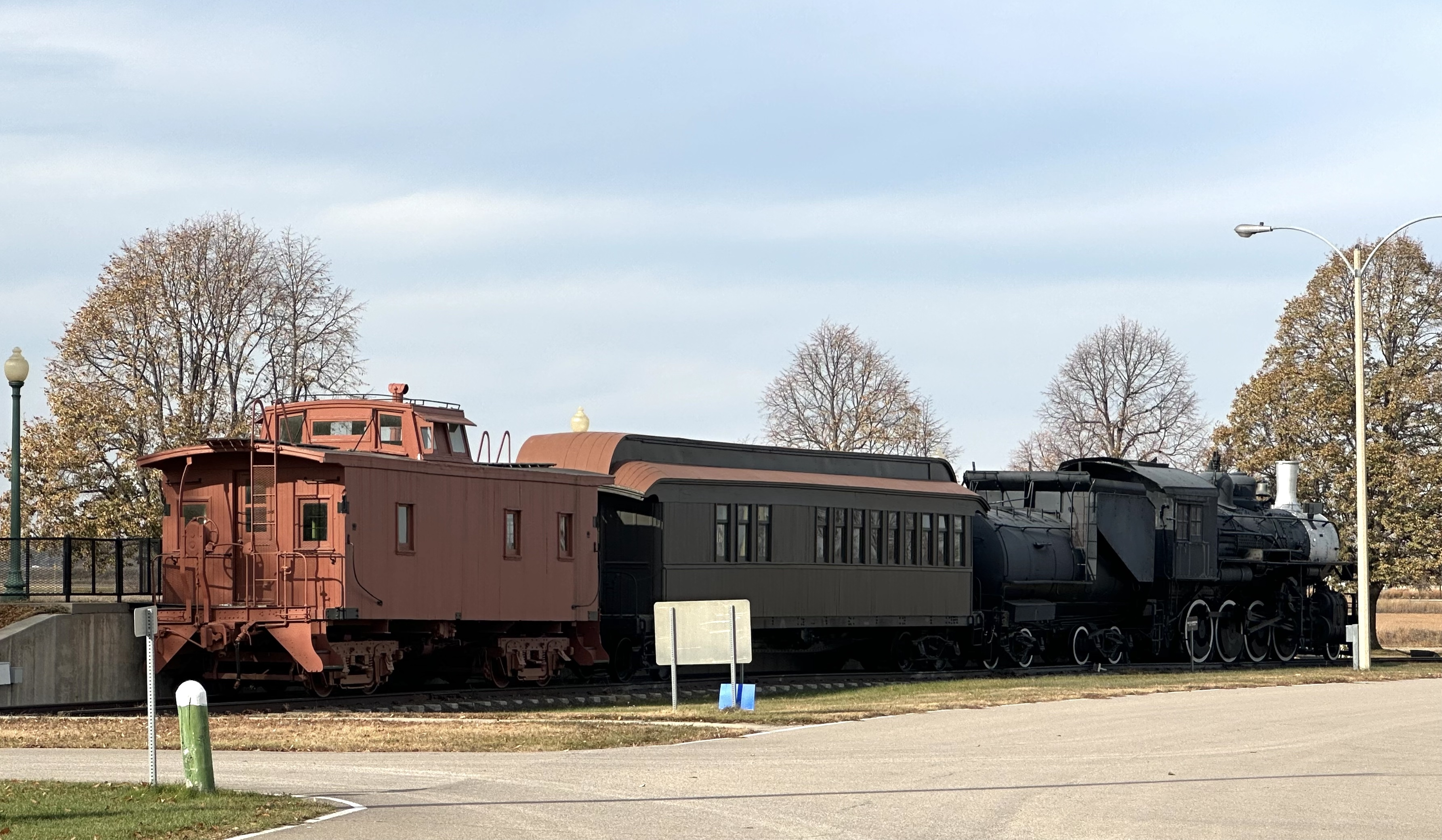
Train
