= CMD Group =

North American construction industry publishing company

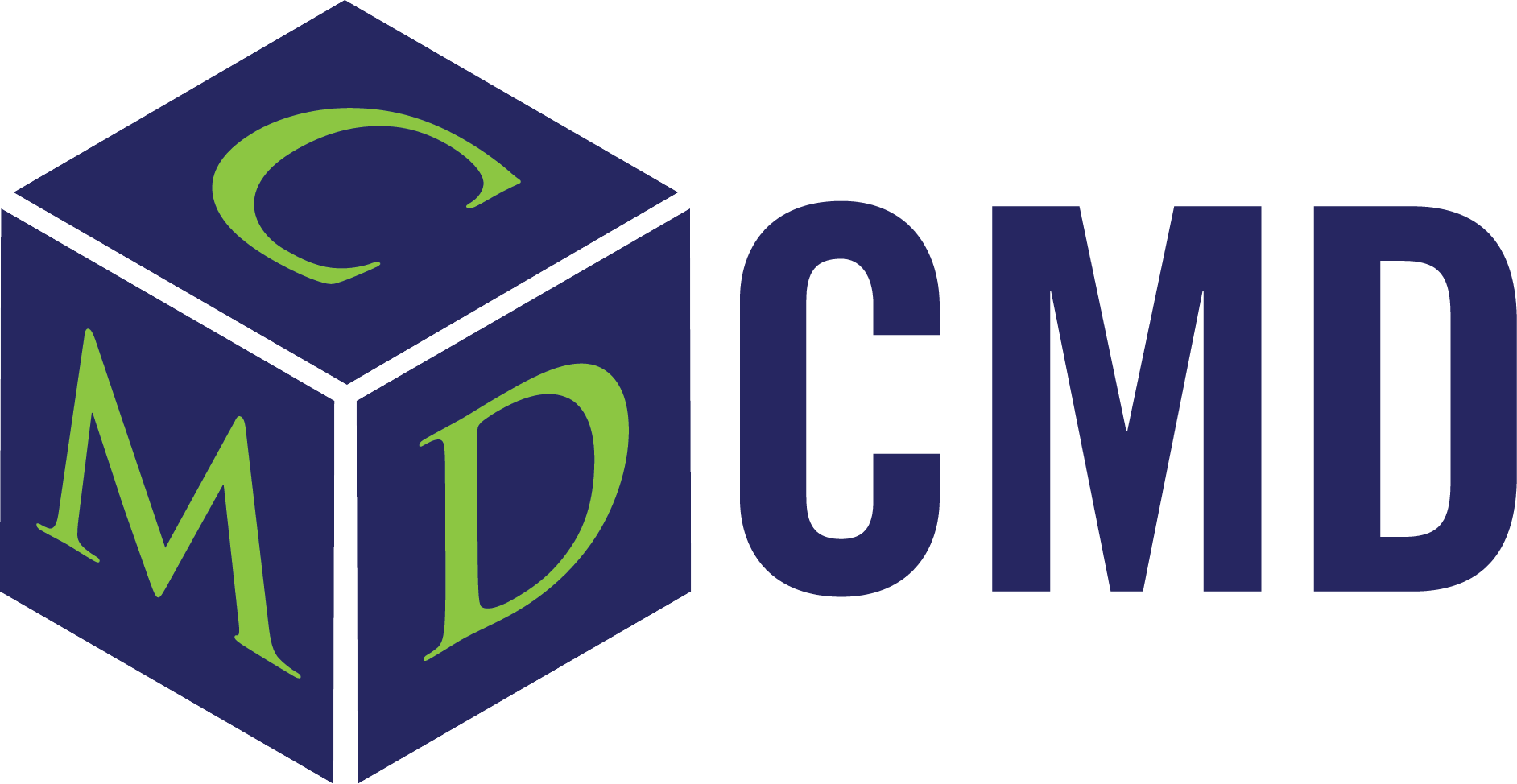
- Formerly: Construction Market Data, Reed Construction Data
- Type: Publishing company
- Industry: Construction
- Founded: 1982
- Headquarters: 3825 Edwards Road, Ste. 800, Cincinnati, Ohio, United States
- Services: construction market data, construction leads
- Owners: ConstructConnect
- Website: cmdgroup.com

CMD Group, formerly Reed Construction Data and Construction Market Data, is a provider of business information for the North American construction industry. CMD is owned by ConstructConnect. Its historical roots lie in Construction Market Data, founded in 1982 to publish construction leads and market data. In 2000, London-based Reed Elsevier purchased this original CMD Group, transitioning the company to Reed Construction Data.

In October 2014 private equity firm Warburg Pincus in New York purchased a majority stake in the company, and Reed Construction Data changed its name to CMD. CMD said the new name is a nod to the company's original name: Construction Market Data. The new brand includes an updated logo and website.

The company tracks data on hundreds of thousands of projects per year, providing coverage of construction projects in both the United States and Canada. The company provides monthly analysis and data for all aspects of the construction industry. CMD also provides a detailed view of construction activity, including historical data, current-year projections and a five-year forecast. Their research helps customers forecast to find those market segments experiencing the greatest growth and plan tactical marketing strategies.

== Lawsuits ==
In October 2009, Reed Construction Data filed suit in federal court against McGraw-Hill Construction, charging that the company's Dodge Report had unlawfully accessed confidential and trade secret information from Reed since 2002 by using a series of fake companies to pose as Reed customers. The lawsuit, filed in the U.S. District Court for the Southern District of New York, sought an unspecified amount in lost profits and punitive damages, trial by jury, and injunctive relief as a result of Dodge's misuse of proprietary construction project information, and that Dodge allegedly manipulated the information to create misleading comparisons between Dodge's and Reed's products and services in an effort to mislead the marketplace.

== Merger ==
In 2016, CMD Group became a part of ConstructConnect as part of a merger with iSqFt, BidClerk, Construction Data.
