= White Pass and Yukon Route 69 =

Preserved narrow gauge 2-8-0 locomotive

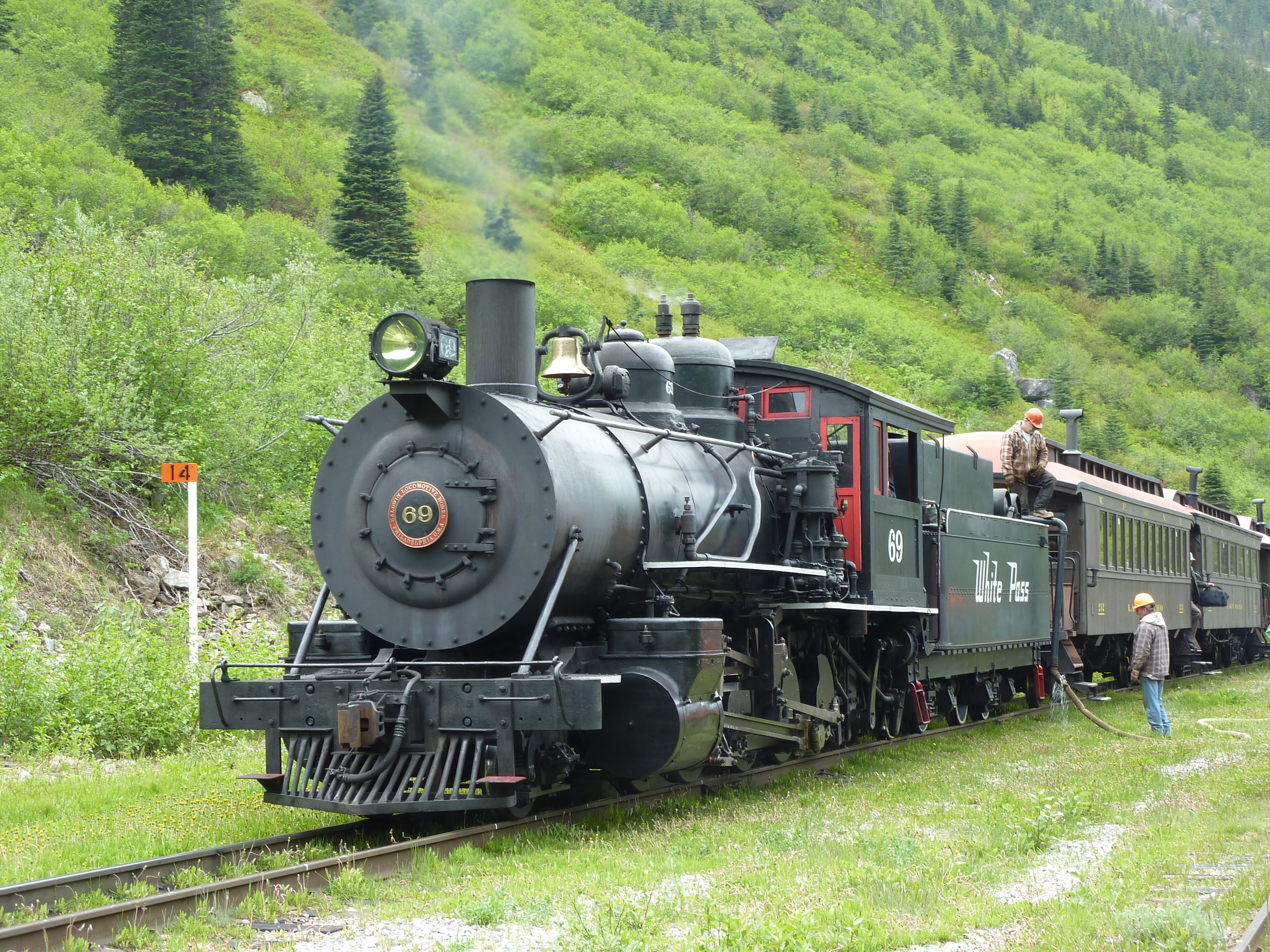
- No. 69 being filled with water, June 11, 2011
Type and origin
- Power type: Steam
- Builder: Baldwin Locomotive Works
- Serial number: 32962
- Model: 10-36E
- Build date: June 1908
- Rebuild date: August 1932
Specifications
- Configuration
  - Whyte: 2-8-0
- Gauge: 3 ft (914 mm)
- Driver dia.: 42 in (1.1 m)
- Wheelbase: 42 ft 8 1/2 in (13.02 m)
- Height: 13 ft 14 in (4.32 m)
- Adhesive weight: 124,000 lb (56.2 t)
- Loco weight: 134,369 lb (60.9 t)
- Total weight: 134,000 lb (60.8 t)
- Fuel type: New: Coal; Now: Oil
- Fuel capacity: Coal: 7.5 t (7.4 long tons; 8.3 short tons); Oil: 2,500 US gal (9,500 L; 2,100 imp gal)
- Water cap.: 4,000 US gal (15,000 L; 3,300 imp gal)
- Firebox
  - Grate area: 36 sq ft (3.3 m^{2})
- Boiler: 66 in (1.7 m) diameter
- Boiler pressure: 160 psi (1.1 MPa)
- Heating surface
  - Firebox: 100 sq ft (9.3 m^{2})
  - Tubes: 182 sq ft (16.9 m^{2})
  - Flues: 16.67 sq ft (1.549 m^{2})
  - Total surface: 1,676 sq ft (155.7 m^{2})
- Cylinders: Two, outside
- Cylinder size: 21 in × 22 in (533 mm × 559 mm)
- Valve gear: Walschaerts
- Valve type: Piston valves
- Loco brake: Air
- Train brakes: Air
- Couplers: Knuckle
Performance figures
- Tractive effort: 31,400 lbf (139.7 kN)
Career
- Operators: White Pass and Yukon Route; United States Army Transportation Corps; Black Hills Central Railroad; Nebraska Midland Railroad; Stuhr Museum
- Class: 10-36E
- Number in class: 1st of 1
- Numbers: WPY 69; USATC 69; BHCR 69; NMR 69
- Nicknames: Bull of The Woods; Gila Monster; Klondike Casey
- Retired: 1954 (revenue service); 1990 (1st excursion service)
- Restored: August 18, 1957 (1st excursion service); September 2006 (2nd excursion service)
- Current owner: White Pass and Yukon Route
- Disposition: Undergoing 1,472-day inspection and overhaul

White Pass and Yukon Route 69 is a narrow-gauge 2-8-0 "Consolidation" type steam locomotive, built in 1908 by the Baldwin Locomotive Works (BLW). It is preserved and operated by the White Pass and Yukon Route (WPY).

== History ==
No. 69 was built in June 1908 by the Baldwin Locomotive Works (BLW) for the White Pass and Yukon Route (WPY), where it worked hauling both freight and passenger trains for thirty years, it was originally given the nickname Bull of The Woods by late engineer J.D. True. (Note: Attributed to multiple sources:) The locomotive was later assigned to the United States Army Transportation Corps (USATC) to help assist its sister WPY locomotives of transporting materials, troops and other equipment to build the ALCAN highway during World War II, there, it was given the nickname Gila Monster.

On February 12, 1932, the Skagway roundhouse suffered a major fire, No. 69 along with three other steam locomotives were inside the roundhouse and were badly damaged. However, the damage to No. 69 was minor and the railroad was able to rebuild No. 69 and return it to service in August of that same year. It was originally built as a coal burner, but was later converted to burn oil in 1951.

The locomotive was reassigned to the WPY were it continued hauling freight and passengers until it was retired from revenue service in 1954. It was later sold to the Black Hills Central Railroad (BHCR) in 1956 for use of their tourist excursions, It hauled the railroad's very first excursion train on August 18, 1957 and was given the nickname Klondike Casey. (Note: Attributed to multiple sources:)

In 1973, it was sold to the Nebraska Midland Railroad (NMR) in North Platte, Nebraska, were it only operated there for a year when operations was later relocated to the Stuhr Museum in Grand Island, Nebraska. (Note: Attributed to multiple sources:) No. 69 continued in service until 1990, when it was retired once again and put on static display.

In June 2001, Stuhr traded No. 69 to WPY for a pair of three passenger trucks. Three years later, the WPY officially began restoration work on No. 69 to return it to operating condition to help assist No. 73 with passenger excursions. It underwent a successful test fired in 2005 and eventually returned to service the following year in September 2006. (Note: Attributed to multiple sources:)

In September 2009, No. 69 ran a rare doubleheader excursion special with No. 73, running from Skagway to Fraser, British Columbia and return.

== Bibliography ==
- Gray, Carl R. (1955). Railroading in Eighteen Countries: The Story of American Railroad Men Serving in the Military Railway Service from 1862 to 1953. Charles Scribner's Sons. p. 46.
- Clifford, Howard (1981). Rails North: The Railroads of Alaska and the Yukon. Superior Publishing Company. p. 46. ISBN 978-0875645360.
- Reisdorff, James J. (1984). Locomotive 69 From Alaska to Nebraska. South Platte Press. ISBN 0-9609568-2-4.
- J. D. True (1994). It Happened on the White Pass: The Life and Times of a Narrow-Gauge Railway Engineer. Northbush Publications. ISBN 1-896079-02-4.
- Wilson, Graham (1998). The White Pass and Yukon Route Railway. Wolf Creek Books. ISBN 978-0-96-819552-9.
