= Nebraska Midland Railroad =

American narrow gauge steam line

Overview
- Headquarters: North Platte, Nebraska; Grand Island, Nebraska
- Reporting mark: NMR
- Locale: North Platte, Nebraska; Grand Island, Nebraska
- Dates of operation: 1973–1990

Technical
- Track gauge: 3 ft (914 mm)
- Length: 10 mi (16 km)

The Nebraska Midland Railroad (reporting mark NMR) was a narrow-gauge shortline railroad that was established in 1973 in North Platte, Nebraska. It operated only one year of passenger service there before having to look for a new base due to not being able to obtain the needed right of way. It then relocated to Stuhr Museum in Grand Island, Nebraska and operated at least through the 1980s. It used a 3 ft (914 mm) narrow gauge 2-8-0 Baldwin steam engine that had originally run on the White Pass and Yukon Route. In 2001, No. 69 was sold back to WPY and was restored to operating condition again in 2006.
