= Construction Data Company =

CDC News
- Type: Publishing company
- Industry: Construction
- Headquarters: Vero Beach, Florida
- Owner: Alta, LLC

Construction Data Company, is a publisher of business information which caters to the commercial construction industry. They are also known as CDC News and CDC Publishing, and are the third largest provider of commercial SaaS construction reports in the United States, next to Dodge Report and Reed Construction Data. They supply construction data and project information for the commercial construction industry through numerous regional reports in 30 states.

Information products are targeted to general contractors, sub-contractors, suppliers and manufacturers reps and are available in print or online. CDC is headquartered in Vero Beach, Florida and owned by an investment group, ALTA, LLC. CDC's Lead Manager software has consistently achieved the highest ratings of customer satisfaction and product innovation in the industry. They have a partnership with eTakeoff.com which allows general contractors and sub-contractors whom subscribe to the service to download blueprints (or "plans") and spec books directly to a plotter through computer-aided design. Contractors also have access to a given project's architectural reprography.

CDC operates three companies under its umbrella, each focusing on a different geographic location. BidTool.net covers the construction activity in Illinois, Indiana, Wisconsin, and Colorado, while CDC covers most of the rest of the country, with the exception of the southeastern US, which is covered by its DataFax arm.

The company, founded in the late 1970s, offers both online reports in all markets and a paper report is maintained in a few select markets, such as New England. The company generates approximately $10M in annual revenue. CDC's president is L. William Black.

== Merger ==
In 2016 Construction Data became a part of ConstructConnect which was the result of a merger with iSqFt, BidClerk, and Construction Market Data.
