= Corbin (surname) =

Corbin is a surname. Notable people with the surname include:

== Arts and entertainment ==
- Alice Corbin Henderson (1881–1949), née Corbin, American poet, author and poetry editor
- Barry Corbin (born 1940), American character actor
- Easton Corbin (born 1982), American singer
- John Corbin (1870–1959), American dramatic critic and author
- Jake Corbin (1964–1992), American adult film actor, dancer, and AIDS activist
- Patrick Corbin (dancer), American dancer and founder of Corbin Dances
- Rita Corbin (1930–2011), American Catholic Worker and artist
- Virginia Lee Corbin (1910–1942), American silent film actress

== Military ==
- Henry Clark Corbin (1842–1909), United States Army lieutenant general and Adjutant General
- Joseph Louis Corbin (1797–1859), French general
- Margaret Corbin (1751–1800), woman who fought in the American Revolutionary War
- Thomas G. Corbin (1820–1901), United States Navy officer

== Politics and law ==
- Arthur Linton Corbin, (1874–1967), American law professor and scholar of contract law
- Bob Corbin (1922–2013), American politician
- Caroline Corbin (1835–1918), American writer, social reformer and anti-suffragist
- Charles Corbin, French diplomat
- Donald L. Corbin (1938–2016), American judge
- Eugène Corbin (1800–1874), French procureur-général (government attorney) and politician
- Eymard Corbin (born 1934), Canadian senator
- Kilmer B. Corbin (1919–1993), American attorney
- Marie-Thérèse Lucidor Corbin (1749–1834), French Creole activist
- Michael Corbin (1955–2008), American diplomat and ambassador to the United Arab Emirates
- Paula Jones (born 1966), née Corbin, former Arkansas state employee who sued President Bill Clinton for sexual harassment
- Robert Corbin (Guyanese politician) (born 1948), Guyanese politician
- Rosemary Corbin, mayor of Richmond, California, and community leader

== Sports ==
- Archie Corbin (born 1967), American former Major League Baseball pitcher
- Harold Corbin (1906–1988), American Olympic fencer
- Linsey Corbin (born 1981), American triathlete
- Pa Corbin (1864–1943), American football player
- Patrick Corbin (born 1989), Major League Baseball pitcher
- Philip Corbin (born 1957), chess FIDE Master from Barbados
- Ray Corbin (born 1949), American former Major League Baseball pitcher
- Roberto Corbin (born 1953), Panamanian football player in Europe
- Serge Corbin, Canadian marathon canoe racer
- Tim Corbin (born 1961), American baseball coach
- Tony Corbin (born 1974), American football player
- Tyrone Corbin (born 1962), American retired American basketball player

== Others ==
- Abel Corbin, (1808–1881), American financier and the husband of Virginia Grant
- Alain Corbin (born 1936), French historian
- Alfred Corbin (1916–1943), French communist spy and Resistance fighter
- Brenda Corbin (born 1942), American astronomy librarian
- Austin Corbin (1827–1896), American railroad executive
- Henry Corbin (1903–1978), French philosopher, theologian, and professor of Islamic Studies
- Jane Corbin (born 1954), British journalist for the BBC
- Laetitia Corbin (1657–1706), American colonist
- Myrtle Corbin (1868–1928), American sideshow performer with two pelvises, each with its own pair of legs

== Fictional characters ==
- Mike Corbin, in the American soap opera General Hospital
- Greg Corbin, in the American animated show American Dad

== See also ==
- Corbyn
