= Aydelotte =

Aydelotte is a surname and given name. Notable people with the name include:

- Frank Aydelotte (1880–1956), American educator and director of the Institute for Advanced Study
- Myrtle Aydelotte (1917–2010), American nurse, professor and hospital administrator
- William O. Aydelotte (1910–1996), American historian
- William Aydelotte (tennis) (1903–1997), American tennis player

== Middle name ==
- Davis Aydelotte Robertson, American baseball player
- Henry Aydelotte Houston, American politician

== Other ==
- Aydelotte, Oklahoma, a place in the US
