= Mary A. R. Marshall =

American politician (1921–1992)

Member of the Virginia House of Delegates from the 48th district
- In office January 12, 1983 – January 8, 1992
- Preceded by: Ted Morrison; Alan Diamonstein; Bobby Scott
- Succeeded by: Judy Connally

Member of the Virginia House of Delegates from the 22nd district
- In office January 12, 1972 – January 12, 1983
- Preceded by: Henry O. Lampe
- Succeeded by: Joseph P. Crouch

Member of the Virginia House of Delegates from Arlington
- In office January 12, 1966 – January __, 1970 Serving with C. Harrison Mann, Wallace G. Dickson, William M. Lightsey
- Preceded by: Kathryn H. Stone
- Succeeded by: George Mason Green, Jr.

Personal details
- Born: June 14, 1923 Cook County, Illinois
- Died: October 9, 1992 (aged 69) Arlington, Virginia, U.S.
- Party: Democratic
- Spouse: Roger Dureya Marshall
- Children: 3
- Education: Swarthmore College

Mary Aydelotte Rice Marshall (June 14, 1921 – October 9, 1992) was an American civic activist, housewife and Democratic politician who represented Arlington, Virginia in the Virginia General Assembly for more than twenty years.

== Early and family life ==
Born on June 14, 1921, in Chicago, Illinois, where her father John Andrew Rice was teaching and studying at the University of Chicago, Marion Aydelotte Rice moved with her family to Nebraska, England and finally North Carolina, where her father helped found Black Mountain College in 1933. Mary Rice attended Swarthmore College in Pennsylvania, where her mother's brother Frank Aydelotte was president, and graduated with highest honors.

She met Roger Dureya Marshall when they were both working for the Alien Property Custodian Office in Washington, D.C. during World War II. They married in 1944 and had three daughters who survived them.

== Career ==
After moving to Washington D.C. in 1942, Marshall worked as an economist for the U.S. Department of Justice until 1946. She and her husband settled in Arlington, Virginia in 1953.

As a housewife, Mrs. Marshall became politically active in the League of Women Voters, then the local Democratic Party (which she found conservative but not in lockstep with the Byrd Organization). Marshall consistently opposed the Byrd Organization's Massive Resistance against the Supreme Court's school desegregation decisions in Brown v. Board of Education, and later commented that she was initially one of 17 "liberals" out of 70 local Democratic Committee members. Arlington voluntarily desegregated in February 1959 after Governor J. Lindsay Almond broke with the Byrd Organization and acceded to decisions by a three-judge federal panel and the Virginia Supreme Court issued on January 19, 1959. Marshall and a fellow desegregation advocate entertained frightened parents on the day that Stratford Junior High School quietly desegregated.

Arlington's Democrats elected Marshall as their chairman in 1961 (she won by 2 votes). One of her first acts was to eliminate the Committee's reliance on closed executive sessions, as well as the prior practice of siding with Republicans (led by U.S. Congressman Joel Broyhill) in order to defeat "Arlingtonians for A Better County" (ABC) candidates for County offices. This arose in part because the ABC opposed closing schools to prevent their desegregation (part of Massive Resistance, which Broyhill's opponent and ABC co-founder Edmund D. Campbell had fought) and generally progressive positions. Marshall also created a data base (at first manual lists) of Democratic voters and support throughout the County, made sure that voters who paid the $1 poll tax in May also actually registered to vote in the fall elections, and established "New Frontier" clubs throughout the county which met monthly to discuss various issues of the day and attracted potential voters. To preserve party unity, Marshall ensured that both Arlington's Democratic state senator, Charles R. Fenwick (who cooperated with the Byrd Organization) and delegate Hank Mann (Fenwick's protege who soon broke with the organization because its apportionment shortchanged northern Virginia) remained on the party's steering committee. Delegate Mann (together with consistently pro-desegregation Arlington delegate Kathryn H. Stone and two other northern Virginia legislators) challenged the Byrd organization's reapportionment following the 1960 census. As a result of the U.S. Supreme Court's decision striking down the previous reapportionment in Davis v. Mann, Arlington received another seat in the General Assembly. However, in 1965 Stone decided against seeking re-election.

Marshall defeated Republican Caroline Ogletree and succeeded Stone. She served her first two terms in the Virginia House of Delegates, from 1966 to 1970, alongside veteran Democrat Hank Mann as well as fellow Democrats Wallace G. Dickson and William M. Lightsey in what was then Virginia's 9th District. Mrs. Marshall joined Marion Galland and Dorothy Shoemaker McDiarmid, both also from northern Virginia, in the Virginia General Assembly. House Speaker Blackie Moore, a lieutenant in the Byrd Organization, assigned all four female delegates to the Education Committee.

However, Republicans swept aside all the Democratic candidates in 1970, replacing them with George Mason Green, Jr., Allen H. Harrison, Jr., Henry O. Lampe and George P. Shafran. Virginia Democrats experienced a backlash against the sales tax, as well as a speech by President Richard M. Nixon, who urged people to vote Republican in the New Jersey gubernatorial race, but which had broader effects. Courteous Clive L. DuVal II of Fairfax and Byrd Organization stalwart James M. Thomson of Alexandria were the only Democrats elected to the General Assembly from northern Virginia that year.

Mrs. Marshall then helped rebuild the local Democratic party, joking that calling herself a "mere housewife" was the "equivalent of calling yourself a 'simple country lawyer' [alluding to North Carolina's Senator Sam Ervin during the Watergate scandal]. It's a non-threatening phrase that may, or may not indicate you know what's going on." After redistricting following the 1970 census, Arlington lost a seat in the House of Delegates, but in 1972 Marshall again won election to the state house (as did Republican Green) and Democrat John L. Melnick won the third seat in what had become the 22nd Virginia house district. In 1975, Melnick and Marshall and fellow Democrat Warren G. Stambaugh outpolled all the Republican candidates, and Arlington's delegation would remain all-Democrat for years (James F. Almand replacing Melnick in 1977). After the 1980 reapportionment and advent of single-member districts, the district was renumbered the 48th. Marshall continued to win re-election until 1991 (facing no opposition in 1985, 1987 and 1989), when she announced in April that she would not seek re-election, but rather spend more time with her husband and family. She had also served on the executive committees of the National Conference of State Legislatures and the Southern Legislative Conference. Newspapers at the time noted that her retirement, together with Delegate MacDiarmid's two years earlier, Delegate Stambaugh's demise eight months earlier and Delegate Du Val's retirement announced just three weeks before significantly reduced Northern Virginia's seniority and clout in the General Assembly. Julia A. Connally then won the Democratic primary and the general election, and succeeded Marshal.

During her initial stint in the General Assembly, Marshall had helped found the Women's Roundtable. The weekly Wednesday morning meeting when the General Assembly was in session created a network of women legislators and organizations interested in women's issues, and in 1986 also successfully blocked attempts to weaken the state's conflict of interest law. After her re-election in 1972, Marshall rose in seniority and power. She sponsored landmark legislation modernizing state policies concerning the elderly (including equal treatment of widows in inheritance and pension taxes, and rights of nursing home patients), and a variety of issues relating to women and children, intellectually disabled persons and libraries. Marshall also sponsored Virginia's first legislation guaranteeing the return of tenants' security deposits and according rights to people displaced by condominium conversions, the first minimum wage law, and the first automobile inspection law. She became chairman of the Cities, Counties and Towns Committee, as well as served on the Privileges and Elections Committee (the first woman to do so, and rising to chair), the Committee on Health Institutions and Welfare, the Roads and Internal Navigation Committee, and Conservation and Natural Resources Committee.

Marshall served as president of the Virginia Association for Mental Health and of the Virginia Federation of Democratic Women's Clubs, and also served on the Federal Council on Aging (1978-1981). She also served on the board for the Library of Virginia and was active in her church (Rock Spring Congregational Church) and Church Women United, as well as with the American Association of University Women and Phi Beta Kappa.

== Death and legacy ==
Marshall died at Arlington Hospital on October 9, 1992, aged 71, never regaining consciousness after suffering a head injury during a fall at her home while clearing a table. She was survived by her husband, two daughters and two grandchildren. In 2011, Arlington named a senior assisted living facility in her honor. In 2018 she was named one of the Virginia Women in History by the Library of Virginia.

Virginia House of Delegates
Preceded by Kathryn H. Stone	Representing Arlington County; 1966–1970	Succeeded by George Mason Green, Jr.
Preceded by Henry O. Lampe	Representing Arlington County; 1972–1992	Succeeded by Julia A. Connally
