= I Came Out of the Eighteenth Century =

1942 autobiography by John Andrew Rice

- Author: John Andrew Rice
- Subject: Autobiography
- Publisher: Harper and Brothers
- Publication date: 1942
- Pages: 341

I Came Out of the Eighteenth Century is the 1942 autobiography of educator John Andrew Rice.

== Bibliography ==
- "Briefly Noted". The New Yorker. November 7, 1942. p. 83. ISSN 0028-792X.
- Fisher, Ruth Anna (December 1, 1943). "Rev. of I Came Out of the Eighteenth Century". Phylon. 4 (4): 388–390. doi:10.2307/271509. ISSN 0885-6818. JSTOR 271509.
- Kendrick, B. B. (February 1, 1943). "Rev. of I Came Out of the Eighteenth Century". The Journal of Southern History. 9 (1): 135–137. doi:10.2307/2191399. ISSN 0022-4642. JSTOR 2191399.
- Sampson, Harriet (December 26, 1942). "John Rice of Black Mountain". The Nation. p. 726. ISSN 0027-8378.
- Tracy, Henry C. (1943). "Aspects of the American Scene". Common Ground: 118.
- Wright, Cuthbert (December 25, 1942). "Biography (Rev. of I Came Out of the Eighteenth Century)". Commonweal. 37 (10): 258. ISSN 0010-3330.
