= Dorothy Day: Dissenting Voice of the American Century =

2020 biography of Dorothy Day

- First edition
- Author: John Loughery and Blythe Randolph
- Subject: Biography
- Publisher: Simon & Schuster
- Publication date: March 3, 2020
- Pages: 448 p.
- ISBN: 9781982103491

Dorothy Day: Dissenting Voice of the American Century is a 2020 biography of Dorothy Day written by John Loughery and Blythe Randolph and published by Simon & Schuster.

== Bibliography ==
- Armstrong, Karen (March 3, 2020). "Was Dorothy Day a Saint or a Subversive?". The New York Times. ISSN 0362-4331.
- Baxter, Michael J. (April 30, 2020). "Still a Sign of Contradiction". Commonweal.
- Borger, Byron (March 28, 2020). "Bohemian + leftist + Catholic = Dorothy Day, American dissident". Pittsburgh Post-Gazette.
- Cep, Casey (April 6, 2020). "Dorothy Day's Radical Faith". The New Yorker.
- Gribowich, John (March 25, 2020). "Dorothy Day: A Unique Dissenting American Voice". The Tablet.
- Kaiser, Charles (April 19, 2020). "Dorothy Day review: biography of a radical rebel is the masterpiece she deserves". The Guardian. ISSN 0261-3077.
- Margolin, Elaine (March 14, 2020). "Radical Lives: On New Biographies of Rose Pastor Stokes and Dorothy Day". Los Angeles Review of Books.
- Mastromatteo, Mike (May 13, 2020). "Review: The Christ-like (and paradoxical) life of Dorothy Day". America Magazine.
- Power, Samantha (March 6, 2020). "Review – The courage and compassion of Catholic activist Dorothy Day". The Washington Post. ISSN 0190-8286.
