= Joseph Corbin =

Joseph Corbin may refer to:

- Joseph Carter Corbin (1833–1911), American educator
- Joseph Louis Corbin (1797–1859), French general
