= Henry Lampe =

Henry Lampe may refer to:

- Henry Lampe (baseball) (1872–1936), Major League Baseball pitcher
- Henry O. Lampe (1927–2012), member of the Virginia House of Delegates
- Harry Lampe (1874–1939), Australian rules footballer
