= William Aydelotte =

William Aydelotte may refer to:

- William O. Aydelotte, American historian
- William Aydelotte (tennis), American tennis player
