= Metropolitan Washington Council of Governments =

- Formation: 1957; 69 years ago
- Type: Council of Governments
- Tax ID no.: 52-6060391
- Legal status: 501(c)(3) nonprofit organization
- Purpose: To create a more accessible, sustainable, prosperous, and livable National Capital Region.
- Headquarters: 777 N. Capitol Street NE, Washington, D.C., U.S.
- Executive Director: Clark Mercer
- Chair, Board of Directors: Kate Stewart
- Subsidiaries: Center for Public Administration & Services Inc
- Revenue: $53,951,042 (2017)
- Expenses: $54,478,507 (2017)
- Employees: 142 (2016)
- Volunteers: 36 (2016)
- Website: www.mwcog.org

Metropolitan Washington Council of Governments (MWCOG) is an independent, nonprofit association designed to address regional issues confronting Washington, D.C., suburban Maryland, and Northern Virginia. It was founded in 1957.

MWCOG comprises 24 local governments in the Washington metropolitan area, including the Maryland and Virginia state legislatures, the U.S. Senate, and the U.S. House of Representatives. About 300 local, state, and federally elected officials make up its membership. and formally incorporated on May 28, 1965.

== Functions ==
=== Transportation ===
MWCOG has a role in supporting the development of transportation facilities in the region, including the Washington Metro subway system and Washington Dulles International Airport.

MWCOG supports the National Capital Region Transportation Planning Board, the federally designated metropolitan planning organization for the metropolitan Washington area. The National Capital Region Transportation Planning Board is responsible for ensuring state and federal approval of funding for transportation projects. National Capital Region Transportation Planning Board became associated with MWCOG in 1966. National Capital Region Transportation Planning Board's data informs officials on subjects like regional travel patterns and highway and transit performance. Recent projects include identifying regional transportation priorities and funding strategies, improving access for people with disabilities, and better coordinating transportation and land use decisions.

=== Environment ===
Through the Metropolitan Washington Air Quality Committee, which is the entity certified by the mayor of the District of Columbia and the governors of Maryland and Virginia to prepare an air-quality plan for the Washington metropolitan area under the federal Clean Air Act Amendments of 1990, officials prepare clean air plans. These plans have led to steady improvement in regional air quality according to MWCOG.

MWCOG supports ongoing efforts to revitalize the Chesapeake Bay, the Anacostia River, other local waterways, and wastewater and storm-water planning, and water-supply protection.

MWCOG guides the regional effort to reduce greenhouse-gas emissions by promoting alternative energy sources, energy conservation, and green building and fleet policies.

=== Planning and housing ===
MWCOG's Community Planning and Services program promotes a economic policies, and housing options. MWCOG offers strategies for more development in the region's mixed-use activity centers and provides the region with population, employment, and housing forecasts, and data on area industries and labor, affordable housing, and homelessness.

=== Public safety and health ===
MWCOG's public safety and health program brings together area officials, emergency planners, and first responders to improve homeland security and emergency preparedness.

MWCOG provides regional crime reports and convenes conferences on topics such as preventing the spread of HIV/AIDS, gangs, and childhood obesity.

== Member Jurisdictions ==
Member	Location	Population
Washington, D.C.	District of Columbia	689,545
Bladensburg, Town of	Maryland	9,396
Bowie, City of	Maryland	58,709
Charles County	Maryland	166,819
College Park, City of	Maryland	32,123
Frederick, City of	Maryland	72,824
Frederick County	Maryland	268,755
Gaithersburg, City of	Maryland	67,815
Greenbelt, City of	Maryland	23,200
Hyattsville, City of	Maryland	18,174
Laurel, City of	Maryland	25,519
Montgomery County	Maryland	1,055,110
Prince George's County	Maryland	908,743
Rockville, City of	Maryland	68,181
Takoma Park, City of	Maryland	17,751
Alexandria, City of	Virginia	160,146
Arlington County	Virginia	238,476
Fairfax, City of	Virginia	24,607
Fairfax County	Virginia	1,145,670
Loudoun County	Virginia	429,570
Falls Church, City of	Virginia	14,917
Manassas, City of	Virginia	41,163
Manassas Park, City of	Virginia	16,998
Prince William County	Virginia	478,535

== Chairpersons ==
Council of Governments Board of Directors Chairmen
Year(s)	Chairman	Jurisdiction
1957–61	Robert F. McLaughlin	District of Columbia
1962	Charles R. Fenwick	Virginia General Assembly (Arlington County)
1962	Brig. Gen. F. J. Clarke	District of Columbia
1963	Anne A. Wilkins	Fairfax County
1964	Roye L. Lowry	Arlington County
1965	Brig. Gen. C. M. Duke	District of Columbia
1966–67	Achilles M. Tuchtan	Rockville
1968	Frederick A. Babson	Fairfax County
1969	Francis B. Francois	Prince George's County
1970	Joseph L. Fisher	Arlington County
1971	Gilbert Hahn Jr.	District of Columbia
1972–73	Martha V. Pennino	Fairfax County
1974–75	Sterling Tucker	District of Columbia
1976	Francis B. Francois	Prince George's County
1977	Harold L. Miller	Falls Church
1978–79	Arrington L. Dixon	District of Columbia
1980–81	Elizabeth L. Scull	Montgomery County
1981–83	Carl F. Hendrickson	Loudoun County
1984–85	H. R. Crawford	District of Columbia
1986–87	Gil Weidenfeld	Greenbelt
1988–89	Ellen M. Bozman	Arlington County
1990	Betty Ann Kane	District of Columbia
1991	James E. Nathanson	District of Columbia
1992–93	Hilda Pemberton	Prince George's County
1994	Patricia S. Ticer	Alexandria
1995	Jack Evans	District of Columbia
1996	William E. Hanna Jr.	Montgomery County
1997	Robert B. Dix Jr.	Fairfax County
1998	Charlene Drew Jarvis	District of Columbia
1999	M.H. Jim Estepp	Prince George's County
2000	Gerald E. Connolly	Fairfax County
2001	Carol Schwartz	District of Columbia
2002	Bruce R. Williams	Takoma Park
2003	Mary K. Hill	Prince William County
2005	Judith F. Davis	Greenbelt
2006	Jay Fisette	Arlington County
2007	Vincent C. Gray	District of Columbia
2008	Michael Knapp	Montgomery County
2009	Penny Gross	Fairfax County
2010	Kwame Brown	District of Columbia
2011	Andrea Harrison	Prince George's County
2012	Frank Principi	Prince William County
2013	Karen Young	City of Frederick
2014	Phil Mendelson	District of Columbia
2015	William Euille	City of Alexandria
2016	Roger Berliner	Montgomery County
2017	Kenyan McDuffie	District of Columbia
2018	Matt Letourneau	Loudoun County
2019	Robert White	District of Columbia
2020	Derrick L. Davis	Prince George's County
2021	Robert White	District of Columbia
2023	Kate Stewart	Montgomery County
