= Triple Crown of Canoe Racing =

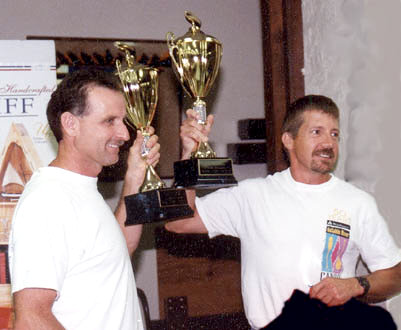
Champions of the 2001 Triple Crown Canoe Racing, their second Triple Crown Championship in a row, Serge Corbin (L), 44, of St-Boniface de Shawinigan, Quebec, and Jeff Kolka, 42, of Grayling, Michigan

The Triple Crown of Canoe Racing (French: La Triple Couronne de Canots Long Parcours) is a canoe marathon series consisting of:

- The General Clinton Canoe Regatta: staged Memorial Day on New York's Susquehanna River, a one-day, non-stop 70 mile race from Cooperstown to Bainbridge.
- The Au Sable River Canoe Marathon: a non-stop race from Grayling Charter Township to Oscoda on Michigan's Au Sable River during the last weekend of July.
- La Classique internationale de canots de la Mauricie: staged Labor Day weekend on Quebec's Saint-Maurice River, a three-day race from La Tuque to Trois-Rivières.

It is a popular spectator event and an intense competition. Competitors race in USCA C2 canoes wherein they maintain a pace of 50 to 80 strokes per minute. Athletes must complete portages at a running pace.

The triple crown was established in 1992 and recognizes the performances by athletes who compete at all three races.

== Champions of The Triple Crown of Canoe Racing ==
- 1992: Serge Corbin, Quebec & Brett Stockton, Michigan
- 1993- 1995: Serge Corbin & Solomon Carriere, Saskatchewan
- 1996-1999: Serge Corbin
- 2000-2003 Serge Corbin & Jeff Kolka, Michigan
- 2004 Andrew Triebold, Michigan & Steve Lajoie, Quebec
- 2005 Matthew Rimer, Michigan
- 2006 Andrew Triebold & Matthew Rimern
- 2007 Matthew Rimer
- 2008-2013: Andrew Triebold & Steve Lajoie
- 2014 Andrew Triebold
- 2015 Mathieu Pellerin & Guillaume Blais
- 2016 Mathieu Pellerin & Guillaume Blais
- 2017 Steve Lajoie & Guillaume Blais
- 2018 Steve Lajoie & Andrew Triebold
- 2019 Steve Lajoie
- 2020 No races
- 2021 Only General Clnton was run
- 2022 Steve Lajoie
- 2023 Wesley Dean & Steve Lajoie
- 2024 Guillaume Blais & Mike Davis
- 2025 Weston Willoughby & Travis Mecklenburg
