= 4008 =

4008 may refer to:

== Vehicles ==
- General Motors TDH-4008, a 1944–1945 American transit bus
- General Motors TDM-4008, a 1944–1945 American transit bus
- Peugeot 4008, a 2012–2017 Japanese-French compact SUV
- Peugeot 3008, a 2016–present French compact SUV, sold in China as Peugeot 4008

== Other uses ==
- 4008 Corbin, a stony Phocaea asteroid from the inner regions of the asteroid belt
- A4008 road, a local road in England, United Kingdom
- Intel 4008, an 8-bit memory latch to be used in conjunction with the Intel 4004 processor
