= Al Eisenberg =

American politician

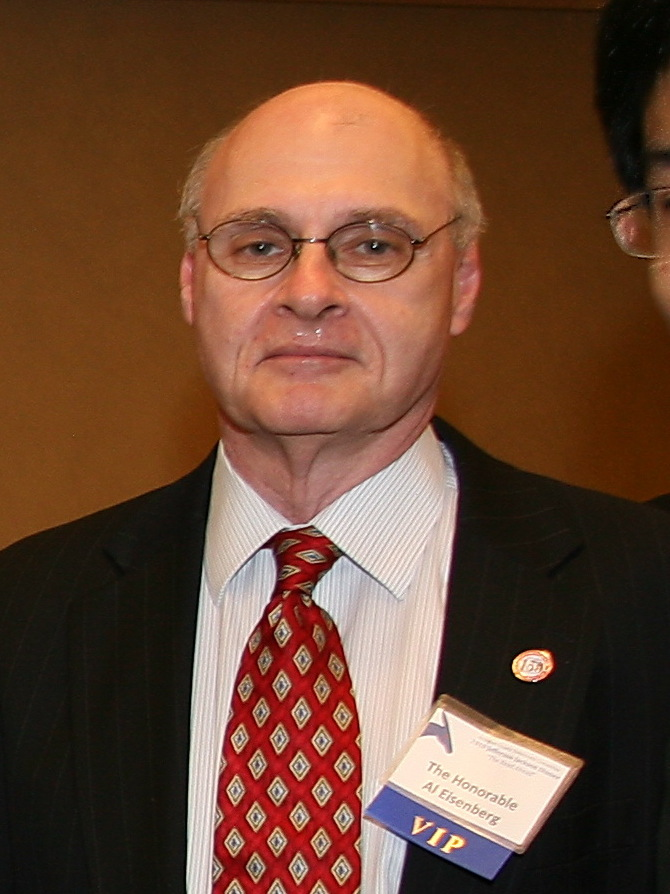
- Eisenberg in 2010

Member of the Virginia House of Delegates from the 47th district
- In office January 14, 2004 – January 13, 2010
- Preceded by: Jim Almand
- Succeeded by: Patrick Hope

Personal details
- Born: Albert Charles Eisenberg; October 15, 1946 (age 80) Jersey City, New Jersey, U.S.
- Died: October 15, 2022
- Party: Democratic
- Spouse: Sharon Eileen Davis
- Children: Matthew, Alex
- Education: University of Richmond (B.A.); Hampton Institute (M.A.)
- Occupation: Policy consultant

Military service
- Allegiance: United States
- Branch/service: United States Navy
- Years of service: 1968–1969

Albert Charles "Al" Eisenberg (October 15, 1946 – November 15, 2022) was an American politician. He served in the Virginia House of Delegates 2004–2010, representing the 47th district in the Arlington County suburbs of Washington, D.C. Prior to that, he served on the Arlington County Board 1984–1999. Eisenberg was a member of the Democratic Party.

Eisenberg served on the House committees on Agriculture, Chesapeake and Natural Resources (2004–2009), General Laws (2008–2009), and Science and Technology (2004–2009).

Eisenberg's wife, Sharon E. Davis, was chief clerk/chief minority clerk of the United States House Committee on Energy and Commerce 1981–2011.

== Electoral history ==
Date	Election	Candidate	Party	Votes	%
Virginia House of Delegates, 47th district
Nov 4, 2003	General	A C Eisenberg	Democratic	8,689	65.45
Nov 4, 2003	General	R C Hoff	Republican	4,569	34.42
Nov 4, 2003	General	Write Ins		18	0.14
Nov 4, 2003	General	Jim Almand retired; seat stayed Democratic			
Nov 8, 2005	General	A C Eisenberg	Democratic	18,438	97.44
Nov 8, 2005	General	Write Ins		484	2.56
Nov 6, 2007	General	Albert C. Eisenberg	Democratic	9,962	96.99
Nov 6, 2007	General	Write Ins		309	3.00
