= Lynchburg Presbyterian Church =

Historic church in South Carolina, United States

- U.S. National Register of Historic Places
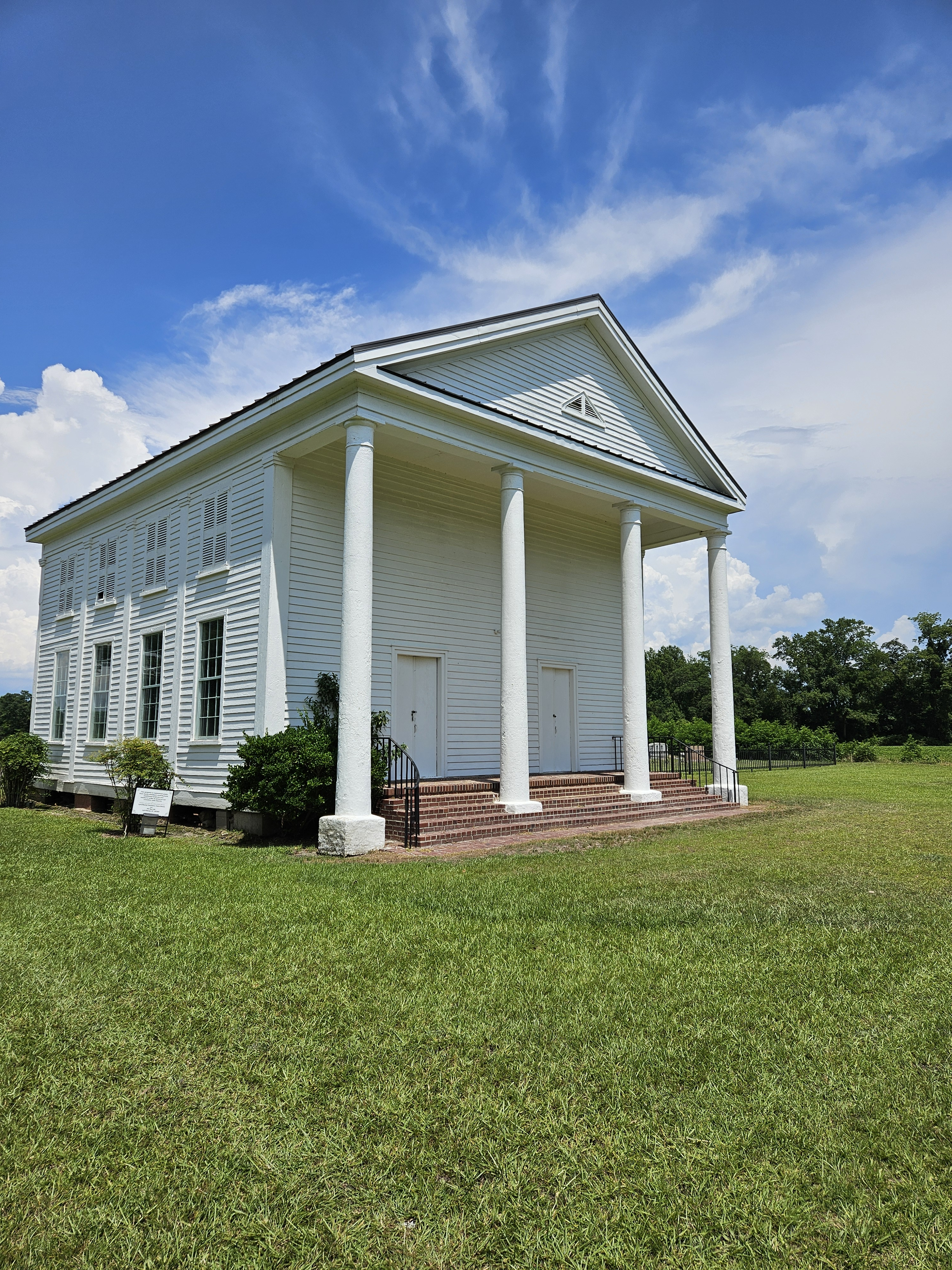

- Location within South Carolina Location within the United States
- Location: South Carolina Highway 341, South Lynchburg, South Carolina
- Coordinates: 34°3′18″N 80°3′59″W
- Area: 1.9 acres (0.77 ha)
- Built: 1855
- Architectural style: Greek Revival
- NRHP reference No.: 04001088
- Added to NRHP: October 01, 2004

Lynchburg Presbyterian Church is a historic Presbyterian church located at South Lynchburg, Lee County, South Carolina. It was built in 1855, and is a two-story temple-form Greek Revival style building with an engaged tetrastyle portico featuring four massive stuccoed solid brick columns. The interior is primarily a single room with plaster walls and 21 foot high ceiling, undecorated except for a large circular plaster medallion in the center.

It was added to the National Register of Historic Places in 2004.
