= Tanglewood Plantation =

Historic house in South Carolina, United States

- U.S. National Register of Historic Places
- Location within South Carolina Location within the United States
- Location: Southeast of Lynchburg on South Carolina Highway 341, near Lynchburg, South Carolina
- Coordinates: 34°01′55″N 80°01′14″W
- Area: 10 acres (4.0 ha)
- Built: c. 1850
- Built by: Rev. William H. Smith
- Architectural style: Greek Revival
- NRHP reference No.: 77001229
- Added to NRHP: September 22, 1977

Tanglewood Plantation, also known as the Ellison Durant Smith House, is a historic plantation house located at Lynchburg, Lee County, South Carolina. It was built about 1850, and is a two-story, Greek Revival-style clapboard house. It was the seat of a plantation whose white owners enslaved a large number of African-Americans, including the ancestors of political activist Briahna Joy Gray. The farm's primary crop was cotton.

The building has a two-story pedimented front portico supported by four square columns on freestanding brick piers. A two-story projecting wing was added to the west façade in 1915, as well as a kitchen ell alteration to the south (rear) façade. Outbuildings include a pine clapboard kitchen building, a round-cut log constructed smokehouse, and a one-room schoolhouse.

Tanglewood was the birthplace of the educationalist John Andrew Rice. It was later the home of Ellison Durant "Cotton Ed" Smith, a United States Senator from 1908 to 1944 widely known for his virulently racist and segregationist views and his advocacy of white supremacy. It was also the home of Alexander Coke Smith, Bishop of the Methodist Conference from 1902 until 1906.

It was added to the National Register of Historic Places in 1977.
