= Canoe marathon =

Paddling sport

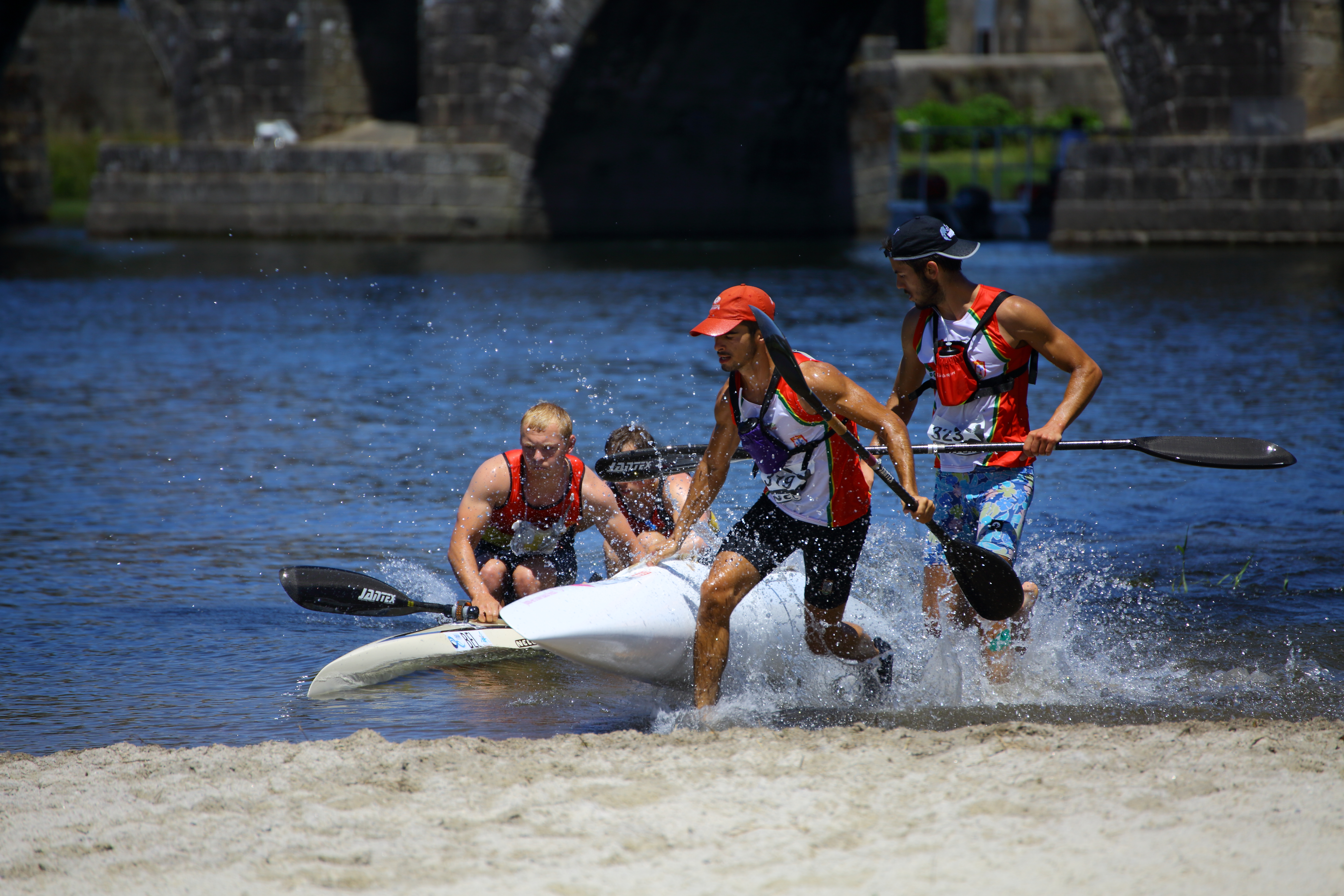
- Competitors in the Men's K2 event at the 2017 European Championships portaging
- Highest governing body: International Canoe Federation

Characteristics
- Team members: 1, 2 and rarely 4
- Mixed-sex: Separate competitions
- Type: Water sport, outdoor
- Equipment: Kayak or Canoe, paddle (single or double bladed)
- Venue: River, artificial lake, canal
- Glossary: Glossary of canoeing terms

Presence
- Country or region: Worldwide
- World Games: 2013

Canoe marathon is a water sport in which athletes paddle a kayak (using a double-bladed paddle) or canoe (using a single-bladed paddle) over a long distance to the finish line. The International Canoe Federation (ICF) defines standard-distance races as at least 10 kilometres (6.2 mi) long, with no upper limit, while short-distance races are between 3.4 kilometres (2.1 mi) and 10 kilometres (6.2 mi). Many events are raced down rivers or across mixed water bodies and may include sections known as portages, where athletes must carry their boats over land often to bypass obstacles or between stretches of water. Some of the longest race are staged over several days.

The sport is governed internationally by the ICF, which organises the annual ICF Canoe Marathon World Championships. Distances vary by category, but senior world championship races typically cover between 20 and 35 kilometres for both men and women, with shorter courses for junior and masters competitors. At the world championships races can be contested in single or double boats, using both canoes (C1, C2) and kayaks (K1, K2).

Competitive canoe marathon racing developed from long-distance touring and endurance paddling traditions popular in Europe and North America during the early 20th century. The first international marathon events were held in the 1950s, and the discipline was officially recognised by the ICF in 1963. Today, canoe marathon has a strong global following, with major races such as the Devizes to Westminster International Canoe Marathon (United Kingdom) and the Dusi Canoe Marathon (South Africa) drawing both elite and recreational paddlers. European nations, particularly Hungary, Spain, and Denmark, have historically dominated international competition.

== Classes ==
Racers are generally divided into different classes though the available classes at each race will vary. Example classes are:

- K1
- K2
- K4
- C1
- C2
- C3
- C6
- OC1
- OC2

K refers to a kayak, C a canoe and OC to an outrigger. The number refers to the number of paddlers in the boat. Some included on this list are very infrequently raced at the marathon discipline, but C1, C2 and K1 are virtually in every race. K1, K2, K4, C1, and C2 classes are permitted in International Canoe Federation events.

== Events ==
- ICF Canoe Marathon World Championships, an International Canoe Federation competition
- The long running Avon Descent held in Western Australia, a two day whitewater marathon river race over 124 kilometres (77 mi) for kayaks and canoes where paddlers compete alongside powerboats.
- The MR340 is an annual 340 miles (550 km) continuous race on the Missouri River from Kansas City to St. Charles, Missouri. Participants have 88 hours to complete the race.
- Devizes to Westminster International Canoe Marathon: A race over 125 miles (201 km) of canals and rivers from Devizes to Westminster, England which can either be completed "straight through" or over four days. The course includes portages around 77 locks. There are no rules about the boat specifications but most competitors use ICF kayaks.
- The Dusi Canoe Marathon in South Africa: a three-day race over 120 kilometres (75 mi). Classes include K1, K2, white water, touring kayak, and touring canoe.
- The Eleven Cities Tour in Friesland: a 36 hours max race over 200 kilometres (120 mi). Classes include K1, K2, white water and touring kayak.
- The Fish River Canoe Marathon: a two-day river race over (81 kilometres (50 mi)) in South Africa in ICF-style K1s and K2s. K3s are also run.
- The YMCA Massive Murray Paddle, 404 kilometres (251 mi) down the Murray River in Australia. Classes include ICF canoes and kayaks, as well as touring craft as defined in Australian Canoeing regulations, surf skis, outrigger canoes and recreational paddle-craft such as sea kayaks.
- The Hawkesbury Canoe Classic. 111 kilometres (69 mi) down the Hawkesbury River in NSW Australia from Windsor to Brooklyn. The event is run at night (under moonlight on some years). Classes include canoes, kayaks and skis, as well as limited dragon boats.
- The Texas Water Safari a race over 262 miles (422 km) from the interior Texas south to the Gulf of Mexico. It must be completed in 100 hours. Classes include:
  - Solo: USCA C-1, unlimited (any human powered boat)
  - Tandem: USCA aluminum, standard, USCA C-2, unlimited
  - Up to six crew: unlimited. The record time of 30 hours was done in a six-man canoe.
- The Triple Crown of Canoe Racing consists of three separate marathon races with a total distance of 308 miles (496 km) over 5 days of racing:
  - the General Clinton Canoe Regatta, held in May on Memorial Day weekend, one-day 70 miles (110 km) race,
  - the Au Sable River Canoe Marathon, held on last weekend of July, overnight 120 miles (190 km) race, and
  - the Classique international de canots de la Mauricie, held in September on Labor Day, three-day 191 kilometres (119 mi) race.
- The Adirondack Canoe Classic, also known as "The 90 Miler," is a three-day, 90 miles (140 km) canoe race from Old Forge to Saranac Lake in the Adirondacks of New York, United States. Classes range from C1 Stock to war canoes and traditional guide boats.
- La Ruta Maya: a four-day river race in Belize
- The Muskoka River X: a 24-hour race over 133 kilometres (83 mi) of lakes and rivers in Ontario, Canada. The course includes 20 portages. Paddlers must carry expedition gear such as shelters and emergency rations. Classes include canoe (single and tandem), kayak, and stand up paddle board.
- The Yukon River Quest: a 715 kilometres (444 mi) wilderness paddling race from Whitehorse to Dawson City in The Yukon, Canada. Classes include canoes and kayaks (single and tandem), and voyageur (six-person) canoes.
- The Yukon 1000: a biennial wilderness race over 1,000 miles (1,600 km) of the Yukon River lasting 7–12 days. Classes include K1, K2, C1, C2 and voyageur canoes.

== See also ==
- ICF Canoe Marathon World Championships
- ICF Canoe Sprint World Championships
- Canoe sprint
