= Patrick Hope =

American politician from Virginia

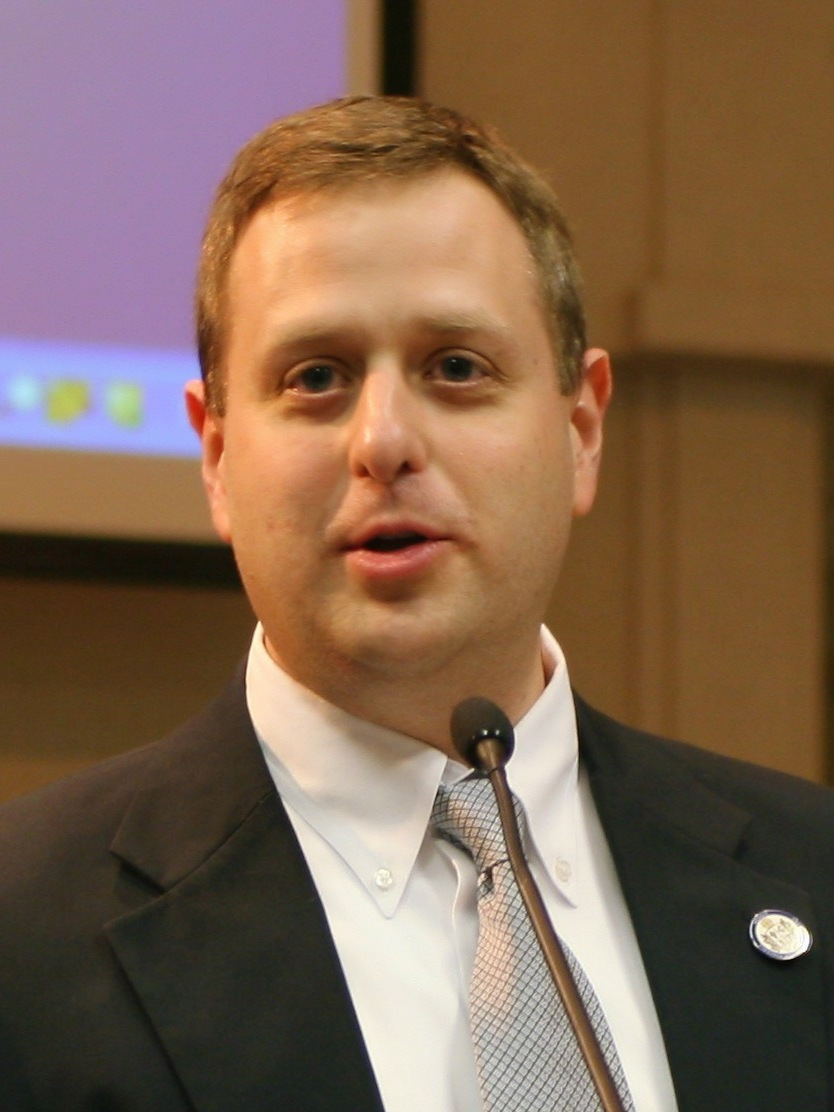
- Hope in 2010

Member of the Virginia House of Delegates
- Incumbent
- Assumed office January 13, 2010
- Preceded by: Al Eisenberg
- Constituency: 47th district (2010–2024); 1st district (2024–present)

Personal details
- Born: Patrick Alan Hope; March 6, 1972 (age 54) San Antonio, Texas, U.S.
- Party: Democratic
- Spouse: Kristen Anne Satariano
- Children: 3
- Education: St. Mary's University, Texas
- Profession: Attorney
- Committees: Public Safety; Courts of Justice; Health Welfare and Institutions
- Website: www.hopeforvirginia.org

Patrick Alan Hope (born March 6, 1972) is an American politician. Since 2010, he has served in the Virginia House of Delegates, representing the 1st district in Arlington County, outside Washington, D.C. Hope is a member of the Democratic Party.

== Early life and education ==
Hope was born in San Antonio in 1972. He attended San Antonio Community College and then went to St. Mary's University there, receiving a B.A. degree in 1993. He then moved to Washington to attend the Catholic University of America, where he received an M.A. in 1996 and a J.D. from the Columbus School of Law in 2001.

== House of Delegates ==
As of May 2025, Hope serves as the Chair the House Courts of Justice Committee, the Public Safety Committee, and the Health and Human Resources Committee.

On February 8, 2019, after two women had publicly accused Democratic Lieutenant Governor Justin Fairfax of sexual assault, Hope announced that he would introduce articles of impeachment against Fairfax within three days later, unless the latter resigned. Hope backed off the plan to begin impeachment proceedings, explaining that more conversations were needed before moving forward.

== Political positions ==
=== Gun control ===
As Chairman of the House Public Safety Committee, Hope helped lead efforts to pass several gun safety measures between 2020 and 2021. These included universal background checks; an extreme risk protective order allowing law enforcement to temporarily confiscate firearms from individuals deemed at risk to themselves or others; a one-handgun-a-month purchase limit; requirements for gun owners to report lost or stolen firearms; stronger penalties for leaving unsecured firearms in ways that endanger children, and legislation allowing localities to prohibit firearms in government buildings.

== Electoral history ==
Hope won a five-way Democratic primary in June 2009 to replace retiring Delegate Al Eisenberg as the 47th district delegate. The following November, he won the general election with almost 64% of the vote against two opponents.

Date	Election	Candidate	Party	Votes	%
Virginia House of Delegates, 47th district
June 9, 2009	Democratic primary	Patrick A. Hope		2,947	36.60
June 9, 2009	Democratic primary	Alan E. Howze		1,553	19.28
June 9, 2009	Democratic primary	Adam J. Parkhomenko		1,388	17.24
June 9, 2009	Democratic primary	Miles F. Grant		1,136	14.11
June 9, 2009	Democratic primary	Andres Tobar		1,027	12.75
November 3, 2009	General	Patrick A. Hope	Democratic	13,540	63.54
November 3, 2009	General	Eric J. Brescia	Republican	6,758	31.71
November 3, 2009	General	Joshua F. Ruebner	Green	981	4.60
November 3, 2009	General	Write Ins		29	0.13
November 3, 2009	General	Al Eisenberg retired; seat stayed Democratic			
November 8, 2011	General	Patrick A. Hope	Democratic	12,101	96.87
November 8, 2011	General	Write Ins		390	3.12
November 5, 2013	General	Patrick A. Hope	Democratic	20,308	76.4
November 5, 2013	General	Laura Rebecca Delhomme	Libertarian	6,077	22.9
November 5, 2013	General	Write Ins		207	0.8
November 3, 2015	General	Patrick A. Hope	Democratic	11,656	77.4
November 3, 2015	General	Janet Helen Murphy	Independent	3,281	21.8
November 3, 2015	General	Write Ins		120	0.8
November 7, 2017	General	Patrick A. Hope	Democratic	29,706	96.2
November 7, 2017	General	Write Ins		1,171	3.8
November 5, 2019	General	Patrick A. Hope	Democratic	20,860	96.12
November 5, 2019	General	Write Ins		843	3.88
November 2, 2021	General	Patrick A. Hope	Democratic	31,078	78.2
November 2, 2021	General	Laura Hall	Republican	8,549	21.5
November 2, 2021	General	Write Ins		112	0.3
November 7, 2023	General	Patrick A. Hope	Democratic	23,584	95.5
November 7, 2023	General	Write Ins		1,122	4.5

== See also ==
- Virginia elections, 2009
- Arlington, Virginia

Virginia House of Delegates
Preceded by Al Eisenberg	Member of the Virginia House of Delegates from the 47th district 2010–2024	Succeeded by Wren Williams
Preceded by Terry Kilgore	Member of the Virginia House of Delegates from the 1st district 2024–Present	Incumbent
