= Valerie Sayers =

American novelist

- Born: 1952 (age 73–74); Beaufort, South Carolina, U.S.
- Education: Fordham University; Columbia University
- Occupation: Novelist
- Writing career
- Notable awards: Pushcart Prize

Valerie Sayers (born 1952) is an American writer and the author of "The Age of Infidelity and Other Stories" (2020) as well as six novels: The Powers (2013); Brain Fever (1996); The Distance Between Us (1994); Who Do You Love (1991); How I Got Him Back, or, Under the Cold Moon’s Shine (1989); and Due East (1987). Due East (1987) is based on Sayers's life growing up in Beaufort, a predominately Protestant community, as a Catholic. Her first three novels are a trilogy, and all based in South Carolina. It is only until her fourth novel, The Distance Between Us (1994), the setting shifts from South Carolina to New York. Brain Fever and Who Do You Love were named New York Times "Notable Books of the Year", and the 2002 film Due East is based on her first two novels. Reviewing Who Do You Love, The Chicago Tribune declared: "To say that Valerie Sayers is a natural-born writer wildly underestimates the facts…. She has carved out for herself a corner of the South as clearly delineated as Faulkner’s famous Yoknapatawpha County, a sense of the importance and holiness of place that calls to mind Eudora Welty’s writing on the subject."

== Biography ==
Sayers was born and raised in Beaufort, South Carolina. She was educated at Fordham and Columbia. She lived in New York for many years. Her writing has considered the experience of Irish Catholics in the American South, the forces of segregation and Civil Rights, and the place of pacifism in domestic politics.

Sayers is most often read in the lineage of Mary Flannery O'Connor, Carson McCullers, Pat Conroy, and Walker Percy. Her stories, essays, and reviews have appeared widely in such publications as The New York Times, Washington Post, Commonweal, Zoetrope, Ploughshares, Image, Witness, and Prairie Schooner, and have been cited in Best American Short Stories and Best American Essays. Her short story "The Other Woman" is published in Cabbage and Bones: An Anthology of Irish American Women's Fiction (1997).

The Powers, which the Washington Post described as "brilliantly realized...in brutally elegant prose" opens in the summer of 1941, and holds the war fever then sweeping across Europe in tension with the contemporary baseball mania sweeping up the United States, a fever fueled by the Yankees' Joe DiMaggio. The journal Image: Art, Faith, Mystery featured an interview with Sayers on "Baseball and Fiction".

Northwestern University Press reissued her first five novels in 2013. Sayers was William R. Kenan, Jr. Professor of English at the University of Notre Dame.

Critical discussions of Sayers's work appear in Mary E. Reichardt's Catholic Women Writers: A Bio-bibliographical Sourcebook (2001) and in Bryan Giemza's Catholic Writers and the Invention of the American South (2013).

Sayers's essay "The Word Cure: Cancer, Language, and Prayer" appears in the journal Image.

== Awards and honors ==
Sayers's literary awards include two Pushcart Prize for fiction and a National Endowment for the Arts literature fellowship. She is a member of the South Carolina Academy of Authors and received a Governor's Award in the Humanities in 2025.
