= Yukon River Quest =

The Yukon River Quest is the world's longest annual canoe and kayak race. The Yukon River Quest's stated mission is, "To challenge paddlers in a world class wilderness event – a race to the midnight sun." The race takes place in late June / early July.

== Route ==
The race is 715 km / 444 miles on the Yukon River from Whitehorse to Dawson City. There are six checkpoints along the route including two mandatory stops. Teams must spend 7 hours in Carmacks and 3 hours in Coffee Creek.

== History ==
The Yukon River Quest was created in 1999 by canoeists in Whitehorse who thought it would be fun to host a canoe marathon event. It has evolved into a world class, international event. It is hosted by the Yukon River Marathon Paddlers Association.

2016 was the 18th Yukon River Quest. Teams from 14 countries competed in the event. The water levels for 2016 were the lowest they have ever been during the race, so no records were set. Team #57 "Perfect Storm", a tandem men's canoe team, won the race in 46 hours 14 minutes and 56 seconds. 77 of 93 teams completed the race in 2016 including 9 of 11 stand up paddle boards. The influx of paddlers and support team members brings extra business to Whitehorse in the summer.

The record for the course was set by a men's voyageur canoe team in 2008. Team Kisseynew won in 39 hours 32 minutes and 43 seconds.

== Rules ==
The race must be completed in under 85 hours. Basic survival equipment is required. A SPOT device must be tracking each team at all times. The official race rules are updated annually.
