= John L. Melnick =

American politician

Jack Melnick

Member of the Virginia House of Delegates from Arlington
- In office January 1972 – January 1978 Serving with Mary A. R. Marshall, Wallace G. Dickson, William M. Lightsey
- Preceded by: Henry O. Lampe
- Succeeded by: James F. Almand

Personal details
- Born: April 19, 1935; Alexandria, Virginia
- Died: August 21, 2013; Arlington, Virginia, U.S.
- Political party: Democratic
- Spouse: Marjory Helter
- Education: Roanoke College
- Alma mater: University of Virginia

John Latane Melnick (April 19, 1935 – August 21, 2013) was a Virginia lawyer and Democratic politician who represented Arlington, Virginia, in the Virginia General Assembly for six years.

== Early and family life ==
John Latane Melnick was born on April 19, 1935, in Alexandria, Virginia, to nearby Arlington County's first health officer, Norbert Melnick (1897-1961). His father had been a Polish soldier during World War I but captured by the Germans. He escaped from prison, fled through Holland to the United States, and volunteered to serve in the U.S. Army. Trained as medic, the senior Melnick saw further action in the European theatre and ultimately earned burial at Arlington National Cemetery. His Arlington County job (which Norbert Melnick accepted after his military discharge) took him to schools (where he inoculated children against and quarantined children with various contagious diseases) as well as the county's dairy farms (five at the time, where he assured milk would not sicken children in the D.C. Metropolitan area); Health Inspector Melnick even inspected the White House food service facilities at the invitation of President Dwight D. Eisenhower). Norman Melnick met and married schoolteacher Myrtle Waring (1904-2003) from Dunnsville, Virginia, and they would have several sons and daughters.

Their third child and second son, John was raised in Arlington, although he often noted he was actually born in nearby Alexandria, because then-rural Arlington County lacked a hospital. Educated in the local public schools including James Monroe Elementary and Swanson Middle School, he graduated from Washington-Lee High School in 1953. He then attended Roanoke College briefly (because his elder brother Norbert Waring Melnick Jr. had studied there before receiving an appointment at the U.S. Naval Academy and becoming a career military officer). Jack Melnick sought a larger school (since Roanoke College was smaller than his 3000 student high school) and transferred to the University of Virginia, graduating in 1958 with a degree in commerce. He remained in Charlottesville during the next three winters, studying at the law school during the Commonwealth's Massive Resistance crisis, and receiving his legal degree in 1961.

Jack Melnick married Marjory Helter and they raised two sons and two daughters during their 52-year marriage.

== Career ==
Melnick practiced law in his hometown (and adjacent Falls Church, Virginia) his entire career. For the first two years after his admission to the Virginia bar in 1961, Melnick was a part-time assistant district attorney under Commonwealth and County Attorney Bill Hassan, which also caused him to be the assistant city attorney and advise the County Board and department heads. He also practiced law with Ken McFarland Smith and David Kenny, but eventually established his own private legal practice, which came to specialize in probate law. Jack Melnick also served 25 years as a commissioner in chancery of the Arlington County Circuit Court, and as president of the Arlington Bar Association, as well as on a local drug task force, the Arlington Police Trial Board (chairman), Virginia State Crime Commission, Energy Crisis Commission, Commission on Speedy Trials and the county Legislative Advisory Committee. He taught criminal law and criminal evidence for eight years at the George Washington University Law School across the Potomac River.

His son Paul followed his footsteps and became as lawyer as well as partner in Melnick & Melnick for many years. Jack Melnick was also active in the Masons, Kiwanis and local Chamber of Commerce. He served as director of United Savings & Loan Association, the local YMCA, the Arlington Symphony Association, and the Kiwanis.

After the Republican victories in the 1969 state and 1970 national elections, Melnick (who had been active among Arlington's Young Democrats) became one of the Democratic candidates for the three-member 22nd legislative district in 1971. He won, and was the party's leading vote-getter in 1971 (when Democrats unseated 2 of the 3 Republicans elected in 1969) and in 1973 and 1975 (when Arlington's delegation again consisted of 3 Democrats). In 1977 Melnick decided not to run for re-election to the Virginia House, but instead sought his party's nomination for Attorney General of Virginia. He came in third of four candidates, winning about 21% of the primary vote, and did not again run for public office. The Democratic primary's victor, Richmond delegate Edward E. Lane, won 35.4% of the primary vote, but lost the general election to Republican Marshall Coleman (who reminded some voters of Lane's role in Massive Resistance). Melnick's major accomplishment as a legislator was establishment of the Virginia Crime Victims Compensation Fund, based on models in England, New Zealand and several other states. It was funded primarily by federal grants, and later financed forensic laboratory tests of sexual assault evidence kits as well as responses to mass shootings. The original plan limited reimbursements to $10,000 per victim, but by the time of Melnick's death, the limit had been raised to $25,000.

== Death and legacy ==
Melnick died at Arlington Hospital (now Virginia Hospital Center) on August 21, 2013. He was survived by his wife, two sons, two daughters and numerous grandchildren. He participated in two oral histories archived at the Arlington Public Library: one concerning his mother's life and another about his guiding Arlington's involvement in the sister cities program, especially with Aachen, Germany, and Coyoachan, Mexico, and service as president of Arlington's sister city program for four years. The library also has numerous records and photographs of his father, Norbert Melnick, and nominated him for an entry in the Dictionary of Virginia Biography.

Virginia House of Delegates
Preceded by Henry O. Lampe	Representing Arlington County; 1972–1978	Succeeded by James F. Almand
