= Ellen M. Bozman =

American community activist and politician

Chair of the Arlington County Board
- In office January 1974 – December 1997
- Preceded by: Kenneth Haggerty
- Succeeded by: Jay Fisette

Personal details
- Born: Ellen Marie McConnell; April 21, 1925 Springfield, Illinois
- Died: January 8, 2009 (aged 83) Arlington County, Virginia
- Education: Northwestern University
- Profession: Politician

Ellen M. Bozman (April 21, 1925 – January 8, 2009) was an American community activist and politician in Arlington County, Virginia, for nearly four decades. She became involved in politics in the early 1960s, first as an independent and later as a Democrat, and was president of the Arlington League of Women Voters from 1963 to 1965. She served six terms on the county board from 1973 to 1997, including six years as Chair and five years as vice-chair. After her retirement from the board, she remained active in community issues such as affordable housing, health care, and education.

== Career ==
Before her career in politics, Bozman was a personnel analyst with the Bureau of the Budget. In the early 1960s, she began her foray into the political realm, joining the Arlington League of Women Voters, where she serving as voter services chairwoman and later president of the league from 1963 to 1965. In those roles, she supported the desegregation of Arlington County Public Schools. Later, as chairwoman of the Health and Welfare Council, she oversaw a study of children with working parents and helped launch the first after-school programs in the county. She was also instrumental in the creation of Arlington's first nursing homes.

Bozman was first elected to the Arlington County Board in 1973, defeating former Delegate Henry O. Lampe. She served a record six terms on the board before choosing against running for re-election in 1997. She ran as an independent until her last campaign, when she ran as a Democrat. In each election, she was endorsed by the Arlington Democratic Committee and the nonpartisan political coalition Arlingtonians for a Better County.

She first became Vice-Chair of the five-member Board in 1975 and Chair in 1976, and later served as Chair in 1983, 1984, 1989, 1992, and 1997, and as vice-chair in 1988, 1991, 1995, and 1996. During her tenure on the board, Bozman was a champion of Arlington's "smart growth" redevelopment policy, with a focus on building high-rises with mixed residential, office and retail spaces centered around the county's Metro stations. She was an advocate for fair housing, integrated social service programs, public transit, and public education; she also was responsible for the creation of the Arlington County Farmer's Market and a countywide block party called Neighborhood Day.

She was a supporter of local public arts projects, such as Dark Star Park in Rosslyn. An early advocate for the gay and lesbian community, she appointed the first openly gay member to a community advisory board. She also served on civic boards, including the Metropolitan Washington Council of Governments and the Washington Metropolitan Area Transit Authority.

When Bozman retired from the Arlington County Board in 1997, the Virginia General Assembly passed a resolution commending her for "one of the most distinguished public service careers in Arlington history". Bozman received the Elizabeth and David Scull Public Service Award from the Metropolitan Washington Council of Governments in 1983, and was honored with the Jefferson Cup by the Virginia Association of Counties in 1997. In 1986, she was named "Washingtonian of the Year" by Washingtonian magazine. In 1998, she received an honorary doctor of humane letters degree from Marymount University. Bozman remained active in county community affairs until her death in 2009; her activities included co-founding the Arlington Alliance for Housing Solutions, a nonprofit working to increase affordable housing in the county.

== Personal life ==
She was born Ellen McConnell in Springfield, Illinois. In 1946 she graduated Phi Beta Kappa from Northwestern University with a degree in political science. After receiving her bachelor's degree, she moved to the Washington, D.C. area for an internship with the National Institute of Public Affairs. She married William H. Bozman, and they had three children: William M. Bozman, Martha Bozman and Bruce H. Bozman. Ellen M. Bozman died at Virginia Hospital Center in Arlington on January 8, 2009, due to complications of breast cancer.

== Legacy ==
In 2009, the Arlington Alliance for Housing Solutions created the Ellen Bozman Affordable Housing Award, given to recognize the work of individuals or organizations to advance the availability and/or quality of affordable housing in the Arlington area.

In 2014, a park called Ellen's Trace was opened next to an affordable housing apartment building called The Jordan. The park runs from Wilson Boulevard to 9th Street North, and includes benches and garden plantings as well as markers commemorating Bozman's contributions to the community.

On November 18, 2017, The Arlington County Board voted unanimously to rename the County Office Building at 2100 Clarendon Boulevard for Bozman. "Ellen Bozman set the bar high for civic service and leadership," Arlington County Board Chair Jay Fisette said. "It is entirely fitting that the County offices be named for Ellen — a visionary who helped guide Arlington’s growth for decades, played a key role in developing Metro here, and who maintained the highest ethical standards throughout her decades of service to this community that she loved. Ellen believed in open, inclusive, competent government as a powerful agent of progress."
