= Frank Aydelotte =

American scholar (1880–1956)

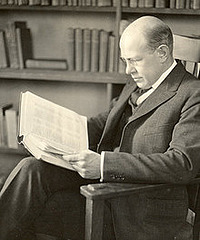

7th President of Swarthmore College
- In office 1921–1940
- Preceded by: Joseph Swain
- Succeeded by: John W. Nason

Personal details
- Born: October 16, 1880 Sullivan, Indiana, U.S.
- Died: December 17, 1956 (aged 76) Princeton, New Jersey, U.S.
- Education: Indiana University (BA); Harvard University (MA); Oxford University
- Profession: educator, administrator

Franklin Ridgeway Aydelotte (October 16, 1880 – December 17, 1956) was a U.S. educator. He became the first non-Quaker president of Swarthmore College and between 1921 and 1940 redefined the institution. He was active in the Rhodes Scholar program, helped evacuate intellectuals persecuted by the Nazis during the 1930s and served as director of the Institute for Advanced Study during World War II.

== Early and family life ==
Aydelotte was born in a small town in Sullivan County, Indiana, the son of William Ephraim Aydelotte and Matilda Brunger Aydelotte. His sister Nell was the first wife of John Andrew Rice. He attended Indiana University where he was an English major, a member of the Sigma Nu fraternity, earned a varsity letter in football, played in the exhibition football games at the 1904 Summer Olympics and graduated Phi Beta Kappa in 1911. In 1907 he married Marie Jeanette Osgood. Their only child was William Osgood Aydelotte.

== Career ==
After graduation, he became an English professor first at a teaching college in California, Pennsylvania, now called California University of Pennsylvania, then at Vincennes University and Louisville Male High School in Louisville, Kentucky. He became one of the first Rhodes Scholars and studied at Brasenose College, Oxford University. Aydelotte was the American Secretary to the Rhodes Trust from 1918 to 1952, overseeing the American program of the Rhodes Scholarship. He was elected to the American Philosophical Society in 1923.

=== President of Swarthmore College ===
By 1921, Aydelotte was president of Swarthmore College where he successfully blended the educational processes he learned at Oxford with the traditional Hicksite Quaker values the college was founded on. He expanded the college to an economically viable size and developed a broad-based liberal arts educational curriculum that stressed academic excellence.

He introduced the Honors program at Swarthmore, based on his experiences at Oxford. Based on the premise that the only true education is self-education, the system created seminar courses for selected students that were more challenging than the regular curriculum. These students would not receive grades or examinations, but took oral examinations at the end of the senior year given by external examiners. This replaced the lecture method of teaching for the advanced students, and introduced the notion of the students reaching the faculty. This method of teaching has become the signature of a Swarthmore College education.

=== Institute for Advanced Study ===
Upon retiring from Swarthmore in 1940, Aydelotte directed the Institute of Advanced Study in Princeton, New Jersey, during and immediately after World War II (1940-1947). He had served on the Board of Directors since 1930. Soon after his arrival, he engineered the relocation at Princeton of the Economic and Financial Organization of the League of Nations. During Aydelotte's time as the Institute's director, notable faculty included: Albert Einstein, Kurt Gödel, John von Neumann and James Waddell Alexander II.

Aydelotte was a member of the Anglo-American Committee of Inquiry that recommended Britain allow significantly more Jews to emigrate to Mandatory Palestine after World War II. In his diary, he wrote: “I left Washington pretty strongly anti-Zionist... But when you see at first hand what these Jews have done in Palestine... the greatest creative effort in the modern world. The Arabs are not equal to anything like it and would destroy all that the Jews have done... This we must not let them do.” However he also was clear in his opposition to the partition of Palestine and his support for equal rights for Arabs and Jews in Palestine.

== Publications ==
- Frank Aydelotte, Elizabethan Rogues and Vagabonds, Clarendon Press (1913)
- Frank Aydelotte, The Religion of Punch, The Nation, Volume 100, Issue # 2601, (May 6, 1915)
- Frank Aydelotte, The Oxford Stamp and Other Essays and Articles, Oxford University Press (1917)
- Frank Aydelotte, What the Americans Rhodes Scholar gets from Oxford, s.n (1920)
- Lawrence A. Crosby and Frank Aydelotte, Oxford of today: A manual for prospective Rhodes scholars, Oxford University Press (1922)
- Frank Aydelotte, Honors Courses in American Colleges and Universities, National Research Council of the National Academy of Sciences (1924)
- Frank Aydelotte, Honors Courses at Swarthmore, Columbia (1931)
- Frank Aydelotte, The Educational Program of Swarthmore College, The College (1933)
- Frank Aydelotte, Elizabethan Seamen in Mexico and Ports of the Spanish Main, The American Historical Review, Vol. 48, No. 1. (Oct., 1942), pp. 1–19. URL: JSTOR Stable
- Frank Aydelotte, Breaking the Adademic Lock Step, The Development of Honors Work in American Colleges and Universities, Harper & Brothers (1944)
- Frank Aydelotte, The American Rhodes Scholarships: A Review of the First Forty Years, Princeton University Press (1946)
- Frank Aydelotte, The Vision of Cecil Rhodes, A Review of the First Forty Years of the American Scholarships, Geoffrey Cumberlege (1946)

== Death and legacy ==
Aydelotte died in Princeton, New Jersey, on December 17, 1956, after several years of failing health. His papers are held by a library. His niece (who attended Swarthmore during his tenure), Mary A. R. Marshall became a leader opposing Massive Resistance and an influential delegate in the Virginia General Assembly.
