= Marie-Thérèse Lucidor Corbin =

French Creole activist (1749–1834)

Marie-Thérèse Lucidor Corbin (1749–1834) was an 18th-century French Creole activist. She celebrated the abolition of slavery in the French colonies by delivering a speech and singing a hymn to coloured citizens, set to the tune of La Marseillaise.

== Life ==
Corbin's father was Andre Lucidor, a former slave from Martinique working as a Master of Arms near Saint-Nicolas-des-Champs, Paris. In 1845 he married Thérèse-Charlotte Richard, a white Frenchwoman. She may herself have come from Martinique, though if so they would not have been able to marry there. Marie-Thérèse, baptized on 3 August 1749, was the couple's second daughter. She worked as a linen maid, and in 1786 married Jean-François Corbin, a wine merchant. However, after her husband left her in 1789 she and her older sister, Louise, lived in poverty in Paris. In 1791 the pair were excluded from the 'Fraternal Society of the Two Sexes' as "women capable of disturbing public order, trying to ring the alarm bell at Saint Roch church, and wanting to overturn statues in public places after the flight of Louis XVI". Louise attempted suicide and was later confined to Charenton asylum.

Marie-Thérèse was arrested in November 1792, and accused of involvement in the theft of the French crown jewels from the Garde Meuble. Claiming that the Interior Minister, Jean-Marie Roland de la Platière, and the Mayor of Paris, Jérôme Pétion de Villeneuve, had instructed her to try to find the thieves, she was released. In February 1793 she petitioned the National Convention to clear her name, arguing that her association with the thieves – while successful in bringing some of them to trial – had resulted in her losing her apartment and custody of her children.

After the Law of 4 February 1794 (16 pluviôse) abolished slavery in all the French colonies, Lucidor Corbin delivered an impassioned speech at the Temple of Reason at Notre-Dame:

O French people, the great day has arrived […] Liberty, Equality reign over our hemisphere […] our chains are broken forever […] O Marat, why are you not present […] and you, Ogée, free man of colors, our brother and friend, died first victim murdered by the aristocracy in our Isles […] we swear to defend Liberty, Equality and support the one and indivisible Republic.

She then sang a 'hymn of the coloured citizens' to the tune of La Marseillaise:

Free people come to this Temple throwing flowers on these heroes
They have freed their country from the shameful irons of slavery

In February 1795 she published a long text on national education in the French colonies. The text's close familiarity with Saint-Domingue suggests others like Julien Raimond or Léger-Félicité Sonthonax may have helped her write it. She continued to appeal for public assistance, presenting herself as a refugee to claim aid, and may have continued to work as a police informer.

Her daughter Marie-Constance entered the Conservatoire de Paris along with the future opera singer Alexandrine-Caroline Branchu, another mixed race student. However Marie-Constance did not achieve success as a singer, and died in 1808. Marie-Therese was admitted to the Hospice des Incurables on the Rue de Sèvres, where she died on 31 January 1834, aged 81.

== Works ==
- Discours de la citoyenne Lucidor F. Corbin, créole, républicaine, prononcée par elle-même au Temple de la Raison, l'an 2e de la liberté. Paris: Coutubrier, [1794].
- Hymne des citoyens de couleurs. 1794.
- Aperçu d’une Républicaine Française sur les colonies pour y établir des éducations nationales. Fait par la Citoyenne Lucidor femme Corbin, créolle. 1795.
