= Roberto Corbin =

Panamanian footballer (born 1953)

Personal information
- Date of birth: 19 April 1953 (age 73)
- Place of birth: El Chorrillo, Panama

Senior career*
Years	Team	Apps	(Gls)
1978–1979	Atletico Panama		
1979–1981	Etoile Espagnole		
1981–1984	Urania Genève		
1985–1989	Tauro		

International career
- Panama U20
- * Club domestic league appearances and goals

Roberto Corbin (born 19 April 1953) is a Panamanian former professional footballer who is known for being the first Panamanian player to play in Europe when he joined Swiss club Etoile Espagnole in 1979. In April 2019, however, Panamanian newspaper La Prensa reported another Panamanian footballer, Federico Ponce, had played in Spain at amateur level a year earlier.

Corbin worked for Panama's Ministry of Foreign Affairs.

== Club career ==
Corbin started his soccer career in Panama with Atletico Panama in 1978. In October 1979 he moved to Switzerland by recommendation of Peruvian coach Luis Bidú. After trialling with first-tier side CS Chênois for a week, he settled for Etoile Espagnole of the second-tier Swiss Challenge League where he stayed for two years. He joined Urania Genève of the Third Division where he played until 1984.

He returned to Panama in 1985 to play with Tauro in the opening championships of ANAPROF, where they were crowned on 1989.

== International career ==
Corbin played for the Panama U20 national team participating in a national under-20 championship where he became lead striker with 29 goals in 1971.
