= Myrtle Aydelotte =

American nurse and hospital administrator

Myrtle K. Aydelotte
- Born: Myrtle Elizabeth Kitchell; May 31, 1917; Van Meter, Iowa, US
- Died: January 7, 2010 (aged 92); New York City, US
- Occupation: CEO of the American Nurses Association

Myrtle Elizabeth Kitchell "Kitch" Aydelotte (May 31, 1917 – January 7, 2010) was an American nurse, professor and hospital administrator. She was CEO of the American Nurses Association, director of nursing for the University of Iowa Hospitals and Clinics and the first dean of the school's nursing program. She was the first female academic dean at Iowa. Aydelotte was named a Fellow of the American Academy of Nursing in 1976 and was designated a Living Legend by the same organization in 1994.

== Biography ==
Myrtle Kitchell Aydelotte was born on May 31, 1917, in Van Meter, Iowa. As a child, her family moved to Ada, Minnesota, and she graduated from high school there. Her nursing career began in 1939, when she graduated from the University of Minnesota School of Nursing. As a baccalaureate-educated new nurse, she was able to enter a hospital position as a head nurse for two years. During World War II, Aydelotte served in the Army Nurse Corps and was stationed in Italy and Africa. Upon returning from the war, she taught at the UMN School of Nursing while pursuing graduate study.

Aydelotte was the director and dean of nursing at the University of Iowa beginning in 1949; she completed a PhD from UMN School of Nursing in 1955. In 1956, Aydelotte stepped down as dean at Iowa but continued as professor while she raised her young children. During her tenure as dean, Iowa had transformed its nursing program from a three-year hospital-based program to a four-year academic program. She was the first female academic dean at Iowa. A few years later, Aydelotte took a research position at the Veterans Administration hospital in Iowa City while maintaining her position at the university. She became the nursing director of the university's hospitals and clinics in 1968. In 1973, she was elected a member of the Institute of Medicine. She retired from her academic and hospital positions in 1976. Aydelotte was CEO of the American Nurses Association from 1977 to 1981.

Aydelotte was honored as a Fellow of the American Academy of Nursing in 1976. She was honored as a Living Legend by the organization in 1994, the first year that the academy awarded that designation. She received the Sigma Theta Tau Hall of Fame Award in the same year. An endowed research professorship for doctoral students was established in Aydelotte's name at the University of Iowa in 1993.

Aydelotte was married to William O. Aydelotte, a University of Iowa professor and National Academy of Sciences member who twice chaired the school's history department, from 1956 to his death in 1996. She moved to Rochester, New York, after her retirement. She died there on January 7, 2010.

== Works ==
- Aydelotte, Myrtle K. (December 1987). "The Changing Image of the Nurse". Journal of Nursing Scholarship. 19 (4): 213–214. doi:10.1111/j.1547-5069.1987.tb00011.x. S2CID 72380068.
- Aydelotte, Myrtle (1988). "Myrtle Aydelotte". In Schorr, Thelma M.; Zimmerman, Anne (eds.). Making Choices, Taking Chances: Nurse Leaders Tell Their Stories. St. Louis, Missouri: The C. V. Mosby Company. ISBN 0801646111.

== See also ==
- List of Living Legends of the American Academy of Nursing
