= Rita Corbin =

American Catholic Worker and artist (1930–2011)

- Born: May 21, 1930; Indianapolis, US
- Died: November 17, 2011 (aged 81)
- Occupation: Graphic Artist
- Spouse: Martin Joseph Corbin
- Website: www.ritacorbinart.com

Rita Corbin (1930–2011) was a Catholic Worker and artist. Her prints have been used in religious publications, such as the newspaper The Catholic Worker and Commonweal, as well as in publications by peace organizations such as the War Resisters League. She is known for her painting on the wall of the Catholic Worker farm in Tivoli.

In 2011 Corbin died of injuries from an automobile accident.

== Illustrated Books ==
- Ramshaw, Gail (April 1995). A Metaphorical God: An Abecedary of Images for God. Illustrated by Rita Corbin. LiturgyTrainingPublications. ISBN 978-1-56854-071-9.
- Merton, Thomas (1976). Ishi means man. Unicorn Keepsake Series. Vol. 8. Foreward by Dorothy Day. Woodblock by Rita Corbin. Greensboro, N. C.: Unicorn Press. ISBN 0-87775-100-5.
- Bay, Christian; Walker, Charles C. (1975). Civil disobedience: theory and practice. Black Rose Books. Vol. E18. Cover illustration by Rita Corbin. Montreal: Black Rose Books. ISBN 978-0-919618-56-5. LCCN 76367205. OCLC 2525869. OL 5041247W.
- Bruchac, Joseph (1979). The Good Message of Handsome Lake. Unicorn keepsake series. Vol. 9. Woodblock illustration by Rita Corbin. Greensboro, N. C.: Unicorn Press. ISBN 978-0-87775-113-7. OCLC 5135306.
