= Jay Fisette =

American politician

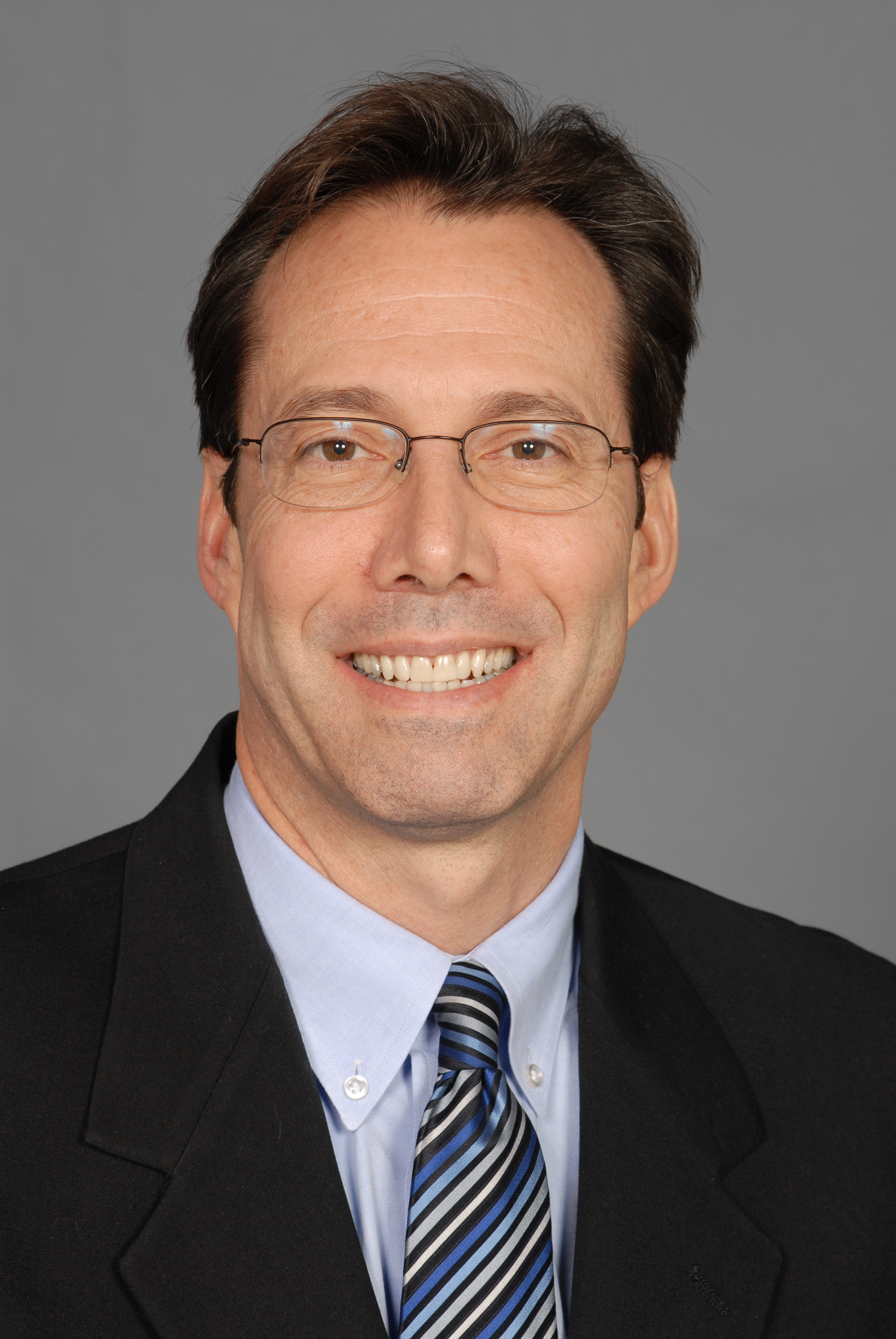

Chair of the Arlington County Board
- In office January 1998 – December 2017
- Preceded by: Ellen M. Bozman
- Succeeded by: Erik Gutshall

Personal details
- Born: Gerald N. Fisette, Jr. February 25, 1956 (age 70)
- Party: Democratic
- Spouse: Bob Rosen
- Education: Bucknell University; University of Pittsburgh
- Profession: Politician

Gerald N. "Jay" Fisette Jr. (born February 25, 1956) is an American politician in Arlington County, Virginia. He became the state's first openly gay elected official when he was elected to the five-person Arlington County Board in 1997. Fisette won four reelections and served as the County Board Chair in 2001, 2005, 2010, 2014 and 2017, his last year in office. He is a member of the Democratic Party. Fisette previously worked for the federal government and at a local nonprofit health center.

== Early life ==
Fisette received his Bachelor of Arts degree in Political Science from Bucknell University in 1978. Fisette said he chose that field of study because he "learned that government was a force for good, and public service was a noble profession." Following his graduation, he spent 18 months in San Francisco, a time where he accepted his identity as a gay man. According to Fisette, "It was here, in the recent aftermath of Harvey Milk's death that I started to recognize the importance of having openly gay men and lesbians in elected office." He then attended the University of Pittsburgh where he received his Master of Arts degree in Public and International Affairs in 1983.

== Career ==
After graduating Fisette moved to Arlington where he began work as an auditor for the General Accounting Office. From 1988-1989, he worked as a staff consultant for the Senate Labor and Human Resources Committee. During the late 1980s, he became involved with the Arlington Gay and Lesbian Alliance, a local LGBT rights organization. From 1990 to 1998, Fisette served as the director of the Whitman-Walker Clinic of Northern Virginia, a non-profit community health center that specialized in HIV/AIDS care.

In 1993, Fisette ran for a seat on Arlington County's Board after Democratic board member William T. Newman Jr. resigned to become a circuit court judge. In March of that year he defeated three other candidates in the Democratic primary, thanks to support from national gay rights groups, including the Gay & Lesbian Victory Fund, and Representative Barney Frank, a gay member of Congress. The following month Fisette lost to Benjamin Winslow, an independent candidate endorsed by Republicans, in the special election by 206 votes. Four years later in 1997 Fisette decided to run again after County Board chair Ellen M. Bozman chose not run for reelection. He ran as a "social progressive and fiscal conservative" who would "hold down taxes, attract new jobs and protect the suburb's diverse neighborhoods." He downplayed the importance of his sexual orientation by saying "I am clearly a proud gay man, but that's not all I am." He ultimately won the election that November, becoming the first openly gay elected official in Virginia. His win was applauded by national LGBT activists and he became one of a dozen gay and lesbian candidates who won elections throughout the country that November.

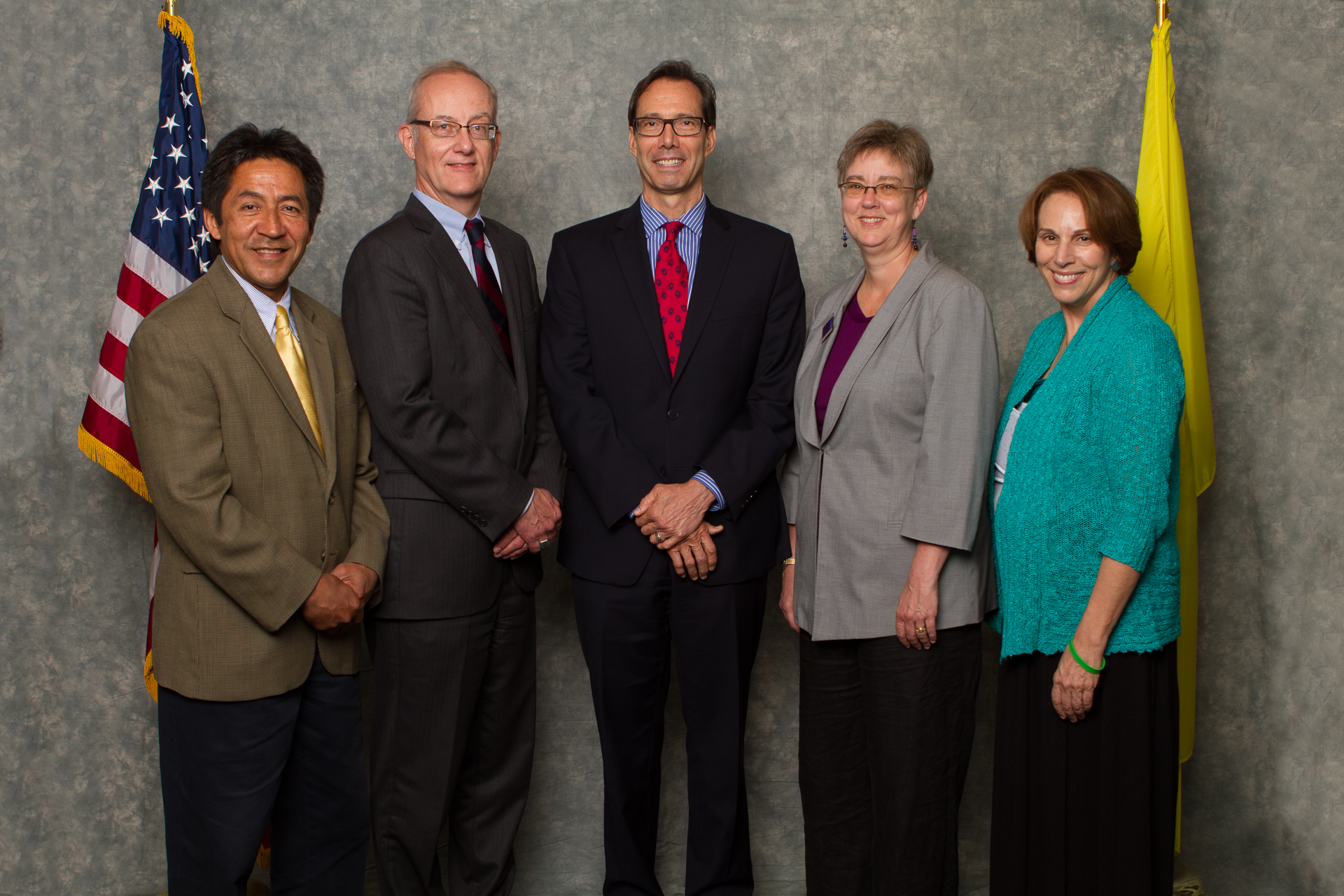
2014 Arlington County Board. From left to right: J. Walter Tejada, John Vihstadt, Jay Fisette, Mary Hynes and Libby Garvey.

In 2001, Fisette became chair of the County Board, his first of five terms in the rotating position. Under his leadership that year, the county's emergency response was praised following the September 11 attacks on The Pentagon. He won reelection that November, easily defeating Republican candidate Michael W. Clancy. In August 2003, Fisette announced he would challenge Representative Jim Moran for Virginia's 8th congressional district seat, saying he had experience in education, homeland security, and housing issues. Fisette withdrew from the race less than two weeks later. He ran unopposed for the County Board in 2005, and in 2009, easily defeated Green Party candidate John G. Reeder. Four years later, he defeated another Green Party candidate, Audrey R. Clement, in the 2013 election. When Moran announced his retirement from Congress in 2014, Fisette was one of the names mentioned as a possible replacement. He declined to run though, citing "the contrast between the dysfunctional climate on Capitol Hill and the can-do atmosphere in Arlington" as the main reason. Fisette declined to run for reelection in 2017 citing the desire for a career change and "embracing and advancing a set of progressive values that are so important to me, values we have championed here in Arlington that are threatened by the [Trump] administration." He is the second-longest-serving board member in the county's history.

During his tenure, Fisette cited environmental sustainability and a balanced budget as two of his main priorities. Environmental issues which he advocated for included addressing climate change, phasing-out plastic bags, and encouraging people to no longer buy single use plastic water bottles. He also played a large role in establishing the Capital Bikeshare program. He was named 2013's "Best Elected Official" by Arlington Magazine.

== Electoral history ==
Arlington County Board: Results 1993–2013
Year	Subject	Party	Votes	%	Opponent	Party	Votes	%	Opponent	Party	Votes	%
1993	Jay Fisette	Democratic	9.143	49.4	B.H. "Ben" Winslow, Jr.	Independent	9,349	50.6				
1997	Jay Fisette	Democratic	29,127	61.9	Amy M. Jones-Baskaran	Independent	17,906	38.0	Write-in		31	>0.1
2001	Jay Fisette	Democratic	30,214	60.8	Michael W. Clancy	Republican	19,293	38.9	Write-in		57	>0.1
2005	Jay Fisette	Democratic	43,978	97.4					Write-in		1,196	2.6
2009	Jay Fisette	Democratic	31,333	66.3	John G. Reeder	Green	14,970	31.7	Write-in		975	2.1
2013	Jay Fisette	Democratic	38,213	66.3	Audrey R. Clement	Green	17,916	31.1	Write-in		1,482	2.6

== Personal life ==
Fisette is married to Bob Rosen, author of The New York Times best seller Grounded and clinical psychologist who founded Healthy Companies International. They were married on their 30th anniversary on September 17, 2013, at All Souls Church, Unitarian in Washington, D.C. The couple chose to marry following the Internal Revenue Service's announcement that same-sex marriages performed in jurisdictions where it was legal would be recognized for federal tax purposes, no matter where the couple lived. After the wedding, Fisette stated: "The world is changing. If you would have asked us 15 years ago if we would ever have the opportunity to get married, we would have said, 'Not in our lifetime.'" Less than one year after their wedding same-sex marriage in Virginia was legalized. The couple have lived in Arlington's Ashton Heights neighborhood since 1987. In April 2011, their front yard was featured in a three-page article, titled "Front Yard Face-lift", in Southern Living magazine.

Fisette is a member of several organizations, including the Arlington Committee of 100, Arlington Gay and Lesbian Alliance, Ashton Heights Civic Association, Equality Virginia, Leadership Greater Washington, Unitarian Universalist Church of Arlington, and the Washington Area Bicyclist Association.
