= Jake Corbin =

American actor and model (1964–1992)

- Born: John Michael Avino; July 7, 1964; Pawtucket, Rhode Island, U.S.
- Died: September 27, 1992 (aged 28); Rhode Island, U.S.
- Occupations: Actor; Model; Dancer
- Years active: 1988–1992
- Agent: Falcon Studios

Jake Corbin (born John Michael Avino; July 7, 1964 – September 27, 1992) was an American adult film actor, dancer, and HIV/AIDS activist. He was a prominent figure in the New York City gay adult film scene during the late 1980s and early 1990s, known for his work with adult film directors such as Christopher Rage and his frequent appearances on public-access television. Corbin utilized his entertainment platform to support grassroots activism, working closely with the advocacy group ACT UP during the height of the AIDS crisis.

== Early life and military service ==
John was born in Pawtucket, Rhode Island, and raised in Providence. Following his graduation from high school, he enlisted in the United States Army. During his military service, he was subject to a disciplinary incident in which his pay was docked after he punched a sergeant.

Avino's transition into adult entertainment began while he was still enlisted in the military. After visiting a medical clinic, a nurse suggested that his physique and disposition made him well-suited to pursue dancing at a local nightclub. He subsequently secured his discharge from the military following an encounter with an Army colonel.

== Career ==
=== Adult film and stripping ===
In 1988, Avino relocated to New York City to pursue a career in entertainment. He adopted the stage name Jake Corbin, which he reportedly took from a movie credit. He found regular employment working as a stripper and escort in Manhattan gay venues, including The Works and The Break. As a dancer, he also toured various gay clubs across the United States.

Corbin's adult film career began in 1988 with a solo performance in the video While I Was Shooting Stars, directed by Christopher Rage. He became a frequent guest on public-access television's The Robin Byrd Show, where he gained popularity for his "street tough" New England accent and candid, humorous commentary regarding the adult entertainment industry. Throughout the late 1980s and early 1990s, Corbin performed for major adult studios, including Falcon Studios and Catalina Video.

=== Activism ===
Corbin was a dedicated member of ACT UP/New York (AIDS Coalition to Unleash Power) during a period of intense public demonstrations demanding medical research, healthcare access, and government action regarding the AIDS epidemic. He regularly leveraged his public profile within the adult industry to support AIDS awareness and fundraising efforts, frequently performing as a dancer at community AIDS benefits.

Corbin actively participated in several major political demonstrations organized by the group. These included protests at the New York State Capitol in Albany, New York City Hall, and the historic December 1989 "Stop the Church" demonstration at St. Patrick's Cathedral He also traveled to demonstrate at the V International Conference on AIDS in Montreal, Quebec, Canada, and participated in actions in South Carolina.

== Death ==
He got diagnosis with HIV/AIDS, Corbin's health began to decline. After suffering a severe bout of pneumonia, he moved back to Rhode Island in January 1992 to be cared for by his family. He died of AIDS-related complications on September 27, 1992, at the age of 28.

== Filmography ==
=== Film ===
| Year | Title | Role | Notes |
|---|---|---|---|
| 1988 | While I Was Shooting Stars | Jake | Debut |
| 1988 | Screen Test 2 | Boy | Catalina Video |
| 1988 | Cruisin' 1: Men on the Make | Beautiful Teenager | Falcon Studios |
| 1988 | Boys on Fire | Slick | HIS Video |
| 1989 | Runaways | Troy | Catalina Video |
| 1989 | Men of the Tropics | Leo | Satellite Video |
| 1989 | Dreaming About Dick | Danny | Cinderfella |
| 1989 | Undercover | Marco | |
| 1989 | Three Little Pigs | Hans | |
| 1989 | The Night Boys | Billy | Cinderfella |
| 1989 | Frank Vickers 3: Man after Man | Edward | |
| 1989 | In His Corner | Jake | |
| 1990 | Mystic Museum | John | |
| 1990 | The Men of 550 | Jake | Spur Productions |
| 1990 | Queer: The Movie | Jake | |
| 1990 | Secret Asian Man | Tom | True Blue Productions |
| 1990 | Full Service | Johnny | Catalina Video |
| 1991 | Scum | Alex | |
| 1991 | Best of Frank Vickers | Chris | Live Video Inc. |
| 1991 | Pacific Fever | Irwin | True Blue Productions |
| 1997 | Hammer It Home | Jake Corbin | Posthumous release |
| 1997 | Incredible Sex Parties | Jake Corbin | Posthumous release |
| 1997 | Awesome Gay Orgies | Jake Corbin | Posthumous release |
| 2014 | Crazy for Raw Cock, Falcon Bareback 21 | Jake Corbin | Posthumous release |

== Notes ==
- Douglas, Jerry (1993). Manshots Vol. 5 No. 5 (Fade Out: Jake Corbin Obituary). FirstHand, Ltd. OCLC 20695029.
