= Serge Corbin =

Serge Corbin is a Canadian professional marathon canoe racer and a native of St. Boniface, Quebec.

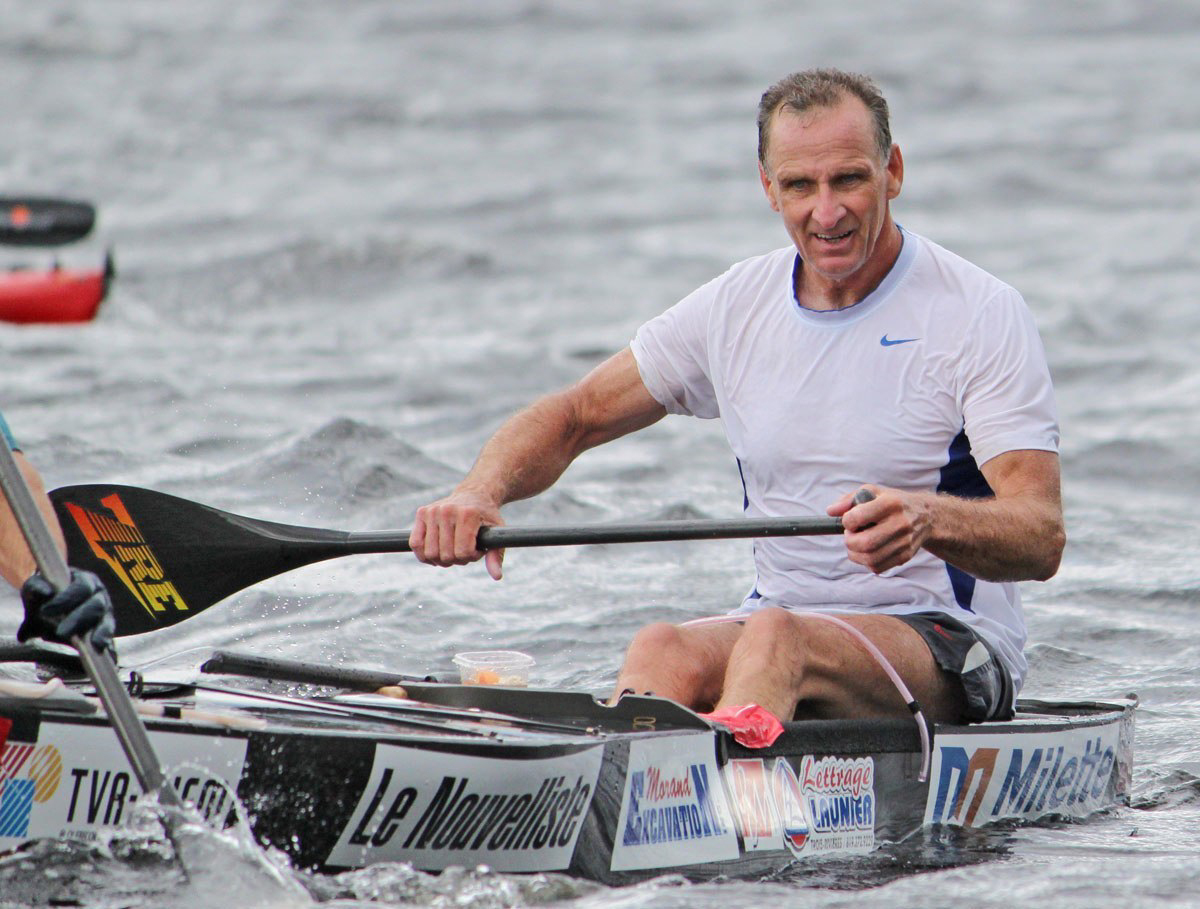
Serge Corbin

Serge Corbin at the finish of the 2005 AuSable River Canoe Marathon

== Accomplishments ==
Corbin began his canoe racing career at the age of 16. His first partner was his older brother and hero, Claude Corbin. The elder Corbin was already an accomplished paddler and the two went on to form one of the most successful partnerships in the history of canoeing. Subsequent to Claude's retirement, Serge has shared success with more than ten partners.

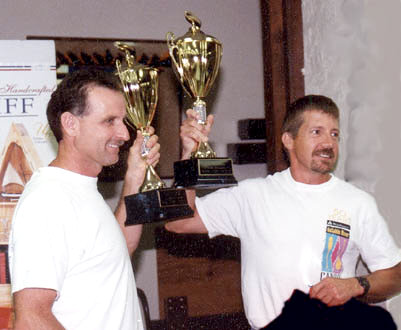
Champions of the 2001 Triple Crown Canoe Racing, their second Triple Crown Championship in a row, Serge Corbin (L), 44, of St-Boniface de Shawinigan, Quebec, and Jeff Kolka, 42, of Grayling, Michigan

Corbin has essentially owned the sport of marathon canoe racing in North America by dominating its Triple Crown races from his rookie season, when he was 16, until well into his late 40s. The Triple Crown of Canoe Racing consists of North America's three most prestigious marathon canoe races: the General Clinton Canoe Regatta (70 miles over one day from Cooperstown, NY to Bainbridge, NY); The Au Sable River Canoe Marathon (120 miles non-stop overnight from Grayling, MI to Oscoda, MI); and, la Classique Internationale de Canots de la Mauricie, a three-day, three stage race from La-Tuque, QC to Trois-Rivieres, QC.

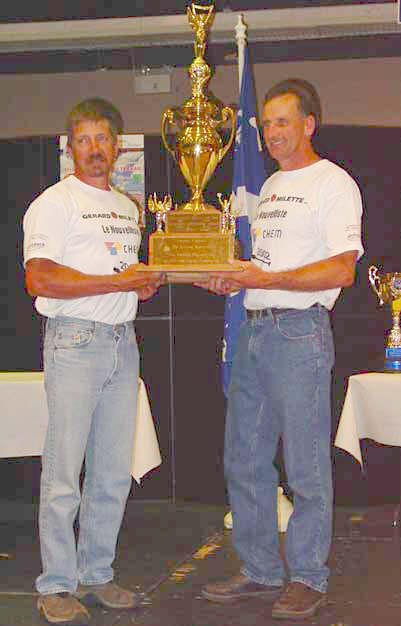
Champions of the 2002 Triple Crown Canoe Racing, their third Triple Crown Championship in a row, [left] Jeff Kolka, 43, of Grayling, Michigan, and Serge Corbin, 45, of St-Boniface de Shawinigan, Quebec

In the AuSable River Canoe Marathon, Serge Corbin holds the record for most individual victories, at 18. For 27 years he held the course record, at 13:58:08, set in 1994 with his partner Solomon Carriere, of Cumberland House, Saskatchewan. In 2021, Jorden Wakeley and Matt Meersman, set the new course record at 13:54:09.

Corbin has won La Classique on 25 different occasions with 10 different partners. In 2004 Serge was honored with a 4-hour tribute commemorating his 25 victories in Quebec's grueling marathon.

He has been most dominant in the General Clinton, where he entered the 70 mile marathon 29 times and won the race 28 times. Corbin has only lost one 70 mile canoe race between the banks of upstate New York's often shallow Susquehanna River.

Corbin has ventured outside of flatwater marathon canoe racing to participate in outrigger ocean canoe racing and swanboat racing. He was on winning teams in the prestigious Molokai Hoe race in 1985 and 1989. He has also competed in international swanboat competitions.

Corbin is listed as one of the "Paddlers of the Century" by Paddling Magazine.
