= Yukon 1000 =

1000-mile canoe race down the Yukon River

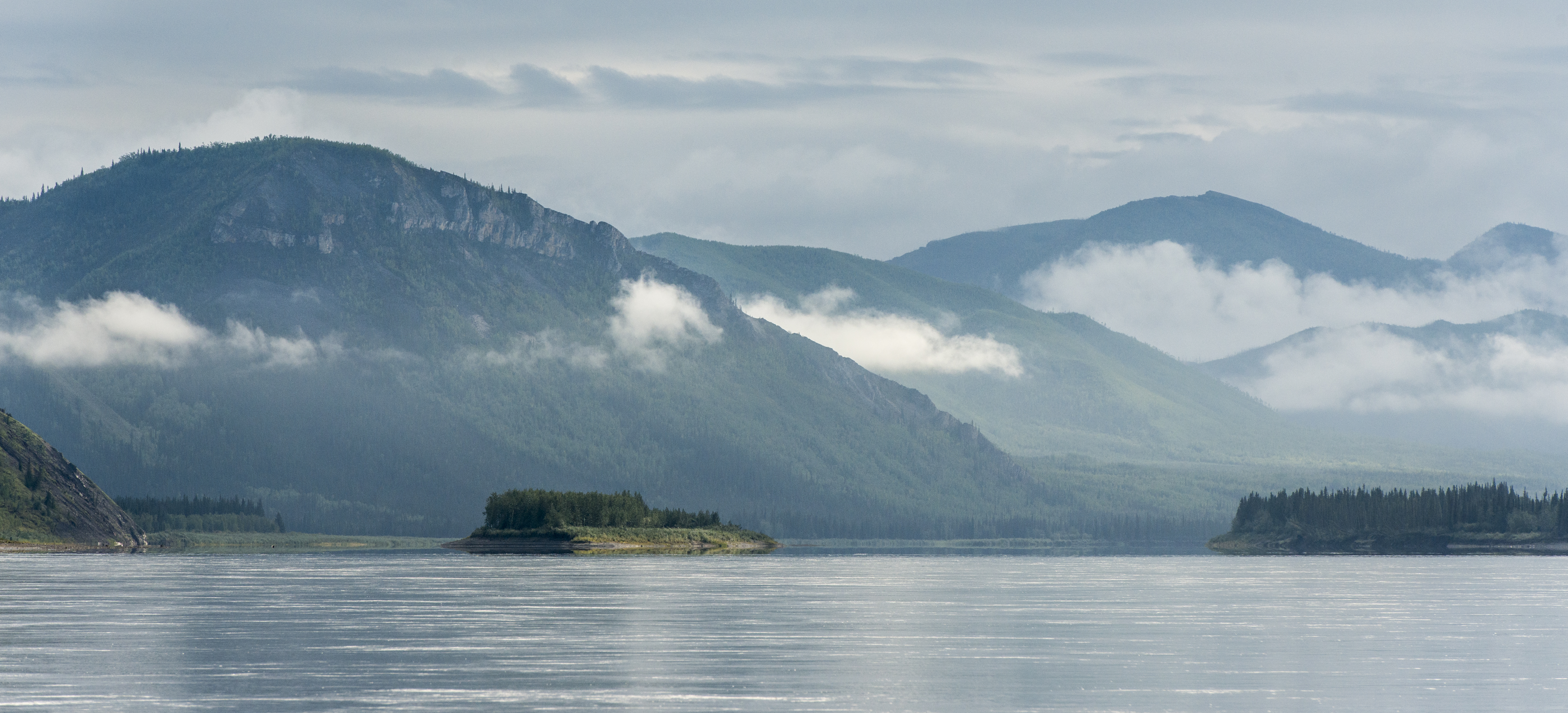
- Yukon River approximately 700 miles into the Yukon 1000

Event information
- Type: Canoe, kayak, and stand-up paddleboarding
- Race area: Yukon, Canada & Alaska, USA
- Distance: 946 miles
- Website: https://www.yukon1000.org/

The Yukon 1000 is the world's longest canoe and kayak race. It is an unsupported race down the Yukon River through subarctic and arctic wilderness.

== Route ==
The race is about 1,000 miles down the Yukon River, making it the world's longest canoe race. The route is remote, sparsely populated, and has long stretches without access. Past Dawson City, around 450 miles into the race, competitors are beyond helicopter range and rescues are estimated to take 24-72 hours.

The first half of the race follows one route of the 19th century Klondike Gold Rush from Whitehorse and to Dawson City, with the second half of the race continuing North until crossing the Arctic Circle, and ending at the bridge where the Dalton Highway crosses the river. Competitors must navigate Lake Laberge, the Five Finger Rapids, and the Yukon Flats.

The route includes sections within the Yukon–Charley Rivers National Preserve and the Yukon Flats National Wildlife Refuge.

== History ==
The Yukon 1000 has been conducted in its present form since 2009. Typically, about 30 teams are allowed to compete each year.

In 2022, over 3,500 teams applied to compete. Only 40 were deemed fit and sufficiently experienced for the race and only 24 competed. In 2025, over 5,500 teams applied to compete.

Best Ever Times
Canoe	Kayak	Standup Paddleboard
6 days, 5 hours, 19 minutes	5 days, 11 hours, 48 minutes	7 days, 6 hours, 34 minutes
Jaakko Soivio & Heikki Hihnala	Daniel Staudigel & Jason Magness	Bradley Friesen & Scott Baste
Finland	United States	United States
2014	2022	2022

In 2024, two New Zealanders won the race, with the second best recorded times in the race's history.

In 2025 two Kiwi kayakers Gordon Townsend from Ohope and Bob McLachlan from Wanaka again won the event, with a time of five days, 14 hours and 46 minutes; the second best time for the race (three hours slower than the fastest time set by an American team in 2022 when the Yukon River was in flood. Teams have to self-sufficient and take a six hour break every night to camp, cook, filter water, sleep and carry out repairs (a few hours after the start a rudder cable snapped). So they had only three to four hours sleep a night.

== Rules ==
The race must be completed in under 10 days. Racers compete in teams of two and are tracked by GPS with SPOT devices. Racers are required to rest for at least six hours every day, leaving 18 hours for paddling. The race comprises three divisions: canoeing, kayaking, and stand-up paddleboarding.

The race is entirely unsupported. Competitors find places to camp along the route, prepare their own food, and purify their own water. Competitors are not allowed to communicate with the outside world.
