= James F. Almand =

American politician (1948–2026)

Jim Almand

Member of the Virginia House of Delegates
- In office January 11, 1978 – January 14, 2004
- Preceded by: John L. Melnick
- Succeeded by: Al Eisenberg
- Constituency: 22nd district (1978‍–‍1983); 47th district (1983‍–‍2004)

Personal details
- Born: James Frederick Almand; October 18, 1948 Arlington, Virginia, U.S.
- Died: May 14, 2026 (aged 77)
- Party: Democratic
- Spouse: Cindy
- Children: 3
- Education: College of William & Mary

James Frederick Almand (October 18, 1948 – May 14, 2026) was an American attorney, judge and a Democratic politician who represented Arlington, Virginia. He served in the Virginia House of Delegates from 1978 to mid-2003, rising to become chair of the powerful House Courts of Justice committee that effectively determines which judicial candidates will become judges and justices in Virginia’s court system. He then served as a Circuit Court judge in the 17th judicial circuit, which comprises Arlington and the City of Falls Church. He retired in December, 2011.

Almand received undergraduate and law degrees from the College of William and Mary.

Almand died on May 14, 2026, at the age of 77.
