= 4008 Corbin =

Main-belt asteroid

Discovery
- Discovered by: Felix Aguilar Obs.
- Discovery site: Leoncito
- Discovery date: 22 January 1977

Designations
- Named after: Brenda & Thomas Corbin (American astronomer)
- Alternative designations: 1977 BY · 1988 CN
- Minor planet category: main-belt · Phocaea

Orbital characteristics
- Epoch 4 September 2017 (JD 2458000.5)
- Uncertainty parameter 0
- Observation arc: 40.37 yr (14,744 days)
- Aphelion: 2.8548 AU
- Perihelion: 1.8637 AU
- Semi-major axis: 2.3593 AU
- Eccentricity: 0.2100
- Orbital period (sidereal): 3.62 yr (1,324 days)
- Mean anomaly: 67.752°
- Mean motion: 0° 16^{m} 19.2^{s} / day
- Inclination: 25.514°
- Longitude of ascending node: 167.21°
- Argument of perihelion: 327.38°

Physical characteristics
- Dimensions: 5.424±0.060; 6.011±0.054 km 6.35 km (calculated)
- Synodic rotation period: 6.203±0.001 h (Note: Pravec (2010) web: rotation period 6.203±0.001 hours with a brightness amplitude of 0.12 magnitude. The Collaborative Asteroid Lightcurve Link assigns a quality code of U=3 to the period solution, which denotes a secure result within the precision given and no ambiguity. Summary figures for (4008) Corbin at Collaborative Asteroid Lightcurve Link (CALL) and Ondrejov Asteroid Photometry Project)
- Geometric albedo: 0.23 (assumed); 0.264±0.068; 0.2836±0.0635
- Spectral type: S
- Absolute magnitude (H): 13.1 · 13.2 · 13.32±0.32

4008 Corbin, provisional designation 1977 BY, is a stony Phocaea asteroid from the inner regions of the asteroid belt, approximately 6 kilometers in diameter. It was discovered on 22 January 1977, by staff members of the Felix Aguilar Observatory's (formerly known as both, Yale-Columbia Southern Station, and Carlos U. Cesco Station, EACUC) at the Leoncito Astronomical Complex in Argentina.

== Orbit and classification ==
Corbin is a member of the Phocaea family (701), a group of asteroids with similar orbital characteristics. It orbits the Sun in the inner main-belt at a distance of 1.9–2.9 AU once every 3 years and 7 months (1,324 days). Its orbit has an eccentricity of 0.21 and an inclination of 26° with respect to the ecliptic.

== Physical characteristics ==
Corbin has been characterized as a common stony S-type asteroid by PanSTARRS' photometric survey.

A photometric lightcurve analysis by Czech astronomer Petr Pravec at Ondřejov Observatory in 2010 rendered a well-defined rotation period of 6.203±0.001 hours with a brightness amplitude of 0.12 in magnitude (U=3).

According to the survey carried out by the NEOWISE mission of NASA's Wide-field Infrared Survey Explorer, the asteroid has an albedo of 0.26 and 0.28 and a diameter of 5.4 and 6.0 kilometers, respectively, while the Collaborative Asteroid Lightcurve Link (CALL) assumes a somewhat lower albedo of 0.23 and calculates a correspondingly larger diameter of 6.4 kilometers.

== Naming ==
This minor planet was named after American couple Brenda and Thomas Corbin. He was an astronomer at USNO, in charge of the Argentinian EACUC station, and involved in a number of astrometric projects, such as the Astrographic Catalogue Reference Stars. His wife Brenda, who also worked at the EACUC station, is prolific astronomical librarian, known for her work with the Special Libraries Association and in IAU's Working Group on Nomenclature. The official naming citation was published by the Minor Planet Center on 11 February 1998 (M.P.C. 31295).
