= Lynchburg, South Carolina =

- Town
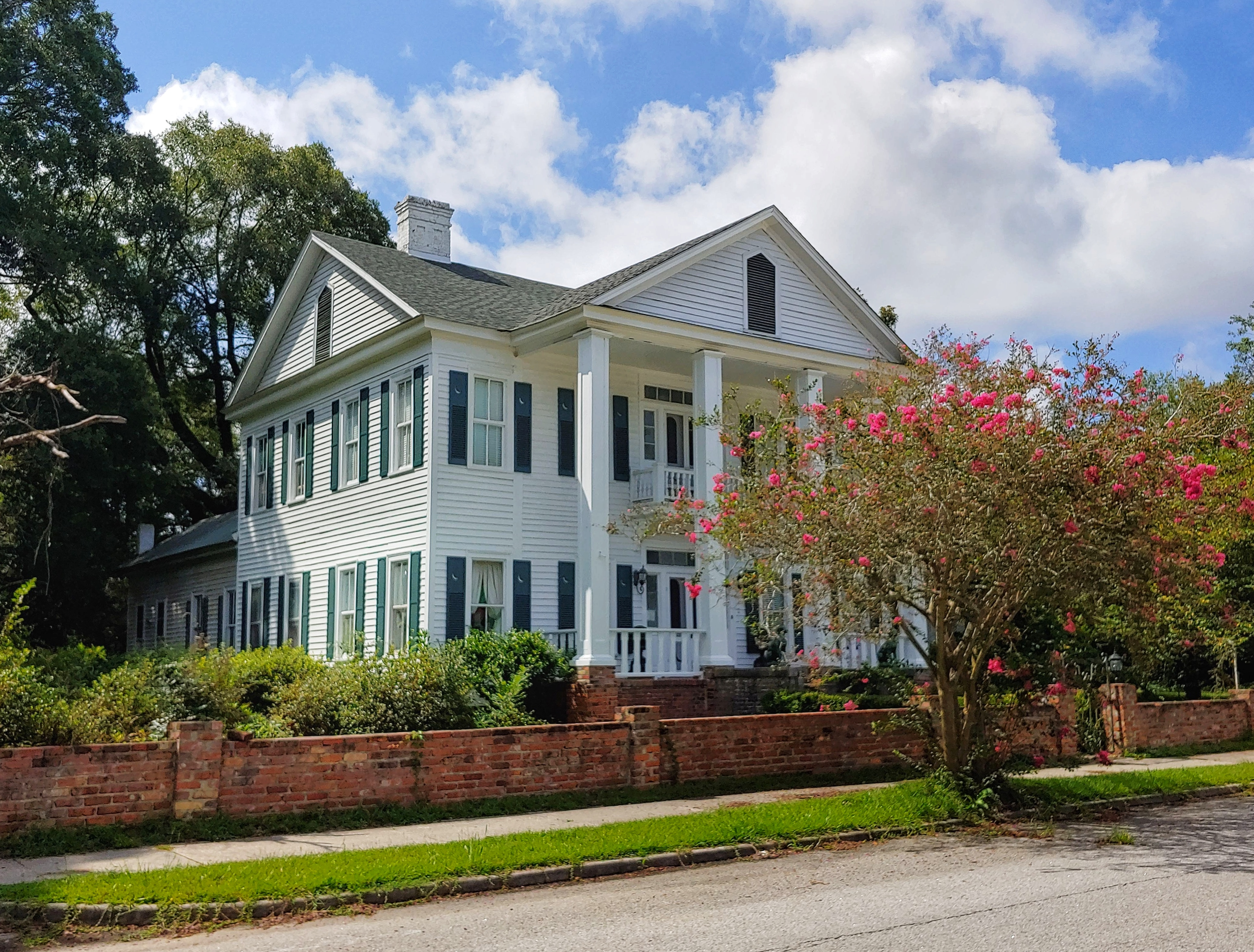
- Historic home in Lynchburg

- Location in Lee County and the state of South Carolina.
- Coordinates: 34°03′36″N 80°04′37″W
- Country: United States
- State: South Carolina
- County: Lee

Area
  - Total: 1.13 sq mi (2.93 km^{2})
  - Land: 1.13 sq mi (2.93 km^{2})
  - Water: 0 sq mi (0.00 km^{2})
- Elevation: 154 ft (47 m)

Population (2020)
  - Total: 318
  - Density: 281/sq mi (108.5/km^{2})
- Time zone: UTC-5 (Eastern (EST))
  - Summer (DST): UTC-4 (EDT)
- ZIP code: 29080
- Area codes: 803, 839
- FIPS code: 45-43360
- GNIS feature ID: 2406064

Lynchburg is a town in southeastern Lee County, South Carolina, United States. As of the 2020 census, Lynchburg had a population of 318.

== History ==
Lynchburg Presbyterian Church and Tanglewood Plantation are listed on the National Register of Historic Places.

== Geography ==
According to the United States Census Bureau, the town has a total area of 1.1 square miles (2.8 km^{2}), all land.

== Demographics ==
Historical population
| Census | Pop. | Note | %± |
|---|---|---|---|
| 1910 | 466 | | — |
| 1920 | 506 | | 8.6% |
| 1930 | 512 | | 1.2% |
| 1940 | 382 | | −25.4% |
| 1950 | 506 | | 32.5% |
| 1960 | 544 | | 7.5% |
| 1970 | 546 | | 0.4% |
| 1980 | 534 | | −2.2% |
| 1990 | 475 | | −11.0% |
| 2000 | 588 | | 23.8% |
| 2010 | 373 | | −36.6% |
| 2020 | 318 | | −14.7% |
U.S. Decennial Census

=== 2020 census ===
Lynchburg town, South Carolina – Racial and ethnic composition Note: the US Census treats Hispanic/Latino as an ethnic category. This table excludes Latinos from the racial categories and assigns them to a separate category. Hispanics/Latinos may be of any race.
| Race / Ethnicity (NH = Non-Hispanic) | Pop 2000 | Pop 2010 | Pop 2020 | % 2000 | % 2010 | % 2020 |
|---|---|---|---|---|---|---|
| White alone (NH) | 101 | 52 | 42 | 17.18% | 13.94% | 13.21% |
| Black or African American alone (NH) | 433 | 313 | 263 | 73.64% | 83.91% | 82.70% |
| Native American or Alaska Native alone (NH) | 0 | 0 | 0 | 0.00% | 0.00% | 0.00% |
| Asian alone (NH) | 0 | 0 | 2 | 0.00% | 0.00% | 0.63% |
| Native Hawaiian or Pacific Islander alone (NH) | 0 | 0 | 0 | 0.00% | 0.00% | 0.00% |
| Other race alone (NH) | 0 | 0 | 0 | 0.00% | 0.00% | 0.00% |
| Mixed race or Multiracial (NH) | 3 | 0 | 8 | 0.51% | 0.00% | 2.52% |
| Hispanic or Latino (any race) | 51 | 8 | 3 | 8.67% | 2.14% | 0.94% |
| Total | 588 | 373 | 318 | 100.00% | 100.00% | 100.00% |

=== 2000 census ===
As of the census of 2000, there were 588 people, 222 households, and 138 families residing in the town. The population density was 519.7 inhabitants per square mile (200.7/km^{2}). There were 262 housing units at an average density of 231.5 per square mile (89.4/km^{2}). The racial makeup of the town was 73.64% African American, 17.35% White, 8.50% from other races, and 0.51% from two or more races. Hispanic or Latino of any race were 8.67% of the population.

There were 222 households, out of which 29.7% had children under the age of 18 living with them, 32.4% were married couples living together, 27.0% had a female householder with no husband present, and 37.4% were non-families. 32.9% of all households were made up of individuals, and 14.4% had someone living alone who was 65 years of age or older. The average household size was 2.65 and the average family size was 3.29.

In the town, the population was spread out, with 26.0% under the age of 18, 14.3% from 18 to 24, 26.5% from 25 to 44, 19.4% from 45 to 64, and 13.8% who were 65 years of age or older. The median age was 33 years. For every 100 females, there were 94.7 males. For every 100 females age 18 and over, there were 87.5 males.

The median income for a household in the town was $19,250, and the median income for a family was $33,750. Males had a median income of $22,125 versus $19,318 for females. The per capita income for the town was $14,608. About 31.1% of the population were below the poverty line, including 34.2% of those under age 18 and 44.2% of those age 65 or over.
