= Brenda Corbin =

American astronomy librarian

Brenda G. Corbin (née Brenda Joyce Groves, born 1942) is a retired American astronomy librarian who worked for many years as the librarian of the James M. Gillis Library in the United States Naval Observatory, and who is known for founding the Library and Information Services in Astronomy (LISA) conference series. She was honored in 2020 by being named a Legacy Fellow of the American Astronomical Society.

== Education and career ==
Corbin majored in English at the Woman's College of Georgia, graduating in 1964. She began working as a librarian in 1965, at the Folger Shakespeare Library in Washington, DC, and she remained there until 1969. Her interest in astronomy began in the late 1960s when her husband, astronomer Thomas E. Corbin, was posted at the Leoncito Astronomical Complex in Argentina. Returning to Washington, she began working in the National Library of Medicine while working towards a master's degree in library science at the University of Maryland, College Park, which she completed in 1972.

She became the librarian of the United States Naval Observatory in 1973. Under her leadership, the observatory's James M. Gillis Library held a collection of 90,000 titles, including rare copies of original works by Nicolaus Copernicus, Galileo Galilei, and Johannes Kepler. She retired in 2005.

== Research community leadership ==
Corbin first proposed the Library and Information Services in Astronomy (LISA) conference series in 1982, and the first conference was held in 1988, after a year of organizational work by Corbin.

Corbin chaired the Working Group on Libraries of the International Astronomical Union (later renamed as the Working Group on Informational Professionals) from 1990 to 1995. She has been called "one of the founding mothers" of the working group, and "instrumental in shaping its work".

== Recognition ==
In 1991, the Special Libraries Association gave Corbin their Physics–Astronomy–Mathematics (PAM) Division Award, "for her work on the International Astronomical Union conference, Library and Information Services in Astronomy (LISA)". In 2002, the association gave her the PAM Achievement Award. She was named a Legacy Fellow of the American Astronomical Society in 2020.

Asteroid 4008 Corbin, discovered in 1977 at the Leoncito Astronomical Complex, was named in honor of Corbin and her husband.
