= Henry O. Lampe =

American politician (1927–2012)

Henry Oscar Lampe

Member of the Virginia House of Delegates from Arlington
- In office January 1970 – January 1972 Serving with George Mason Green Jr., Allen H. Harrison, Jr.
- Preceded by: William Lightsey
- Succeeded by: John L. Melnick

Personal details
- Born: April 8, 1927 Bremen, Germany
- Died: October 28, 2012 (aged 85) Arlington, Virginia, U.S.
- Party: Republican
- Spouse(s): Virginia H. Lampe; Margaret Sanger Lampe
- Children: 2 step-daughters
- Education: Westtown School
- Alma mater: American University

Military service
- Allegiance: United States
- Branch/service: United States Navy
- Years of service: 1943-1946
- Battles/wars: World War II

Henry Oscar "Hank" Lampe (April 8, 1927 – October 28, 2012) was an American government official, stockbroker, civic activist and Republican politician who represented Arlington, Virginia, in the Virginia General Assembly for two years.

== Early and family life ==
Born on April 8, 1927, in Bremen, Germany, to American diplomat Dorothea Caroline Gatjeshipper and her husband Henry Dietrich Lampe, whose business career involved shipping cargo, young Hank was an American citizen by birth but only moved stateside to Arlington, Virginia, with his family as World War II began, and Germany and the United States exchanged diplomats and their families.

Hank had attended school in Germany and was soon sent to the Westtown School, a boarding school in Westtown Township, Pennsylvania, because his mother was transferred from a United States State Department post in Washington, D.C. to Tegucigalpa, Honduras. As the Allies began winning the war, she was assigned to London, England, and Hank as an adult noted that he "had the pleasure of" being bombed by both the British in Germany and the Germans in London. As hostilities ended, his mother Dorothea Lampe became the first civilian American woman to enter Berlin, Germany, about a month after hostilities ended.

Meanwhile, Henry Lampe was drafted in 1945 and joined the United States Navy. Rather than resume his studies at a crowded university after his discharge in December 1946, he joined his mother in Berlin by February, and used his bilingual fluency with the Office of Military Government in Berlin, working in the investigations division of the Public Safety section as the Cold War began.

Returning to the United States in 1950, Hank Lampe began his studies at American University in Washington, D.C. The following year, his mother returned transferred stateside and he graduated with a bachelor's degree in commerce. Through the G.I. Bill, the U.S. Navy also paid for Lampe to study for a year at Swarthmore College in Pennsylvania.

In July 1953, Lampe married fellow American University graduate Virginia (Ginny) Harvey of Brookville, Maryland. As described below, he supported her civic (and Republican political) activism, but they had no children before she died of cancer (age 56) on December 14, 1984. Several years later, Lampe married widow Margaret Marston Sanger, who had been active in the Democratic party (and on the State Board of Education), and helped raise her three children.

== Career ==
After graduating from college, Lampe took a job with the U.S. Information Agency, and moved into an apartment in Arlington's Fairlington neighborhood in 1953. Two years later, his mother was scheduled to become vice-consul in Austria, but never left the U.S.A., instead dying of a stroke in Arlington, so Henry and his wife Ginny Lampe moved into her house. In 1955, Lampe took a job with the Bureau of the Budget, and the family soon moved to a house of Greencastle Street in north Arlington, where they would live for more than three decades until Ginny's death.

In 1959, as the Eisenhower administration was ending, Lampe resigned his government job because he would otherwise need to wait three or four years for a promotion. He accepted a position with a local stock-brokerage firm, Birely & Company, and began his private sector career. Although he initially worked across the Potomac River in Washington, D.C., he soon opened the firm's Arlington Office, and then joined another firm that became part of Thomson McKinnon Securities, in Arlington's Clarendon neighborhood. In 1990, Thomson McKinnon went bankrupt and its assets were acquired by Prudential Securities, which in turn was acquired by Wachovia Securities in 2003 (after Lampe'e retirement).

Lampe began his civic activism in discussions concerning lighting at Greenbrier playground and the neighboring Yorktown High School's athletic fields. He then became involved with the local civic association (the Northwest Arlington Civic Association), and matters involving construction of Route 66 through Arlington. Meanwhile, his wife (and her father C. Willard Harvey), kept taking him to Maryland Republican functions (her grandfather had been the first Republican elected to the Montgomery County, Maryland board in modern times).

During the 1960 presidential election, Lampe made contact with the local Virginia Republican party, came to know Joel Broyhill, who represented Arlington and Alexandria in the U.S. House of Representatives, and sat on the Republican State Central Committee (1964–1968). While Lampe's Republican friend Jack Corber ran against incumbent Democrat Charles Fenwick for the Virginia State Senate and lost badly, another Republican friend, Hal Castro, managed to get elected to the Arlington County Board in 1963. Castro became the first Republican to win election to that local body in modern times, and won re-election once, with Ginny Lampe as his campaign manager. Castro nominated Hank Lampe to serve on the local transportation commission (which turned out to basically regulate taxis) and then the Northern Virginia Regional Planning Commission. Republicans Ned Thomas and Lee Phillips also won election to the Arlington county board, and the party slated Hank Lampe to run for one of Arlington's three positions in the Virginia House of Delegates. Later, Ginny Lampe helped run the Arlington board campaign of Dr. Ken Haggarty. Meanwhile, both Lampes were active in the campaigns to elect Linwood Holton governor, with Ginny becoming the gubernatorial campaign's co-chair.

Hank Lampe won election to the Virginia House of Delegates in the Republican landslide of 1969, when all three Democratic members of Arlington's delegation to the Virginia General Assembly lost their seats to Republicans. He became the first European born member of the Virginia legislature. Although the Republicans had increased to perhaps 24 members from their previous 6 to 8 legislative seats, they were still a minority party in Virginia's legislature. Two years later Arlington's Democrats reorganized, and Lampe lost his re-election bid, coming in 5th among the seven candidates for the three part-time delegate positions. Lampe only ran for office once more, and lost his bid for election to the Arlington County Board in 1973 to Ellen M. Bozman (who would be re-elected a record six times to that board, as well as serve as its chairman).

Meanwhile, his wife Ginny became president of the Virginia Federation of Republican Women from 1976-1980, and served as a delegate to the Republican National Convention in 1976, as well as on the Republican State Central Committee. Although she never ran for office in her own right, Ginny Lampe became the first female chairman of the 10th District Committee (and the first woman from either party to chair a congressional district committee). Despite recurring physical health problems with asthma, Ginny Lampe also became heavily involved in many mental health organizations (including serving on their boards). She also became the national executive administrator of volunteers for Richard M. Nixon's presidential campaign and (in the year of her death) administrator of Northern Virginia Woman for Reagan and vice-chairman of the John Warner for U.S. Senate Committee.

Hank Lampe remained involved in many local civic activities, although he had feared continuing legislative involvement would severely impede his commission-based income. He and his wives also consulted with citizens of various persuasions on a nonpartisan basis, and he in particular encouraged businessmen to become active in civic life. Lampe served as Vice Chair of the Virginia Metropolitan Area Transportation Study Commission, a member of the Arlington Commission on Aging and later delegate to the White House Conference on Aging, a member of Arlington's Committee of 100, and as Chair and President of the Northern Virginia Mental Health Association (his wife Ginny also served on that board and on the Northern Virginia Mental Retardation Council). He also served on the Board of Trustees of Arlington Hospital and with Dr. Kenneth Haggerty helped turn around its finances despite competition with HCA (which bought Arlington's Doctors Hospital in 1983). Lampe became the hospital board's president during his charter-limited nine years of service, and later endowed a nursing scholarship in his wife Ginny's memory. He also continued involvement with Arlington's Chamber of Commerce and became its president in 1990, and was later inducted into the Arlington Business Hall of Fame. Lampe also served on the Board of Visitors for George Mason University (where he worked with attorney and developer John T. Hazel including on development of the Arlington campus).

== Death and legacy ==
Lampe died at Arlington Hospital (now Virginia Hospital Center) on October 28, 2012. He was survived by his second wife Margaret Marston Lampe, two step-daughters (Peggy Van Cleave and Nancy Wykoff) and nine step-grandchildren. Although Ginny's memorial service had been held at Faith Lutheran Church (in which she had also been active), St. Mary's Episcopal Church hosted Hank's memorial service. Lampe participated in an oral history archived at the Arlington Public Library, and donated his papers to George Mason University, which makes them available through its library's special collections office. Arlington also nominated Virginia Lampe for an entry in the Dictionary of Virginia Biography. Margaret Marston Lampe donated her papers from before their marriage to Virginia Tech, on whose Board of Visitors she had served beginning in 1988 and before moving to Florida.

Virginia House of Delegates
Preceded by William Lightsey	Representing Arlington County; 1970–1972	Succeeded by John L. Melnick
