= William O. Aydelotte =

American historian (1910–1996)

- Born: September 1, 1910; Bloomington, Indiana, U.S.
- Died: January 17, 1996 (aged 85)
- Spouse: Myrtle Elizabeth Kitchell (m. 1956)

Academic work
- Main interests: British Parliament
- Notable works: The History of Parliamentary Behavior (1977)

William Osgood Aydelotte (September 1, 1910 – January 17, 1996) was an American historian focused on the British Parliament, a pioneer in applying the statistics to historical research.

Aydelotte was one of the first historians elected to the National Academy of Sciences. The New York Times called him "an authority on British history". The National Academies Press called him "A leading figure in the development of social science history in the United States". Aydelotte served as the chairman of the University of Iowa history department.

== Early life and education ==
Aydelotte was born in Bloomington, Indiana, the only child of Marie Jeanette Osgood and Franklin Ridgeway Aydelotte. He graduated from Harvard College in 1931, and a received doctoral degree from Cambridge University in 1934.

== Career ==
Aydelotte was the chairman of the University of Iowa history department from 1947 to 1959 and from 1965 to 1968. He retired in 1978. He was married to Myrtle Aydelotte, former nursing school dean at Iowa, from 1956 until his death.

== Notable works ==
- Bismarck and British Colonial Policy: The Problem of South West Africa, 1883-1885 (University of Pennsylvania Press, 1937; 2d edition, Russell & Russell, 1970)
- The History of Parliamentary Behavior (Princeton University Press, 1977.)
- Quantification in History (Addison-Wesley, 1971)
