= Commonweal (magazine) =

Liberal American Catholic journal of opinion

- Editor: Dominic Preziosi
- Frequency: 11 issues a year
- Circulation: 20,000
- First issue: 1924
- Company: Commonweal Foundation
- Country: United States
- Based in: New York City
- Language: English
- Website: commonwealmagazine.org
- ISSN: 0010-3330

Commonweal is a liberal (Note: Though see Sandbrook (2007) and Clancy & Green (1987) for a more refined comparison of Commonweal with the American liberal tradition.) Catholic journal of opinion, edited and managed by lay people, headquartered in New York City. It is the oldest independent Catholic journal of opinion in the United States.

== History ==
Founded in 1924 by Michael Williams (1877–1950) and the Calvert Associates, Commonweal is the oldest independent Roman Catholic journal of opinion in the United States. The magazine was originally modeled on The New Republic and The Nation but “expressive of the Catholic note” in covering literature, the arts, religion, society, and politics.

One of the magazine's most famous contributors is Dorothy Day, who began writing for it in 1929. In 1932, she met Peter Maurin, who had visited the offices of Commonweal to spread his ideas of a more radical practice and theory of the works of mercy; the editor of the magazine turned him away but suggested he contact Day. Together, they founded the Catholic Worker Movement. Day continued to contribute to Commonweal for several decades.

Among its other notable contributors, Commonweal has also published Hannah Arendt, Hilaire Belloc, Georges Bernanos, G. K. Chesterton, Ross Douthat, Terry Eagleton, Graham Greene, Elizabeth Johnson, Alasdair MacIntyre, Thomas Merton, Michael Novak, Marilynne Robinson, and Charles Taylor. It has printed the short fiction of Whittaker Chambers, Alice McDermott, J. F. Powers, Valerie Sayers, and Evelyn Waugh; the poetry of W. H. Auden, John Berryman, Robert Lowell, Theodore Roethke, and John Updike; and the artwork of Jean Charlot, Rita Corbin, Fritz Eichenberg, and Emil Antonucci.

== Overview ==
The name "commonweal" is a more archaic version of "commonwealth," meaning "the public good." Founding editor Michael Williams chose that name for the magazine because it suggested the magazine's social outlook. William Morris's earlier newspaper of the same name may have influenced the decision, as well. The magazine was originally titled The Commonweal, until it dropped the definite article in 1965.

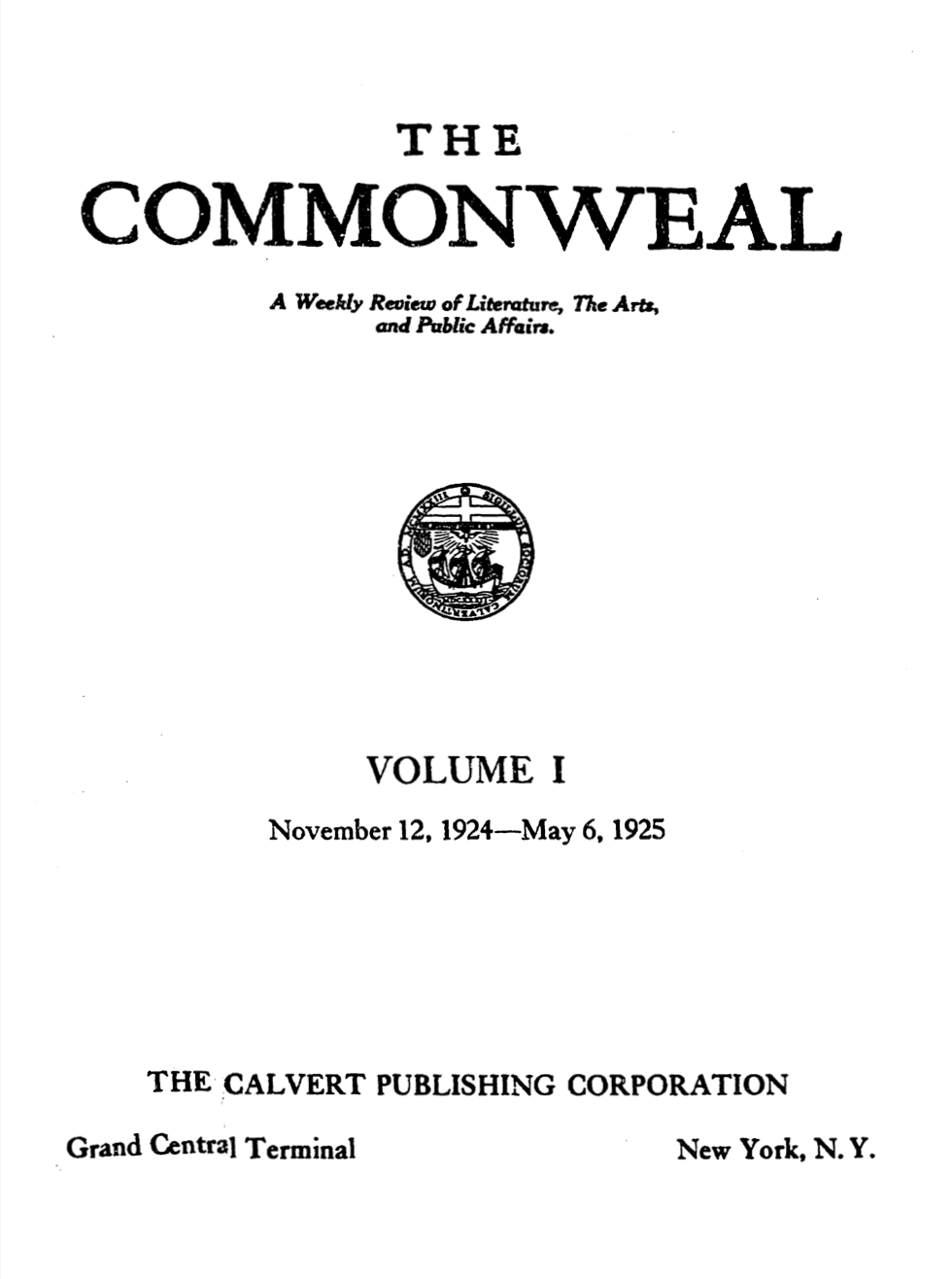
The front cover of the first edition of The Commonweal

From its inception, the organization has aimed to engage people through more than its print magazine. The group of mainly lay people who became its first board called themselves "the Calvert Associates" and wanted to spread "Calvert ideals," after the Baron of Baltimore, a proponent of religious liberty (in his case, for Catholics in the English colonies). Today, Commonweal continues to organize community discussion groups "for civil, reasoned debate on the interaction of faith with contemporary politics and culture."

Commonweal publishes editorials, columns, essays, and poetry, along with film, book, and theater reviews. Eleven issues of Commonweal are released each year, with a circulation of approximately 20,000.

Since 2018, the magazine has hosted a weekly or biweekly podcast, whose episodes usually supplement the magazine with interviews on subjects that recently appeared there.

The journal is run as a not-for-profit enterprise and managed by a board of directors.

== Viewpoint ==
Commonweal frequently publishes writers from various political and theological perspectives, but tends toward a liberal slant. This orientation has evolved over time.

In the first issue, the editors claimed their lay independence from the Catholic hierarchy and their freedom to publish dissenting voices, while also declaring, "As a sure background The Commonweal will have the continuous, unbroken tradition and teachings of the historic Mother Church." Reviewing the magazine's first two issues, the New York Times called it a "propagandist" for the Church, but one which used "[s]uavity, not ferocity," to defend its ideas. Its ideas have often run counter to other Catholic publications, however, as when it criticized Franco in the 1930s.

After it had gained notoriety, "Commonweal Catholic" became a (sometimes pejorative) term for readers of the magazine, indicating their interest in reformist ideas in church and society. Today, the magazine's stated mission emphasizes progressive politics.

== See also ==
- America
- Catholic Worker
- National Catholic Register
- National Catholic Reporter
