= Joseph Louis Corbin =

French general (1792–1859)

- Born: 2 February 1797; Rennes, Ille-et-Vilaine, France
- Died: 1859 (aged 61–62)
- Occupation: Soldier
- Known for: Siege of Constantine

Joseph Louis Corbin (2 February 1797 – November 1859) was a French general who took command of the successful attack that closed the Siege of Constantine in 1837. He also served in the 1849 expedition to Rome, and helped restore calm in Paris after the coup of 2 December 1851.

== Early years ==
Joseph-Louis Corbin was born in Rennes, Ille-et-Vilaine, on 2 February 1792, son of a naval lieutenant. His father continued to serve in the navy under the French First Republic and the First French Empire. He died of wounds received during the Battle of Bautzen. Joseph-Louis Corbin studied at the Lycée Napoleon. He graduated in 1810 at the age of seventeen and joined the imperial guard. With little money or connections he had little chance of advancement in the cavalry, so he left and joined the infantry. On 20 June 1813 he was named sub-lieutenant in the 132nd line infantry.

== North Africa ==
Corbin advanced through the ranks and on 18 May 1833 was promoted to colonel of the 17th regiment of light infantry. He spent six years in North Africa engaged in constant campaigns against the Arabs. At the Siege of Constantine in 1837 he commanded one of the assault columns. Since two other colonels had died in the combat, Marshall Sylvain Charles Valée gave Corbin command of the troops that stormed the breach and took the city after an hour and a half of combat. For his success it was proposed to promote him to the rank of brigadier, but this was refused on the grounds that he was too young. He was awarded the cross of Commander of the Legion of Honour.

== Later career ==
Corbin was named brigadier general on 22 November 1839. He commanded a brigade during the expedition to Rome in 1849. He assisted in suppressing the insurrection that followed the French coup d'état of 2 December 1851. On 22 December he was promoted to commander of the Limoges Division. He was placed in the reserve in 1857. He was made a Grand Officer of the Legion of Honour on 28 January 1857. He died in November 1859, aged 62.

== Sources ==
- "CORBIN, Joseph Louis". Leonore.
- Sarrut, Germain; Bourg, Edme Thédore (1840). Biographie Des Hommes Du Jour: (Mit vielen Porträts). Krabbe. p. 294.
- Vapereau, Gustave (1861). "CORBIN (Joseph-Louis)". Dictionnaire universel des contemporains: contenant toutes les personnes notables de la France et des pays étrangers, avec leurs noms, prénoms, surnoms et pseudonymes ... L. Hachette.
