= National Register of Historic Places listings in Buckingham County, Virginia =

Location of Buckingham County in Virginia

This is a list of the National Register of Historic Places listings in Buckingham County, Virginia.

This is intended to be a complete list of the properties and districts on the National Register of Historic Places in Buckingham County, Virginia, United States. The locations of National Register properties and districts for which the latitude and longitude coordinates are included below, may be seen in an online map.

There are 12 properties and districts listed on the National Register in the county.

This National Park Service list is complete through NPS recent listings posted March 6, 2026.

== Current listings ==
| | Name on the Register | Image | Date listed | Location | City or town | Description |
|---|---|---|---|---|---|---|
| 1 | Alexander Hill Baptist Church | Alexander Hill Baptist Church | November 7, 2017 (#100001495) | 1171 Jerusalem Church Rd. 37°39′21″N 78°36′50″W | Buckingham | |
| 2 | Bryn Arvon and Gwyn Arvon | Bryn Arvon and Gwyn Arvon | January 3, 1991 (#90002111) | Arvon Rd. 37°41′27″N 78°21′03″W | Arvonia | |
| 3 | Buckingham Courthouse Historic District | Buckingham Courthouse Historic District | November 12, 1969 (#69000225) | Both sides of U.S. Route 60; 37°33′03″N 78°33′21″W | Buckingham | |
| 4 | Buckingham Female Collegiate Institute Historic District | Buckingham Female Collegiate Institute Historic District | October 4, 1984 (#84000035) | Gravel Hill Rd. 37°35′00″N 78°22′20″W | Gravel Hill | |
| 5 | Buckingham Training School | Buckingham Training School | February 13, 2015 (#15000013) | 245 Camden St. 37°32′13″N 78°27′46″W | Dillwyn | |
| 6 | Chellowe | Chellowe | August 5, 1999 (#99000961) | Chellowe Rd. 37°29′07″N 78°24′52″W | Sprouses Corner | |
| 7 | Peter Francisco House | Peter Francisco House | March 16, 1972 (#72001386) | Southeast of Dillwyn, 0.9 miles (1.4 km) south of Locust Grove Rd. 37°28′47″N 78°22′04″W | Dillwyn | |
| 8 | Guerrant House | Guerrant House | December 7, 2000 (#00001497) | Bridgeport Rd. 37°43′45″N 78°23′29″W | Arvonia | |
| 9 | Perry Hill | Perry Hill | October 30, 1980 (#80004176) | State Route 56; 37°33′49″N 78°37′57″W | Saint Joy | |
| 10 | Seven Islands Archeological and Historic District | Seven Islands Archeological and Historic District | July 3, 1991 (#91000832) | Address Restricted | Arvonia | Extends into Fluvanna County |
| 11 | Stanton Family Cemetery | Stanton Family Cemetery | April 29, 1993 (#93000350) | Eastern side of Brooks Hall Rd., 0.4 miles (0.64 km) north of its junction with Ridge Rd. 37°39′22″N 78°23′42″W | Diana Mills | |
| 12 | Woodside | Woodside | November 16, 1993 (#93000040) | Northern side of Mohawk Rd., 0.5 miles (0.80 km) southwest of its junction with U.S. Route 60; 37°32′55″N 78°33′01″W | Buckingham | |

== See also ==
- List of National Historic Landmarks in Virginia
- National Register of Historic Places listings in Virginia
