= Union Hill =

Union Hill may refer to:

Communities

- Union Hill, Alabama
- Union Hill, California
- Union Hill, Illinois
- Union Hill, Minnesota
- Union Hill, Hudson County, New Jersey, a former town that is now part of Union City
- Union Hill, Morris County, New Jersey
- Union Hill, New York- a hamlet in Monroe County, New York
- Union Hill, Surry County, North Carolina
- Union Hill, Henderson County, Texas
- Union Hill, Buckingham County, Virginia
- Union Hill, Richmond, Virginia
- Union Hill-Novelty Hill, Washington

Schools

- Union Hill High School, Union City, New Jersey
- Union Hill School District, Grass Valley, California
- Union Hill Independent School District, Upshur County, Texas
