= Perry Hill =

Perry Hill may refer to

- Perry Hill (baseball) (born 1952), American professional baseball coach
- Perry Hill (Saint Joy, Virginia), an historic home near Saint Joy, Virginia, United States
- Perry Vale, or Perry Hill, a neighbourhood, electoral ward and road in the London Borough of Lewisham, United Kingdom
  - Perry Hill (ward), a former electoral ward of Lewisham London Borough Council that existed from 1978 to 2002
  - Perry Hill Stadium, a former greyhound racing venue in Perry Vale, London, United Kingdom

== See also ==
- Perivale, an area in the London Borough of Ealing, United Kingdom.
- Perry Hall (disambiguation)
