= Eldridge Mill, Virginia =

Unincorporated community in Virginia, United States

Coordinates: 37°36′36″N 78°27′39″W

Eldridge Mill is an unincorporated community in Buckingham County, in the U.S. state of Virginia.
