= Areanum, Virginia =

Unincorporated community in Virginia, US

Coordinates: 37°26′52″N 78°30′35″W

Areanum is an unincorporated community in Buckingham County, in the U.S. state of Virginia.
