= Enonville, Virginia =

Unincorporated community in Virginia, United States

Coordinates: 37°30′00″N 78°31′24″W

Enonville is an unincorporated community in Buckingham County, in the U.S. state of Virginia.
