= Gilliamsville, Virginia =

Unincorporated community in Virginia, United States

Coordinates: 37°40′04″N 78°15′36″W

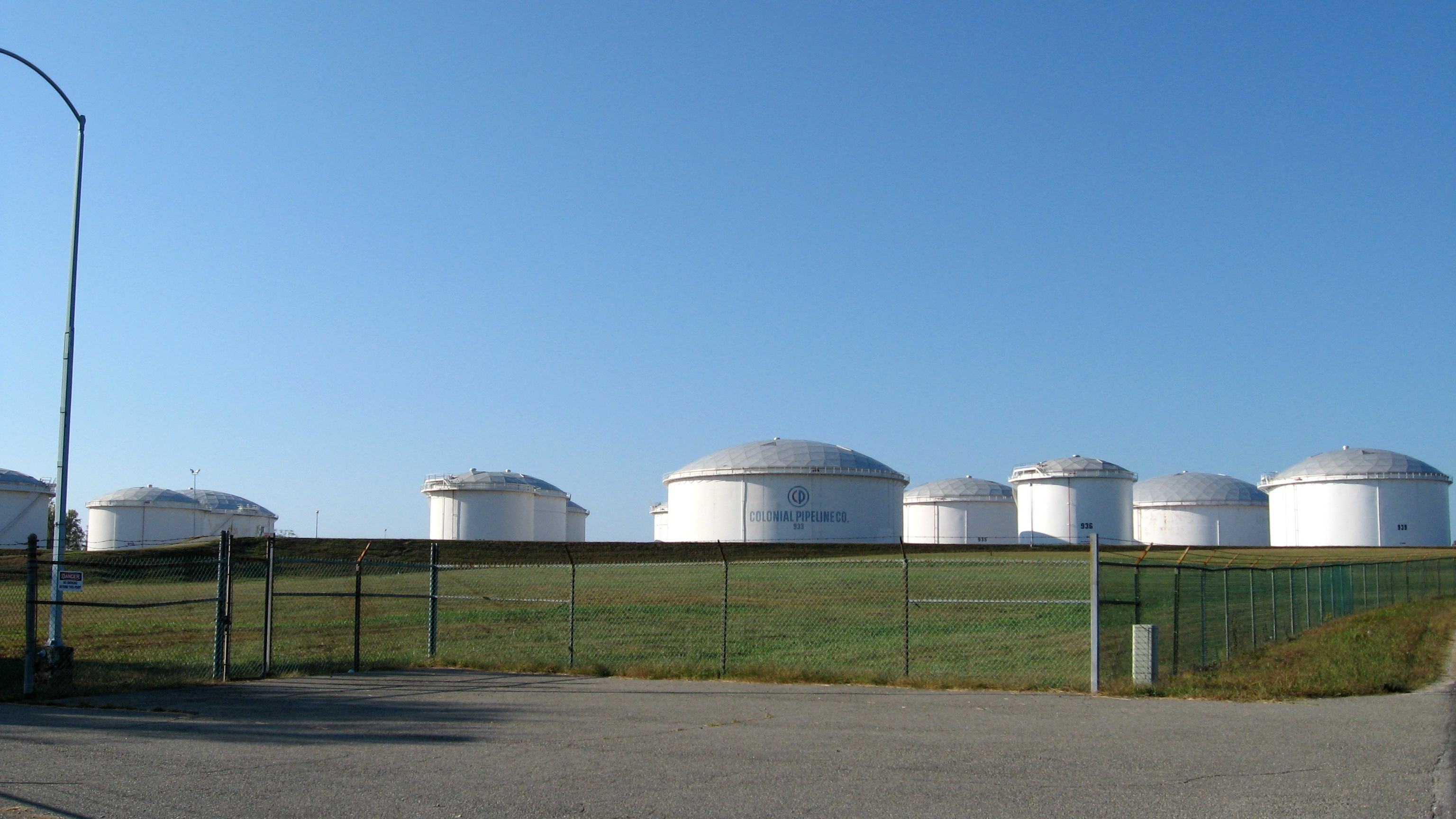
Tank farm outside Gilliamsville

Gilliamsville is an unincorporated community in Buckingham County, in the U.S. state of Virginia.
