= Guerrant House =

Guerrant House may refer to:

- Guerrant House (Arvonia, Virginia), NRHP-listed
- Guerrant House (Pilot, Virginia), listed on the NRHP in Montgomery County, Virginia
