= Locust Grove (Dillwyn, Virginia) =

Historic house in Virginia, United States

- Peter Francisco House
- U.S. National Register of Historic Places
- Virginia Landmarks Register
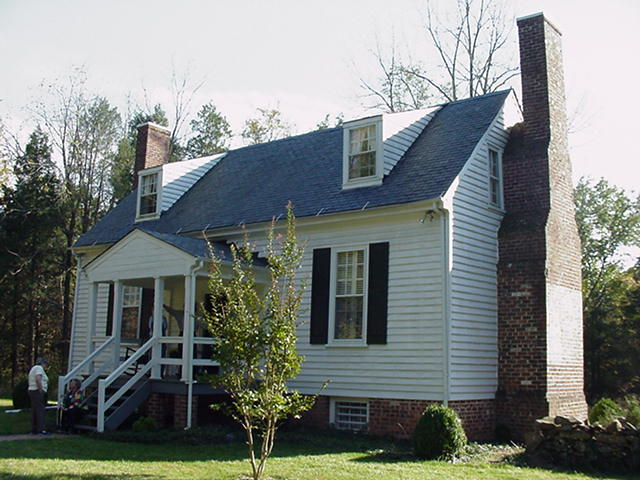
- Front of the house

- Location within Virginia Location within the United States
- Location: SE of Dillwyn, 0.9 mi. S of SR 626, near Dillwyn, Virginia
- Coordinates: 37°29′2″N 78°22′9″W
- Architectural style: Central-passage house
- NRHP reference No.: 72001386
- VLR No.: 014-0097

Significant dates
- Added to NRHP: March 16, 1972
- Designated VLR: January 18, 1972

Locust Grove is a historic house located between Dillwyn and Cumberland, Virginia, constructed before 1794. It is remembered for its connection to the Revolutionary soldier Peter Francisco, and as the Peter Francisco House it was added to the National Register of Historic Places on March 16, 1972.

== Description ==
Locust Grove is a 1 1/2-story single-pile house; it is covered by a gable roof, with two shed dormers on each slope. A box cornice forms a base for the roof. There are two chimneys on the building's exterior, one on either end. The eastern of the two is of Flemish bond, and is original; the western, of American bond, appears to be a replacement dating to the time when a one-story wing was added onto the house. This wing is now gone, but the foundation of its chimney remains; a small garden has been platted on the site. The foundation of the structure is of English bond, and there is a full basement. At the time of the house's National Register nomination, most of the original window frames, complete with their original sills, remained, as did a good deal of beaded siding. The house's woodwork is of heart pine, and it is joined with wooden pegs and nails.

Inside, the house was divided into two principal rooms per floor, with a central hallway for the stairs. Few original fittings survive; the mantels and wainscoting were removed, as were some floorboards from the second floor. Part of the first-level floor had fallen in. Portions of the stairway survived, as did the north-exterior door. The walls were once plastered, but much of the covering has disintegrated over time.

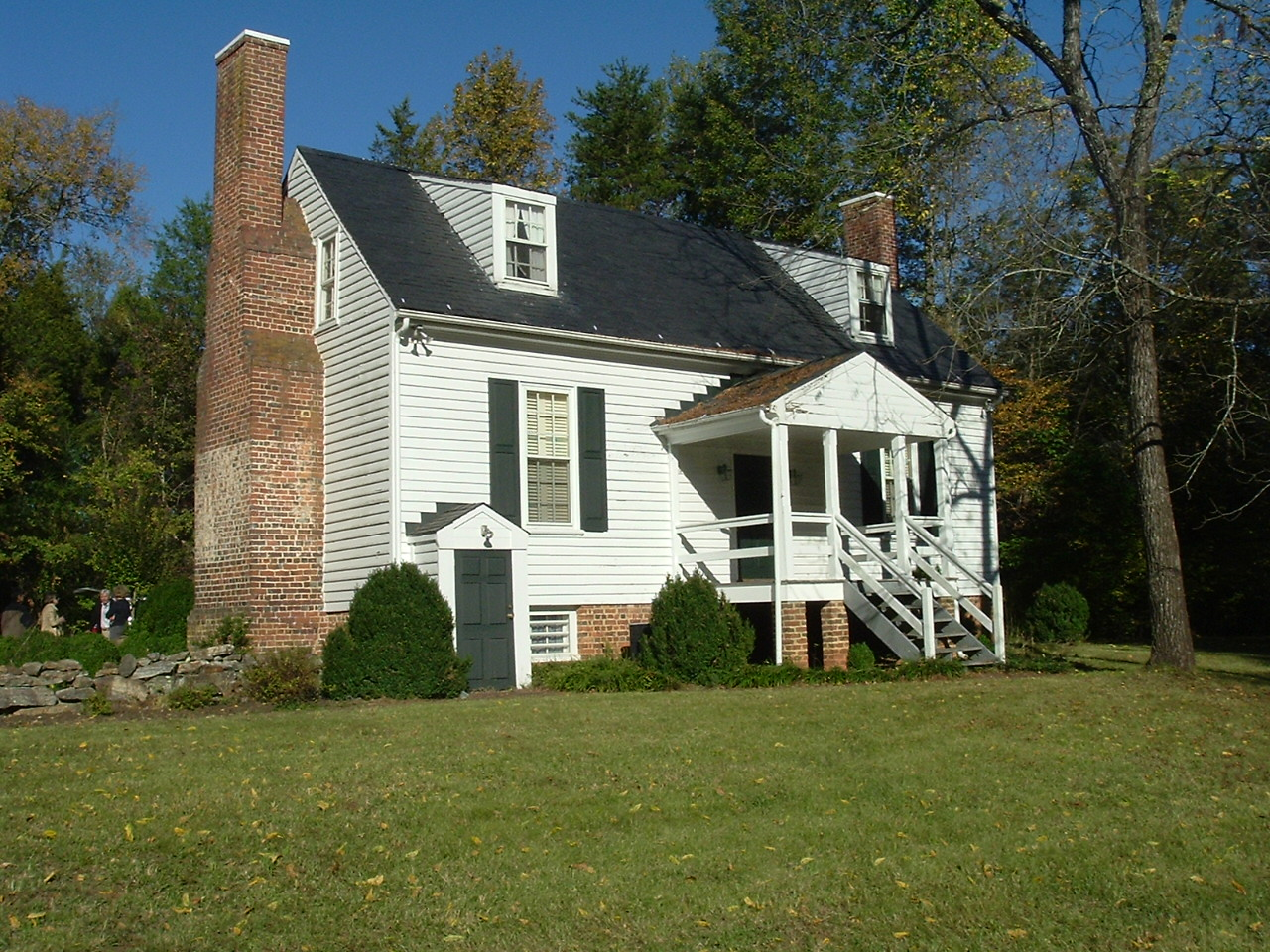
Back of the house

Locust Grove had deteriorated severely by the time it was surveyed for the National Register of Historic Places, to the point that it was marked as "Deteriorated" on the nomination form. Most of the framing survived, revealing the underlying structure of the house; however, many interior and exterior trappings had disappeared. In recent years, a great deal of restoration work has been performed on the structure, and it is once again in habitable condition.

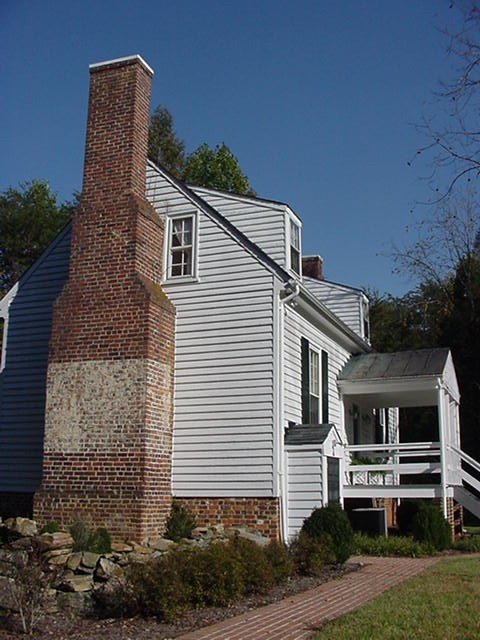
Side view of the house

== Location ==
Locust Grove is located almost a mile off of Virginia Route 626 near Buckingham County's border with Cumberland County. It sits on farm and scrub land at the end of a long dirt road, and is approached from the north. The building itself stands on the edge of a hill facing Payne Creek. It is highly isolated from the surrounding community. When it was built, the house was aligned with the Old Coach Road which once ran between Richmond and Appomattox; archaeological evidence of the roadbed has been uncovered not far from the property.

== History ==
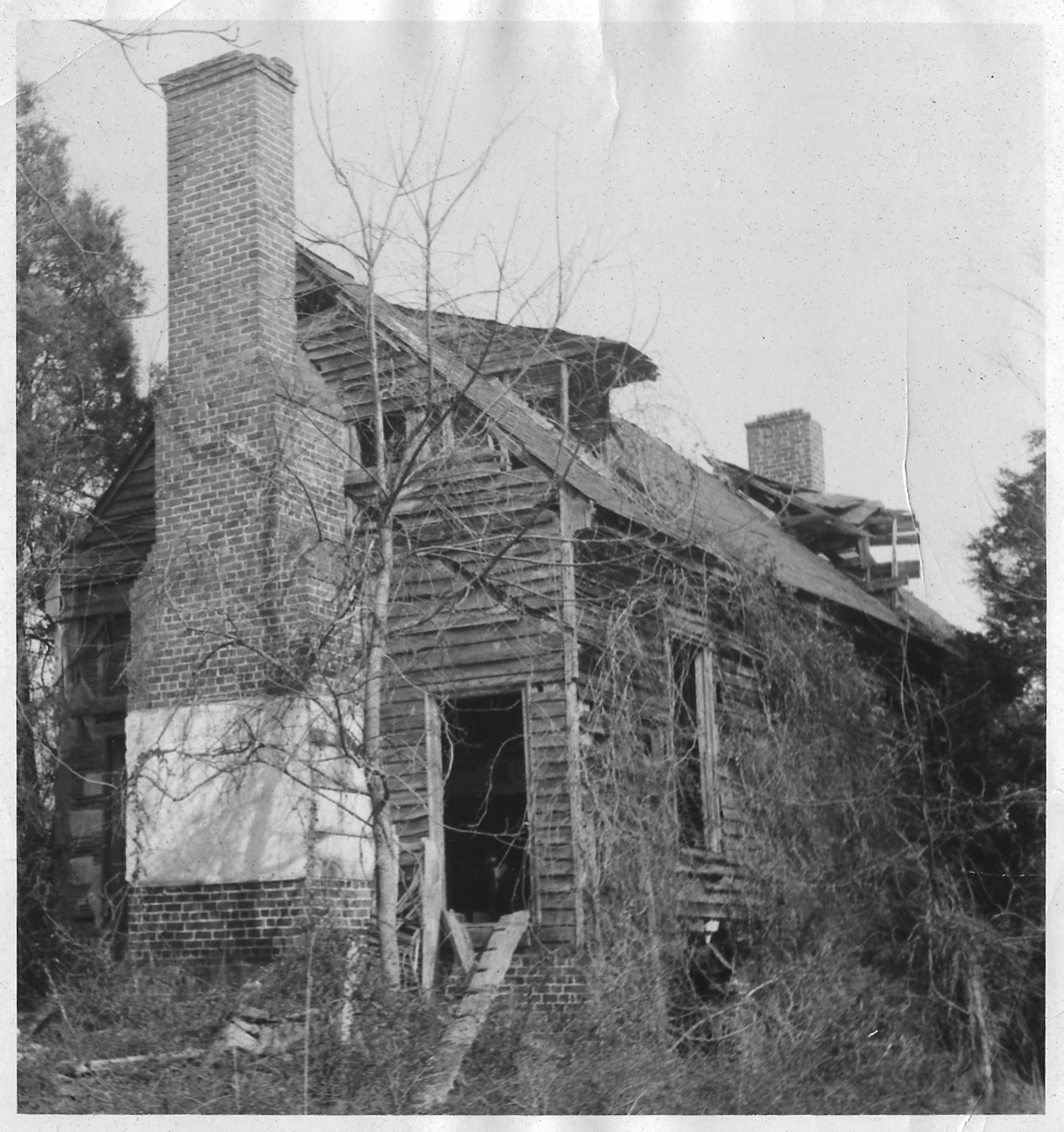
The house prior to its restoration

Little is known about the early history of Locust Grove. It was evidently constructed sometime before 1794, as Francisco took up residence in the house in that year, living there until the mid-1820s (one source states that he took possession in 1785, while another suggests, on the basis of style, a date between 1790 and 1810). Francisco himself had local ties, having grown up at Hunting Towers, the nearby estate of Patrick Henry's uncle Judge Anthony Winston. It is unknown how he came to own the land upon which Locust Grove sits; family tradition holds that he received it from local planter James Anderson, who had been the father of his first wife, Susannah. (Note: The probated copy of Anderson's will does, in fact, state that a portion of his land was to be allotted to Susannah and her husband upon her father's death; while it explicitly mentions the amount of land to be given, it does not mention a location. It would seem likely that Locust Grove was constructed on the land which the couple received in the will; no definitive proof, however, exists.) In any event, he lived there with his second wife, Catherine Brooke, with whom he raised four children. She died in 1821; two years later he married again, this time to a widowed niece of Governor Edmund Randolph. She persuaded him to leave the countryside for a more comfortable life in Richmond, where he worked as the Serjeant-at-Arms of the Senate of Virginia, and in which city he remained until his death.

Few records have survived from Francisco's time at Locust Grove. The little information that remains suggests that the farm was typical of those found around Virginia at the turn of the nineteenth century. A personal property tax inventory taken in 1815 indicates the presence in the household of seven slaves over twelve years old and one between nine and twelve, as well as six horses and twelve head of cattle. No carriage, watch, clock, or mahogany furniture was found, but the house's occupants were taxed for a mirror with gilded frame, two goblets made of cut glass, three pictures, and an unknown number of small gilt frames. This record indicates that, while Francisco was not among the Virginia gentry, he was most probably among the better-off residents of the county at the time.

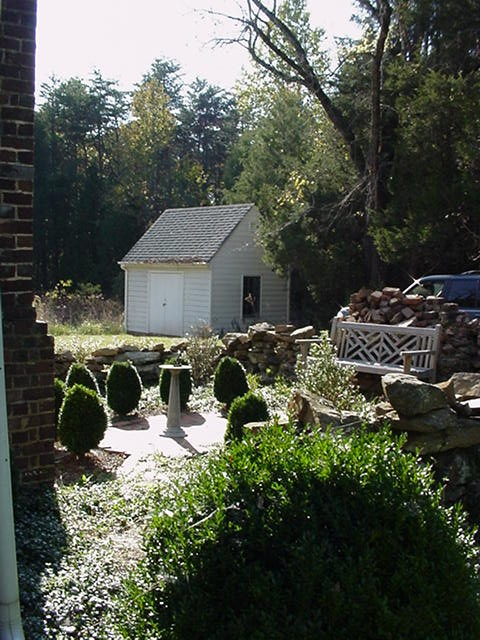
Side garden of the house

Peter Francisco died in 1831; after him, the next recorded tenant of Locust Grove was one Robert Rives, who owned it for a brief time in 1845. From him it passed on to John S. Coleman, who lived there until 1906. Abner Spencer then took ownership, living there until sometime after 1932. The Society of the Descendants of Peter Francisco took charge of the land beginning in the early 1970s, leasing it from its owners at the rate of one dollar a year. The intent was to restore the house and turn it into a museum and shrine dedicated to Francisco's memory; while the restoration was completed, due in part to matching funds granted by the United States government upon conferral of the National Register listing, the museum was never created, and the house reverted to private ownership. Today Locust Grove is owned by a couple from Richmond who use it as a second home.

A collection of papers related to the history of Locust Grove is part of the archive of the Society of the Descendants of Peter Francisco held at the Library of Virginia.

=== 1987 archaeological dig ===
As part of the restoration work done on Locust Grove in the late 1980s, students from Longwood College visited the home and grounds and conducted an archaeological dig which covered various portions of the property. Excavations were conducted at five points around the site, and a number of discoveries were made. Chief among these was the grave of an infant discovered in the corner of the former kitchen garden near the house. Oral tradition states that Francisco had a daughter who died in infancy sometime in the 1820s, and who was buried in the garden. There are no formal records either of such a burial or of the birth of the child; however, the discovery of the grave lends greater credence to the story. Also found on the grounds of the house were the remains of the foundation of a tobacco barn, known to have burned in 1826, (Note: Francisco mentions the loss of a year's tobacco crop in a letter of that year to the Virginia General Assembly, in which he uses it as justification in asking for back military pension pay to be paid him.) as well as some bits of ash and a large collection of nails and nail fragments. Excavations on and around the property also turned up the foundation and cellar of an old ice house, later used as a midden; the foundation of another small building, whose purpose remains uncertain; and a small spring associated through oral tradition with Peter Francisco. Numerous beams and door and window frames original to the house were found and replaced during the restoration and excavation; the originals were set aside in the basement for further study.

== See also ==
- National Register of Historic Places listings in Buckingham County, Virginia
