= Penlan, Virginia =

Unincorporated community in Virginia, United States

Coordinates: 37°39′50″N 78°22′02″W

Penlan is an unincorporated community in Buckingham County, in the U.S. state of Virginia.
