= Seven Islands Archeological and Historic District =

Archaeological site in Virginia, United States

- U.S. National Register of Historic Places
- U.S. Historic district
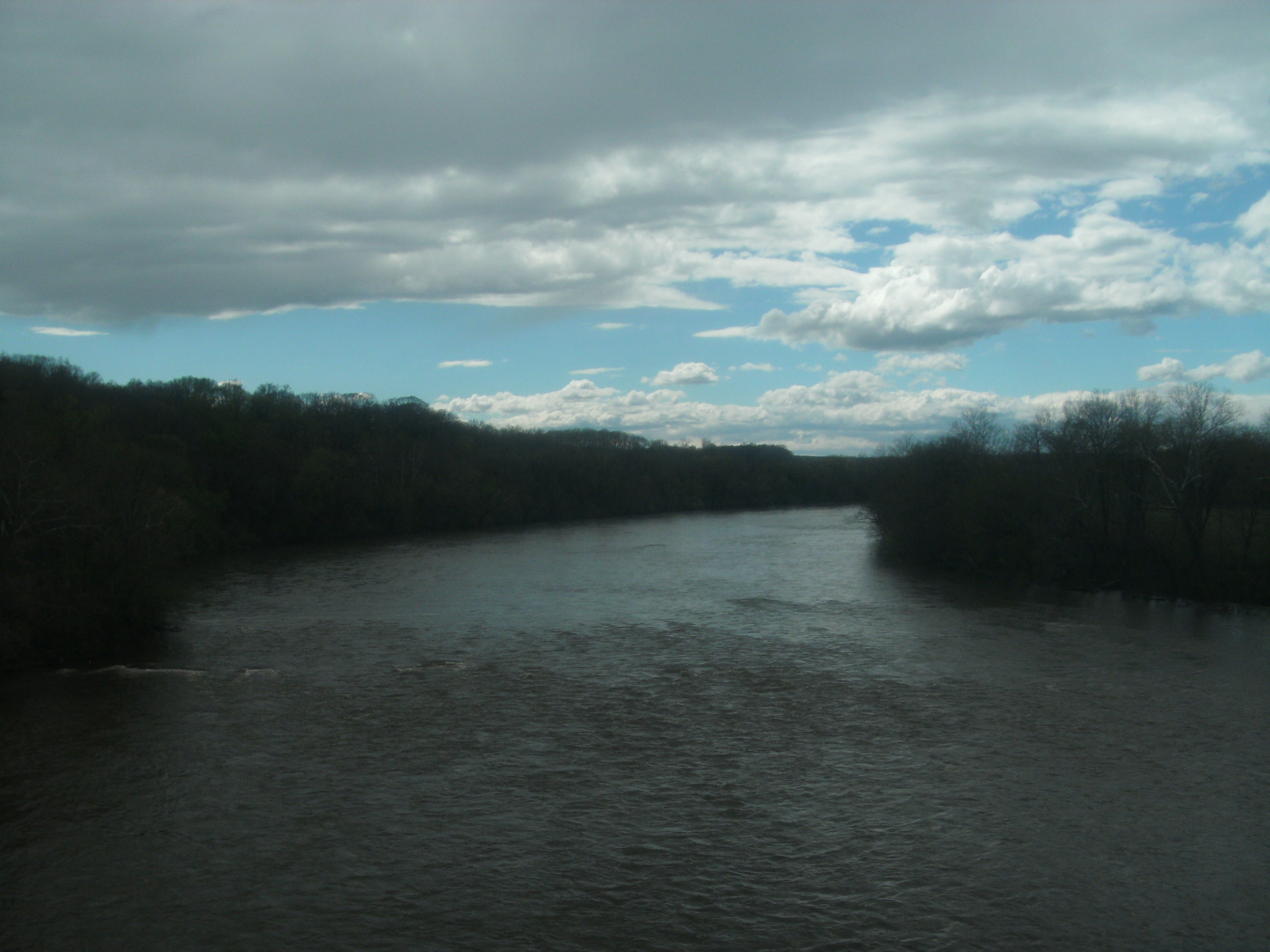
- The James River, on the border between Fluvanna and Buckingham Counties
- Nearest city: Arvonia, Virginia
- Area: 312 acres (126 ha)
- Built: 1847
- Architectural style: Greek Revival
- NRHP reference No.: 91000832
- Added to NRHP: July 3, 1991

The Seven Islands Archeological and Historic District encompasses a 312-acre (126 ha) site near the confluence of the James and Slate Rivers in Buckingham and Fluvanna Counties in Virginia. The site is notable for a number of prehistoric archaeological sites, the largest of which is a Woodland period Native American site, while smaller sites from earlier periods also exist in the area. The site is also notable for the Seven Islands house, a well-preserved Greek Revival I-house. It is situated on a bluff in Buckingham County with commanding views of the James River, across from the Bremo Plantation.

The district was listed on the National Register of Historic Places in 1991.
