= Julia A. Wood =

American writer and composer (1840–1927)

Julia Wood Kauffman
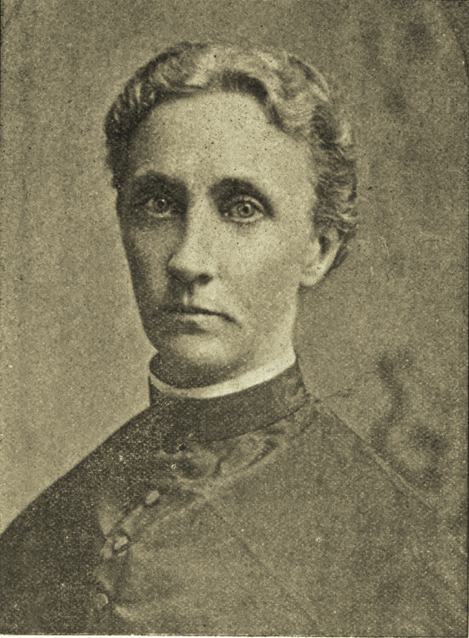
- Born: Julia A. Wood; February 10, 1840; Spring Garden, Fluvanna County, Virginia, U.S.
- Died: March 29, 1927 (aged 87); Bremo Bluff, Fluvanna County, Virginia, U.S.
- Education: Virginia Buckingham Collegiate Institute
- Occupations: writer; musical composer
- Spouse: Joseph N. Kauffman (m. 1891; died 1891)
- Writing career
- Language: English
- Genres: travelogue; autobiography; religious articles
- Notable works: My northern travels: the results of faith and prayer : based upon a tour of nine months through Illinois, Indiana, Michigan, New York, Ohio, Pennsylvania, and Canada. With the authors autobiography

Julia A. Wood (after marriage, Kauffman; February 10, 1840 – March 29, 1927) was an American writer and composer, known for her musical and literary talents. In addition to publishing a travel book with autobiography and some compositions, she wrote for her church's papers: The Pilgrim, Primitive Christian, Progressive Christian, the Brethren At Work and Gospel Preacher. Being the oldest daughter of fourteen children, she spent several years as their teacher. In 1891, Wood's husband died suddenly, a few days after their wedding and she never remarried. Wood died in 1927.

== Early life and education ==
Julia A. Wood was born in Spring Garden, Fluvanna County, Virginia, February 10, 1840. She was the fourth child of Henry Washington Wood and Phoebe Ann Walton Wood. Of their 14 children, seven died young. The family was divided in religious matters, the mother being a Wesleyan Methodist, two brothers Presbyterians, and a sister was an Episcopalian. From Julia's earliest recollection, she had a great desire to be prepared for heaven.

Chanie Jacobs, house-servant, nursed Wood as a child. After emancipation, the family hired Jacobs and her children and they stayed in the household.

In early childhood, her tutors were Dr. Samuel Brown, a cousin; Col. Geo. W. Pettit, and Dr. Geo. H. Snead. Next, she was boarded with the family of Joseph H. Turner at Columbia, Virginia, the governess being Miss Mary Harding, of Leesburg, Virginia, and then Miss Amanda Blair, of Georgia, Vermont. Lastly, she was boarded one year at Virginia Buckingham Collegiate Institute. Her studies were some of the Languages, Botany, Philosophy, Chemistry, Physiology, Astronomy, Music, Composition Histories, Worsted and French Work, and several kinds of Grammar.

== Career ==
At the beginning of the American Civil War (1861), her father owned 44 enslaved persons and about 1,300 acres (530 ha) of valuable James and Rivanna River lands, divided into two farms, 7 miles (11 km) apart. At the close of 1861, Wood was gradually attacked by a form of dyspepsia which at an advanced period entailed great suffering. At different times, various physicians were consulted; remedies prescribed, some beneficial and others aggravating. Occasionally there was such relief that Wood flattered herself cured. During this period until 1868, although quite suffering at times, Wood engaged in dancing, card-playing and kinds of amusements. She was particularly fond of dancing. She composed several instrumental and one vocal piece of music in 1866. Some of it was sold in different states.

Though the parents were able to keep the land after the war ended in 1865, the properties became burdenson and put the family into continued pecuniary straits. Wood's health continued alternating between relief and relapse 8.5 years. Other conditions would come and go including long-continued attacks of excruciating neuralgia and rheumatism (the result of an unavoidable accident, September 18, 1886) each of them more and more enfeebling to her delicate frame. At times, in the effort to cure one or the other of those additional diseases, the remedies so aggravated Wood's dyspepsia, it finally assumed a chronic form and general prostration ensued. Two successive months, she could not sleep during the day, and could sleep only two hours during the night. She took no opiates. In spring, often for several weeks it was only by the greatest effort that she could raise her voice to an audible tone. So great was her aversion to being considered an invalid, or of being entirely dependent upon others, that she did not cease to walk about the house, often doing so when she struggled to support herself standing.

During the period of April 20–27, 1869, Wood suffered pangs with a joint-felon, on the second finger of her left hand, which disabled her arm and hand for some months. From the middle of 1869 until May 1871, she did little or no work, except to daily attend in a struggling manner to her bed-chamber, then quietly sit in it, read the Bible and all the religious books she could get. An Episcopal woman, Mary B. Galt, provided Wood with reading materials including Goulborne's Thoughts on Personal Religion, and Stepping Heavenward.

Towards the close of 1871, Wood was daily employed in sewing, until late in March 1872, she began teaching her youngest brothers, Virgil and Toutant. She volunteered to make a sacrifice in that matter. Feeling it to be a duty to provide them with home education, she continued to teach them every year, whether she was sick or well. Being the eldest sister, it devolved upon her to teach, at times, for seven successive years, the most of her brothers and sisters in their childhood days. In addition to that, she taught her two youngest brothers three successive years.

In January 1873, Wood was instantaneously seized with excruciating neuralgia of her face, continuing three successive months, the whole of every day, and the most of each night; that ended late in March, 1873. Desiring to be usefully employed, and too feeble for any kind of exertion, she resumed the task of completing a book for housekeepers she had begun, and laid aside a few years before. She continued that writing four and a half months, from October 1873 until the ensuing February 1874, with her Bible beside her for frequent examination. That continuous writing proved to be such a tax that Wood became thoroughly prostrated, with little or no relief, for the next six or seven months.

On October 4, 1874, Wood was baptized and joined the Brethren or German Baptists church, sometimes called "Dunkards" or "Tunkers", by outsiders.

For seven successive years after Wood joined the Brethren, she wrote by turns, for several of the church's papers: The Pilgrim, Primitive Christian, Progressive Christian, and occasionally for the Brethren At Work and Gospel Preacher. In 1877, she published Virginia cotillions, which contained cotillion music named for "Jeff Davis", "Robt. E. Lee", "Thos. J. Jackson", "Jas. Longsreet", "P.G.T. Beauregard", and the "Jas. E. B. Stuart".

In June 1879, Wood became so disabled by an accident that she had to suspend her public writing, except when necessity demanded otherwise, entailing additional suffering. Friends insisted upon Wood traveling North, or to the coast to try and improve her health and thus she did. That tour lead to publication of her book, My northern travels: the results of faith and prayer : based upon a tour of nine months through Illinois, Indiana, Michigan, New York, Ohio, Pennsylvania, and Canada. With the authors autobiography in 1887.

== Personal life ==
On January 11, 1891, she married Rev. Joseph N. Kauffman, a Brethren minister of New Carlisle, Ohio. He died January 19, 1891, from a stroke of apoplexy, just days after the wedding.

Julia Wood Kauffman died in Bremo Bluff, Fluvanna County, Virginia, March 29, 1927.

== Selected works ==
=== Books ===
My Northern Travels, 1887

- My northern travels: the results of faith and prayer : based upon a tour of nine months through Illinois, Indiana, Michigan, New York, Ohio, Pennsylvania, and Canada. With the authors autobiography. (Ashland, Ohio: Brethren Pub. House., 1887)

=== Articles ===
- "My Spiritual Captivity, with its Intermediate State"

== Musical scores ==
- Virginia cotillions (1877)
