= Saint Joy, Virginia =

Unincorporated community in Virginia, United States

- Unincorporated community
- Location within Virginia Location within the United States
- Coordinates: 37°32′20″N 78°38′49″W
- Country: United States
- State: Virginia
- County: Buckingham
- Elevation: 561 ft (171 m)
- Time zone: UTC-5 (Eastern (EST))
  - Summer (DST): UTC-4 (EDT)
- Area code: 434
- GNIS ID: 1477711

Saint Joy is an unincorporated community in Buckingham County, in the U.S. state of Virginia.

Perry Hill was listed on the National Register of Historic Places in 1980.
