= Bryn Arvon and Gwyn Arvon =

Historic houses in Virginia, United States

- U.S. National Register of Historic Places
- Virginia Landmarks Register
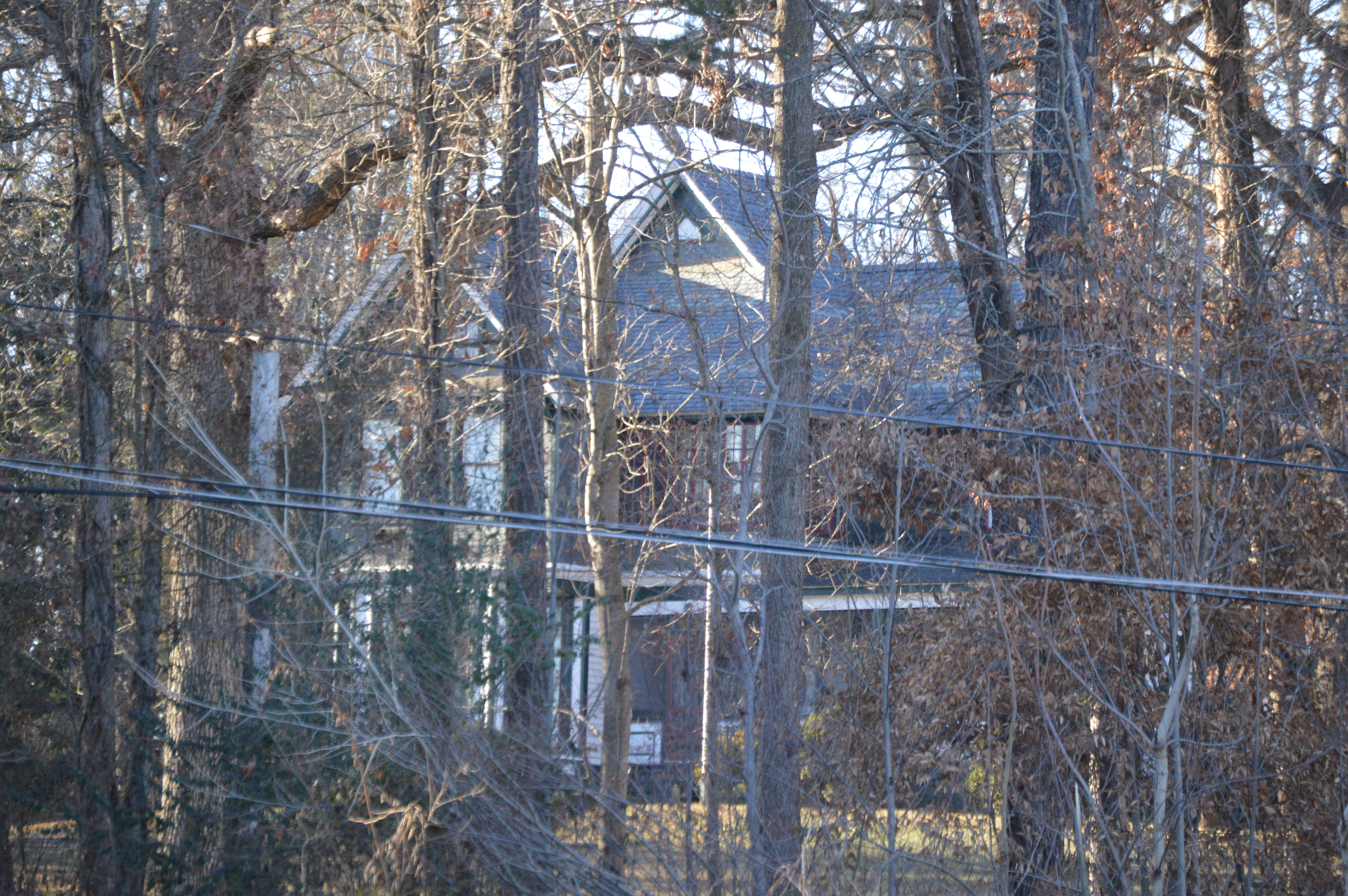
- Gwyn Arvon seen through nearby trees

- Location within Virginia Location within the United States
- Location: VA 675, Arvonia, Virginia
- Coordinates: 37°41′24″N 78°21′06″W
- Area: 6.5 acres (2.6 ha)
- Built: 1891-1892
- Architectural style: Queen Anne
- NRHP reference No.: 90002111
- VLR No.: 014-0005

Significant dates
- Added to NRHP: January 3, 1991
- Designated VLR: August 21, 1990

Bryn Arvon and Gwyn Arvon are two historic homes located at Arvonia, Buckingham County, Virginia. They were built about 1891–1892, and are two slate-covered Queen Anne style dwellings. Also on the property are a contributing garage, water tower, barn, two entrance piers, the site of a house foundation, a pump house, and a storage building.

The houses were listed on the National Register of Historic Places in 1991.
