= Yogaville, Virginia =

Yogaville
- CDP
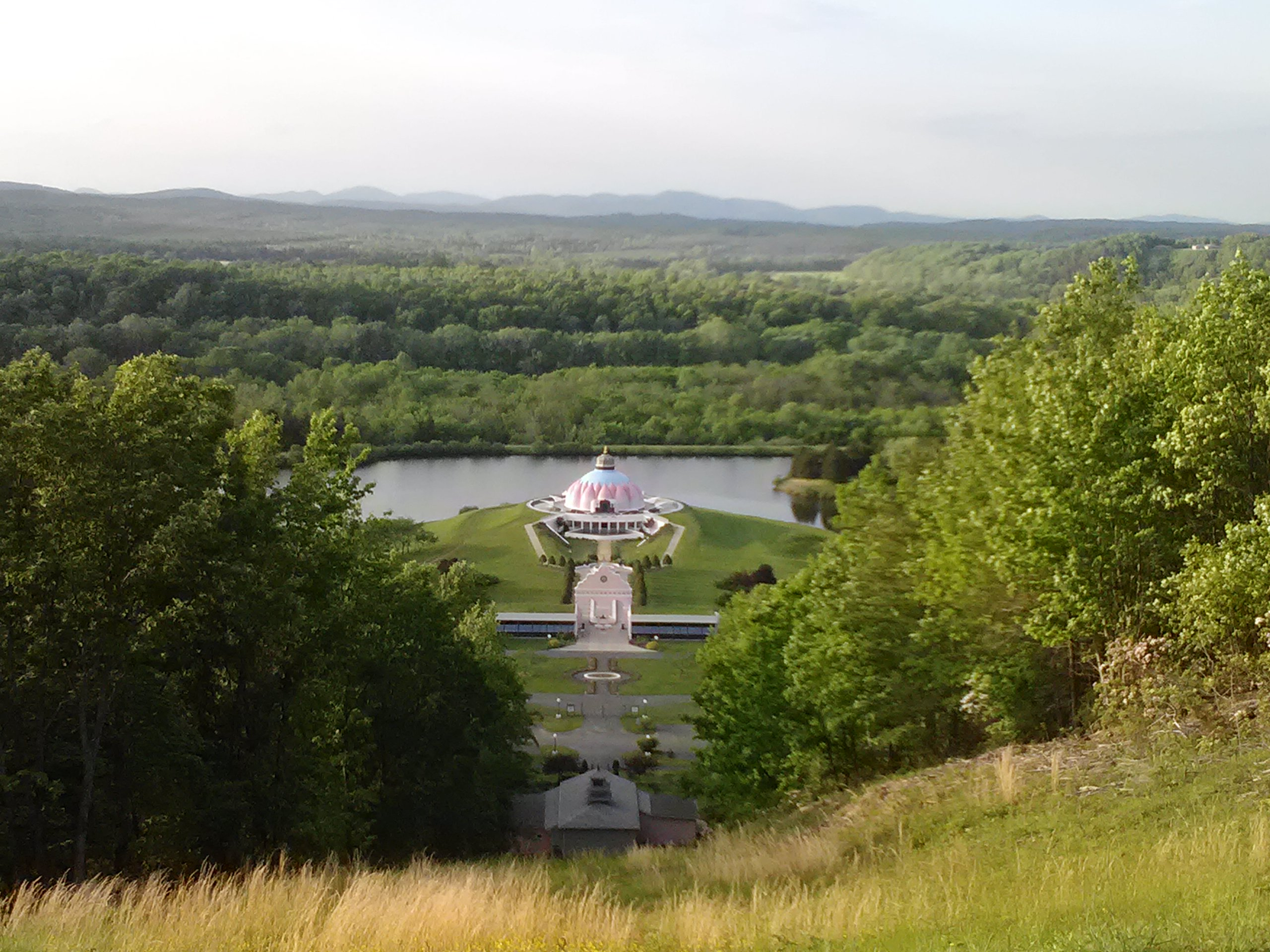

- Location within the Commonwealth of Virginia
- Coordinates: 37°39′54″N 78°41′33″W
- Country: United States
- State: Virginia
- County: Buckingham

Population (2020)
  - Total: 140
- Time zone: UTC−5 (Eastern (EST))
  - Summer (DST): UTC−4 (EDT)
- ZIP codes: 23921
- FIPS code: 51-88145
- GNIS feature ID: 2584940

Yogaville is a census-designated place in northwestern Buckingham County, Virginia United States. As of the 2020 census, Yogaville had a population of 242. The interfaith yoga community Satchidananda Ashram - Yogaville is the major physical feature and population center of the CDP.

== Demographics ==
Historical population
Census	Pop.	Note	%±
2010	226		—
2020	242		7.1%
U.S. Decennial Census; 2010 2020

Yogaville was first listed as a census designated place in the 2010 U.S. census.
