= Perry Hall =

Perry Hall may refer to:

- Perry Hall, Birmingham, whose grounds are now Perry Hall Park
- Perry Hall Mansion in Baltimore County, Maryland, named after the above
- The district of Perry Hall, Maryland, name after Perry Hall Mansion
- Perry Hall High School, Baltimore County, Maryland
- Perry Hall (baseball) (1898–1993), American Negro league baseball player
- Perry Hall, London, a place in the London Borough of Bromley, United Kingdom

== See also ==
- Perry Hill (disambiguation)
