= Buckingham Training School =

- U.S. National Register of Historic Places
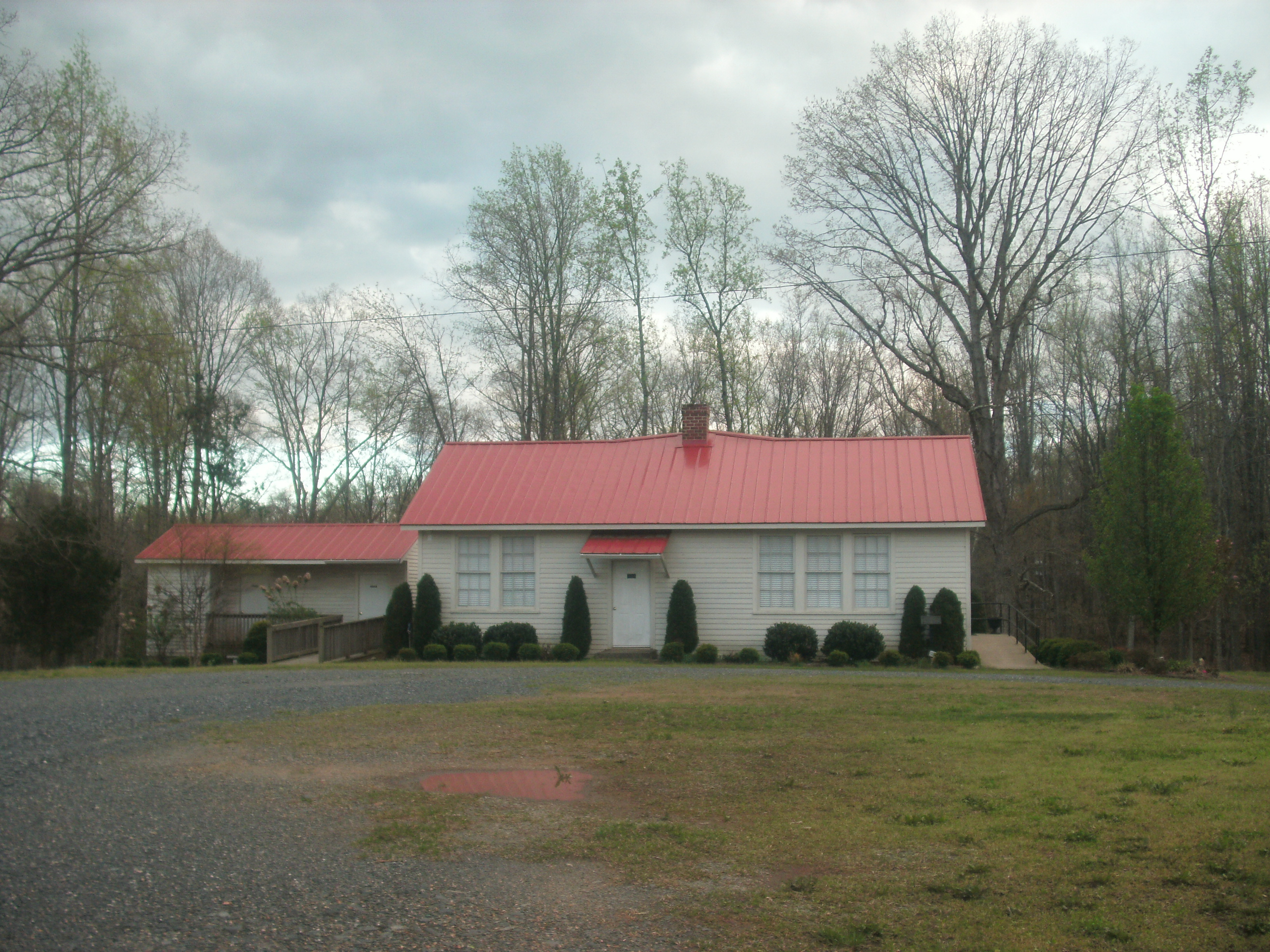
- Former Buckingham Training School, seen in April 2017

- Location within Virginia Location within the United States
- Location: 256 Camden St., Dillwyn, Virginia
- Coordinates: 37°32′0″N 78°27′48″W
- Area: 9.25 acres (3.74 ha)
- Built: 1932
- NRHP reference No.: 15000013
- Added to NRHP: February 13, 2015

The Buckingham Training School is a historic school property at 245 Camden Street in Dillwyn, Virginia. Now Ellis Acres Memorial Park, the property's centerpiece is a community center that was built in 1932 as the automotive shop building of the local Rosenwald School. The building was one of 11 such facilities built with Rosenwald funds in Virginia, and one of about 160 nationwide. It is a modest single-story wood-frame structure with a concrete block foundation and weatherboard siding. Its interior has retained many original features despite standing vacant and the undergoing rehabilitation for use as a community center.

The property was listed on the National Register of Historic Places in 2015.

== See also ==
- National Register of Historic Places listings in Buckingham County, Virginia
