= Perry Hill (Saint Joy, Virginia) =

Historic house in Virginia, United States

- U.S. National Register of Historic Places
- Virginia Landmarks Register
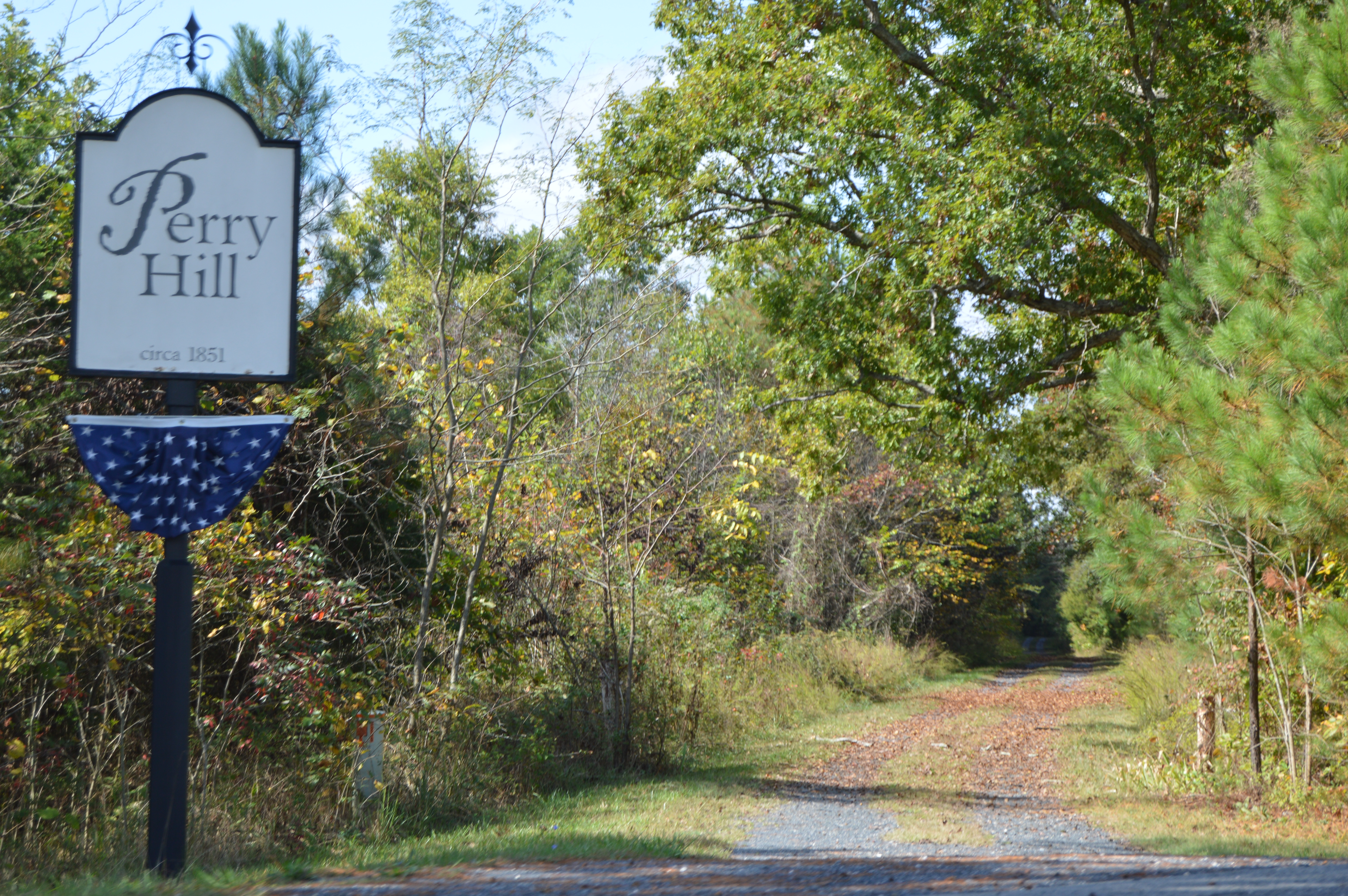
- Entrance to the property

- Location within Virginia Location within the United States
- Location: VA 56, Saint Joy, Virginia
- Coordinates: 37°33′49″N 78°37′59″W
- Area: 42 acres (17 ha)
- Built: c. 1851-1852
- Architectural style: Gothic Revival
- NRHP reference No.: 80004176
- VLR No.: 014-0019

Significant dates
- Added to NRHP: October 30, 1980
- Designated VLR: July 31, 1980

Perry Hill is a historic home located near Saint Joy, Buckingham County, Virginia. It was built about 1851–1852, and is a two-story, brick dwelling in the Gothic Revival style. It has a central hall plan and features pointed arch windows and hipped roof with gables.

It was listed on the National Register of Historic Places in 1980.
