= Chellowe =

Historic plantation house in Virginia, US

- U.S. National Register of Historic Places
- Virginia Landmarks Register
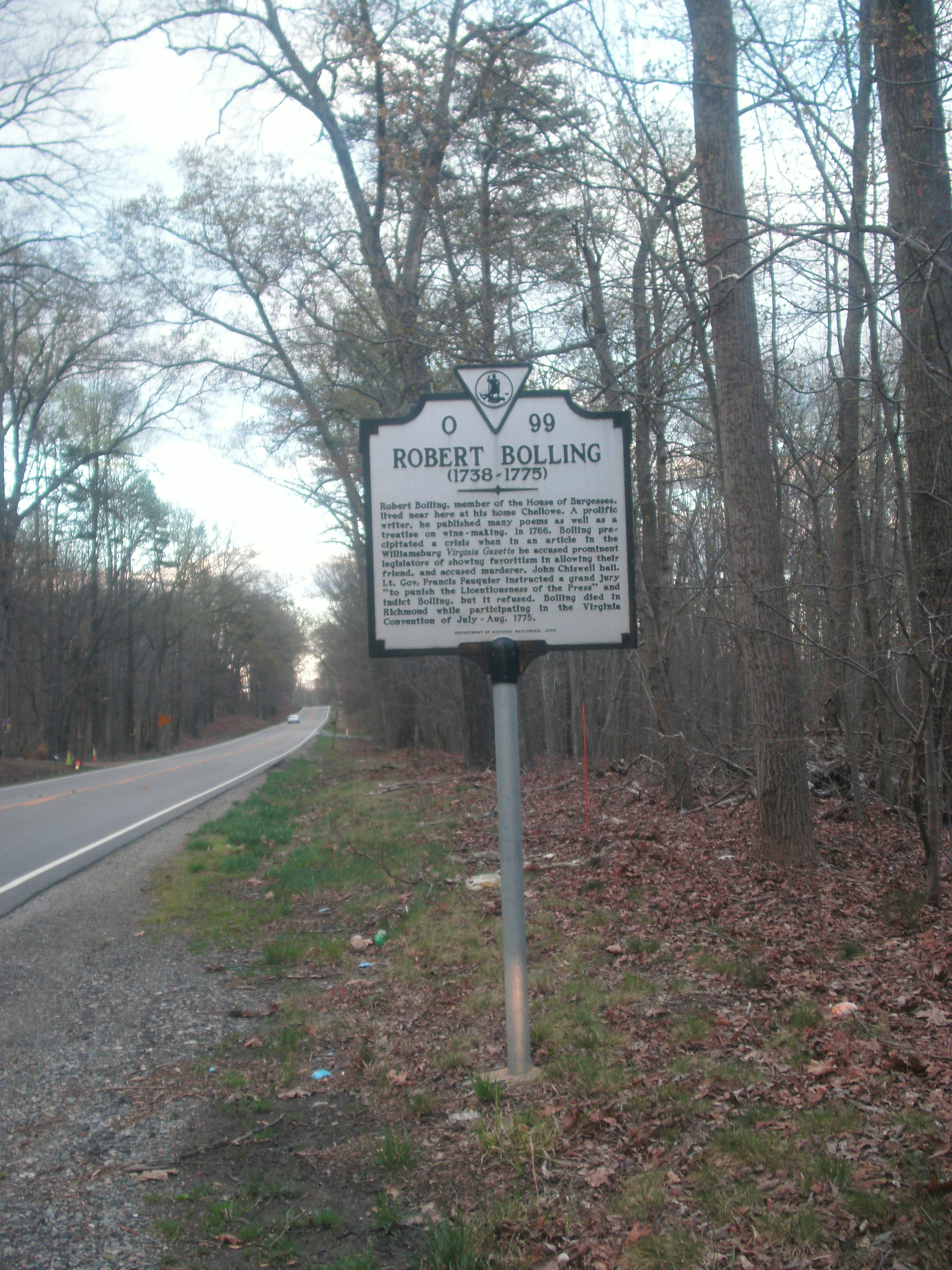
- State historic marker, on U.S. Route 60 in Buckingham County

- Location within Virginia Location within the United States
- Location: VA 56, Sprouses Corner, Virginia
- Coordinates: 37°29′6″N 78°24′54″W
- Area: 8 acres (3.2 ha)
- Built: c. 1800, c. 1820, c. 1840
- Architect: Parrish, Valentine
- Architectural style: Gothic Revival, Classical Revival
- NRHP reference No.: 99000961
- VLR No.: 014-0007

Significant dates
- Added to NRHP: August 5, 1999
- Designated VLR: June 16, 1999

Chellowe is a historic plantation house located on county route 623 in Buckingham County, Virginia. The main house was built about 1820 and modified about 1840. It is a two-story, three part, frame dwelling with Gothic Revival and Classical Revival style detailing. It features a two-story tetrastyle portico with Chippendale railings. Also on the property are a contributing kitchen (c. 1800), office (c. 1840), and garden terraces developed in the 19th century.

It was listed on the National Register of Historic Places in 1999.
