= Guerrant House (Arvonia, Virginia) =

Historic house in Virginia, United States

- U.S. National Register of Historic Places
- Virginia Landmarks Register
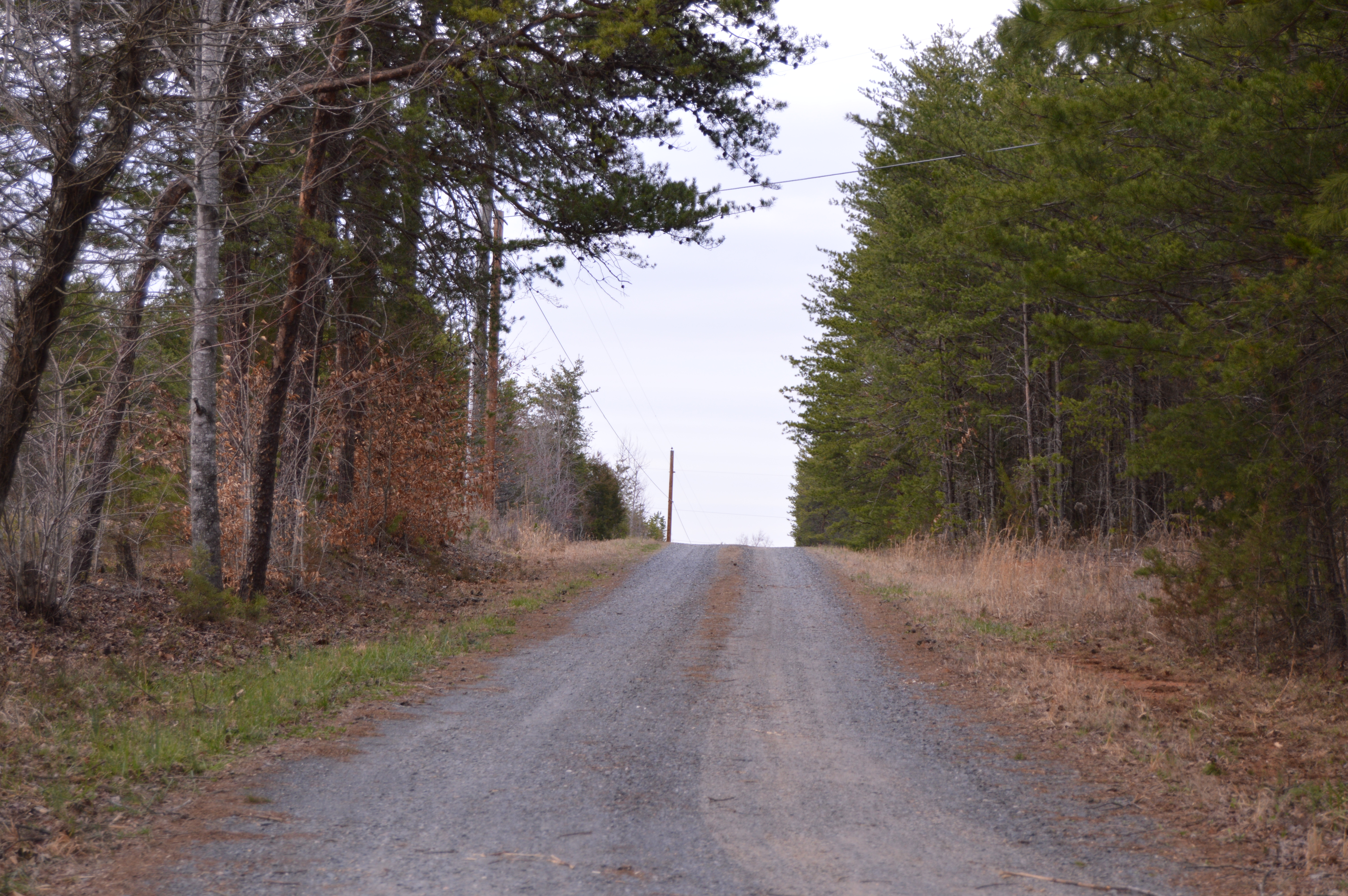
- Property entrance

- Location within Virginia Location within the United States
- Location: Rte. 1, Arvonia, Virginia
- Coordinates: 37°43′45″N 78°23′29″W
- Area: 9 acres (3.6 ha)
- Built: 1835
- Built by: Peter Guerrant
- Architectural style: Federal
- NRHP reference No.: 00001497
- VLR No.: 014-5001

Significant dates
- Added to NRHP: December 7, 2000
- Designated VLR: September 13, 2000

Guerrant House is a historic home located near Arvonia, Buckingham County, Virginia. It was built about 1835, and consists of a 1 1/2-story, two room frame house with a separate kitchen set perpendicular to the rear of the main block. It features typical Federal period decorative and construction details. They include beaded weatherboards, a boxed cornice with dentils, and shouldered chimneys.

It was listed on the National Register of Historic Places in 2000.
