= Union Hill, Buckingham County, Virginia =

Unincorporated community in Buckingham County, Virginia, US

Coordinates: 37°35′49″N 78°38′30″W

Union Hill is an unincorporated community in central Buckingham County, Virginia, United States, that was founded by freedmen after the Civil War. This community is one of many Virginia-based freedman's towns, or freetowns, as they are known in the Piedmont region of Virginia.

== Atlantic Coast Pipeline ==
On January 7, 2020, the US Fourth Circuit Court of Appeals rejected a permit for a fracked gas pipeline air compressor station in Union Hill to serve the Atlantic Coast Pipeline, on the grounds that concerns about impacts on the historic African American community had not been adequately addressed per the Virginia Environmental Justice Act.

The proposed pipeline would not only affect the locals of Union Hill but also a majority of Native American tribes south as the pipeline would have extended into North Carolina.
