= Stanton Family Cemetery =

Historic cemetery in Virginia, United States

- U.S. National Register of Historic Places
- Virginia Landmarks Register
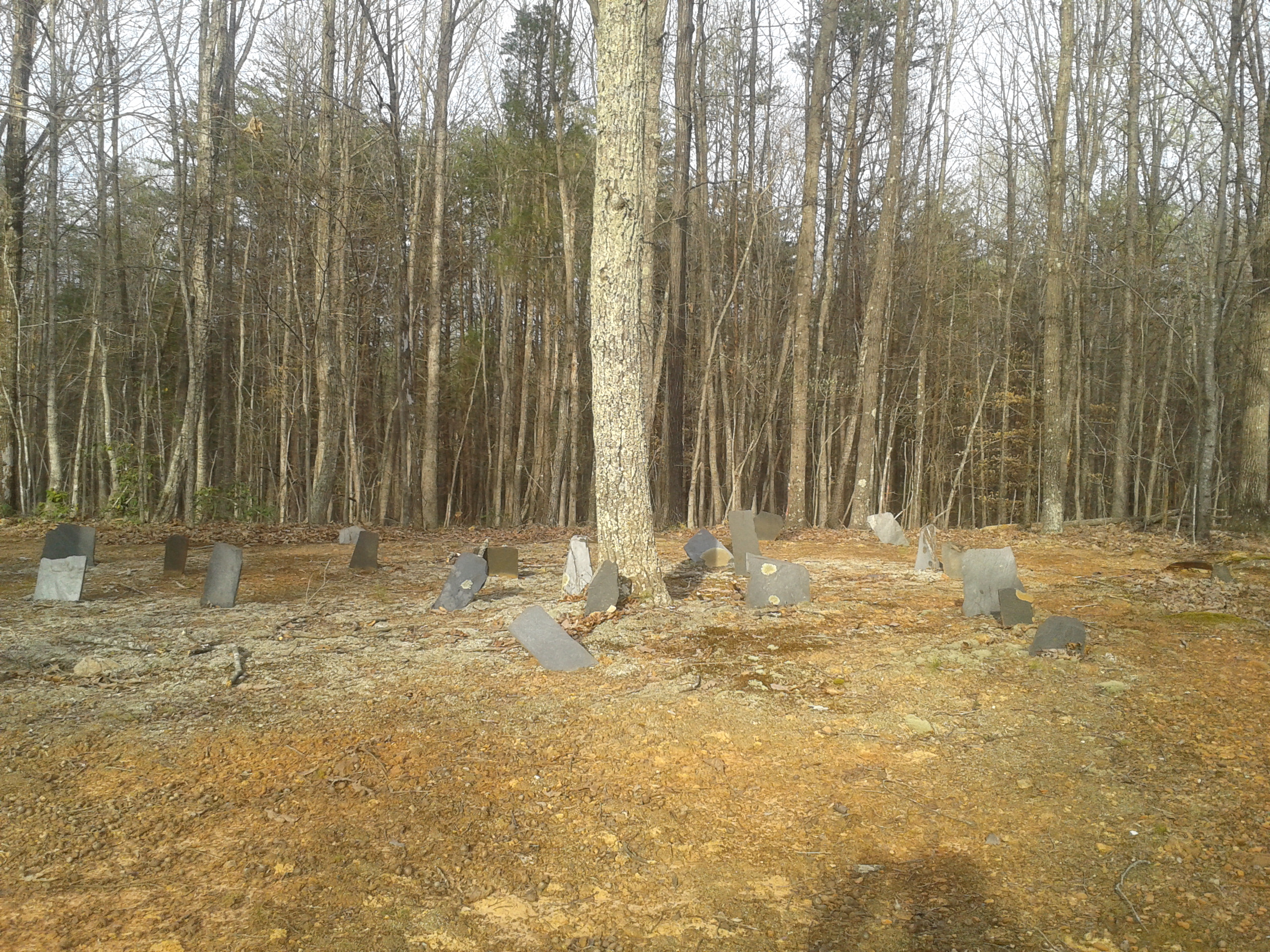
- Buckingham slate markers at the cemetery, April, 2017

- Location within Virginia Location within the United States
- Location: VA 677 E side, 0.4 mi. N of jct. with VA 676, Diana Mills, Virginia
- Coordinates: 37°39′22″N 78°23′42″W
- Area: 1 acre (0.40 ha)
- NRHP reference No.: 93000350
- VLR No.: 014-0052

Significant dates
- Added to NRHP: April 29, 1993
- Designated VLR: February 17, 1993

Stanton Family Cemetery is a historic cemetery located at Buckingham County, Virginia. It is an African-American rural cemetery with approximately 36 burials. The graves are marked with headstones and footstones of irregularly shaped slabs of local Buckingham slate. The stones mark the graves of at least four generations of the Stanton family.

It was listed on the National Register of Historic Places in 1993.
