= Dillwyn, Virginia =

- Town
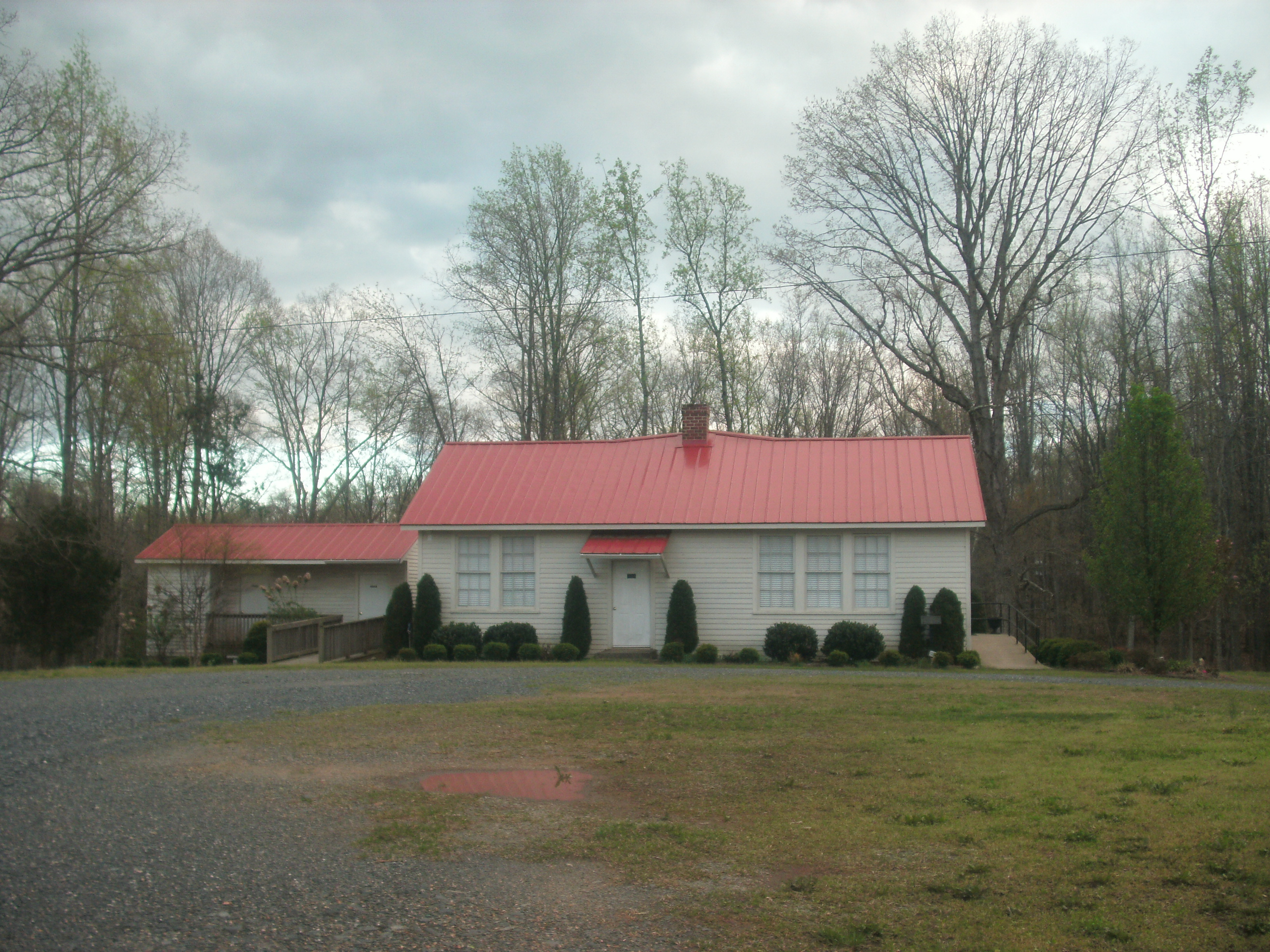
- The former Buckingham Training School on Camden Street

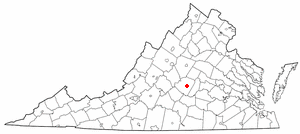
- Location of Dillwyn, Virginia
- Coordinates: 37°32′30″N 78°27′32″W
- Country: United States
- State: Virginia
- County: Buckingham

Area
  - Total: 0.64 sq mi (1.67 km^{2})
  - Land: 0.64 sq mi (1.67 km^{2})
  - Water: 0 sq mi (0.00 km^{2})
- Elevation: 643 ft (196 m)

Population (2020)
  - Total: 436
  - Estimate (2019): 442
  - Density: 685.9/sq mi (264.82/km^{2})
- Time zone: UTC−5 (Eastern (EST))
  - Summer (DST): UTC−4 (EDT)
- ZIP Code: 23936
- Area code: 434
- FIPS code: 51-22560
- GNIS feature ID: 1492868
- Website: www.dillwynva.org

Dillwyn is an incorporated town in Buckingham County, Virginia, United States. As of the 2020 census, Dillwyn had a population of 436.

== History ==
The Peter Francisco House was listed on the National Register of Historic Places in 1972. It is located approximately nine miles east/southeast of the Town of Dillwyn. St. Thomas Aquinas Seminary was founded as the English-speaking seminary of the Society of St. Pius the X near Dillwyn in 1973.

== Geography ==
Dillwyn is located in east-central Buckingham County at 37°32′30″N 78°27′32″W (37.541658, −78.458869). U.S. Route 15 passes through the town, leading south 2 miles (3 km) to U.S. Route 60 and 23 miles (37 km) to Farmville, and north 37 miles (60 km) to Interstate 64, east of Charlottesville.

According to the United States Census Bureau, Dillwyn has a total area of 0.66 square miles (1.7 km^{2}), all land.

== Demographics ==
Historical population
Census	Pop.	Note	%±
1920	405		—
1930	442		9.1%
1940	436		−1.4%
1950	556		27.5%
1960	515		−7.4%
1970	497		−3.5%
1980	596		19.9%
1990	458		−23.2%
2000	447		−2.4%
2010	447		0.0%
2020	436		−2.5%
2023 (est.)	549	▲	25.9%
U.S. Decennial Census

At the 2010 census there were 447 people, 176 households, and 114 families living in the town. The population density was 646.4 people per square mile (250.1/km^{2}). There were 200 housing units at an average density of 289.2 per square mile (111.9/km^{2}). The racial makeup of the town was 57.27% White, 39.60% African American, 0.67% from other races, and 2.46% from two or more races. Hispanic or Latino of any race were 0.67%.

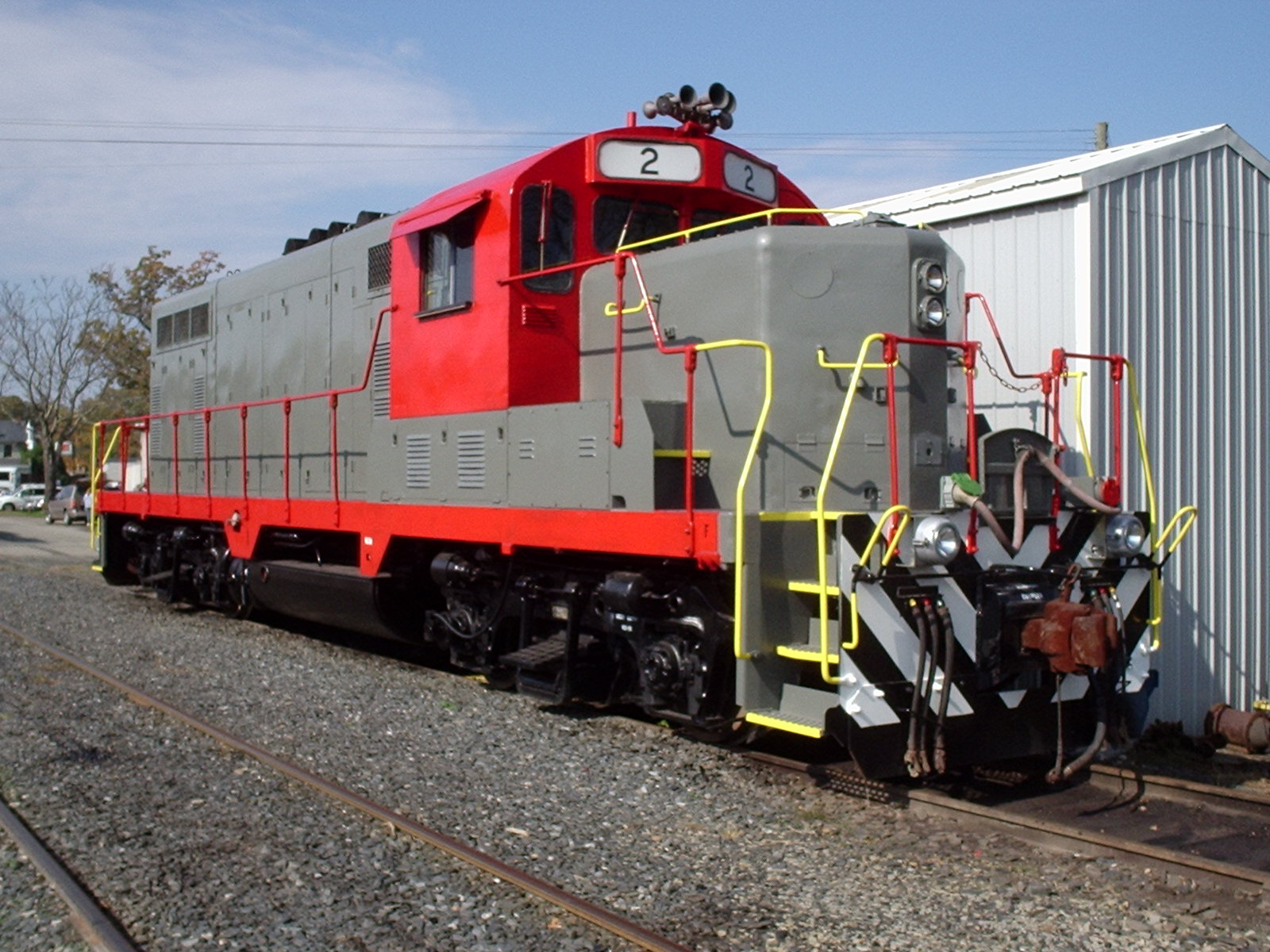
Dillwyn is home to the only rail service in the county, the Buckingham Branch Railroad, which runs north to New Canton.

Of the 176 households 30.7% had children under the age of 18 living with them, 38.6% were married couples living together, 22.2% had a female householder with no husband present, and 34.7% were non-families. 32.4% of households were one person and 19.9% were one person aged 65 or older. The average household size was 2.16 and the average family size was 2.63.

The age distribution was 20.6% under the age of 18, 4.3% from 18 to 24, 21.5% from 25 to 44, 24.2% from 45 to 64, and 29.5% 65 or older. The median age was 48 years. For every 100 females, there were 70.6 males. For every 100 females age 18 and over, there were 68.2 males.

The median household income was $19,167 and the median family income was $24,688. Males had a median income of $19,167 versus $17,868 for females. The per capita income for the town was $11,091. About 29.7% of families and 34.9% of the population were below the poverty line, including 59.2% of those under age 18 and 29.7% of those age 65 or over.
