= Perry Hill Stadium =

Sports venue in the UK

Perry Hill Greyhound Stadium
- Location: Catford, London
- Coordinates: 51°26′07″N 0°01′48″W
- Opened: early 1930s
- Closed: 1935

Perry Hill Greyhound Stadium was a greyhound racing stadium in Catford, London.

== Origins ==
A small greyhound track existed off the east side of the Perry Hill Road (which goes north from Lower Sydenham towards Catford Bridge) at the end of Rubens Street.

In 1930 three fields made up the green space of the area, the African Banks Athletic Ground, the City of London School Athletic Ground and the Forest Hill Cricket Ground. One of these was described and was also known by locals as the 'Dog Field' and evidence points to the latter being the field in question.

== History ==
The track opened in the early 1930s and was originally independent (unaffiliated to a governing body). In 1933 Mr Herbert Blann the co-manager of the track and residing in Rubens Street appeared in court to answer the allegations of using live rabbits to train greyhounds at Perry Hill, Forest Hill Greyhound Track.

It is probable that the management changed due to the fact that the track became affiliated to the British Greyhound Tracks Control Society (BGTCS), an organisation formed to assist tracks wishing to race under regulations and a rival to the bigger National Greyhound Racing Club (NGRC). In addition the track had basic tote facilities which also means that there were buildings on site although not necessarily substantial brick ones.

The track was issued a betting licence in February 1935 but the BGTCS disbanded in 1935 leaving the stadium unaffiliated.

== Midget Cars ==
Midget car racing took place for the first time at the Perry Hill Stadium on 7 June 1935.

== Closure ==
Business was hit by the construction of the nearby Catford Stadium in 1932 which left Perry Hill in a precarious position. The stadium was wound up in November 1935 and the business went on public sale in December offering a significant package.

Today the site is the Catford and Cyphers Cricket Club Ground.
