= Union Hill, California =

Union Hill
- Former settlement
- Location in California
- Coordinates: 39°12′20″N 121°02′15″W
- Country: United States
- State: California
- County: Nevada County
- Elevation: 2,700 ft (823 m)
- Time zone: UTC-8 (Pacific (PST))
  - Summer (DST): UTC-7 (PDT)

Union Hill is a former settlement in Nevada County, California, 1.5 mi (2.4 km) from Grass Valley. Its elevation is 2,700 ft (820 m) above sea level.

Gold mining is recorded as early as January 30, 1851. A number of mines yielded eighty dollars per ton at times. Sulfurets were said to yield 420 dollars per ton. First arrastres were in use, then a number of stamp mills.

The Union Hill School District, established in 1868, continues to operate in Grass Valley, though at a different location.

Beginning in 1876, travelers could reach Union Hill via the Nevada County Narrow Gauge Railroad. Its station was located on the Union Hill road, southeast of Grass Valley and northwest of Colfax.

The Union Hill mine was a good producer of gold for many years.
