= Arvonia, Virginia =

Unincorporated community in Virginia, United States

- Unincorporated community
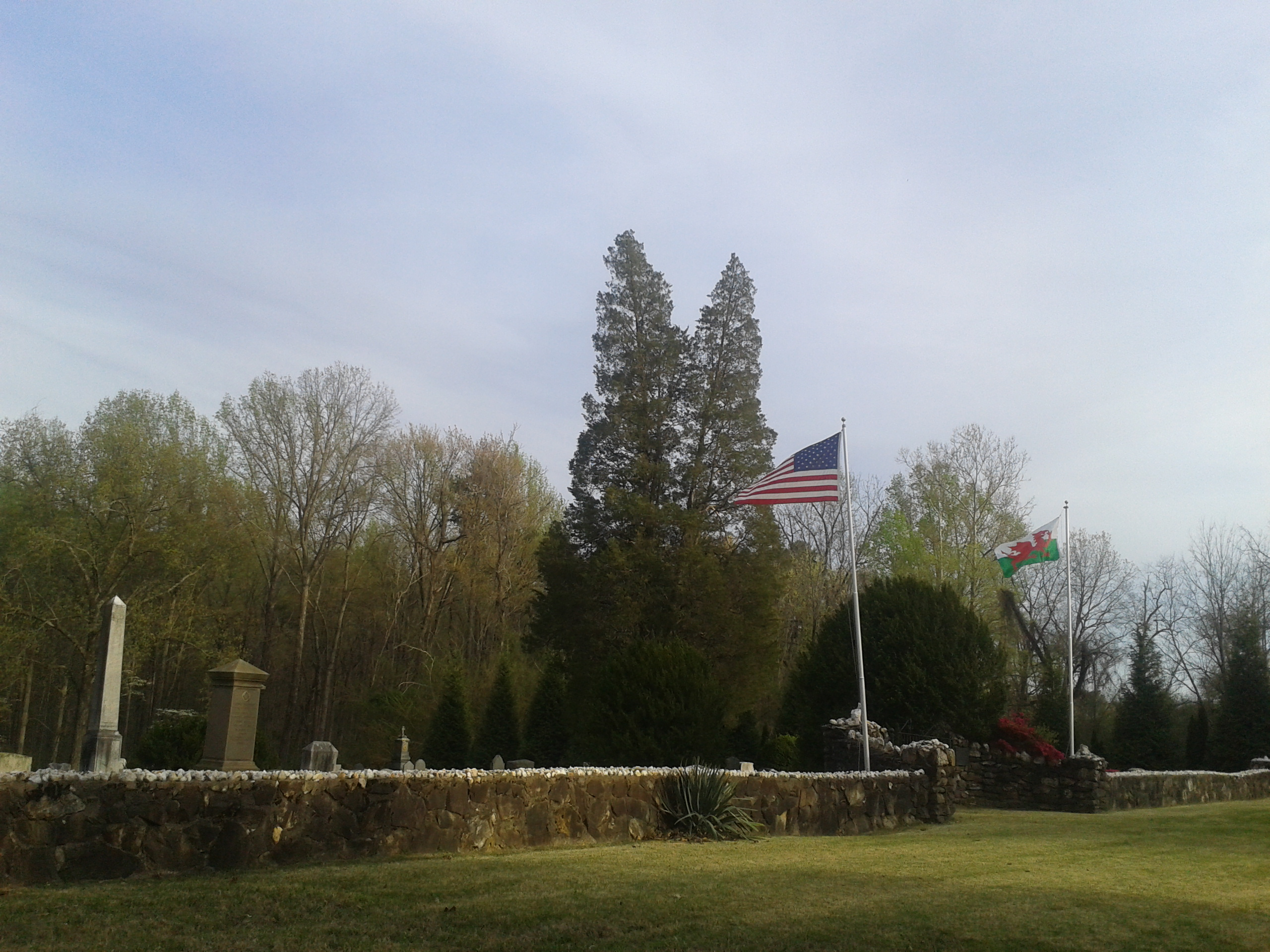
- Arvonia's cemetery flies the American and Welsh flags

- Location within Virginia Location within the United States
- Coordinates: 37°41′01″N 78°20′29″W
- Country: United States
- State: Virginia
- County: Buckingham
- Elevation: 367 ft (112 m)
- Time zone: UTC-5 (Eastern (EST))
  - Summer (DST): UTC-4 (EDT)
- Area code: 434
- GNIS feature ID: 1462571

Arvonia is an unincorporated community in Buckingham County, Virginia, United States, founded mainly by Welsh immigrants during the mid-19th century. The town derives its name from the county of Caernarfon, Wales (until the 1970s two Englished spellings were in use - Carnarvon and Caernarvon). The county is known popularly simply as Arfon (in English spelling, Arvon). "Arvonia" is the Latin form of the name. Its major industry has been slate mining. The slate is known primarily for its color and durability, and is featured on many prominent American buildings, such as the Smithsonian Castle, the University of Virginia, Berkeley, Virginia's Executive Mansion, and Colonial Revival homes across the country. Buckingham slate quarried in Arvonia earned gold medals at the Philadelphia Exposition in 1876, the 1893 World's Columbia Exposition, and the Louisiana Purchase Exposition at the 1904 Saint Louis World's Fair. Arvonia-Buckingham Slate Corporation was incorporated in 1913 and its operations continue in the present day.

Arvonia is also home to Hi-Test Labs, which has provided testing, research, and design to the U.S. government and private industry since 1975.

In 1885 Arvon Presbyterian Church was founded to serve the many Welsh miners in the Slate Quarry. The sanctuary portion of the church was destroyed by fire in 2009 and after being rebuilt to its original design, it reopened on Palm Sunday, April 12, 2012.

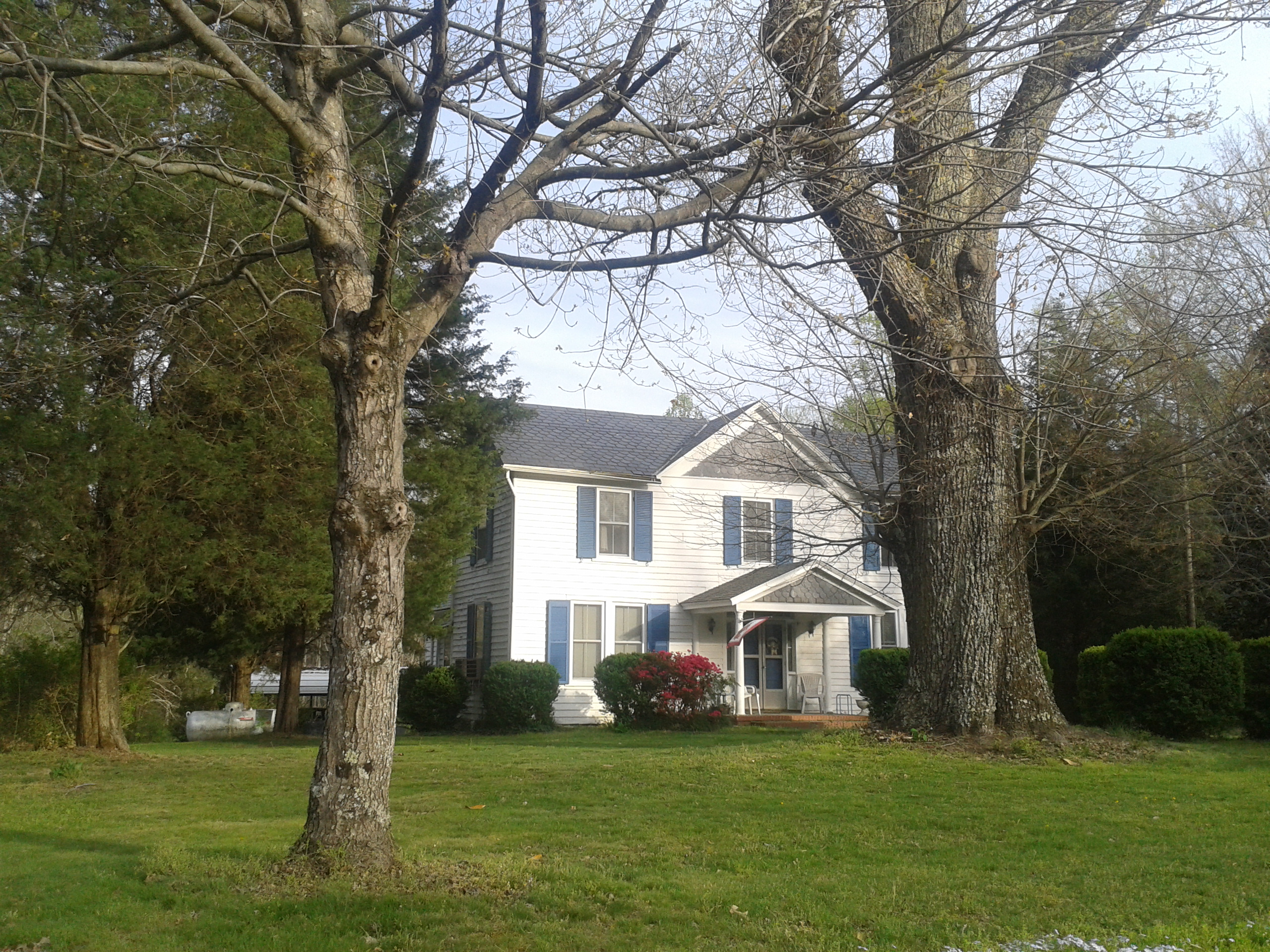
A house in Arvonia, trimmed with slate facings

Bryn Arvon and Gwyn Arvon, in Arvonia, are listed on the National Register of Historic Places. Guerrant House and Seven Islands Archeological and Historic District, also NRHP-listed, are both near Arvonia.
