= Central-passage house =

House type

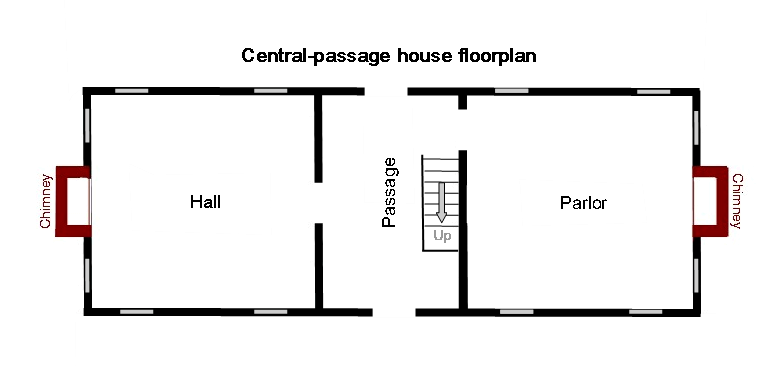
Floor plan of a basic central-passage house.

The central-passage house, also known variously as central hall plan house, center-hall house, hall-passage-parlor house, Williamsburg cottage, and Tidewater-type cottage, was a vernacular, or folk form, house type from the colonial period onward into the 19th century in the United States.

== History ==
Central-passage house evolved primarily in colonial Maryland and Virginia from the hall and parlor house, beginning to appear in greater numbers by about 1700. It partially developed as greater economic security and developing social conventions transformed the reality of the American landscape, but it was also heavily influenced by its formal architectural relatives, the Palladian and Georgian styles with their emphasis on symmetry.

== Features ==
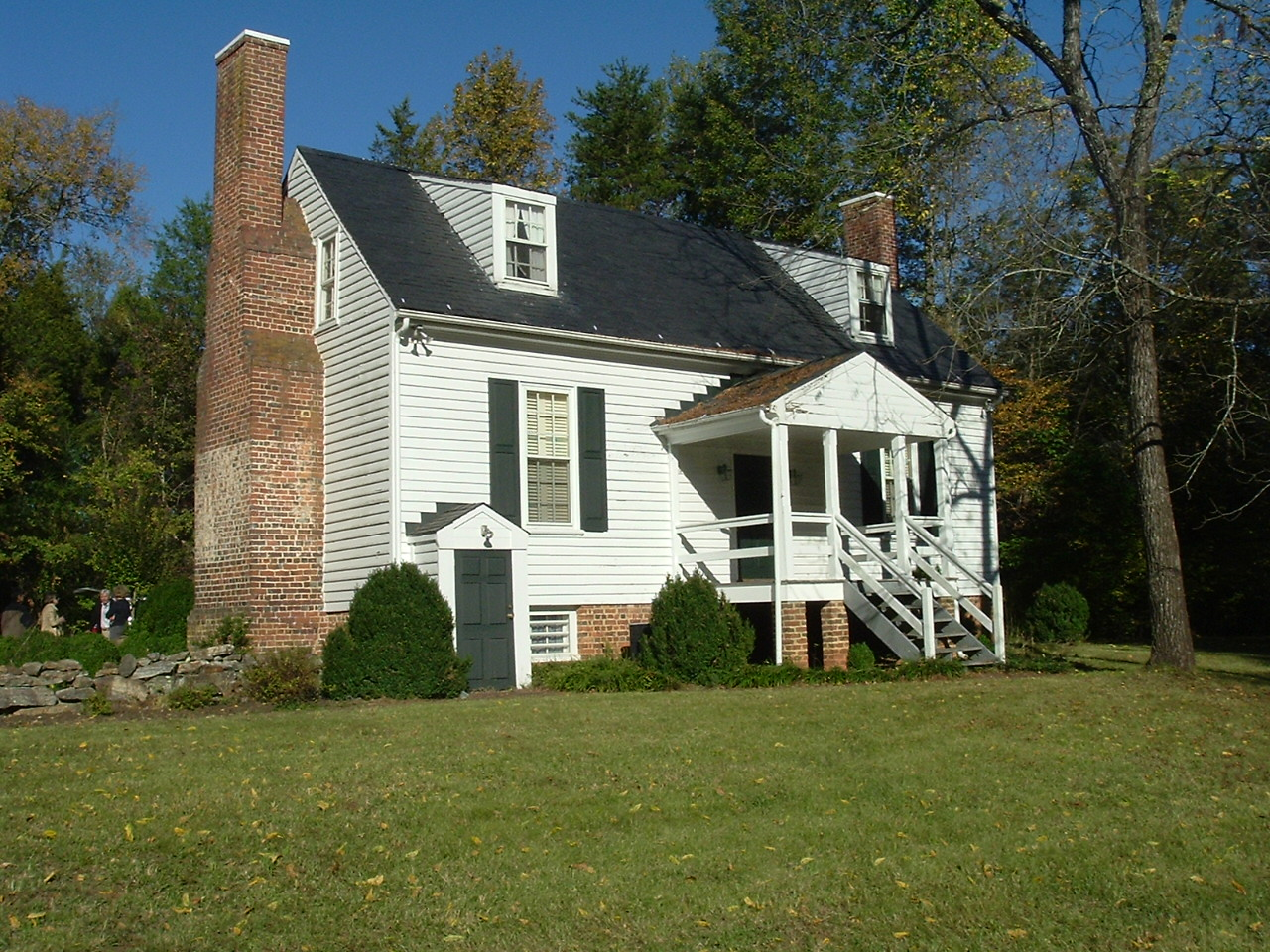
Locust Grove, a wood-frame example near Dillwyn, Virginia. Built prior to 1794.

The central-passage house was built much like the earlier hall and parlor house, except that its hall and parlor were divided by a central passageway. In fact, in many of the earliest examples a hall-parlor arrangement had a second partition added inside the existing structure or an additional room was added to one side to form a central-passage house. In form it was one-and-a-half storied, on a raised foundation, and had gable-end chimneys. Earlier examples were always one room deep (single-pile) and had a steeply pitched roof.

The single-pile eventually gave way to two-room-deep, or double-pile types and a more gentle-sloping roof with dormer windows by the end of the 18th century. Also, the earliest examples display some asymmetry, but this was quickly superseded by a strictly symmetrical facade. It usually employed the "double square" formula, that is, the house was twice as long as it was high. Timber-framed with weatherboarding and brick examples are known equally.

Stylistic elements that were typical of the type were massive bookend chimneys with rectangular caps, flat or segmented arches over door and window openings, and a raised, often molded brick, water table. When built with brick masonry load-bearing walls, decorative detailing often included Flemish bond and English bond. Diapering (diagonal diamond patterns done with darker brick) was also common on gable ends.
