= Union Hill School District =

School district in California, United States

Address
- 10879 Bartlett Drive Grass Valley, California, 95945; United States

District information
- Type: Public
- Grades: K–8
- NCES District ID: 0640380

Students and staff
- Students: 691
- Teachers: 33.62
- Staff: 34.29
- Student–teacher ratio: 20.55

Other information
- Website: www.unionhillschooldistrict.org

Union Hill School District is a school district near Grass Valley, California. It includes Union Hill Elementary School, approximately one mile outside Grass Valley's city limit, although a very small part of the district falls within the incorporated area of the City of Grass Valley. It is independent from Grass Valley School District, which lies within the city proper. It is approximately one mile northwest of Cedar Ridge.

Union Hill School is a California Distinguished School in 2000 and 2004. In addition to being a Kindergarten through Eighth Grade School (K-8), it also includes the Bearcat Discovery Center. David Curry and Joe Limov are the superintendent and principal, respectively, of the district and K-8 school.

The school mascot is the bearcat, but is represented with a cougar. The school colors are blue and gold. In 2007, the Eighth Grade Girls' Volleyball Team were the league champions. The school has three bands, three choirs, art programs, basketball, volleyball, and flag football teams. The district has an estimated 800 students.

The school was established in Union Hill, California, in 1868, as a one-room school.
