= Gravel Hill, Buckingham County, Virginia =

Unincorporated community in Virginia, United States

- Unincorporated community
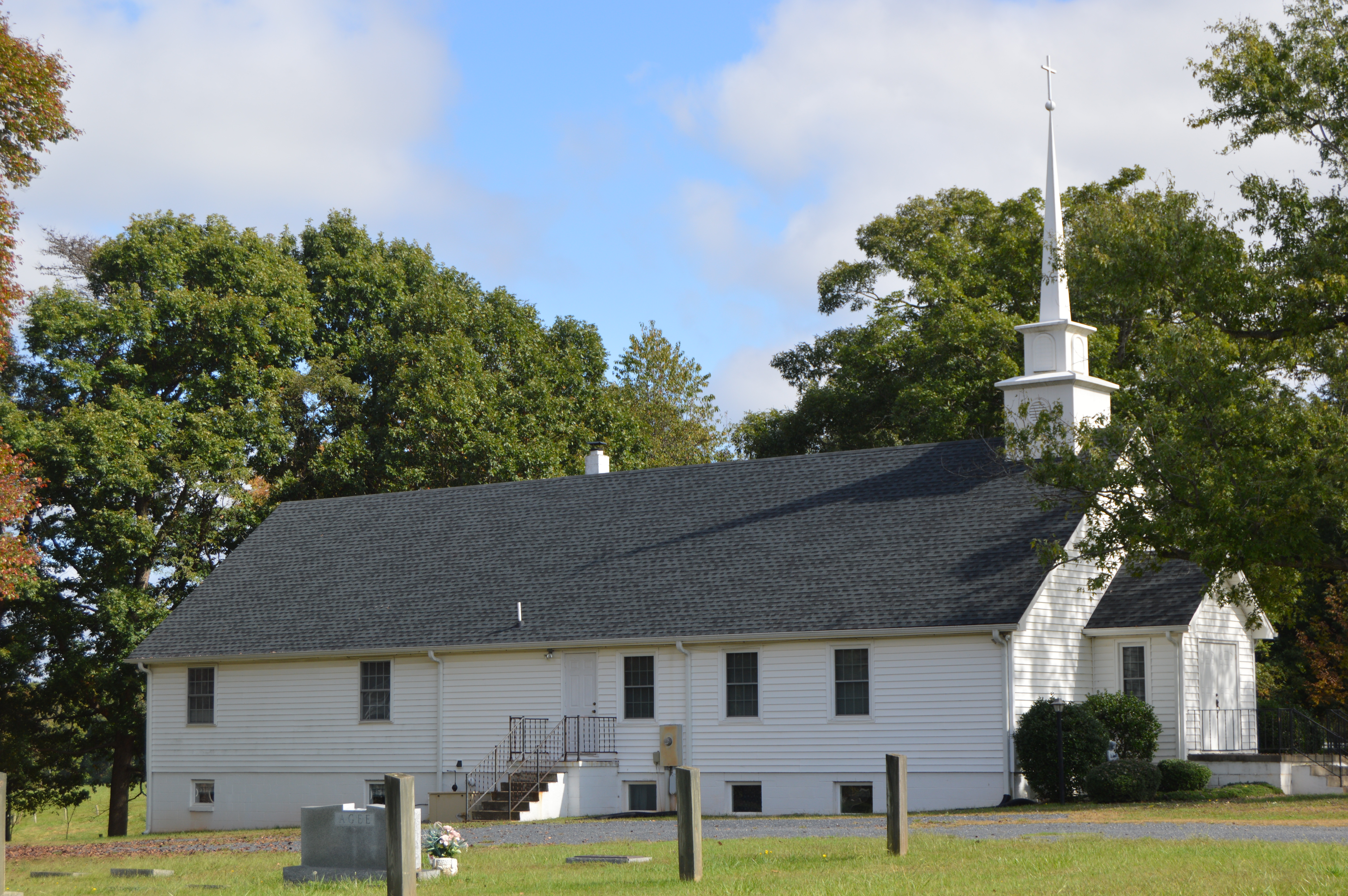
- Brown Chapel Methodist church

- Location within Virginia Location within the United States
- Coordinates: 37°35′03″N 78°22′29″W
- Country: United States
- State: Virginia
- County: Buckingham
- Elevation: 643 ft (196 m)
- Time zone: UTC-5 (Eastern (EST))
  - Summer (DST): UTC-4 (EDT)
- Area code: 434
- GNIS ID: 1493018

Gravel Hill is an unincorporated community in Buckingham County, in the U.S. state of Virginia.

The Buckingham Female Collegiate Institute Historic District was listed on the National Register of Historic Places in 1984.
