= Buckingham County, Virginia =

County in Virginia, United States

- County
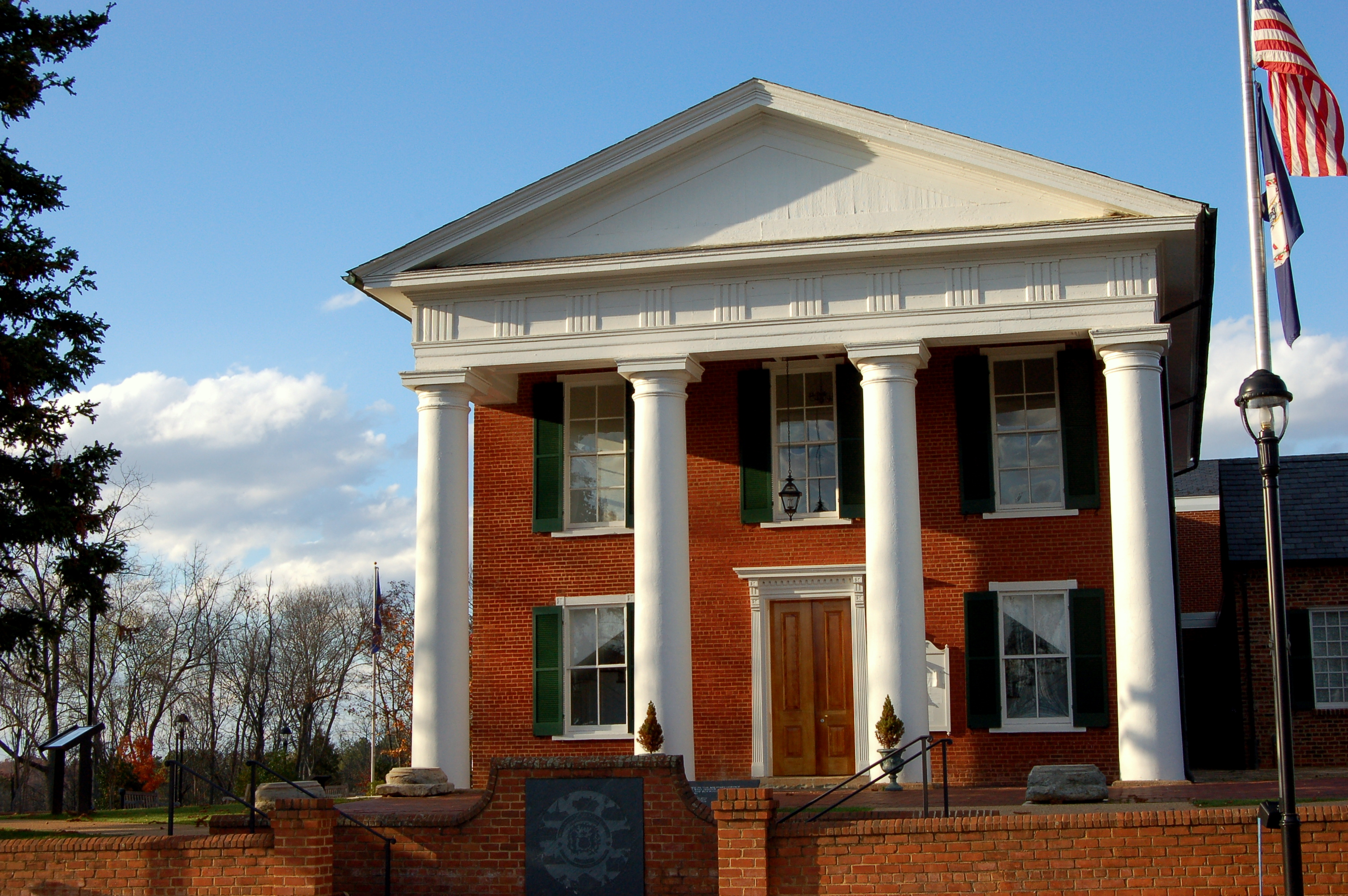
- Buckingham County Courthouse

- Flag Seal

- Location within the U.S. state of Virginia
- Coordinates: 37°34′N 78°32′W
- Country: United States
- State: Virginia
- Founded: 1761
- Named for: Duke of Buckingham
- Seat: Buckingham
- Largest town: Dillwyn

Area
  - Total: 584 sq mi (1,510 km^{2})
  - Land: 580 sq mi (1,500 km^{2})
  - Water: 3.9 sq mi (10 km^{2}) 0.7%

Population (2020)
  - Total: 16,824
  - Estimate (2025): 17,137 ▲
  - Density: 29/sq mi (11/km^{2})
- Time zone: UTC−5 (Eastern)
  - Summer (DST): UTC−4 (EDT)
- Congressional district: 5th
- Website: www.buckinghamcountyva.org

Buckingham County is a rural United States county located in the Commonwealth of Virginia, and containing the geographic center of the state. Buckingham County is part of the Piedmont region of Virginia, and the county seat is Buckingham Courthouse.

Buckingham County was created in 1761 from the southeastern portion of Albemarle County and was predominantly farmland. The county was probably named in honor of the Duke of Buckingham, though the precise origin is uncertain. Several changes were made to the borders, until the existing boundaries were established in 1860.

As of the 2020 census, the county population was 16,824.

== History ==
Buckingham County, lying south of the James River and in the Piedmont at the geographic center of the state, was established on May 1, 1761, from the southeastern portion of Albemarle County. The origin of the county name probably comes from the Duke of Buckingham (Buckinghamshire, England). Some sources say that the county was named for Archibald Cary's estate "Buckingham," which was located on Willis Creek. This is the only Buckingham County in the United States.

In 1778 a small triangular area bordering the James River was given to Cumberland County. In 1845, another part was taken from Buckingham to form the northern portion of Appomattox County. A final adjustment of the Appomattox-Buckingham county line was made in 1860, and Buckingham's borders then became fixed in their current form. A fire destroyed the courthouse (designed by Thomas Jefferson) in 1869, and most of the early records of this county were lost.

In the nineteenth century the county was settled more heavily by people migrating from the Tidewater area. It was devoted chiefly to plantations, worked by enslaved black Americans. These were converted from tobacco cultivation to mixed farming and pulpwood harvesting as the markets changed and the soil became exhausted from tobacco. These new types of uses required fewer slaves, and many were sold from the Upper South in the domestic slave trade to the Deep South, where cotton cultivation expanded dramatically in the antebellum period.

During the twentieth century, Joe Thompson bought the Buckingham Mill. In 1945 he put into place the long system of utilizing grain which used sifters as the grain was ground. Seven years later he added grain elevators. This was the last mill to make flour in Buckingham County and represents a time when America relied on small farms and small business owners.

In the 21st century, large tracts of land are held by companies such as WestVaco, which sell pulpwood and other timber products to the paper mills and wood product producers. It is still largely rural, with areas devoted to recreation such as fishing and hunting.

During the American Civil War, General Robert E. Lee's army marched through the county during his retreat on their way to surrender at Appomattox, Virginia. A marker in the cemetery of Trinity Presbyterian Church in New Canton reads:

According to the oral history of Trinity Presbyterian Church and this community, here are 45 Confederate and Union soldiers buried in mass graves directly behind this church. They left Appomattox after the surrender and headed for their homes north of here. Sick with disease, they died in a nearby camp. That they may not be forgotten, this plaque is placed by the Elliott Grays UDC Chapter #1877 2003.

In 2011, the county celebrated its 250th anniversary.

== Geography ==
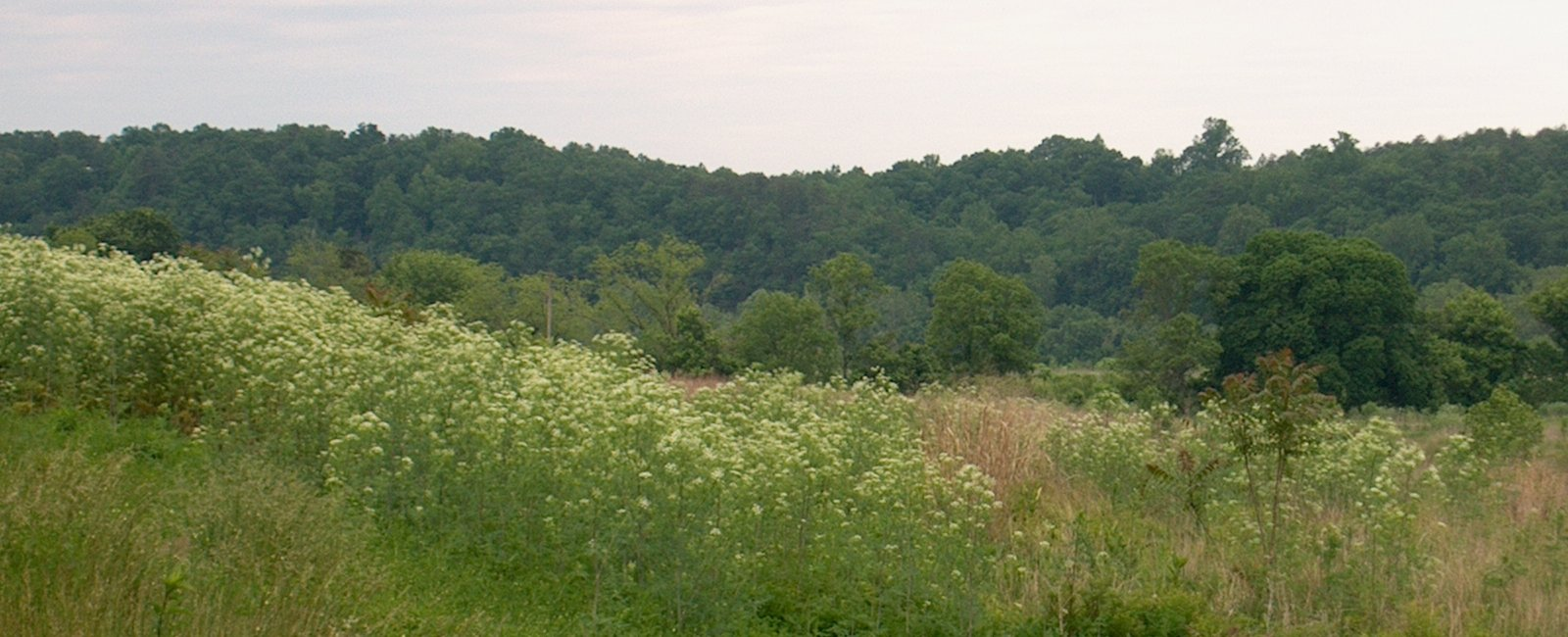
Buckingham County is rural and heavily forested.

According to the U.S. Census Bureau, the county has a total area of 584 square miles (1,510 km^{2}), of which 580 square miles (1,500 km^{2}) is land and 3.9 square miles (10 km^{2}) (0.7%) is water.

The geographical center of Virginia is located in Buckingham County, near the Mt. Rush community.

=== Adjacent counties ===
- Fluvanna County - northeast
- Cumberland County - east
- Prince Edward County - south
- Appomattox County - southwest
- Nelson County - west
- Albemarle County - northwest

=== Major highways ===
- US 15
- US 60
- SR 20
- SR 24
- SR 56

== Demographics ==
Historical population
Census	Pop.	Note	%±
1790	9,779		—
1800	13,389		36.9%
1810	20,059		49.8%
1820	17,569		−12.4%
1830	18,351		4.5%
1840	18,786		2.4%
1850	13,837		−26.3%
1860	15,212		9.9%
1870	13,371		−12.1%
1880	15,540		16.2%
1890	14,383		−7.4%
1900	15,266		6.1%
1910	15,204		−0.4%
1920	14,885		−2.1%
1930	13,315		−10.5%
1940	13,398		0.6%
1950	12,288		−8.3%
1960	10,877		−11.5%
1970	10,597		−2.6%
1980	11,751		10.9%
1990	12,873		9.5%
2000	15,623		21.4%
2010	17,146		9.7%
2020	16,824		−1.9%
2025 (est.)	17,137	▲	1.9%
U.S. Decennial Census; 1790-1960 1900-1990; 1990-2000 2010 2020

=== Racial and ethnic composition ===
Buckingham County, Virginia – Racial and ethnic composition Note: the US Census treats Hispanic/Latino as an ethnic category. This table excludes Latinos from the racial categories and assigns them to a separate category. Hispanics/Latinos may be of any race.
Race / Ethnicity (NH = Non-Hispanic)	Pop 1980	Pop 1990	Pop 2000	Pop 2010	Pop 2020	% 1980	% 1990	% 2000	% 2010	% 2020
White alone (NH)	6,682	7,551	9,184	10,494	10,314	56.86%	58.66%	58.79%	61.20%	61.31%
Black or African American alone (NH)	4,913	5,237	6,073	5,979	5,390	41.81%	40.68%	38.87%	34.87%	32.04%
Native American or Alaska Native alone (NH)	2	17	31	44	44	0.02%	0.13%	0.20%	0.26%	0.26%
Asian alone (NH)	16	27	27	63	59	0.14%	0.21%	0.17%	0.37%	0.35%
Native Hawaiian or Pacific Islander alone (NH)	x	x	1	1	0	x	x	0.01%	0.01%	0.00%
Other race alone (NH)	5	3	21	17	52	0.04%	0.02%	0.13%	0.10%	0.31%
Mixed race or Multiracial (NH)	x	x	160	260	552	x	x	1.02%	1.52%	3.28%
Hispanic or Latino (any race)	133	38	126	288	413	1.13%	0.30%	0.81%	1.68%	2.45%
Total	11,751	12,873	15,623	17,146	16,824	100.00%	100.00%	100.00%	100.00%	100.00%

=== 2020 census ===
As of the 2020 census, the county had a population of 16,824. The median age was 44.1 years. 19.0% of residents were under the age of 18 and 19.8% of residents were 65 years of age or older. For every 100 females there were 119.3 males, and for every 100 females age 18 and over there were 121.8 males age 18 and over.

The racial makeup of the county was 62.3% White, 32.3% Black or African American, 0.3% American Indian and Alaska Native, 0.4% Asian, 0.0% Native Hawaiian and Pacific Islander, 0.8% from some other race, and 3.8% from two or more races. Hispanic or Latino residents of any race comprised 2.5% of the population.

0.0% of residents lived in urban areas, while 100.0% lived in rural areas.

There were 5,991 households in the county, of which 28.0% had children under the age of 18 living with them and 29.7% had a female householder with no spouse or partner present. About 28.7% of all households were made up of individuals and 14.2% had someone living alone who was 65 years of age or older.

There were 7,133 housing units, of which 16.0% were vacant. Among occupied housing units, 73.8% were owner-occupied and 26.2% were renter-occupied. The homeowner vacancy rate was 1.9% and the rental vacancy rate was 4.9%.

=== 2010 census ===
As of the census of 2010, there were 17,146 people and 5,695 households residing in the county. The population density was 29.6 people per square mile (11.4 people/km^{2}). There were 7,294 housing units. The racial makeup of the county was 62.5% White, 35.1% Black or African American alone, 0.3% American Indian, 0.4% Asian, 1.7% Hispanic or Latino, and 1.6% from two or more races. 60.9% of the population identified as White Alone, not Hispanic or Latino.

The largest ancestry groups are listed as 18.7% American, 9.2% English, and 5.4% German. People of African American descent comprise 35.1% of the population, usually having European ancestry as well.

There were 5,965 households, out of which 26.3% had children under the age of 18 living with them, 48.1% were married couples living together, 15.3% had a female householder with no husband present, 5.6 had a male householder with no wife present, and 31.1% were non-families. 26.1% of all households were made up of individuals living alone. The average household size was 2.48 and the average family size was 2.95.

In the county, the population was spread out, with 19.2% under the age of 18, .6% from 20 to 24, 13% from 25 to 34, 22.8% from 35 to 49, and 22% from 50 to 64, and 14.3% who were 65 years of age or older. There were 9,493 males and 7,653 females. The median age was 41.7.

The median income for a household in the county was $36,378. Males had a median income of $36,420 versus $32,327 for females. The per capita income for the county was $16,938. About 21.1% of the population were below the poverty line.

In education, 38.2% of the population over age 25 graduated high school (or equivalent), 13.9% had some college, no degree, 3.8% hold an associate degree, 10.9% hold a bachelor's degree, and 10.9% hold a Graduate or Professional degree.

== Industry ==
=== Traditional sectors ===
Buckingham County's economy has historically been rooted in agriculture and forestry. Livestock—particularly beef and feeder cattle—constitute a large share of agricultural revenue, while hay and other feed crops support local farms. Timberland is a significant county resource, with large areas of privately owned forest contributing to local timber harvests and wood-related employment.

Other important employment sectors include construction, retail trade, and health care and social assistance.

=== Emerging: solar industry ===
Since the early 2020s, Buckingham County has become a focal point for utility-scale solar development. Several projects have been proposed, permitted, or constructed in the county, representing new investment in renewable energy infrastructure and changes to the county's land use profile.

Notable projects cited in local and regional coverage include smaller agrivoltaic projects and larger utility arrays. One reported facility, Black Bear Solar, was described in local reporting as adopting agrivoltaic practices, pairing solar arrays with beekeeping to support pollinators and compatible agricultural uses. Larger projects such as Riverstone Solar (reported to cover substantial acreage and produce on the order of tens to hundreds of megawatts) have also been reported in the regional press.

=== Controversies and regulatory issues ===
The expansion of industrial solar in Buckingham County has generated controversy and legal/regulatory scrutiny. Reported issues include environmental compliance failures, erosion and sediment control problems, and disputes over local land-use authority and permit conditions.

Some renewable energy companies operating in or near Buckingham have been subject to enforcement actions by the Virginia Department of Environmental Quality (DEQ) for violations such as failure to stabilize stormwater basins, sediment discharge, and inadequate site inspections. For example, enforcement actions and consent orders involving DEQ fines have been reported in local advocacy coverage. Reports indicate cumulative fines for multiple sites have been in the hundreds of thousands of dollars in some cases.

Local officials and residents have also expressed concern about the scale of some proposals, the adequacy of county inspection capacity, and whether state policy changes could affect local control over siting and acreage limits for industrial solar. Specific projects (for example, Riverstone Solar and proposals associated with companies such as Energix/Gabriel Solar) have faced public hearings, petitions, and scrutiny over compliance with permit conditions; local reporting has documented investigations and potential enforcement actions related to these concerns.

=== Economic and social impacts ===
Industrial solar development in Buckingham County has been framed by proponents as an opportunity to diversify the local tax base, create temporary construction jobs, and produce renewable energy. Some projects incorporating agrivoltaic practices have been presented as models for co-existence between solar generation and agricultural uses.

Critics emphasize environmental risks (such as erosion and impacts to water quality), long-term changes to rural landscapes, potential impacts on property values, and the burden placed on county staff for monitoring and enforcement. These debates have been a recurring feature of public hearings and local media coverage related to several Buckingham County solar projects.

== Government ==
=== County Administration ===
- County Administrator - Karl Carter

=== Board of Supervisors ===
- District 1: Carter Allen
- District 2: L. Cameron Gilliam
- District 3: Michael E. Palmore
- District 4: Paul W. Garrett
- District 5: Harry W. Bryant Jr.
- District 6: Joe N. Chambers Jr.-Chairman 2025
- District 7: Danny R. Allen-Vice Chairman 2025

=== Planning Commission ===
- District 1: John E. Bickford
- District 2: Ashley Shumaker
- District 3: Pete R. Kapuscinski
- District 4: J. D. Crews
- District 5: Steven Dorrier
- District 6: Joyce Gooden
- District 7: Calvin Bachrach
- Board of Supervisors Representative: Dennis Davis (D. 1)
- Zoning Administrator / Planner: Cheryl T. “Nicci” Edmondston

=== School Board ===
- District 1: David Christian
- District 2: Todd Jamerson
- District 3: Pamela P. Morris
- District 4: Joii W. Goodman
- District 5: Joseph Snoddy
- District 6: Maynard Ritchie
- District 7: Theresa D. Bryant
- Superintendent: Dr. Cynthia Reasoner

=== Constitutional officers ===
- Clerk of the Circuit Court: Justin Midkiff
- Commissioner of the Revenue: Stephanie Love (D)
- Commonwealth's Attorney: Kemper Beasley
- Sheriff: W.G. "Billy" Kidd, Jr. (I)
- Treasurer: Christy L. Christian (D)
- Chief of Police: None

=== State officials ===
- Luther Henry Cifers, III (R) Virginia Senate
- Tom Garrett (R) Virginia House of Delegates

=== Federal officials ===
John McGuire (R, VA-5) in the U.S. House of Representatives

United States presidential election results for Buckingham County, Virginia
Year	Republican		Democratic		Third party(ies)	
Year	No.	%	No.	%	No.	%
1912	97	11.98%	603	74.44%	110	13.58%
1916	181	22.24%	625	76.78%	8	0.98%
1920	311	29.28%	749	70.53%	2	0.19%
1924	213	25.03%	623	73.21%	15	1.76%
1928	579	49.15%	599	50.85%	0	0.00%
1932	204	18.72%	870	79.82%	16	1.47%
1936	273	22.38%	945	77.46%	2	0.16%
1940	289	25.73%	829	73.82%	5	0.45%
1944	286	28.26%	723	71.44%	3	0.30%
1948	354	27.94%	728	57.46%	185	14.60%
1952	811	46.58%	919	52.79%	11	0.63%
1956	751	43.64%	648	37.65%	322	18.71%
1960	765	44.37%	947	54.93%	12	0.70%
1964	1,547	56.60%	1,182	43.25%	4	0.15%
1968	1,027	32.05%	984	30.71%	1,193	37.23%
1972	2,107	62.86%	1,186	35.38%	59	1.76%
1976	1,487	39.57%	2,179	57.98%	92	2.45%
1980	1,864	47.51%	1,933	49.27%	126	3.21%
1984	2,627	57.36%	1,879	41.03%	74	1.62%
1988	2,481	55.49%	1,941	43.41%	49	1.10%
1992	2,368	46.40%	2,193	42.97%	542	10.62%
1996	1,974	40.70%	2,374	48.95%	502	10.35%
2000	2,738	50.20%	2,561	46.96%	155	2.84%
2004	3,185	52.85%	2,789	46.28%	53	0.88%
2008	3,428	49.01%	3,489	49.89%	77	1.10%
2012	3,569	47.86%	3,750	50.29%	138	1.85%
2016	3,950	54.15%	3,128	42.88%	217	2.97%
2020	4,544	55.92%	3,471	42.71%	111	1.37%
2024	4,847	61.16%	2,988	37.70%	90	1.14%

== Education ==
- Buckingham County High School
- Buckingham County Middle School
- Buckingham County Elementary School
- Buckingham County Primary School
- Buckingham Preschool
- Central Virginia Christian School
- Buckingham County Public Library

== Communities ==
=== Town ===
- Dillwyn

=== Census-designated places ===
- Buckingham Courthouse (Buckingham)
- Yogaville

=== Unincorporated communities ===
- Arvonia
- Mt. Rush
- New Canton
- Sprouses Corner
- Union Hill
- Glenmore

== Notable people ==
- Eugene Allen, Head Butler at the White House for 34 years.
- Brigadier General William Lewis Cabell, Confederate States of America Brigadier General, and three term Mayor of Dallas, Texas.
- Abraham Childers, Continental Army soldier and pioneer
- John Wayles Eppes, United States Senator, Virginia; member, United States House of Representatives, Virginia; member, Virginia House of Delegates; son-in-law of U.S. President Thomas Jefferson.
- Peter Francisco, American Revolutionary War hero.
- Randolph Jefferson, younger brother of U.S. President Thomas Jefferson.
- Satchidananda Saraswati (1922 – 2002), Indian spiritual teacher, helped bring yoga to America.
- Clarice Taylor, American stage, film, and television actress.
- Uncle John Scruggs, Blues musician.
- Carter G. Woodson, historian, founder of Black History Month, "Father of Black History."

== See also ==
- National Register of Historic Places listings in Buckingham County, Virginia
