= J. Maynard Magruder =

American politician

Member of the Virginia House of Delegates from the Arlington district
- In office 1944–1956
- Preceded by: n/a
- Succeeded by: William L. Winston

Personal details
- Born: James Maynard Magruder; February 9, 1900 Washington, D.C., U.S.
- Died: May 9, 1969 (aged 69) Norfolk, Virginia, U.S.
- Resting place: Columbia Gardens Cemetery; Arlington, Virginia, U.S.
- Party: Democratic
- Spouse(s): Elizabeth St. John, Dolores
- Education: University of Maryland; Georgetown University Law School

Military service
- Allegiance: United States
- Branch/service: United States Army
- Unit: 121st Engineering
- Battles/wars: World War I

James Maynard Magruder (February 9, 1900 – May 9, 1969) was an American real estate and insurance executive, as well as an attorney who served as a Democratic member of the Virginia House of Delegates representing Arlington County from 1944 to 1956.

== Early and family life ==
Magruder was born in Washington, D.C., on February 9, 1900. Educated in the Washington, D.C., public schools, Magruder graduated from the Business High School in 1918. He then entered Dowd's Army and Navy prep school in his hometown, then served in the U.S. Army during World War I. Magruder later served in the District National Guard and was commissioned a first lieutenant in the 121st Engineers, where he served until 1934. Magruder attended the University of Maryland, and later the Georgetown University Law School. He married Elizabeth Rita St. John, and after her death Dolores, who survived him.

== Career ==
In 1925, Magruder moved to Arlington, Virginia, and became involved in the real estate and insurance business through his own company. He was active in the Arlington County Democratic Committee and served as its chairman. He also became president of his local Lyon Village Civic Association and was that group's delegate to the Arlington Civic Federation. Magruder was also active in the local Chamber of Commerce (serving on its board of directors, and in 1963 on its national affairs committee), Lions Club, and in the Knights of Columbus. He was chairman of the county Ration Board and of the Arlington County Utilities Commission, as well as a director of the Shirlington Trust Company.

In 1943 Magruder became a candidate for the Virginia General Assembly as growing Arlington received an additional delegate after the 1940 census. He was re-elected to the part-time position five additional times, and eventually served as chairman of the House Counties, Cities and Towns committee, as well as on the federal relations, interstate cooperation, House expenses and banking and insurance committees. During his first term, Magruder served alongside fellow Byrd Organization loyalist Charles R. Fenwick, and after Fenwick's elevation to the state senate, for several terms alongside Republican George Damm (who declined to seek re-election in 1953).

Magruder and a group of investors started Arlington radio station WEAM, whose first sign-on was April 7, 1947; among the talent they recruited to WEAM was bandleader Jack Little. The Magruder group sold the station in 1948, and the station retained its call letters until 1984; since 1996 it has been WZHF.

In 1952, Magruder ran for the new 10th U.S. Congressional District seat, but was defeated in the Democratic primary by attorney and former county board chairman Edmund D. Campbell, who with his wife and school board chairwoman Elizabeth Campbell were known as opposing racial segregation. However, Campbell was narrowly defeated in the general election (by 322 votes in the Eisenhower landslide) by Republican real estate developer Joel Broyhill, who supported racial segregation and would be re-elected many times.

After the 1950 census reapportionment, growing Arlington received another additional delegate in the Virginia General Assembly, effective in 1953. Magruder polled highest in that election, and was joined by fellow Democrats C. Harrison Mann and Kathryn H. Stone, who outpolled all three Republican candidates.

Magruder declined to seek re-election in 1955 in order to run for Treasurer of Arlington County (one of 3 elected offices in the county), as the Massive Resistance crisis escalated. He and Arlington's state senator Charles R. Fenwick had been appointed to the Gray Commission, nominally designed to evaluate Virginia's response to the Brown v. Board of Education decisions of the U.S. Supreme Court, but Magruder was no longer a legislator by the time the commission's report was published. He was narrowly defeated (by 55 votes) for the treasurer position by the incumbent, Republican Colin C. MacPherson (who ended up serving another 4 terms). However, Democrats retained Magruder's legislative seat as William L. Winston was elected to serve alongside Mann and Stone (as again all Republican delegate candidates were outpolled).

In 1957, as the Byrd Organization tried to close Arlington's schools rather than allow their integration, Magruder unsuccessfully ran for a seat on the Arlington County Board (on which his wife Elizabeth had served in the 1940s). He lost to Herbert L. Brown Jr. by nearly 2500 votes, after which he stopped running for elective office. Earlier, Magruder served on the board of managers (and once served as chairman) of the Council of State Governments, and in 1958 was appointed to a seven-member Virginia advisory committee to the Civil Rights Commission.

== Death and legacy ==
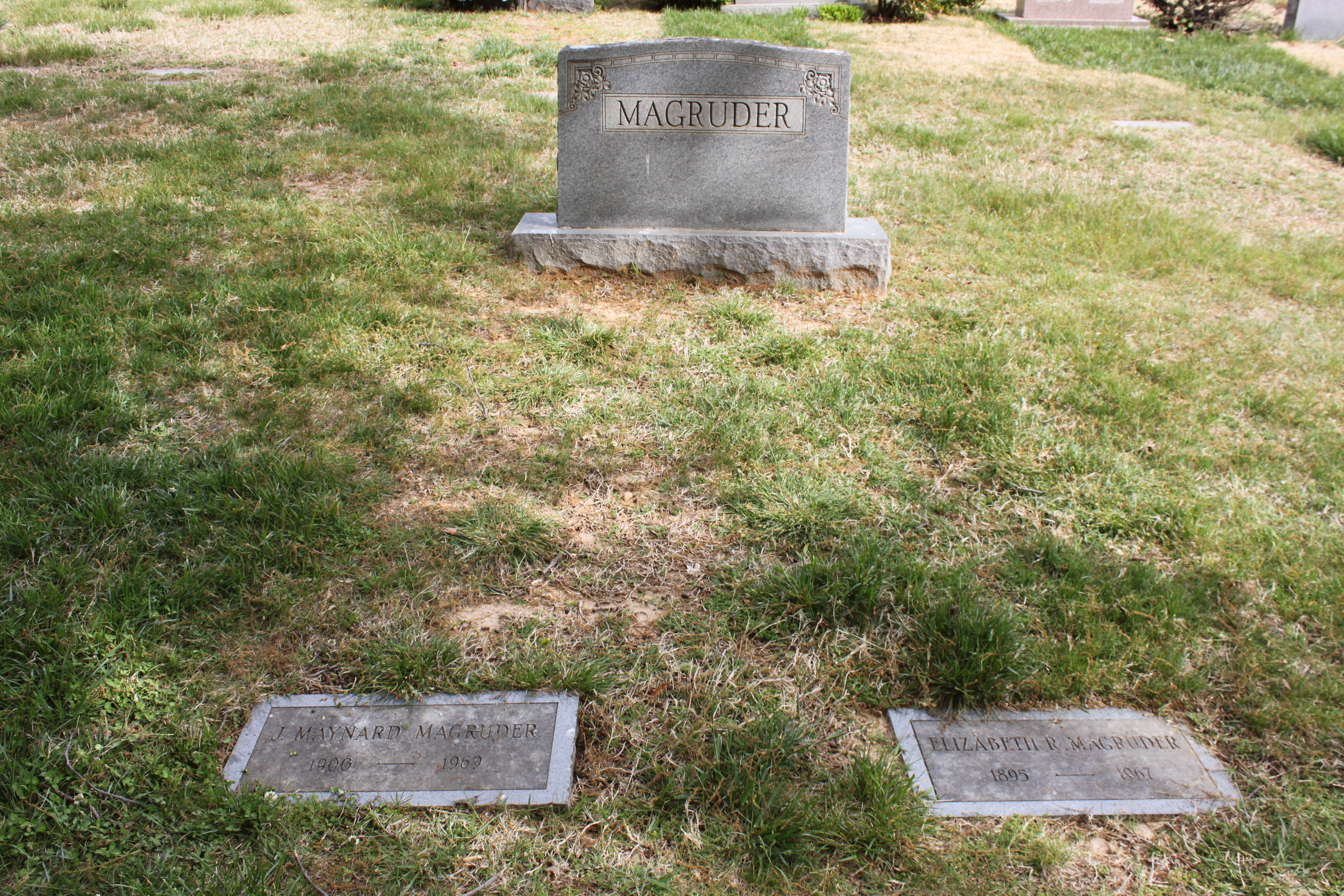
Grave of Magruder and his wife at Columbia Gardens Cemetery

Magruger died on May 9, 1969, in a hospital in Norfolk, Virginia, where he had suffered a heart attack while attending a meeting of the Virginia Chamber of Commerce. He is interred in the Columbia Gardens Cemetery in Arlington.

Virginia House of Delegates
Preceded by n/a	Representing Arlington County; 1946–1956	Succeeded by William L. Winston
