= John C. Webb =

American politician (1915–2000)

Member of the Virginia House of Delegates from Falls Church and Fairfax, Virginia
- In office January 13, 1954 – January 7, 1964
- Preceded by: Edwin W. Lynch
- Succeeded by: John L. Scott

Personal details
- Born: July 13, 1915 Washington, D.C., U.S.
- Died: March 24, 2000 (aged 84) Alexandria, Virginia, U.S.
- Party: Democratic
- Spouse: Harriet Shelton Rhinehardt
- Education: Washington College of Law

John Cobourn Webb (July 13, 1915 – March 24, 2000) was an American lawyer and Democratic politician who represented Falls Church and Fairfax, Virginia part-time in the Virginia House of Delegates from 1954 to 1966.

== Early life and family ==
John Webb was born in Washington D.C. to Martin Taylor Webb (1885-1970) and his wife, the former Lilie M. Cobourn (1882-1960). He received an LLM degree from the Washington College of Law. Webb married Harriet Shelton Rhinehardt and had several children.

He served in the U.S. Army's 11th Airborne Division in the Pacific Theater in World War II, and was active in the Freemasons.

== Career ==
After admission to the Virginia bar, Webb practiced in Fairfax County, Virginia. He also served as President of the Fairfax Bar Association, as well as was Chairman of the Board of the Bank of Annandale. He was also President of the McDonald Corporation of Hampton, Virginia and the McDonald Corporation of Norfolk, Virginia.

In 1953, Webb and Omer L. Hirst were elected to represent Falls Church and Fairfax in northern Virginia in the Virginia General Assembly, a part-time position. They replaced Edwin W. Lynch, who was the only delegate elected to represent fast-growing Fairfax between 1946 and 1951. Webb was soon embroiled in the Massive Resistance crisis whereby the Byrd Organization following the lead of U.S. Senator Harry F. Byrd refused to allow desegregation of Virginia's schools after the U.S. Supreme Court's decision in Brown v. Board of Education. Webb and fellow delegates Kathryn H. Stone of nearby Arlington and Republican Vernon S. Shaffer of Shenandoah County became the only three delegates to oppose all seven anti-NAACP laws contained in the Stanley Plan. Thus, Webb's was one of the few moderate voices during the special legislative session that ultimately adopted the Stanley Plan, portions of which were declared unconstitutional by both the Virginia Supreme Court and a three judge federal panel on January 19, 1959.

Hirst declined to seek reelection, and after a multi-candidate Democratic primary Dorothy S. McDiarmid, who ran against the Byrd Organization's school closing strategy and was elected (and Webb was re-elected) in November, 1959. Webb was again re-elected in 1961, although McDiarmid was temporarily defeated by Republican Glenn A. Burklund in that election.

Nearly a decade after his first electoral win, Webb (together with Stone and Senators C. Harrison Mann and John A. K. Donovan) became named plaintiffs in the reapportionment case ultimately decided (in Northern Virginia's favor) by the U.S. Supreme Court in Davis v. Mann. The case had been brought because after the 1960 census, the Byrd Organization refused to accord the fast-growing areas in northern Virginia representation in Virginia's General Assembly proportionate to the number of voters. Whereas Webb represented over 100,000 citizens, delegates from some districts in rural Southside Virginia represented only about 20,000 voters.

== Legacy ==
American University's Washington College of Law awards a scholarship in his name.

Virginia House of Delegates
| Preceded by Edwin W. Lynch | Virginia Delegate for Falls Church; 1954–1966 | Succeeded by John L. Scott |
