= Kathryn H. Stone =

American politician (1906–1995)

Kathryn Haesler Stone
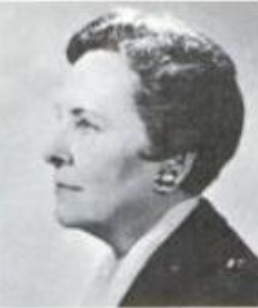
- Kathryn H. Stone, from a 1963 publication of the United States federal government

Member of the Virginia House of Delegates from Arlington
- In office 1954 – January 11, 1966
- Succeeded by: Mary A. R. Marshall

Personal details
- Born: Kathryn Haesler; October 5, 1906 Lisbon, Iowa, U.S.
- Died: May 18, 1995 (aged 88) Alexandria, Virginia, U.S.
- Party: Democratic
- Spouse: Harold H. Stone
- Children: 3
- Education: Cornell College; University of Iowa

Kathryn Haesler Stone (October 5, 1906 – May 18, 1995) was an American teacher, housewife, writer, civic activist and Democratic politician who represented Arlington, Virginia part-time in the Virginia House of Delegates from 1954 to 1966.

== Early and family life ==
Born in Lisbon, Iowa, Kathryn Haesler attended Cornell College in Mount Vernon, Iowa, and then the University of Iowa, which awarded her bachelor's and master's degrees in American history. She taught history and government at Menominie High School in Michigan, and later the University of Iowa's Lab School (1931-1933), and Merlaine Park Country Day School in New Orleans, Louisiana.

While in Louisiana in 1936, Haesler married then Department of Agriculture management engineer Harold A. Stone, and they later had a son (Paul) and two daughters (Suzanne and Joanne). The couple moved to northern Virginia in 1940, and lived in Arlington until the 1980s, when they moved to nearby Alexandria. She was active in the Beverley Hills Community Church in Alexandria, as well as various Parent Teacher Organizations, the American Association of University Women, Pi Lambda Theta and Delta Kappa Gamma.

== Career ==
She and her husband traveled extensively studying local governments in their spare time, as he worked in administrative positions in the Department of Agriculture and later the Department of the Army. The Stones were among the original 34 founders of Burgundy Farm Country Day School in Alexandria, Virginia, the first racially integrated school in Virginia. In 1940, Stone helped found the League of Women Voters chapter in Arlington. She wrote an organizational history of the League in 1949, and later served on its Virginia State Board and as vice-president of the National Board (1946-1950). As a member of the Northern Virginia Planning Commission (which evolved into the Metropolitan Washington Council of Governments, Stone helped design Reston, Virginia, and later wrote a history of that planned community. She also was active with the Commission on Human Resources of the Washington Center for Metropolitan Studies (serving as vice chairman), and the Tenth District Women's Democratic Club.

In 1954, Stone (who ran as a "housewife and mother") became the first woman elected to represent northern Virginia in the Virginia General Assembly, and the first woman to serve as a Virginia legislator in two decades. She took office months before the United States Supreme Court issued its first decision in Brown v. Board of Education. Her husband Harold was then working for the Department of the Army, and had previously worked as a volunteer to eliminate Arlington's appointed school board (temporarily succeeding in having it popularly elected).

Initially, Kathryn Stone's was one of the few Virginia voices advocating on behalf of civil rights and criticizing the Massive Resistance policies of the Byrd Organization as fostering a "spirit of lawlessness and disrespect for constitutional government." In addition to being the only woman in the Virginia General Assembly at the time, Stone was one of only two legislators with a background in education, and one of only nine legislators born outside the "Solid South". Arlington, which she represented, wanted to integrate its public schools as a result of an NAACP lawsuit against it, but Senator Harry F. Byrd and others (particularly from Southside Virginia) had taken away Arlington's elected school board and proposed to close any school or district that integrated, rather than allow that "local option." Stone specifically warned against a series of bills targeting the NAACP, telling fellow legislators "you are stooping in panic as you desert the Bill of Rights, which was born in the minds and hearts of the greatest Virginians." For this, the Defenders of State Sovereignty and Individual Liberties bought newspaper space to urge her defeat at the polls. In fact, she and delegates John C. Webb and Vernon S. Shaffer were the only three delegates to oppose all seven anti-NAACP bills in the segregationist Stanley Plan, with opposing votes never exceeding nine of the 100-member body.

On January 19, 1959 both a three-judge federal panel in Virginia and the Virginia Supreme Court held the Stanley Plan (various Virginia laws passed to undercut the U.S. Supreme Court's Brown I and Brown II rulings) unconstitutional. After Governor J. Lindsay Almond acceded to that judicial direction (much to Byrd's dismay), Arlington (and similarly accommodating Norfolk, Virginia) peacefully integrated their schools in early February.

Virginia also failed to correct the historic under-representation of the growing northern Virginia suburbs after the 1960 census (although Arlington had received one additional seat in the 1953 election, which Stone had won to be seated alongside J. Maynard Magruder and C. Harrison Mann). Stone became one of the four named plaintiffs, along with Mann (but not Magruder's successor William L. Winston) as well as with Fairfax state senator John A. K. Donovan and delegate Webb. in the voting apportionment case. The United States Supreme Court decided Davis v. Mann in 1964, ruling in their favor, and Arlington received an additional delegate in the House of Delegates after the required reapportionment, although Stone retired to pursue other interests as discussed below. Stone also served on President Kennedy's Commission on the Status of Women.

Throughout her part-time legislative career, Stone worked to improve youth services, mental health, education and welfare—all of which had received little funding in Virginia in previous decades. She introduced a bill establishing a minimum wage (which narrowly lost), as well as unsuccessful bills for state-wide compulsory schooling, a state conservation corps for unemployed youth, freedom of information, conflict of interest, open meetings and to eliminate the poll tax. After Dorothy Shoemaker McDiarmid of Fairfax and Marion Galland of Alexandria followed her into the House of Delegates, the three women proposed legislation to establish a State Commission on the Status of Women, which failed, but Governor Albertis S. Harrison Jr. established it anyway and made Stone a member. Stone was more successful in establishing the Virginia Community College System, as well as the Commonwealth's first regional juvenile detention home. In 1966, she declined to seek re-election in order to concentrate on her work as director of the Commission on Human Resources for the Washington Center for Metropolitan Studies, as Chairman of the Arlington Citizens Committee in President Lyndon B. Johnson's War on Poverty and a book tentatively titled "Human Resources: Focus in the Sixties." The Washington Post said she symbolized the change facing Virginia politics, as well as had become one of the Assembly's most influential members.

She was succeeded as delegate by Arlington's new Democratic chairwoman, Mary A. R. Marshall, who would serve 24 years in the General Assembly, and with Del. McDiarmid, update Virginia's laws, especially relating to women, children and senior citizens.

Stone wrote and published "Choosing the President of the USA" in 1954 and Reston, Virginia: Its Beginnings in 1965. She also, co-authored two books with her husband Harold A. Stone and Donald K. Price: City Manager Government in the U.S. (which went through many editions beginning in 1939) and Case Studies in City Manager Government.

== Death and legacy ==
Stone died at home in Alexandria on May 18, 1995, of complications after a stroke, and was survived by her husband, a son and two daughters. The Commission on the Status of Women posthumously named her a Person of Vision, which the General Assembly passed as House Joint Resolution No. 870 on February 15, 2001. Most of her papers, including two oral history interviews, are held in the special collections division of the University of Virginia. Some are held by the Iowa Women's Archives.

Virginia House of Delegates
Preceded by	Virginia Delegate for Arlington; 1954–1966; Served alongside: C. Harrison Mann	Succeeded by Mary A. R. Marshall
