= Vernon S. Shaffer =

American politician (1884–1958)

Member of the Virginia House of Delegates from Shenandoah County, Virginia
- In office January 1950 – May 3, 1958
- Preceded by: William C. Lambert
- Succeeded by: Wilbur O. Riley

Personal details
- Born: February 20, 1884 Page County, Virginia, U.S.
- Died: May 3, 1958 (aged 74) Woodstock, Virginia, U.S.
- Party: Republican
- Spouse: Mary Leah Stover (m. 1909)

Vernon Spitler Shaffer (February 20, 1884 – May 3, 1958) was an American farmer and Republican politician who represented Shenandoah County in the Virginia House of Delegates from 1950 until his death in 1958.

== Early and family life ==
Shaffer was born in Page County, Virginia, and educated in its public schools. He married Mary Leah Stover in 1909 and they lived in Maurertown, Virginia, in the Shenandoah Valley region. They had three children. Vernon Shaffer (aka V.S.) was raised in the Brethren Church tradition and joined his spouse, Leah, as a member of the Primitive Baptist Church.

== Career ==
A chicken farmer and a Republican, Shaffer was president of the Shenandoah Commercial Hatchery, Inc. As a member of the Virginia House of Delegates, he served on the Virginia World War II Memorial Commission and the Gray Commission (appointed by Gov. Stanley to make recommendations concerning public school integration). His eldest son William Robert Shaffer of Woodstock, Virginia, represented Shenandoah County in the House of Delegates from 1942 until 1947, when fellow Republican (and poultry dealer) William C. Lambert took over for a term. His younger son John David Shaffer continued the family business and civic traditions.

Shenandoah County voters elected Vernon S. Shaffer their delegate to the Virginia General Assembly in November 1949. He assumed that office in January. He was re-elected in 1951, 1953, 1955 and 1957. During his last three terms, the Massive Resistance crisis embroiled Virginia because the Byrd Organization (to which most state Democrats belonged, unofficially) followed the lead of U.S. Senator Harry F. Byrd, opposing desegregation of Virginia's schools despite the U.S. Supreme Court's decisions in Brown v. Board of Education in 1954 and 1955. Although greatly outnumbered by Democrats (especially Byrd Democrats), Shaffer's and "Mr. Republican" state senator Ted Dalton's voices were among the few moderates during the 1956 legislative session that did not support an interposition resolution (a political maneuver that interposed the will of the State between the citizens of Virginia and the federal Supreme Court). Later in the special legislative session of 1956, the General Assembly ultimately adopted the Stanley Plan.

By 1956, the Byrd Organization Stanley Plan proposed to close all schools that integrated. Shaffer and Democratic (but anti-Byrd) delegates Kathryn H. Stone of Arlington (which had also decided to integrate) and John C. Webb of Fairfax (another then fast-growing suburb of Washington, D.C.) became the only three delegates to oppose all seven anti-NAACP laws also contained in the Stanley Plan.

== Death and legacy ==
Shaffer died on May 3, 1958.

On January 19, 1959, both the Virginia Supreme Court in Harrison v. Day and a three judge federal panel declared parts of the Stanley Plan unconstitutional, and just over four years later the United States Supreme Court would declare the anti-NAACP laws unconstitutional in NAACP v. Button. Fellow Republican Wilbur O. Riley replaced Shaffer for the remainder of his term. However, W. Howard Ellifrits, a Republican banker who had served as elected Court Clerk of Shenandoah County (a position similar to many Byrd Democrats), won election as Shenandoah county's delegate in the next general election in 1959.

Virginia House of Delegates
Preceded by William C. Lambert	Virginia Delegate for Shenandoah County; 1950–1958	Succeeded by Wilbur O. Riley
