= Dorothy Shoemaker McDiarmid =

American politician (1906–1994)

Dorothy S. McDiarmid

Member of the Virginia House of Delegates from Fairfax
- In office January 13, 1960 – January 9, 1962
- Preceded by: Omer L. Hirst
- Succeeded by: Glenn A. Burklund

Member of the Virginia House of Delegates from Fairfax
- In office January 8, 1964 – January 13, 1970
- Preceded by: Glenn A. Burklund
- Succeeded by: Byron F. Andrews Jr.

Member of the Virginia House of Delegates from Fairfax
- In office January 12, 1972 – January 10, 1989
- Preceded by: Byron F. Andrews Jr.
- Succeeded by: Richard L. Fisher

Personal details
- Born: October 22, 1906 Waco, Texas, U.S.
- Died: June 8, 1994 (aged 87) Fairfax, Virginia, U.S.
- Party: Democratic
- Spouse: Norman Hugh MacDiarmid
- Children: Mary, Robert
- Education: Swarthmore College

Dorothy Shoemaker McDiarmid (October 22, 1906 – June 8, 1994) was a teacher, real estate broker, Quaker activist, and Virginia legislator for nearly 26 years.

== Early and family life ==
Born in Waco, Texas to U.S. Department of Agriculture employee Daniel Naylor Shoemaker and his wife Frances Hartley, Dorothy Shoemaker was raised in the Washington D.C. metropolitan area (where her parents helped found the Florida Avenue Friends Meeting). She later remembered attending women's suffrage parades in which her mother marched. She attended Central High School, then Swarthmore College in Pennsylvania, from which she graduated with a bachelor's degree in political science in 1929. Her family had roots in Loudoun County, Virginia, ancestors having attended the Goose Creek meeting.

In 1932, Dorothy married fellow Swarthmore graduate Norman Hugh ("Mac") McDiarmid (1907–1993), and their marriage lasted 61 years until his death. Beginning in 1939, they lived on a 50-acre farm between Vienna, Virginia and Reston, Virginia.

== Career ==
Dorothy McDiarmid taught school at the Sidwell Friends School for a time, as well as in northern Virginia. She was active in the Parent Teacher Association (becoming President of the Fairfax County federation chapter and uniting the white and black PTAs) as well as the League of Women Voters, Democratic Women's Club, Boy Scouts and Vienna community activities while raising their children. She and her husband "Mac" were partners in McDiarmid Realty and McDiarmid Associates.

== Political career ==
In 1959, she ran for the General Assembly (a part-time position) to oppose the Byrd Organization's plan of Massive Resistance to the United States Supreme Court decisions in Brown v. Board of Education, which included a Prince Edward County, Virginia case. Governor Thomas Stanley, following the direction of U.S. Senator Harry F. Byrd proposed to close any school or district that integrated, even those integrating under court order, as in nearby Arlington as well as Norfolk and Albemarle County.

McDiarmid championed public schools, as well as improved services for children and women and distribution of state budget monies according to population. Several newspaper surveys ranked her among the ten most effective delegates. McDiarmid succeeded in adding kindergarten to the public school schedule, as well as helping create George Mason University and five community colleges in Northern Virginia. Early in her political career, she proposed Virginia's creation of a Committee on the Status of Women, which was defeated legislatively, but established as an executive branch committee by Governor Albertis S. Harrison Jr. McDiarmid also advocated ratification of the Equal Rights Amendment to the U.S. Constitution and abolition of the death penalty, but her Virginia General Assembly colleagues never passed those measures (although the 1970 Virginia constitution does include an equal rights section).

Although temporarily defeated for re-election in 1961 and 1969 (as discussed below), McDiarmid became one of the most influential women ever elected to the House of Delegates. She was the first woman appointed to the Committee on Rules, ranking member of the House Education Committee, and from 1986 until her retirement, she became the first woman to preside over the committee that prepared the state's budget (the House Committee on Appropriations).

After retiring from the General Assembly, McDiarmid served as vice chair of the Governor's Commission on Educational Opportunity for All Virginians. During her lifetime, McDiarmid won the PTA's Lifetime member achievement award, the first annual award of the Fairfax County Human Rights Commission, and the Fairfax County Woman of Achievement Award (1971, 1972). She also received the Outstanding Virginian award in 1989 and the George Mason medal (a lifetime achievement award) from the George Mason University Board of Visitors in 1990.

Due to the redistricting issue eventually resolved by the Supreme Court in Davis v. Mann, Fairfax County only had two delegates in the 1961 election, and Democrat John C. Webb (another named plaintiff in Davis v. Mann, with Arlington's C. Harrison Mann) and one-term Republican Glenn A. Burklund outpolled McDiarmid, who thus lost her seat until again elected two years later. In the Republican landslide of 1969, Republicans Vincent F. Callahan Jr., Warren E. Barry, David A. Sutherland and Byron F. Andrews Jr., and Democrat Clive L. DuVal II outpolled McDiarmid for the five seats allowed Fairfax County. She defeated Andrews in 1971 and 1973. Following the 1972 election, Callahan was appointed to the Appropriations Committee on which McDiarmid also served (and chaired from 1986 until her retirement in 1989); Callahan would later also chair that powerful committee. Complicating matters somewhat, before the 1960 census, delegate districts were not numbered. Following the 1970 census, both she and Callahan were delegates from the 18th House district, and other sections of Fairfax were in the 19th House district, which had 3 delegates. Following the 1980 census, McDiarmid represented the 35th Delegate district and Callahan the 34th. Other house districts including portions of Fairfax County included the 33rd and 36th through 47th, although some of the districts above the 42nd also included parts of the Cities of Alexandria and Arlington. After McDiarmid announced her retirement in 1989, David A. Battaglia won the Democratic primary to succeed her, but lost to Republican real estate developer Richard L. Fisher in the November general election.

== Death and legacy ==
McDiarmid died of a heart attack at Inova Fairfax Hospital on June 9, 1994, within a year after her beloved husband Mac's death, though survived by their children and grandchildren. Her memorial service at the Washington Friends Meeting featured many accounts of her gentleness and strength. She and her husband are buried at the Goose Creek burying ground in Loudoun County, Virginia.

Her papers are in the George Mason University special collections, and are being indexed. In 2015, the Library of Virginia honored her service as one of its Virginia Women in History. In 2004, her neighbors in the Ayr Hill Garden Club of Vienna, Virginia established a children's garden and named it in her honor. In 2018 the Virginia Capitol Foundation announced that McDiarmid's name would be on the Virginia Women's Monument's glass Wall of Honor.

Virginia House of Delegates
Preceded by Omer L. Hirst	Virginia Delegate for Fairfax; 1960–1962, 1964–1970, 1972–1989; Served alongside: John C. Webb	Succeeded by Richard L. Fisher
