= Omer L. Hirst =

American politician (1915–2003)

Member of the Virginia Senate from the Fairfax, Virginia district
- In office January 8, 1964 – January 8, 1980
- Preceded by: John A. K. Donovan
- Succeeded by: Richard L. Saslaw

Member of the Virginia House of Delegates from the Falls Church and Fairfax, Virginia district
- In office January 13, 1954 – January 12, 1960
- Preceded by: Edwin Lynch
- Succeeded by: Dorothy S. McDiarmid

Personal details
- Born: August 30, 1913 Annandale, Virginia, U.S.
- Died: July 29, 2003 (aged 89) Arlington, Virginia, U.S.
- Party: Democratic
- Spouse(s): Ann Palmer; Nancy Hand
- Education: Washington and Lee University

Omer Lee Hirst (July 13, 1915 – July 29, 2003) was an American real estate broker, investor and Democratic politician who represented Falls Church and Fairfax, Virginia part-time in the Virginia House of Delegates from 1954 to 1959. He later represented Annandale and Fairfax in the Virginia Senate, from 1964 to 1979.

== Early and family life ==
Omer Hirst was born in Annandale, Virginia, to Thomson Mason Hirst III and Edna Mae Bennett. His father farmed chickens, long before the area became a suburb of nearby Washington, D.C. He graduated in 1930 from Lee-Jackson High School in Alexandria, and received a B.S. degree in commerce in 1936 from Washington and Lee University, and was invited to join the Phi Beta Kappa society. He married Ann Palmer, and they had three children but later divorced. He married Nancy Hand in 1972, and she survived him.

He served as a lieutenant in the U.S. Marines during World War II, and upon returning to Virginia was active in his Methodist Church, as well as the Lions, American Legion, Marine Corps League, Fairfax Historical Society, Boy Scouts, Fairfax High School Parent Teacher Association and various business and community associations in his native Annandale.

== Career ==
After graduating from college, Hirst reluctantly joined his father's real estate business, and later came to live in McLean, Virginia. In 1938, the Fairfax Chamber of Commerce put him on a committee to develop a county mapping system and update land records. As a smart and reserved real estate investor in residential, industrial and commercial property, Hirst became rich. His companies, Omer L. Hirst Inc., and O.C. Builders Inc. developed Landmark Shopping Center, the first three-department-store shopping mall in the area. First American Bank, a local bank he founded in Herndon (and on whose board of directors he served for two decades) later merged with the Arlington Trust Company, and then into Wachovia Bank.

A "Roosevelt Democrat", Hirst was active in local politics, and Fairfax County's transition from a rural form of government to a county executive system. In 1953, he and John C. Webb were elected to represent Falls Church and Fairfax in northern Virginia in the Virginia General Assembly, a part-time position. They replaced Edwin Lynch, who was the only delegate elected to represent fast-growing Fairfax County between 1946 and 1951. Both often criticized the Byrd Organization, which considered them "Young Turks" for actions such as Hirst's attempt to repeal the poll tax. He and Webb were soon embroiled in the Massive Resistance crisis whereby U.S. Senator Harry F. Byrd fought desegregation of Virginia's schools despite the U.S. Supreme Court's decision in Brown v. Board of Education. After both the Virginia Supreme Court and a three judge federal panel on January 19, 1959, massive resistance became more passive, but Hirst declined to seek re-election. Fellow real estate broker Dorothy S. McDiarmid, who ran against the Byrd Organization's school closing strategy, won the Democratic primary and was elected in November, 1959.

In 1963, Hirst ran for the Virginia state senate seat. He was elected, and re-elected in 1965, 1967, 1971, and 1975. By the time he retired, Hirst had become the third most senior state senator, and chairman of the Privileges and Elections Committee. Although Hirst had not joined Webb and John A. K. Donovan) as named plaintiffs in the reapportionment case ultimately decided (in Northern Virginia's favor) by the U.S. Supreme Court in Davis v. Mann (1963), he later worked on reapportionments in its aftermath, as well as subsequent censuses.

Two of his legislative priorities were education and roads. Hirst helped create George Mason University Law School as well as enable the university to award graduate degrees, and served on its board of directors for 13 years. His wife also served on the university's board of visitors from 1983 to 1991 and later on the College of Arts and Sciences Advisory Board. Hirst also extended Interstate 66 inside the Capital Beltway and helped create the Dulles Toll Road, which officially is named after him and fellow legislator Adelard Brault. Hirst chaired the Senate Welfare Committee (1968–1971), which recommended reforms adopted in 1970, and the Commission on Mental, Indigent and Geriatric Patients (1972–79). He helped pass a liquor by the drink law, which allowed Virginia restaurants to serve alcoholic beverages. Hirst declined to seek re-election in 1979 and was replaced by Richard L. Saslaw in 1980.

== Death ==
Hirst died of natural causes at what became Virginia Hospital Center in Arlington at age 89.

Virginia House of Delegates
Preceded by Edwin W. Lynch	Virginia Delegate for Falls Church; 1954–1959	Succeeded by Dorothy S. McDiarmid
Senate of Virginia
Preceded by John A. K. Donovan	Virginia Senator for Fairfax District; 1964–1980	Succeeded by Richard L. Saslaw
