= John A. K. Donovan =

American politician (1907–1993)

Member of the Virginia Senate from the 29 district
- In office January 9, 1952 – January 7, 1964
- Preceded by: Andrew W. Clarke
- Succeeded by: Omer L. Hirst; Robert C. Fitzgerald

Personal details
- Born: June 23, 1907 Edgewood, Rhode Island
- Died: January 1, 1993 (aged 85) Arlington, Virginia
- Party: Democratic
- Spouse: Mary Virginia Donovan
- Children: Anne Larson, Mary Mulhern
- Education: Georgetown University; George Washington University
- Occupation: Dog breeder, author
- Profession: Attorney

John Amadeus Kiernan Donovan (June 23, 1907 – January 1, 1993) was an attorney, writer, dog breeder and Virginia Democratic politician who served part-time in the Virginia Senate representing Fairfax County from 1952 until 1964.

== Early life and education ==
Born in Edgewood, Rhode Island, Donovan's family (he also had 3 sisters) moved to the Washington, D.C., metropolitan area when John was a child. He was educated at Gonzaga College High School, Georgetown University and the George Washington University, receiving both an LLM and LLB. He married Mary Virginia McCarthy, and they had two daughters.

== Career ==
Donovan practiced law in Virginia from 1933 until 1983, when he retired but continued to do legal work out of his home and remained active in his community. Donovan moved to Falls Church, Virginia, in 1941 and served as the town attorney in the 1940s. He later proudly called himself the nuttiest trial lawyer in Virginia.

He was active in the American Bar Association, the American Judicature Society and Virginia Bar Association, as well as in his local Lions club (serving as District Governor and State Parliamentarian). Active in his local Catholic church, St. James Catholic Church in Falls Church, as well as the Knights of Columbus and Eagles, Donovan was made a knight of the order of St. Sylvester by Pope Pius XII. In 1956 the Catholic War Veterans named Donovan their Catholic layman of the year.

Donovan and his wife bred Irish Wolfhounds and Donovan served as president of the Old Dominion Kennel Club. With the assistance of their daughter's Anne's illustrations, Donovan published several books about dogs, mostly through the local publisher, Denlinger:

- You and your Irish Wolfhound (Fairfax, Virginia: Denlinger, 1976)
- Gaelic names for Celtic dogs (with William Watson Denlinger) (Fairfax, Virginia: Denlinger, 1980)
- The Dogs in Shakespeare (Fairfax, Virginia: Denlinger 1980)
- The Dog in Philosophy (Fairfax, Virginia: Denlinger, 1985)
- The Irish Wolfhound – great symbol of Ireland (Loveland, Colorado, Alpine Publ. 1986)
- The Story of the Dog - A Compendium (West End Printing Company, Falls Churchm VA, 1985)
- Dog in Sports (Fairfax, Virginia: Denlinger 1988)
- The Dogs Found in the Writings of Charles Dickens (Fairfax, Virginia: Denlinger 1989)
- Dogs in the Writings of Rudyard Kipling (Fairfax, Virginia: Denlinger 1991)

== Political career ==
Donovan represented Falls Church, Fairfax County and surrounding areas in the state senate for three terms, 1952-1964, during the period of Massive Resistance as well as the growth of the northern Virginia suburbs of Washington, D.C. The district was initially numbered the 29th, and included Prince William County and Alexandria from Donovan's original election in 1951 until the 1955 election. Donovan's core Falls Church and Fairfax area was reformulated for that election as the 28th District when growing Northern Virginia received some additional representation. During his legislative service, Donovan also served as Chairman of the Interstate Potomac River Basin Commission.

After the 1960 census documented additional growth in northern Virginia which the Virginia legislature's redistricting barely addressed, in April 1962 Donovan joined with fellow Fairfax County politician John C. Webb, as well as C. Harrison Mann and Kathryn H. Stone of neighboring Arlington County. All four broke with the Byrd Organization and challenged the gross under-representation of Northern Virginia (for example some rural districts had one delegate per 20,000 residents but Fairfax County's two delegates each represented 143,000 people). A three-judge federal panel decided in their favor on November 28, 1962, but the state appealed. The United States Supreme Court eventually decided in their favor on June 15, 1964, in Davis v. Mann.

The 1962 redistricting (which was still in effect in the 1963 election) moved the 29th senatorial district to cover Prince William County, rather than Fairfax County, and renumbered the core of the old district covering Fairfax County and Falls Church as the 27th District. Like fellow state Senator, Armistead Boothe, Donovan declined to seek re-election. Omer L. Hirst and Robert C. Fitzgerald were elected as Fairfax's dual senators, defeating John K. Lally and William G. Downey in the primary.

Donovan never again held elective office, but continued his legal practice, as well as again became a statewide representative of the Lions Club in that national (and international) organization.

== Death and memorials ==
Donovan died on New Year's Day, 1993 at Arlington Hospital in Arlington, having suffered from diabetes and cancer. He was survived by his wife and daughters, and donated his precious Irish books to his alma mater, Georgetown University.

Senate of Virginia
Preceded by Andrew W. Clarke	Virginia Senate, District 29; 1952–1964	Succeeded by Omer L. Hirst
