= George Lovelace =

American politician (1936–2020)

Member of the Virginia House of Delegates from the 35th district
- In office January 1, 1997 – January 14, 1998
- Preceded by: Richard L. Fisher
- Succeeded by: Jeannemarie Devolites

Personal details
- Born: September 18, 1936 Evansville, Indiana, U.S.
- Died: March 22, 2020 (aged 83) Locust Grove, Virginia, U.S.
- Party: Democratic
- Spouse: Donalda M. Lovelace
- Children: Dawn Klemann and Donalda L. Lovelace
- Education: Lincoln University; George Washington University

George Earl Lovelace (September 18, 1936 – March 22, 2020) was a United States Army officer and politician. He was a member of the town council of Vienna, Virginia for 21 years, and a member of the Virginia House of Delegates for 1 year. He was the first African American member of the Virginia General Assembly elected in Northern Virginia since Reconstruction.

== Education and military career ==
Lovelace graduated from Lincoln University in 1958 with a bachelor's degree in physics. He then served in the US Army's Signal Corps until his retirement in 1979 at the rank of Lieutenant colonel. Additionally, Lovelace received a master's degree from George Washington University.

== Political career ==
Lovelace was first elected to the Vienna, Virginia town council in 1982, serving until 1996. In November 1996, incumbent state delegate Richard L. Fisher resigned mid-term, triggering a December special election. Lovelace was the Democratic nominee for the remainder of the term, facing Republican Mike Polychrones, a former legislative aide to Fisher. Lovelace prevailed by a 51% to 45% margin. In the 1997 general election, Lovelace was defeated by Republican candidate Jeannemarie Devolites by a 51% to 47% margin. Lovelace ran for the seat again in the 1999 election and was defeated again.

From 2003 to 2010 Lovelace again served on the Vienna town council. Lovelace was also an at large board member of the Fairfax County Park Authority from 2004 onwards. In 2006 Lovelace unsuccessfully challenged incumbent Vienna mayor M. Jane Seeman. The race centered largely on stylistic issues over policy concerns, with both candidates agreeing to enforce Vienna's zoning rules and monitor new housing developments around the town.

Lovelace retired from the Vienna town council in 2010, and was honored by a Virginia General Assembly Joint Resolution in 2011. He died from lung cancer in Locust Grove, Virginia on March 22, 2020.

== Personal life ==
Lovelace first wife Elizabeth Richards Lovelace died in 1989 one child was born from this union Dawn Lovelace Klemann. He married Donalda Mosby Lovelace in 1991 and he adopted Donalda Lee Lovelace. He was a devout Catholic and a n retirement continued with his service with the Lake of the Woods Lions Club.
