= Scull v. Virginia ex rel. Committee on Law Reform & Racial Activities =

Scull v. Virginia ex rel. Committee on Law Reform and Racial Activities
- Supreme Court of the United States

Argued November 18, 1958 Decided May 4, 1959
- Full case name: Scull v. Virginia ex rel. Committee on Law Reform & Racial Activities
- Citations: 359 U.S. 344 (more) 79 S.Ct. 838; 3 L. Ed. 2d 865; 1959 U.S. LEXIS 1762

Case history
- Prior: On appeal from the Virginia Supreme Court of Appeals

Holding
- Vagueness in relating purpose of legislative inquiry, when such inquiry may cause defendant to infringe on his First Amendment rights in order to avoid committing a crime, violates the 14th Amendment

Court membership
- Chief Justice Earl Warren Associate Justices Hugo Black · Felix Frankfurter; William O. Douglas · Tom C. Clark; John M. Harlan II · William J. Brennan Jr. Charles E. Whittaker · Potter Stewart

Case opinion
- Majority: Black, joined by Warren, Frankfurter, Douglas, Clark, Harlan, Brennan, Whittaker, Stewart

Laws applied
- Fourteenth Amendment to the United States Constitution

Scull v. Virginia ex rel. Committee on Law Reform and Racial Activities, 359 U.S. 344 (1959), is a 9–0 ruling by the Supreme Court of the United States which held that a conviction violates the Due Process Clause of the Fourteenth Amendment to the United States Constitution if the defendant is not given an opportunity "to determine whether he was within his rights in refusing to answer" an inquiry put to him by the legislature of a U.S. state.

== Background ==
The state of Virginia enacted a package of statutes in September 1956 designed to ensure racial segregation in that state's public schools despite the ruling of the Supreme Court of the United States in Brown v. Board of Education of Topeka, Kansas, 347 U.S. 483 (1954). The legislative program ("the Stanley Plan") was named for Governor Thomas B. Stanley, who proposed the program and successfully pushed for its enactment. The Stanley Plan was a critical element in the policy of "massive resistance" to the Brown ruling advocated by U.S. Senator Harry F. Byrd, Sr. The Stanley Plan was introduced and passed during a special session of the Virginia General Assembly. During the special session, Delegate James McIlhany Thomson, an ardent segregationist, introduced a bill (unrelated to the Stanley Plan) to establish a seven-member Assembly committee to investigate any group seeking to influence public opinion in the state, teacher quality, uniformity of courses and curriculum in the public schools, and the effects of integration on public education. The bill passed on the last day of the special session. The legislation established a 10-member Assembly committee composed of six delegates and four senators. The committee was charged with investigating the effect of integration on public schools, racial matters in the state in general, and the effectiveness of racial legislation. The committee was to issue a report and make recommendations (if any) to the Assembly by November 1, 1957.

The legislative investigating committee was officially titled the Virginia Committee on Law Reform and Racial Activities, but was publicly known as the "Thomson Committee" after its chair, Delegate Thomson. In 1954, David Scull (a printer in Annandale, Virginia) began publishing literature in favor of racial integration on behalf of a number of organizations in Virginia. The Fairfax Citizens' Council, a group opposed to racial integration, publicized Scull's role in the printing of the literature in 1957. Scull was subpoenaed to appear before the Thomson Committee, and subjected to an aggressive series of questions (many of which did not pertain to the committee's legal charge). Scull refused to answer some of these questions and asked whether they pertained to the committee's legal charge. The committee went to court to force him to answer. The Circuit Court of Arlington County ordered Scull to answer the questions. He refused, and was convicted of contempt of court.

Scull appealed his conviction to the Virginia Supreme Court of Appeals. Without comment, the state supreme court declined to hear his appeal in 1958.

Scull appealed to the U.S. Supreme Court, which granted certiorari and agreed to hear the case.

== Ruling ==
Associate Justice Hugo Black wrote the decision for the unanimous Court.

Scull made four claims:

1. That the committee was part of a program of state-sponsored harassment of those attempting to win racial integration of Virginia's public schools;
2. That the questions put to him violated his First Amendment rights to freedom of speech, freedom of assembly, and right to petition;
3. That the information sought was not relevant to the legislative function of the Virginia General Assembly; and
4. That despite repeated requests, the committee failed to show that its interrogatories were relevant to its legal charge.

Black declined to address the first three of Scull's claims, deciding instead to rule on the narrow grounds of the fourth claim. The record of the committee's proceedings showed that Scull asked the committee what the purpose of its inquiry was, so that he could determine which questions put to him were pertinent. Chairman Thomson made an ambiguous reply, then told Scull that "several" of the lines of inquiry did not apply to Scull. When Scull claimed that he still did not know what properly constituted the committee's subjects of inquiry, the committee proceeded to ask 31 questions of Scull. Black expressed scepticism regarding the committee's actions: "It is difficult to see how some of these questions have any relationship to the subjects the Committee was authorized to investigate, or how Scull could possibly discover any such relationship from the Chairman's statement."

Thomson's testimony in the contempt proceeding before the Circuit Court further muddied things. During his testimony, Thomson "successively ruled out as inapplicable to Scull each of the subjects which the Legislature had authorized the Committee to investigate." Nor did the state circuit court's instructions to Scull clarify matters. Black noted that the circuit court did not analyze any of the 31 questions put to Scull, did not explain to Scull what the subject of the committee's inquiry was, and did not explain how these questions related to that inquiry.

It was clear, Black held, that the questions put to Scull clearly involved the First Amendment rights of freedom of speech, freedom of the press, and freedom of association. The Court's long-established test in such cases was to determine if there was a compelling governmental interest which could justify infringement on these fundamental rights. But the majority did not need to reach even this constitutional question, Black concluded, because Thomson's, the committee's, and the circuit court's statements about the subject of inquiry were so unclear that Scull was prevented from knowing what he was supposed to answer. "To sustain his conviction for contempt under these circumstances would be to send him to jail for a crime he could not with reasonable certainty know he was committing."

The Supreme Court had repeatedly held (Lanzetta v. New Jersey, 306 U.S. 451 [1939], Jordan v. De George, 341 U.S. 223 [1951], Watkins v. United States, 354 U.S. 178 [1957], Flaxer v. United States, 358 U.S. 147 [1958]) that "fundamental fairness" required that a reasonable certainty exist as to what crime an individual might be committing. Relying on Winters v. New York, 333 U.S. 507 (1948), Black concluded that such certainty is "essential" when individuals are asked to give up their freedom of speech, freedom of the press, and freedom of association out of a fear of violating a vague law. But the "far too wavering, confused and cloudy" responses given to Scull did not meet these standards.

The Court reversed and remanded the case to the Virginia Supreme Court of Appeals.

== Bibliography ==
- Anzalone, Christopher A. Supreme Court Cases on Political Representation, 1787-2001. Armonk, N.Y.: M.E. Sharpe, 2002.
- Duke, Daniel Linden. Education Empire: The Evolution of an Excellent Suburban School System. Albany, N.Y.: State University of New York Press, 2005.
- Virginia Supreme Court of Appeals. Cases Decided in the Supreme Court of Appeals of Virginia. Richmond, Va.: Virginia Dept. of Purchase and Supply, 1959.
