= Glenn A. Burklund =

American politician (1924–1998)

Member of the Virginia House of Delegates from Fairfax
- In office January 10, 1962 – January 7, 1964
- Preceded by: Dorothy S. McDiarmid
- Succeeded by: Dorothy S. McDiarmid

Personal details
- Born: June 27, 1924 Paxton, Illinois, U.S.
- Died: October 5, 1998 (aged 74)
- Party: Republican
- Spouse: Margaret Orosz
- Education: University of Illinois

Military service
- Branch/service: United States Navy
- Years of service: 1943–1946
- Battles/wars: World War II

Glenn Arthur Burklund (June 27, 1924 – October 5, 1998) was an American inventor and Republican politician who served one term in the Virginia General Assembly representing Fairfax County, Virginia, in the 28th House District.

== Early and family life ==
Born in Paxton, Illinois, Burklund attended the University of Illinois and studied engineering but never received a degree. He served in the United States Navy from July 22, 1943, to January 5, 1946. In the Navy, he honed his mechanical abilities, such that after discharge he was able to set up his own research laboratory and sell it. He married Margaret Orosz (1926-)

== Career ==
Burklund received several patents for inventions, five involving textiles. He moved to Northern Virginia and worked for an electronics firm. He also worked as a gunsmith. Burkland was active in the National Rifle Association of America, the Fairfax County Gun Club, and in the local Republican Party. Burklund ran once for elective office, and was elected in 1961 to the part-time position of state Delegate. He became one of several delegates representing Fairfax County, polling fewer votes than Democrats John C. Webb and Hobart K. McDowell Jr. but edging out Democrat Dorothy Shoemaker McDiarmid.

However, Burklund became embroiled in at least two controversies, and the party withdrew its support by the 1963 primary. The first controversy involved his request that the Fairfax library censor three films screened during national library week, particularly one which he thought failed to acknowledge controversy concerning evolution (the local American Legion commander objected to the other two as communistic). Also that July, Burklund led a Fairfax County-based faction opposed to the Arlington County Republican faction of Jack Corbet for chairman of its 10th district committee, which led to a brawl. McDiarmid was thus again elected to represent District 28.

== Death ==
Burklund retired to Axton, Virginia. He died on October 5, 1998.

Virginia House of Delegates
Preceded by Dorothy S. McDiarmid	Virginia Delegate for Fairfax; 1962–1964	Succeeded by Dorothy S. McDiarmid
