= Richard L. Fisher =

American politician (1947–2012)

Member of the Virginia House of Delegates from the 35th district
- In office January 10, 1990 – January 1, 1997
- Preceded by: Dorothy McDiarmid
- Succeeded by: George Lovelace

Personal details
- Born: Olney, Maryland
- Died: August 27, 2012 (aged 64) Culpeper, Virginia
- Party: Republican
- Spouse(s): Beth Fisher (ex-wife), Tina Linden Fisher
- Children: 5
- Education: Virginia Commonwealth University

Richard Leland "Dick" Fisher (September 16, 1947 – August 27, 2012) was an American politician and energy executive from Virginia. He was a member of the Virginia House of Delegates from 1990 to 1997, representing the 35th district in Northern Virginia. He was also a member of the town council of Vienna, Virginia, for 4 years. Outside of politics, Fisher worked for Washington Gas Light Company for about 30 years, and served for several years in the Army Reserve.

== Education and career ==
He earned a bachelor's degree in business management from Virginia Commonwealth University in 1971. He served for several years in the Army Reserve as an LCM-8 operator, departing with the rank of Specialist 7. From 1971 to 2000, Fisher worked for the Washington Gas Light Company, retiring as vice president of operations.

From 2006 to 2008, Fisher worked for the US Department of Education, as Chief of Staff of the Office of Special Education and Rehabilitative Services.

== Electoral politics ==
After serving for many years on various planning and safety commissions, Fisher was elected to the Vienna Town Council in 1985. He served until 1989, supporting sidewalk building initiatives, recycling efforts, and a sales tax on meals and lodging.

In 1989, Fisher ran for the Virginia House of Delegates in the 35th district. The seat was open, as Democrat Dorothy McDiarmid was retiring. Fisher ran as a Republican, facing Democratic nominee David H. Battaglia, a young lawyer. Fisher prevailed in the general election with 51% of the vote. While in office, Fisher was reportedly most proud of his efforts on behalf of special needs children, including a law mandating equitable class sizes for children with mild mental disabilities. Fisher also passed legislation that helped to regulate and legitimize the massage therapy industry, and touted his support to Northern Virginia rail lines and George Mason University.

Fisher announced his intention to resign from the state house in November 1996, citing conflicts between his full time and part time jobs.

== Personal life ==
Fisher was born Sept. 16, 1947, in Olney, Md., to parents Joseph and Elizabeth Fisher. He earned a bachelor’s degree in business management from Virginia Commonwealth University in 1971.

Fisher served for several years in the U.S. Army Reserves. He was stationed in Alexandria for most of his service and served as a landing-craft skipper in the 464th Medium Boat Company, 97th Arcom, First Army.

Fisher died of a heart attack on August 27, 2012. Fisher is survived by his wife, Tina Linden Fisher of Culpeper; a brother, Tom Fisher, and his wife, Julie, of Salisbury, Md.; children Nichole Latiolais, Christina Magee, Dylan Evers, Jake Fisher and Joseph Fisher; four grandchildren; and nephew Matthew Fisher.
