= Robert McIlwaine =

American lawyer and public official (1924–2015)

Robert D. McIlwaine III (September 18, 1924 – February 21, 2015) was an American lawyer and public official. He is known for his defense of Virginia's policies of racial segregation in the civil rights cases in which he represented the state as a lawyer for the attorney general's office, including Loving v. Virginia.

McIlwaine was born in Petersburg, Virginia and obtained a bachelor's degree in biology at the University of Virginia. He then attended law school at Harvard University and the University of Virginia. After serving in the Navy in World War II and the Korean War, he joined the state's attorney general's office in 1954, where he became an influential behind-the-scenes figure in state politics. He served in the attorney general's office for 15 years and rose to chief deputy attorney general, and served as counsel to governors of both parties – Mills E. Godwin Jr., John N. Dalton and Chuck Robb.

In the 1950s and 1960s, McIlwaine represented Virginia in many high-profile civil rights court cases of the Warren Court era, defending the state's racist policies. These cases included disputes about school desegregation, redistricting (including Davis v. Mann), and most notably Loving v. Virginia, in which he unsuccessfully sought to defend before the Supreme Court Virginia's laws prohibiting interracial marriage. McIlwaine often invoked the doctrine of states' rights to defend Virginia's policies.

McIlwaine died of pneumonia at the age of 90. In a 2017 article published on the occasion of the 50th anniversary of Loving, his godson Dave Singleton recalled that McIlwaine's role in civil rights cases was never a topic of discussion in his family.
