= Jeannemarie Devolites Davis =

American politician (born 1956)

Member of the Virginia Senate from the 34th district
- In office January 14, 2004 – January 9, 2008
- Preceded by: Leslie Byrne
- Succeeded by: Chap Petersen

Member of the Virginia House of Delegates from the 35th district
- In office January 14, 1998 – January 3, 2004
- Preceded by: George E. Lovelace
- Succeeded by: Steve Shannon

Personal details
- Born: Jeannemarie Aragona; February 28, 1956 (age 70) Swindon, England
- Party: Republican
- Spouse: Tom Davis
- Children: Nichole, Ashley, Cassandra, Alexandra
- Education: University of Virginia
- Occupation: Consultant

Jeannemarie Aragona Devolites Davis (born February 28, 1956) is an American politician. She served in the Virginia House of Delegates 1998–2004 and the Senate of Virginia 2004–2008. She was a candidate for the 2013 Republican nomination for Lieutenant Governor of Virginia, but was eliminated in the first round of voting at the 2013 Republican convention in Richmond, Virginia. Her husband, Tom Davis, was a member of the United States House of Representatives.

Virginia Governor Bob McDonnell appointed Davis director of the Virginia Liaison Office in Washington, D.C. in January 2010. She resigned in September 2012 to pursue an unsuccessful bid for lieutenant governor.

== Early life and education ==
Davis was born on a United States Air Force base in Swindon, England, where her father was a civilian employee. The family eventually settled in Arlington, Virginia, where she graduated from Yorktown High School in 1974. In 1978, she received a B.A. degree in mathematics from the University of Virginia.

Davis has married twice. She had four children with her first husband, John Devolites. She married Tom Davis in 2004; it was also his second marriage.

== Career ==
=== State House of Delegates ===
After losing two races for the Fairfax County Board of Supervisors to Gerry Connolly, Devolites ran for the Virginia House of Delegates. In 1997, with Tom Davis as her mentor and chief donor she won her race for member of the House of Delegates. She was elected to become the House Majority Whip, the first woman to serve in this position, before being elected to the State Senate.

=== State Senate ===
Davis served one term in the State Senate, losing her run for reelection in 2007. Her district was the most Democratic district held by a Republican in Virginia. Her Democratic successor is Democrat and former Delegate Chap Petersen, whose previous House district is enclaved in the 37th Senatorial District. Her top donor was her husband's Political Action Committee (PAC), the Federal Victory Fund, donating almost $25,000. Tom Davis's other PAC, the Va Victory Fund, had also donated over $92,000 in her House races. Mrs. Davis also received another $55,616 from the National Republican Congressional Committee when her husband was the Committee Chair. This RNCC donation was the most donated to any VA candidate not running statewide.

==== Voting record ====
On evaluations from Project Vote Smart, on a scale of 100 from 2004 to 2006, Davis scored 67-100 percent from the Virginia Education Association, 50-71 percent from the Virginia League of Conservation Voters, and 78-84 percent from the Chamber of Commerce. She scored near zero from the Virginia National Organization for Women and all reporting abortion rights groups, 80% from the Chamber of Commerce, and a 94% from the conservative Family Foundation of Virginia.

==== 2007 endorsements ====
One newspaper and ten unions or business groups endorsed her 2007 election campaign:

- The Washington Post
- Fairfax Education Association
- Virginia Education Association
- Fairfax Local Firefighters
- Virginia Professional Firefighters
- Virginia chapter of the National Active and Retired Federal Employees Association
- Northern Virginia Technology Council
- Fairfax County Chamber of Commerce
- National Federation of Independent Business
- Virginia Association of Realtors
- Virginia Troopers Alliance

== Electoral history ==
Date	Election	Candidate	Party	Votes	%
Virginia House of Delegates, 35th district
November 4, 1997	General	Jeannemarie A. Devolites	Republican	11,233	51.30
November 4, 1997	General	George E. Lovelace	Democratic	10,202	46.59
November 4, 1997	General	Marta S. Howard		457	2.09
November 4, 1997	General	Write Ins		6	0.03
November 4, 1997	General	Incumbent lost; seat switched from Democratic to Republican			
November 2, 1999	General	J A Devolites	Republican	9,928	60.01
November 2, 1999	General	G E Lovelace	Democratic	6,599	39.89
November 2, 1999	General	Write Ins		17	0.10
August 21, 2001	Republican Primary	J A Devolites		2,064	82.83
August 21, 2001	Republican Primary	A G Purves		428	17.17
November 6, 2001	General	J A Devolites	Republican	13,906	59.03
November 6, 2001	General	S A Bleicher	Democratic	9,630	40,88
November 6, 2001	General	Write Ins		20	0.08
Senate of Virginia, 34th district
June 10, 2003	Republican Primary	J A Devolites		5,240	74.89
June 10, 2003	Republican Primary	L J Zone Jr		1,757	25.11
November 4, 2003	General	J A Devolites	Republican	22,690	52.75
November 4, 2003	General	R F Christian	Democratic	20,267	47.12
November 4, 2003	General	Write Ins		58	0.13
November 4, 2003	General	Leslie Byrne was redistricted out; seat switched from Democratic to Republican			
November 6, 2007	General	J. C. "Chap" Petersen	Democratic	25,513	55.33
November 6, 2007	General	Jeannemarie Devolites Davis	Republican	20,490	44.44
November 6, 2007	General	Write Ins		102	0.22

== Campaign finance references ==
- VPAP:donors to Jeanemarie Devolities Davis
- VPAP:VA Donors to Tom Davis Virginia Victory Fund
- VPAP:Tom Davis Leadership Committees

A large percentage of her financial support is contributed from her husband, Tom Davis, and the Republican organizations he directs. Before Virginia's 2007 election cycle, his PACS had donated more than $172,000 to her campaign. In addition, she has received contributions from National Republican organizations directed by Mr. Davis including $300,000 to the Fairfax and Prince William's counties Republican Party committees who in turn donated money and office space to Mrs. Davis; $55,616 from the National Republican Congressional Committee when her husband was Chair, $5,000 from the Republican Main Street Partnership, and $5,000 from Tom DeLay's ARMPAC.

Technology and telecommunications companies have been the largest contributors to Davis's and his wife's separate campaigns and political action committees; they donated more than $1.1 million of the $6.4 million given to the couple's campaigns.

== Affiliations ==
Former Senator Davis worked as a technology consultant for ICG government as of 2007, a position that raised potential conflicts of interest. Previously, she worked as a statistical consultant to the law firm of Akin Gump Strauss Hauer & Feld.

Davis belonged to a number of organizations as of 2007: she was on the Board of Directors of Fairfax Spotlight on the Arts, Homeaid, and Court Appointed Special Advocates (CASA); Chairman of the Board of Trustees for Virginia International University; Member and Past President, Tysons Corner Rotary. She was a member of Tysons Vienna Regional Chamber of Commerce, Central Fairfax Chamber of Commerce, Oakton Women's Club, New Providence Republican Women's Club, American Legislative Exchange Council (ALEC) and National Conference of State Legislatures, Board member of Lattice Incorporated.

== Controversies ==
=== ICG Government ===
She was one of the first hires (as a part-time consultant) for ICG, a firm that assists businesses in obtaining and defending performance under government contracts. At the time of her hire, Congressman Davis was her mentor and campaign manager. ICG Founder and President Don Upson is a longtime friend of Davis. After Devolites was hired by ICG, Davis, then divorced, married Devolites.

The financial benefits between Rep. Davis and his wife, from the ICG job as well as other campaign donations to Mrs. Davis, were highlighted in a June 2007 ethics report "Family Affair" by the Citizens for Responsibility and Ethics in Washington. The report identified ethical questions on financial ties that benefit family members of 64 of the 435 voting members of Congress.

As of December 24, 2008, Davis continues to work for ICG. She reported to The Washington Post that she was paid $78,000 in 2005 for working "10 to 20 hours a week," primarily at home on her cellphone, she said. She made $18,000 a year as a Virginia legislator. Her ICG bio, which continues to describe her as a "Current Virginia State Senator for largest IT district", bio, also is the only one on the ICG website to name a spouse.

=== Disclosures ===
During the week of October 22, 2007, the Davis campaign sent out 60,000 campaign flyers accusing Petersen of not disclosing that his former law firm was working on issues that Petersen voted on while in the House of Delegates. The flyer did not mention that Petersen had not been involved in the legal issues for the client. The flyer included a copy of a section of Petersen's Statement of Economic Interest, which he filed while serving in the House. It includes Petersen's home address, telephone number, and the names of his wife and four children. This information was not redacted by the Davis campaign.

Petersen held a press conference on October 26 in front of Davis' headquarters in Fairfax. He said that "words cannot describe the anger I feel" about the flyer, and called it "shocking" that Davis would use his personal information in such a manner. Petersen said that advertising his personal information was not in and of itself a problem, but using his personal phone number and children's identification was not appropriate or safe in an attack ad. Such tactics, Petersen said, endangered his family. Mrs. Petersen complained of receiving two telephone calls related to the attack ad, and police presence appeared at the home, before the family vacated the house. In response, Davis said in her own press conference that because the information was public and included to supporters, it was appropriate for an attack ad.

Because of the controversy, the Virginia Coalition of Police and Deputy Sheriffs withdrew its initial endorsement of Davis.

Devolites Davis also claimed that Petersen's campaign uploaded a video to YouTube which brought up her daughter's armed robbery conviction of several years ago. However, according to Washington CBS affiliate WUSA, there is no evidence anyone from the Petersen camp uploaded the video.
