= Edmund D. Campbell =

American politician

President, Arlington County Board of Supervisors

Personal details
- Born: March 12, 1899 Lexington, Virginia, US
- Died: December 7, 1995 (aged 96) Arlington, Virginia, US
- Party: Democratic
- Spouses: Estelle Butterworth Campbell; Elizabeth Pfohl Campbell
- Children: 4
- Education: Washington and Lee University; Harvard University; Washington and Lee Law School
- Occupation: Attorney and municipal politician

Edmund Douglas Campbell (March 12, 1899 – December 7, 1995) was a Virginia lawyer and progressive politician in Arlington County, Virginia, who opposed the Byrd Organization, particularly its declared Massive Resistance to the U.S. Supreme Court decisions in Brown v. Board of Education in 1954 and 1955. Campbell and his wife Elizabeth Pfohl Campbell became known for their efforts to improve and desegregate Arlington public schools, and organized a coalition of parents and citizens from across Virginia (the Save Our Schools Committee) to allow schools which desegregated pursuant to court order to remain open, contrary to the announced policies of Senator Harry F. Byrd and his allies.

== Early and family life ==
Campbell was born on March 12, 1899, in Lexington, Virginia, to Henry Donald Campbell and his wife, the former Martha Miller. Both his grandfather and father had taught at Washington and Lee University. His father often told young Edmund of his own childhood living next to Robert E. Lee, who served as the college's president after the American Civil War, and how he rode behind the former General on his horse, Traveller. Family heirlooms included letters from Confederate Generals Lee and Stonewall Jackson.

Edmund Campbell was admitted to Washington and Lee when he was 15 years old and would graduate as valedictorian of his class in 1918. He served six weeks in the U.S. Army, but was discharged when World War I ended. Campbell then attended Harvard University and received a master's degree in economics. He returned to Virginia to study law, and graduated first in his class from Washington and Lee Law School in 1922, then moved to Washington, D.C.

Campbell married Estelle Butterworth in 1926, and moved across the Potomac River to Arlington. Before her death in 1934, they had a son (who became Rev. Edmund D. Campbell Jr.) and a daughter (Virginia Campbell Holt). In June 1936, Campbell married Elizabeth Pfohl, North Carolina-born president of a women's college in Staunton, Virginia. They had twin sons, Donald and Benjamin, in 1941.

The Campbells sent their children to the local public schools. Elizabeth Campbell remained active in education and would later serve on Arlington's school board and help found WETA-TV (Washington Educational Television Association) during their marriage of nearly six decades. Edmund Campbell was also active in the Rotary Club and Masons. He became a vestryman of St. Mary's Episcopal Church in north Arlington, and would later help found St. Peter's Episcopal Church in north Arlington.

== Career ==
After admission to the Virginia bar, Campbell moved to Washington, D.C., and later rented a home in Arlington, Virginia, which was a growing streetcar suburb of the national capital. His legal practice, with Douglas, Obear & Campbell and later Jackson & Campbell, included northern Virginia and Washington, D.C. Campbell was a member of the American Bar Association, the bar of the Supreme Court of the United States, and in 1962 served as President of the District of Columbia Bar. He also lectured in law for National University in Washington.

=== Arlington County ===
In the 1930s, Campbell served on the Arlington County Public Utilities Commission, which succeeded in reducing gas and electric rates.

From 1940 until 1947, Campbell served on the Arlington County Board, including a term as chairman. He helped establish the county's first master zoning plan, and in his last term helped establish Arlington's first elected School Board (on which his wife Elizabeth would serve, including as chairwoman). Campbell then organized Arlingtonians for a Better County, a nonpartisan coalition that became a major force in county politics.

In 1952 Campbell narrowly lost his one run for higher office, in the newly created 10th congressional district. The Byrd organization refused to support him because of his desegregation advocacy; Campbell lost by 332 votes to Republican Joel T. Broyhill, a segregationist and World War II veteran. Broyhill would go on to represent the district for almost a quarter-century.

=== Supreme Court advocate ===
As an attorney, Campbell successfully argued a case which overturned a Virginia law prohibiting racially integrated seating in public places. During Massive Resistance, Campbell represented Norfolk parents and schoolchildren in federal court, which led to the three-judge decision in James v. Almond on January 19, 1959, which with a Virginia Supreme Court decision on the same day (both eventually accepted by Governor J. Lindsay Almond), led Norfolk and Arlington to desegregate their schools (peacefully) in early February, 1959. This led to successful desegregation of local schools across Virginia.

Campbell also represented northern Virginia legislators who complained that reapportionment after the 1960 census continued to under-represent the growing northern Virginia suburbs. The United States Supreme Court in Davis v. Mann agreed, leading to the famous "one man, one vote" rationale.

== Death and legacy ==
Campbell died at home of cardiopulmonary arrest in December, 1995, survived by his wife, three sons (two of whom had become Episcopal priests), daughter and several grandchildren and great grandchildren. After a funeral service at St. Peter's Church in north Arlington, he was interred in the family plot in Stonewall Jackson Memorial Cemetery in Lexington, Virginia.

In 1999, Arlington named a street in the Shirlington commercial area after Campbell and his wife (who one newspaper had called in their lives the "first couple of Arlington"), and erected signs celebrating their lives. In 2017, the Arlington Public School board renamed Glencarlyn Elementary School as "Campbell Elementary School" to honor the contributions of Edmund and Elizabeth Campbell.
