= Elizabeth Campbell (television) =

American television executive (1902–2004)

Elizabeth Pfohl Campbell
- Born: Margaret Elizabeth Pfohl; 4 December 1902; Winston-Salem, North Carolina
- Died: 9 January 2004 (aged 101); Arlington, Virginia
- Education: Salem College; Columbia University Teachers' College(M.A.)
- Known for: Founder of WETA-TV; school board member during Massive Resistance
- Spouse: Edmund D. Campbell
- Children: 3

Margaret Elizabeth Pfohl Campbell (December 4, 1902 – January 9, 2004) was an American public television executive. Trained as a teacher, she also served as a college administrator and led the first elected school board for the Arlington Public Schools as it attempted to navigate Massive Resistance, then helped found WETA-TV, the first public television station in Washington, D.C.

== Early and personal life ==
Elizabeth Pfohl was born in Winston-Salem, North Carolina to a Moravian minister and a music teacher. She had a sister, Ruth, who survived her. Pfohl received her high school education at Salem Academy where she graduated in 1919. She then attended Salem College, a related institution, and received a bachelor's degree in education in 1923. She later received her master's degree in education from the Teachers' College, Columbia University.

Pfohl married widower and trial lawyer Edmund D. Campbell Jr. in 1936, and moved with him to Arlington, Virginia, where she helped to raise his two children. The couple also had three children together. Campbell survived her husband, and the twins H. Donald Campbell and Rev. Benjamin P. Campbell and their sister Virginia Campbell Holt survived her, as did nine grandchildren and five great-grandchildren.

== Educator and school board chair ==
Pfohl returned to her high school to begin her education career, teaching girls at Salem Academy and, after two years, she began teaching college level courses. She then moved into education administration, as dean of Moravian College for Women in Bethlehem, Pennsylvania, for two years (although she was just 25 when appointed). Beginning in 1929, and during the Great Depression until 1936, Pfohl was dean at Mary Baldwin College in Staunton, Virginia.

In Arlington, as she raised her family, Campbell realized that Virginia's public schools had very real problems, in part due to underfunding, as well as policies of racial segregation which had been added to the state constitution early in the century.

In 1947, Campbell was elected to the school board of Arlington County, Virginia, which was the first directly elected school board in Virginia. She was the first woman on a school board in the state of Virginia. While on the board (beginning in 1948, and including after her re-election in 1951), Campbell was instrumental in adding fine arts classes, as well as comparable facilities for African-American and white students. She also led efforts to secure higher teacher salaries and build new schools in the growing city.

Campbell served as the school board's chair from 1950 until 1956, when Arlington's elected school board was replaced by an appointed board during the state's Massive Resistance crisis. Beginning in 1954, Campbell helped pave the way to desegregate Arlington's public schools, despite opposition to the Supreme Court's decisions in Brown vs. Board of Education proclaimed by Virginia's U.S. Senator Harry F. Byrd Sr. and others. Her husband came to represent parents of students in Norfolk, Virginia who had been locked out of schools closed by the Byrd Organization rather than allow then to integrate pursuant to court orders. Both Campbells sought to work with parents across the state to resolve the crisis.

On January 19, 1959, separate decisions of the Virginia Supreme Court affirmed racial segregation as unconstitutional, and parts of segregationists' workaround attempts as unconstitutional. Although the governor (and former attorney general) J. Lindsay Almond had initially supported Massive Resistance, he recognized judicial authority. Both Arlington's and Norfolk's schools peacefully desegregated in February 1959. Campbell was again elected to the school board later that year, and again was its chair from 1960 to 1962.

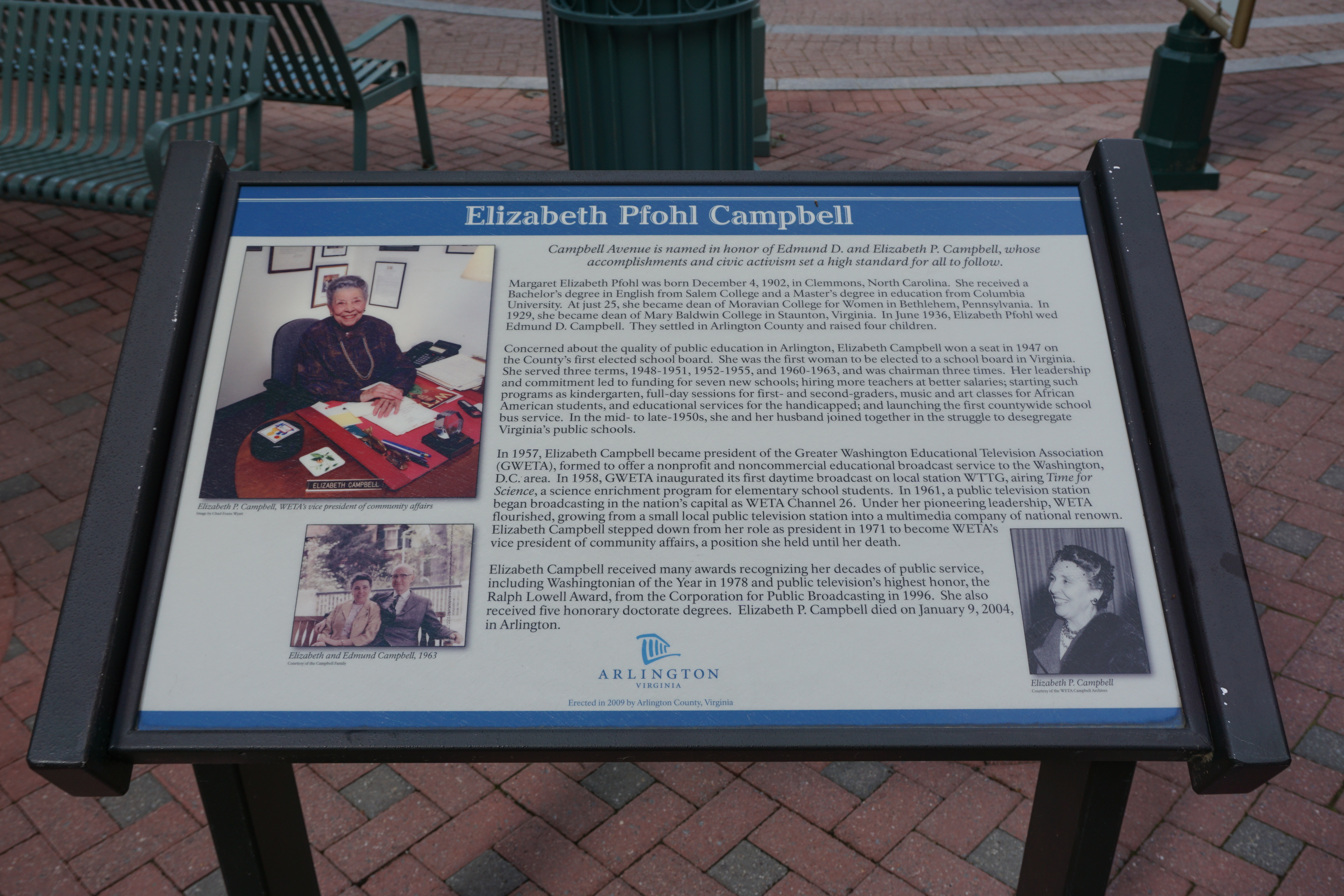
Elizabeth_Pfohl_Campbell_plaque;_Shirlington,_Arlington,_VA

== WETA and Public Broadcasting ==
Campbell had been intrigued by the power of television since the 1940s, believing that it could be used for educational purposes. In 1952, the Federal Communications Commission (FCC) authorized Channel 26 to be designated for educational television and, in 1953, the Greater Washington Educational Television Association (GWETA) was created. Campbell joined the GWETA in 1956, initially as vice chairman, and became president a year later. While she was the GWETA president, Campbell worked hard to raise funds for a local educational TV station in Washington, DC. In 1961, an application was sent to the FCC to open WETA and, on October 2, the station went on the air.

The station initially was on the air only during daytime hours on weekdays but, by 1966, it was on the air 86 hours a week, including weekends. WETA-TV today is on the air 24 hours a day and is the third largest public television station in the United States. In 1966, Campbell helped to expand WETA into the radio market, with a WETA radio station going on the air in 1970 at 90.9 FM, which plays mostly classical music and NPR news programming.

== Post-WETA work ==
In 1971, Campbell retired from the GWETA and WETA-TV as its president, but held the position of vice president of community affairs, which she held until she died. During this time, she helped to launch the Children's Art Festival of the Washington area and the Elizabeth P. Campbell Lecture Series, which presented broadcasting notables. Because of her groundwork for WETA as well as public broadcasting in general, Campbell was given high honors, including an Emmy Award in 1987, honorary doctorates from Washington and Lee University and Salem College. Campbell also won many awards in the Public Broadcasting community for her service, from PBS and the Corporation for Public Broadcasting. Campbell continued to serve on other community boards, including the Northern Virginia Fine Arts Association, the YWCA, and as a board of trustees member for Salem Academy, where she organized a partnership between the school and WETA-TV which included internships for Salem students during their January term.

== Death and legacy ==
On January 9, 2004, Campbell died in Arlington after a brief illness at the age of 101. The Virginia State Senate passed Joint Resolution No. 174 noting "with great sadness the loss of a unique and irreplaceable citizen". In 2017, the Arlington Public Schools in 2017 named a new elementary school to honor her and her late husband. Arlington County had previously erected a historical marker in Shirlington named "Campbell Lane" near WETA headquarters after the couple. In April 2023, the Arlington Public Library's Center for Local History and WETA unveiled a display honoring her in the library's Shirlington Branch, entitled "Elizabeth P. Campbell: Power in the Public".
