= John L. Scott =

US real estate agency

John L. Scott Real Estate
- Company type: Private
- Industry: Real Estate Brokerage
- Founded: Seattle, Washington, United States (1931)
- Founder: John L. Scott
- Headquarters: Bellevue, Washington
- Number of locations: 110 offices (2024)
- Area served: Washington; Oregon; Idaho; Northern California
- Key people: J Lennox Scott (CEO); Monty D. Smith (COO); Erin J. Varriano (General Counsel)
- Website: www.johnlscott.com

John L. Scott Real Estate is headquartered in Bellevue, WA. It currently has over 110 offices with over 3,000 brokers in Washington, Oregon, Idaho and Northern California.

== Current ==
John L. Scott is owned and operated by a third-generation Scott, J. Lennox Scott. In 2016, John L. Scott closed over 36,800 transactions and generated $12 billion in real estate sales.

== History ==
John L. Scott, Inc. was founded by John L. Scott (1898–1986) in 1931 in downtown Seattle.

John L. Scott Real Estate started over seven decades ago when a young Scottish immigrant named John L. Scott set out on a long journey with his bride and infant son in their Ford Model-T—destination San Diego. The two-year trip included a stop in the burgeoning city of Seattle where the young Scott later recalled, "It was like reaching City Beautiful in Pilgrim's Progress." San Diego was quickly forgotten; Seattle would become the Scott family's new home.

John L. Scott began working as a sales associate for a local real estate company, and in 1931, he established his own real estate company. Over the years, the John L. Scott name was largely built on representing exclusive properties. As the founding Scott used to say, "John L. Scott represents quality homes on quality streets."

== Foundation ==
In 1997 the John L. Scott Foundation was formed in honor of company founder John L. Scott. The agents and staff of John L. Scott Real Estate donate both time and money to the foundation. That money is used to raise millions of dollars for children's healthcare throughout Washington, Oregon, and Idaho.
