= Stanley Plan =

1956 statutes supporting racial segregation in Virginia

The Stanley Plan was a package of 13 statutes adopted in September 1956 by the U.S. state of Virginia. The statutes were designed to ensure racial segregation would continue in that state's public schools despite the unanimous ruling of the U.S. Supreme Court in Brown v. Board of Education (1954) that school segregation was unconstitutional. The legislative program was named for Governor Thomas B. Stanley, a Democrat, who proposed the program and successfully pushed for its enactment. The Stanley plan was a critical element in the policy of "massive resistance" to the Brown ruling advocated by U.S. Senator Harry F. Byrd Sr. The plan also included measures designed to curb the Virginia state chapter of the National Association for the Advancement of Colored People (NAACP), which many Virginia segregationists believed was responsible for "stirring up" litigation to integrate the public schools.

The plan was enacted by the Virginia Assembly on September 22, 1956, and signed into law by Governor Stanley on September 29. A federal court struck down a portion of the Stanley plan as unconstitutional in January 1957. By 1960, nearly all of the major elements of the plan (including the litigation curbs aimed at the NAACP) had been struck down by the U.S. Supreme Court and other federal and state courts. The constitutional invalidity of the Stanley plan led new governor of Virginia, J. Lindsay Almond, also a Democrat, to propose "passive resistance" to school integration in 1959. The Supreme Court declared portions of "passive resistance" unconstitutional in 1964 and again in 1968.

== Background ==
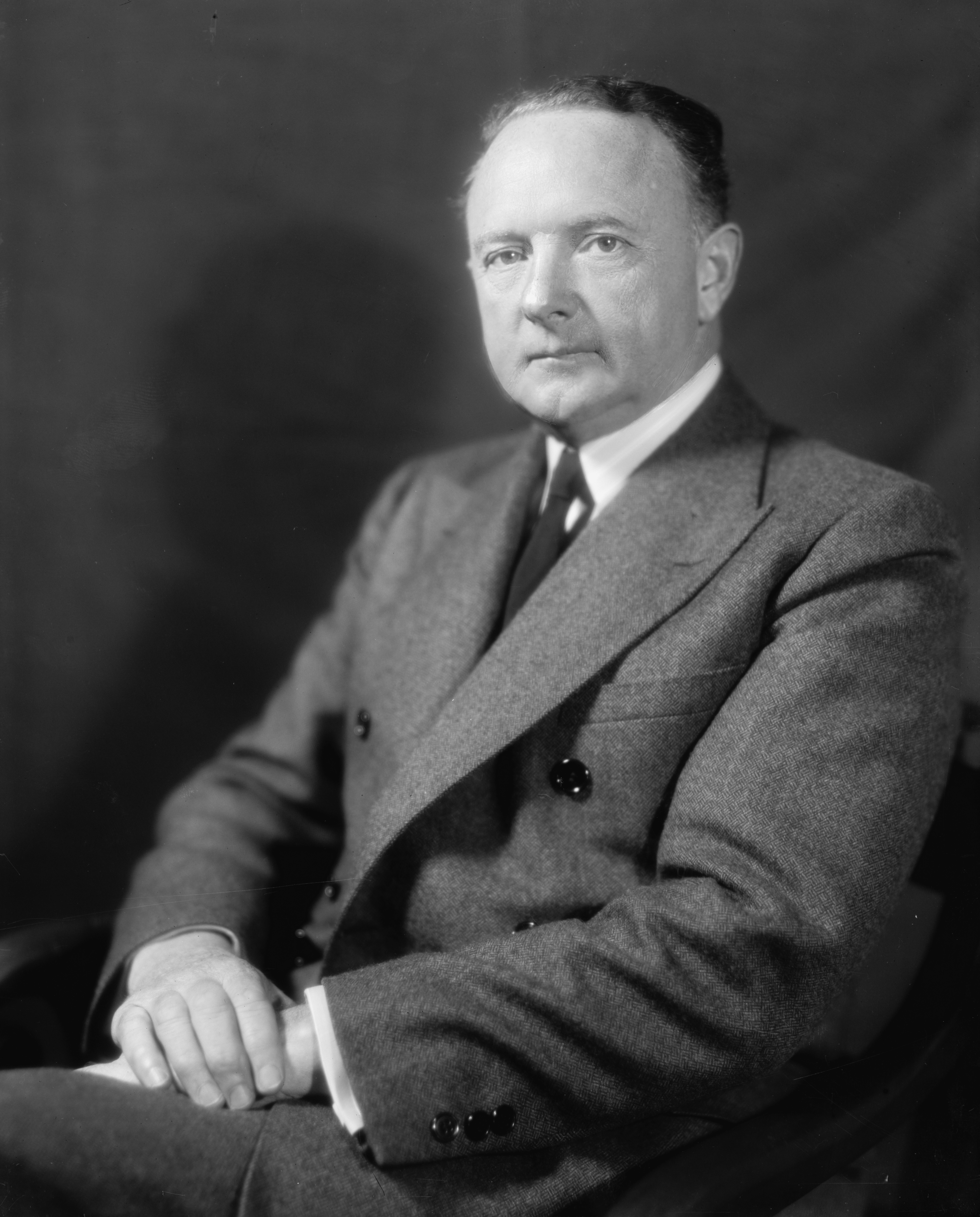
Senator Harry F. Byrd Sr., who advocated "massive resistance" to school integration.

On May 17, 1954, the U.S. Supreme Court handed down its ruling in Brown v. Board of Education, in which the unanimous court held that separate public schools for black and white students were unconstitutional. Although agitation for an end to racial segregation in schools (and society at large) had been building in the United States since the end of World War II, Brown sparked the modern American civil rights movement.

The initial reaction of most Virginia politicians and newspapers to the Brown decision was restrained. From the 1920s to the late 1960s, Virginia politics had been dominated by the Byrd Organization, a political machine led by Senator Harry F. Byrd Sr., another segregationist Democrat (who was also a former governor of Virginia). Top leaders in the Byrd Organization, such as Governor Thomas B. Stanley and then–Attorney General J. Lindsay Almond, were also at first reserved in their reaction to the Brown ruling.

However, this changed when James J. Kilpatrick, editor of The Richmond News Leader in Richmond, Virginia, quickly adopted a defiant and unyielding opposition to racial integration of public schools. Kilpatrick adopted the pre–American Civil War constitutional theory of interposition, and began publicly pushing for the state of Virginia to actively oppose the Supreme Court. Kilpatrick's hardening position, historian Joseph J. Thorndike has written, "likely...helped stiffen the resolve of several key figures, especially Byrd." On June 18, 1954, political leaders in Virginia's Southside (a collection of counties in the south-central region of the state) met and agreed to ask for vigorous state opposition to Brown. They began calling themselves the Defenders of State Sovereignty and Civil Liberties, and members included U.S. Congressmen William Munford Tuck and Watkins Abbitt as well as state senators Charles T. Moses and Garland Gray. They selected Farmville businessman Robert B. Crawford as their president. Stanley, himself from the Southside, was deeply influenced by the strong segregationist sentiments expressed at this meeting. Six days later, Governor Stanley announced he would "use every legal means at my command to continue segregated schools in Virginia."

=== The Gray Commission ===
On August 30, 1954, Governor Stanley announced the appointment of a commission, chaired by State Senator Garland Gray, to recommend a legislative response to Brown. Officially titled the Virginia Public Education Commission, it was more popularly known as the Gray Commission. In October 1954, a pro-segregation group called the Defenders of State Sovereignty and Individual Liberties (widely known as "the Defenders") formed. The Defenders not only demanded that state legislators pledge not to support racial integration, but in June 1955 called for legislation to be enacted which barred state funds from being spent on school desegregation. Although limited primarily to the Southside and numbering no more than 15,000 members, the Defenders proved highly influential in state politics.

The crisis over school desegregation worsened throughout 1955. On May 31, 1955, the Supreme Court in Brown v. Board of Education of Topeka (known as Brown II) ordered that school desegregation occur with "all deliberate speed". Two weeks later, Governor Stanley and the Virginia State Board of Education announced that state policy would be to continue to operate the state's public schools on a segregated basis. Then, in a seemingly unrelated case, the Supreme Court of Virginia ruled on November 7, 1955, in Almond v. Day that providing state funds to private schools violated Article 141 of the state constitution. (In 1954, the Virginia General Assembly had enacted legislation providing educational vouchers to underage dependents of veterans who were wounded or had died in World War II). Kilpatrick and several Virginia political leaders had supported vouchers as a way of circumventing desegregation, and the Almond decision struck directly at this proposal. The Gray Commission issued its report just five days after the Virginia Supreme Court's decision in Almond. The report, which wholeheartedly supported racial segregation in schools and denounced the Supreme Court's 1954 Brown decision, made a number of recommendations. Two stood out. First, the Commission proposed that the state constitution be amended to permit education vouchers to be given to those parents who did not want their children attending integrated schools, or to those children who lived in counties where public schools had been abolished. Second, the Commission advised amending state education law to permit local school boards to assign students to schools on the basis of factors (such as aptitude, availability of facilities, health, and transportation needs) other than race.

Stanley proposed enacting all the proposals recommended by the Gray Commission, with the exception of the pupil assignment provision. The governor also sought an amendment to state law authorizing and directing the governor to withhold state funding from any public school district when the "public interest, or safety, or welfare" required it. The plan would also permit a local school district to close its public schools (in which case every child would get a tuition voucher to attend a private school) or opt to not take state funding.

=== Legislative maneuvering and the rise of "massive resistance" ===
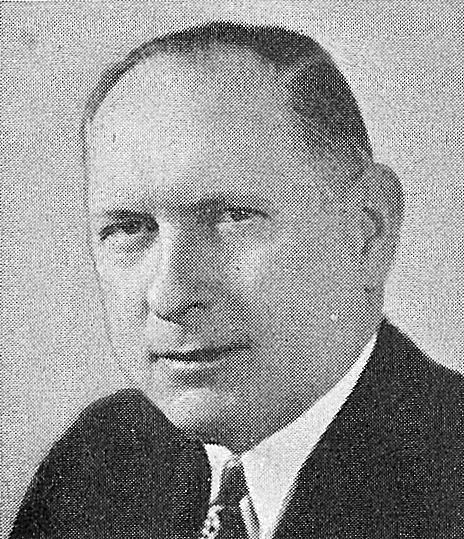
Governor Thomas B. Stanley, after whom the "Stanley plan" is named

Governor Stanley called the General Assembly into special session on November 30, 1955, to consider adopting the Gray Commission's report (although not its actual recommendations). During what one newspaper called a "hasty, almost hysterical four-day session", the General Assembly "adopted" the Gray Commission's recommendations—although it did not enact them into law. The legislature did approve a referendum for January 9, 1956, to call a state constitutional convention. A number of individuals and organizations came out against the Gray Commission's proposals as too moderate, however. Among these were Representative (and former Governor) William M. Tuck, Virginia House Speaker E. Blackburn Moore (a close friend of Byrd's), the Defenders, Kilpatrick, and even Gray himself. For nearly three weeks in late November and early December, Kilpatrick wrote almost daily in the pages of the Richmond News Leader in favor of interposition.

In near-record numbers, Virginia voters turned out on January 9 to approve the call for a constitutional convention by a 2-to-1 margin.

After the referendum, Kilpatrick and now Byrd, too, began pressing for an even stronger legislative response, based on the constitutional justification of interposition. The Virginia General Assembly opened its 60-day legislative session on January 11, 1956. Almost immediately, Byrd's supporters in the legislature demanded that the Assembly support interposition, and a resolution to adopt the legal theory as state policy passed on February 1, 1956. On February 25, Byrd called for "massive resistance" by Southern states against the Brown ruling.

But a fracture in the pro-segregation movement prevented much legislation from moving forward during the remainder of the regular legislative session. Hopes were initially high when, on March 6, 1956, the Virginia constitutional convention voted 39-to-1 to approve the constitutional amendment to permit educational vouchers. Five days later, 96 members of the United States Congress sponsored a resolution (introduced by Senator Byrd) called the "Southern Manifesto", which denounced the Brown decision and encouraged states to "resist forced integration by any means." But moderate segregationist forces (which supported the Gray Commission plan) opposed the more extreme segregationists (who believed that public opinion was becoming more and more inflamed against Brown). Byrd cautioned Virginia state legislators to "go slow" (a now-famous political phrase). Byrd and the other extreme segregationists hoped that public opinion would continue to harden against Brown, allowing political leaders to adopt interposition rather than a more moderate response. But the moderate segregationists, too, had some early successes. A resolution declaring the Brown decision null and void was defeated by the state house on January 18.

As moderates battled extremists in the General Assembly and time wore on, many state legislators began to feel (with school budgets due in just 60 days on May 30) that there was not enough time to pass the Gray Commission plan. The two sides began to fight over whether to delay a year before passing any new school legislation. Moderate segregationists began to worry that public education would be destroyed by tuition vouchers, and were not willing to implement such a plan even if it meant saving segregation. House Speaker Moore introduced a resolution which would require school districts to remain segregated for the coming 1956–1957 school year while the legislature worked on a legislative end-run of Brown. But state Attorney General J. Lindsay Almond argued the bill left the state legally exposed, and advocated instead a special session of the legislature in the summer in order to meet the "good faith" requirement of the Brown II decision. The Moore resolution was defeated, as was the Gray Commission's proposal to allow local school boards to assign students to schools on factors other than race. Three days before the legislature adjourned, Governor Stanley proposed a plan to deny state funds to any school district which integrated. But this plan was also defeated. The legislative session ended on March 12, 1956.

== The Stanley plan ==
Although calls for a special session of the legislature had been made in February and March, Governor Stanley was not initially receptive to the idea at the beginning of April. In mid-April, Virginia Lieutenant Governor Gi Stevens urged Stanley to call a special session of the General Assembly to reconsider the Gray Commission proposals. In May, at least one state delegate urged the General Assembly to call itself into special session.

During the spring and into the summer, Stanley began meeting with Senator Byrd, State Senator Gray, and others to strategize about a course of action. Byrd was concerned that one or more local school districts might integrate, creating a domino effect that would lead to integration across the entire South. Preventing this from happening became the preeminent concern of Stanley, Byrd, and the others. Stanley called the Gray Commission back into session in late May 1956, but the group was unable to immediately come up with any new recommendations. Attorney General Almond publicly urged Stanley to call a special session of the legislature on May 31, but House Speaker Moore demanded to know what proposals Almond felt the legislature should pass before any special session was called. On June 4, the Gray Commission again reported to the governor that it had not been able to improve on its November proposals, but it, too, advised the governor to call a special session of the legislature. The following day, Governor Stanley announced he would call the legislature into special session in late August.

Governor Stanley's reversal of position regarding the special session seemed inexplicable, especially in light of the lack of new legislative proposals, but events had transpired which had changed his mind. In part, Stanley himself had come around to the "massive resistance" viewpoint. Various court decisions of the previous spring had convinced him that the federal courts (and the federal government) would not compromise on the issue of segregation. Additionally, Stanley felt emboldened by a change in his status within the Byrd Organization. Initially, Senator Byrd had kept Stanley out of his inner circle's legislative discussions. But by late spring Byrd began including Stanley in these talks. Byrd and his close political allies were pressing for extreme measures (such as closing schools) in response to integration, and Stanley realized that action had to be taken soon or integration would occur before these measures could be enacted. In this regard, Stanley was going against the Byrd Organization, which believed that public opinion would become even more extreme during the summer and give the organization greater political capital and freedom of movement.

=== Crafting the Stanley plan ===
There had also been changes agreed in the legislative approach which had occurred behind closed doors. The Gray Commission's public claim on May 28 that it had nothing new to report was not truthful. In fact, a secret meeting of the Gray Commission's executive committee had taken place on May 27 which Representative Howard W. Smith, Representative Watkins Moorman Abbitt, Representative Burr Harrison, Tuck, and other outsiders had attended. The group approved of Stanley's March 9 proposal to cut off all state funds for any school district which integrated, and discussed a number of other proposals (including a pupil assignment plan, whether to require local approval of integration or local approval of taxes to support integration, and repeal of state laws permitting school districts to be sued). Although the full Gray Commission met publicly the following day, they were secretly joined in executive session by Governor Stanley. Stanley announced that he was going to support a special session of the legislature, and that if the Gray Commission could not come up with any new proposals then he himself would craft bills for the General Assembly to consider. Although no plan was formally agreed upon, the Gray Commission asked its counsel David J. Mays to craft proposals along six lines: 1) Cutting off state funds to any school district which integrated; 2) Allowing local referendums to veto the appropriation of local funds for integration; 3) Repeal of state laws allowing school districts to be sued; 4) Allowing the state to invoke its police power to prevent integration (under the assumption that integration would lead to public unrest and disorder); 5) Enacting a pupil assignment plan to be implemented solely by the governor (under the assumption that no court would jail the governor); and 6) Enacting a pupil assignment plan to be implemented solely by the General Assembly (under the assumption that no court would jail the entire legislature). No action was taken on these proposals at the Gray Commission's meeting on June 4.

With discussions on a legislative program at a standstill, on June 11 Gray called together the seven members of the Gray Commission most in favor of "massive resistance." They agreed to support a legislative program in favor of "massive resistance" and met with Governor Stanley that night. Stanley said he was willing "to go to any extreme that may be necessary to prevent integration anywhere in Virginia."

The basic legislative proposals of the "Stanley plan," The Washington Post reported, were worked out at a secret meeting on July 2 in the United States House Committee on Rules hearing room in the United States Capitol. At the meeting were Abbitt, Byrd, Gray, Smith, Tuck, Stanley, and seven Southside state legislators. The group agreed to a five-point legislative program: 1) No public school integration would be tolerated in Virginia; 2) School districts which integrated would lose state funding; 3) The state law permitting school districts to be sued would be repealed; 4) The power to assign students to schools would be taken away from local school boards and transferred to the governor; and 5) The governor would have the power to close any school district which integrated. Despite the group's many public statements supporting local control of schools, Tuck later remarked that the purpose of the plan was to prevent integration anywhere in Virginia: "If they [other Virginia areas] won't stand with us then I say make 'em. We cannot compromise. ... If you ever let them integrate anywhere the whole state will be integrated in a short time." Byrd in particular was a vocal supporter of the school closing proposal, and helped draft the other proposals in the plan.

The Stanley plan had the support of the more extreme segregationists in Virginia as well. The first week of July, the Defenders promoted a plan that would withdraw the legal basis for lawsuits against school districts, permit state takeovers of school districts which integrated, and deny state funds to school districts which integrated. The Defenders opposed any pupil assignment plan as too moderate a response. Accommodating this extremist sentiment, the pupil assignment plan approved at the July 2 meeting was fairly weak. After the meeting, Gray independently asked Mays to draft a stronger pupil assignment proposal.

Events soon polarized the state of Virginia on the school segregation issue. On July 12, Judge John Paul Jr., of the Western District Court of Virginia ordered the racial integration of public schools in Charlottesville, Virginia. On July 31, Eastern District Court of Virginia Judge Albert V. Bryan Sr., ordered the racial integration of public schools in Arlington County, Virginia. The rulings sparked additional lawsuits against segregated school districts across Virginia. The rulings also widened the split in the pro-segregation forces, with the more extremist supporters now arguing that the Gray Commission proposals were no longer an option and that only "massive resistance" and a plan implementing interposition were supportable.

Governor Stanley released his legislative proposal to implement "massive resistance" on July 23, 1956, and set August 27, 1956, as the start of the General Assembly's special session. He made it clear that he would not permit desegregation. "There shall be no mixing of the races in the public schools, anywhere in Virginia," he said on July 23.

=== Drafting the legislation ===
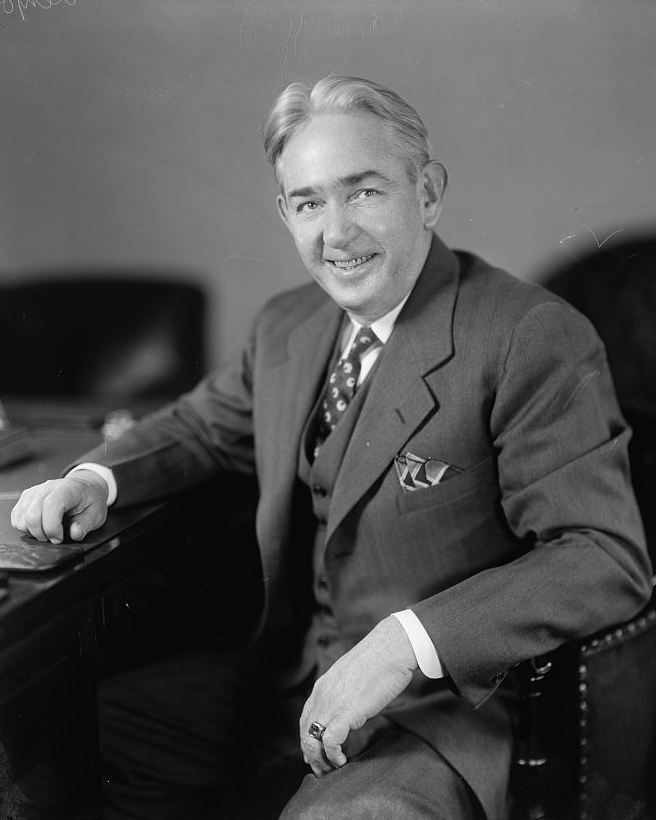
J. Lindsay Almond, whose opinions as Virginia's Attorney General helped shape the Stanley plan.

The Stanley plan split the Executive Committee of the Gray Commission. Attorney General Almond (not a Byrd Organization insider and privately already seeking the governorship) drafted a substitute school closing bill on July 25 that limited the conditions under which the governor could close schools but which Almond thought was more likely to pass constitutional muster. On July 26, Southside politicians attempted to force a vote through the Gray Commission which endorsed the Stanley plan (as redrafted by Almond), but the vote failed. The commission did vote, however, to have Mays draft legislation to implement the proposals contained in the Gray Commission report as well as the governor's recommendations.

Mays spent most of July 31 drafting this legislation with four others: Almond; Mays' associate Henry T. Wickham; Commission staffer John B. Boatwright Jr.; and George McIver "Mack" Lapsley (Director of the Division of Statutory Research and Drafting for the General Assembly). They considered a number of different ways to implement the pupil assignment plan, and decided to bring the various alternatives before the Gray Commission. Wickham was given the task of putting into legislative language the decisions the group made. That same day, Judge Bryan ordered Arlington County public schools desegregated. Mays told the drafting group that Bryan's decision invited a pupil assignment program and suggested it might pass constitutional muster. Almond agreed, and on August 1 told the press that Judge Bryan's decision left open the possibility of implementing a pupil assignment plan that would be neutral on its face but which could keep schools segregated.

Mays, Lapsley, Almond, Wickham, and Boatwright spent August 6 engaged in additional legislative drafting. That same day, Governor Stanley withdrew his school funding bill from consideration by the drafting committee and asked that Almond draft a stronger version which permitted a funding cut-off whether a district integrated voluntarily or not. Kenneth Patty, Assistant Attorney General, ended up drafting the revised bill for the governor. After four days of work, Patty finished his draft of the funding cut-off legislation on August 13.

On August 14, Governor Stanley announced publicly that the main thrust of his legislative proposal would be to withhold funds from any local school district which integrated. In response, Gray called a meeting of the Gray Commission to consider the governor's proposal. Stanley said he would not oppose the Gray Commission's proposal to assign students on the basis of factors other than race (which might lead to some integration). Stanley's concession, The Washington Post reported, was made because it was widely assumed that the Gray Commission was assumed to be strongly in favor of the pupil assignment plan and the tuition grant proposal.

There was intense pressure on Stanley to make good on his concession of August 14. In a closed-door meeting with Assembly delegates attending the 1956 Democratic National Convention, Stanley again insisted on the authority to withhold state funds from any school district which integrated. But Delegate Delamater Davis of Norfolk (the state's largest city) said his city would likely operate its schools without state funds if ordered to integrate. By mid-August, 18 local school districts had placed their budgets on a month-to-month basis so they could close schools on short notice if ordered to desegregate. But wealthy districts such as Arlington and Norfolk let it be known that they would defy state control and integrate. Outside of the Southside, there seemed little support for Stanley's plan. This lack of support led to a shift in Stanley's legislative proposals. Originally, the governor had sought discretionary authority to withhold funds from integrated school districts; now the goal became automatic cut-off.

The revised Stanley plan was presented to the Gray Commission on August 22. The Commission reconsidered its own proposals as well as the Stanley plan and those of other legislators (such as the Boothe-Dalton and McCue plans; see below for descriptions). Before the vote, Governor Stanley said he would not insist on the provision in the funding cut-off bill which would deny funds to all public schools statewide if a single local jurisdiction integrated. Also speaking before the group, Attorney General Almond said the McCue plan would not stop integration lawsuits and probably would violate the state constitution. At the end of its meeting, the Gray Commission voted 19-to-12 to abandon its original proposals and support the Stanley plan. The meeting and vote were contentious. According to local news media, "the Commission capitulated to tremendous pressure from state leaders to junk its own pupil assignment plan". The Commission also approved a program to provide tuition grants to students in shuttered school districts so they could attend a nonsectarian school of their choice. (The original Gray Commission plan awarded tuition grants only to parents in an integrated school system who did not want their child attending an integrated school, or to parents in localities which voluntarily closed their school system to avoid integration.) Thirteen of the 15 Southside legislators on the Gray Commission voted for the Stanley plan. Of the 12 commissioners who voted against the Stanley plan, two were from Arlington County, two were from Richmond, and one was from Norfolk. At the end of the session, Arlington's State Senator Charles R. Fenwick and delegate C. Harrison Mann proposed a series of bills designed to harass the Virginia NAACP, which Fenwick and others believed had instigated the desegregation lawsuits.

After the meeting, Governor Stanley told the press that his plan would make Virginia school systems immune to any integrationist litigation. The onus of school closures, he said, would be on African Americans who "force themselves into a school of another race".

In the days before the start of the special session, it became clear that a major battle was brewing between the moderate segregationists and the extreme segregationists. Delegates from Northern Virginia openly opposed the Stanley plan as well as calls for even more radical legislation. Although most moderate segregationists had joined with the extremists in initially supporting the Gray Commission plan and the call for a constitutional convention, the moderates largely did not support interposition. The moderate segregationists also joined with many (such as leading educators, urban leaders from Northern Virginia, former state superintendent of public schools Dabney Lancaster, several General Assembly delegates, and Gray Commission vice chairman Harry B. Davis) who felt that the tuition voucher proposal would undermine public education.

Many state legislators also seemed unsure about whether to support the Stanley plan. A press poll of the state House Appropriations Committee showed an 8-to-7 split against the plan, with two members undecided. Support for Stanley's plan came almost exclusively from the Southside and counties around it, the Tidewater counties, and portions of Southwest Virginia. Much of the lack of support focused on whether the plan would actually pass court muster as well as halt desegregation. Delegate James McIlhany Thomson, an ardent segregationist, said he believed the Stanley plan would not pass without a pupil assignment program. But on August 24, Garland Gray (whose own position had moved rightward) abandoned support for the pupil assignment plan because it permitted limited integration. Governor Stanley, however, was adamant that the Assembly enact his legislative program implementing "massive resistance." "If we accept admission of one Negro child into a white school, it's all over," he said on August 24.

== Enacting the Stanley plan ==
=== Other plans ===
The Stanley plan was not the only segregationist legislative package introduced at the special session of the Assembly. On July 31, Charlottesville State Senator E.O. McCue offered his own proposal. The McCue plan would: 1) Place all public schools under the control of the Virginia Assembly; 2) Authorize the Virginia State Board of Education to operate the schools in the name of the Assembly; 3) Make all local and county school personnel employees of the Assembly; 4) Bar lawsuits against local school districts unless initiated by the state Attorney General; 5) Require that a school district be immediately taken over by the Assembly if any current school district or school board member is the subject of an integrationist lawsuit, until such time as the Assembly desires to reestablish the local school system; 6) Vest all power to admit and/or assign students to schools in the hands of the Assembly; and 7) Require the Assembly to assign pupils to the schools they currently attend, and require that the assignment of any new pupils or changes to assignments be approved by the Assembly. (At the time, it was estimated that 125,000 pupil assignments were made each year in the state.)

Another legislative package was introduced by State Senators Armistead Boothe and Ted Dalton. The Boothe-Dalton plan was less ambitious in scope. It proposed a plan in which: 1) Student school assignments would be made on factors other than race; 2) Parents unhappy with their child's school assignment would have access to an administrative appeals system; and 3) Teachers could transfer schools only as conditions warranted. The key element of the Boothe-Dalton plan was in how it differed from the Gray Commission student assignment plan. The Gray Commission plan assigned students on the basis of student welfare, availability of facilities and transportation, health, and aptitude, whereas the Boothe-Dalton plan expanded the list of factors to include school attendance areas, academic background, student personality, and student needs. Additionally, the Boothe-Dalton plan provided for an administrative appeal process, which the Gray Commission plan did not. It also identified a very specific, time-consuming process for assignment appeals (to the local school board, the state board of education, state circuit courts, state supreme court, and eventually the U.S. Supreme Court). Finally, it contained a "local option" that would allow racial integration in public schools "where localities are ready" (according to Boothe).

The Mann-Fenwick plan, sponsored by Arlington Delegate C. Harrison Mann and Senator Charles R. Fenwick, was a third major proposal. Their plan established a three-member "School Assignment Board" in each school district whose members would be appointed by the governor. The plan adopted the assignment factors listed by the Gray Commission, but also borrowed language from Supreme Court ruling in Brown v. Board of Education (which some legislators felt would help the statute pass court scrutiny). The Mann-Fenwick plan also permitted any parent to protest the assignment of a new pupil to their school (a process designed to give white parents the legal right to protest the assignment of a black student to an all-white school).

=== Opening of the special session ===
Governor Stanley opened the Assembly's special session on August 27 by declaring that Virginia faced "the gravest problem since 1865". Stanley said his goal was to have the legislature declare that mixing of races in public schools posed a clear and present danger to the operation of an "efficient" public school system (as required by the Virginia constitution). He also asserted that in order to protect the health and welfare of the people, integration must be opposed. He made it clear that he intended to stop all integration. He said he believed that if even one school integrated, integration would sweep over all of Virginia.

The Stanley plan had two main aspects, the governor stated. The first was the funds withholding provision. But he pointed out that his plan (which had now been modified even further since late August) would cut off funds only to portions of school districts. (For example, if an elementary school in a district integrated, the legislation would require funds to be cut off to all elementary schools in that district—but not to secondary schools.) He also noted that this portion of his legislative program would expire on June 30, 1958. Stanley said the second major provision of his program was the tuition grant plan, offered to parents in districts where schools closed. (Unpublicized by the governor was a provision in his tuition grant plan that would require school districts which lost state funds to provide tuition grants.) All legislators should get behind this legislative program for massive resistance, Stanley concluded, because all Virginians of all races had concluded over the past eight months that there should be no mixing of the races anywhere in the state.

Fifty-eight bills about school desegregation were filed for consideration by the Virginia Assembly. The administration immediately entered into negotiations to amend the Stanley plan to allow parents to sue a school district to force it to accept state funds (and resegregate). The Boothe-Dalton and McCue plans were also filed. Backers of the Gray Commission plan filed 14 bills to implement the Commission's proposals, but the Gray plan's supporters said they would abandon their pupil assignment plan in favor of the Mann-Fenwick pupil assignment plan. Delegate C.W. Cleaton introduced a bill to prohibit school districts from raising private money to operate integrated schools, Senator Eugene Snydor introduced a bill to allow residents to vote on whether integrated schools should be closed and whether closed schools should be reopened as segregated, and Delegate Griffith Purcell introduced a bill to require a statewide referendum in November 1956 on whether school segregation should be state policy.

The Assembly recessed on August 28 for the Labor Day holiday, and did not come back into session until September 4. The same day, Governor Stanley conferred with Rep. Smith, Delegate Gray, and House Speaker Moore. Their discussion focused on the Stanley plan's lack of an appeals process for pupil assignments. Stanley agreed to a compromise that would allow an administrative appeal (through an as-yet-to-be-worked-out process), followed by a required appeal to state courts and lower federal courts before any appeal could be taken to the U.S. Supreme Court. The Stanley plan seemed to suffer a serious blow the following day, however, when the Virginia State Board of Education voted not to endorse the plan. Four members strongly opposed withholding state funds from integrated schools, which led to the negative vote. The board also voted to publicly support the original Gray Commission plan. Meeting with the board after the vote, Governor Stanley discussed the possibility of merging his plan with some sort of pupil assignment plan, so that pupil assignment would be permitted but funds would still be withheld if assignment failed to segregate the schools. Another blow to the Stanley plan came when Colgate W. Darden Jr., the former governor of Virginia who was now president of the University of Virginia, announced he opposed the Stanley plan and supported the Gray Commission's original proposals.

=== Post-recess maneuvering ===
By the time the special session resumed on September 4, the number of bills filed for consideration by the Assembly had risen to more than 70. Stanley's supporters led off the debate in both chambers of the Assembly, but Stanley's political position had weakened and media observers felt that he was close to compromising even further on his program. On September 6, Stanley's backers introduced a new bill in the Assembly which would give the governor the power to make pupil assignments. The new bill expanded on the limited criteria previously proposed by the governor by declaring that pupil assignment would be made in order to ensure "efficient" (e.g., segegrated) operation of the schools and to reduce a clear and present danger to the public safety of citizens in those districts which integrated. In an effort to strengthen the Stanley plan's interposition elements, the bill also authorized circuit courts to file injunctions against any school district which violated the assignment decrees—which invited the prospect of pitting state courts against federal ones. Delegate Thomson introduced a bill to establish a seven-member Assembly committee to investigate any group seeking to influence public opinion in the state, teacher quality, uniformity of courses and curriculum in the public schools, and the effects of integration on public education.

From September 4 to 7, the Assembly heard numerous witnesses testify for and against the various plans. State Senator Harry F. Byrd Jr. (son of U.S. Senator Harry F. Byrd Sr.) endorsed the Stanley plan. He also said that if it were struck down, the Byrd Organization intended to keep enacting plans to thwart desegregation forever. Testifying against the various segregationist plans were members of the NAACP and several Northern Virginia legislators. As the hearings ended, Delegates Lucas Phillipps and Frank Moncure introduced a bill to bar the Virginia State Board of Education from denying accreditation to any private school because its building did not meet state standards. (Many legislators believed that if the public schools closed, "white academies" would spring up to offer segregated private education. These schools, however, would be forced to occupy buildings which did not meet state educational codes, and the Phillipps-Moncure bill was intended to solve this problem.)

By September 9, however, it was clear that the Stanley plan was only holding onto a minority of legislative voters.

=== The anti-NAACP bills ===
On September 10, Delegate C. Harrison Mann introduced 16 bills aimed at curbing the National Association for the Advancement of Colored People (NAACP) in Virginia. Five of the bills expanded the state's definitions of barratry, champerty, and maintenance. The eleven other bills collectively required the following groups to file a financial report and membership list annually with state: any group which promotes or opposes state legislation aimed at any race; any organization attempting to influence public opinion on behalf of any race; or any group raising funds to employ legal counsel in connection with racial litigation.

=== Compromise and passage ===
By September 13, a bloc of 17 state senators had formed to oppose any segregationist plan which did not contain an option for local school districts to integrate. Faced with defeat in the Senate, Governor Stanley introduced a new version of his plan on September 12 that would:

1. Make all local school district employees agents of the Assembly.
2. Require that if a school official assigned a black pupil to a white school, that official would be suspended and the governor would become the agent of the Assembly.
3. Give the governor the authority to investigate assignment of black pupils to white schools, and ask black students to return to their original all-black school.
4. Allow the closure of either a single classroom in a white school or the entire school itself, if integration occurred.
5. Give the governor the authority to reassign students to new schools if a school was ordered to integrate or voluntarily integrated.
6. Create tuition grants to encourage black students to leave white schools.
7. Permit the governor to withhold state funds from any school district where segregation had failed.

The new plan drew extensive criticism. Southside legislators feared that only all-white schools would close. Stanley asserted that his plan would permit him to close black schools as well as white ones if an all-white school was forced to integrate (although no one seemed able to find this provision in his newly introduced bills). Attorney General Almond voiced his opinion that the new plan would not stop integrationist lawsuits, and that making the governor an agent of the legislature was clearly unconstitutional. When Speaker Moore later in the day proposed a pupil assignment plan that did not permit local integration, Stanley abandoned his new plan and supported Moore's proposal.

Stanley suffered a significant setback in the House Appropriations Committee on September 14, when supporters of a local option won a narrow vote to amend the Stanley plan to permit local districts to integrate. The amended plan was reported to the House floor. Stanley immediately proposed yet another new plan which automatically cut off funds to any or all portions of a school district which integrated. Under the new Stanley plan, however, a school board could petition to have the schools reopened, although this would require that the Assembly take over the district, the governor to act as the Assembly's agent, and the governor to implement a segregationist pupil assignment plan. The governor's opponents, however, countered with their own plan in which each school board would retain the right to make pupil assignments (although pupil assignments could now be appealed a three-member "pupil assignment board"). Any parents with children in a school could challenge the assignment of a child to that school. Appeals would be required to go through the state court system after leaving the pupil assignment board; in the meantime, the child would remain at their original school (a process intended to delay the assignment of a black student to an all-white school). To ensure that the plan was a "local option," both the school board and the local pupil assignment board would need to adopt a pupil assignment plan, or state funds would be cut off. A cut-off could be avoided if 10% of the school district's voters signed a petition calling for a referendum, and voters approved implementation of a pupil assignment plan (a process intended to allow voters to bypass an integrationist school board). Local communities were also permitted to drop the pupil assignment plan if 25% of school district voters signed a petition calling for a referendum on the issue and voters approved the referendum.

Debate over the competing proposals in the House began on September 17, and was highly contentious. The House subsequently passed the governor's latest proposal. In the Senate, however, the governor's proposal was amended to establish a statewide pupil assignment board appointed by the governor. A conference committee to reconcile the two different bills collapsed. A second conference committee won House members' approval of the three-member statewide pupil assignment committee, while Senate members agreed to allow appeals to go directly to the governor before heading to state courts. When the conference bill came onto the House and Senate floors, legislators from districts under court order to integrate and legislators from districts with small African American populations tried to amend the bill to include a local pupil assignment option but failed. The conference bill passed the Virginia House 62-to-37. After three hours of debate late in the evening of September 21, the Virginia Senate defeated the local option amendment 21-to-17. The conference bill passed the Senate by a vote of 22-to-16. (Although the Virginia Senate has 40 seats, there were only 38 senators present at the time. One senator had recently died. One senator was ill but ready to leave the hospital and cast a deciding vote against the Stanley plan if needed.) The final vote was not taken until 2:00 AM on September 22, and the Virginia Assembly adjourned at 2:30 AM.

Among the bills passed in the final hours of the session were six "legal business" bills designed to curb the NAACP. They were significantly amended in committee to meet the constitutional concerns of a number of legislators. The bills were merged so that only five were reported from the committee and passed by the Assembly. A final bill passed on the last day of the special session created a racial issues investigative committee. This legislation established a 10-member Assembly committee composed of six delegates and four senators. The committee was charged with investigating the effect of integration on public schools, racial matters in the state in general, and the effectiveness of racial legislation. The committee was to issue a report and make recommendations (if any) to the Assembly by November 1, 1957.

Due to the number of last-minute changes and the lateness of the hour during the final votes, the Assembly held a "cleaning up" day on Saturday, September 22, to make technical clarifications to the final bills. After this session, the Assembly adjourned sine die.

Governor Stanley signed the school segregation and legal business bills into law on September 29, 1956. The funding cut-off bill and legal business bills went into effect immediately, while the remaining school segregation bills took effect 90 days later.

== Stanley Plan as enacted ==
Much of the Stanley plan was designed so that the governor or the Assembly would be the focus of the courts, and not local school districts or school district officials and employees. The concept was that local officials felt powerless in the face of the federal courts and could not risk fines or jail. It was believed that federal courts would be reluctant to fine or jail the governor or Assembly, allowing the state to effectively "interpose" itself between the citizenry and federal government.

The elements of the Stanley plan, as enacted, were:

- Pupil assignment to maintain racially segregated schools — Pupil assignment was no longer a local matter under the new legislation. Pupil assignment was now under the authority of a state-level three-member pupil assignment board, whose members were appointed by the governor. The state board made assignments on the basis of race as well as a wide range of other factors, including "sociological, psychological, and like intangible social scientific factors as will prevent, as nearly as possible, a condition of socio-economic class consciousness among pupils." Appeals of pupil assignment were made directly to the governor. Students and their parents were required to appeal the governor's decision through the state courts before seeking to move the appeal to the federal courts.
- Automatic closure of public schools which racially integrate — The legislation required that any school which integrated (voluntarily or not) must be immediately and automatically closed. However, the governor was given the discretion to take over integrated school(s) and reopen the school(s) on a segregated basis rather than close the entire district. Integrated schools did not have to stay closed, however. A school district could petition the governor to take over one or more schools (or the entire district) that had closed and reopen them as segregated schools. Whether exercising his discretion or acting on a petition from the school district, the governor was authorized to act only as an agent of the Assembly. The governor was also required to try to persuade the African American child to return to his or her racially segregated school, so that the schools could reopen on a segregated basis.
- State reassignment and reopening of public schools — If the governor was unsuccessful in persuading African American children to return to their racially segregated school(s), the governor was authorized to reassign the student to a racially segregated all-black school. At any time, however, a school district could request that the governor stop administering the local public schools. However, if the schools reopened on an integrated basis, all state funding would be cut off. (This constituted the local option.)
- Funding cut-off — The cut-off of state funding occurred if a school district exercised the local option. The governor had no discretion in this area; the Virginia constitution required that the state operate "efficient" public schools, and the legislature had defined "efficient" to mean segregated schools. The funds cut-off was automatic, not discretionary. However, funds could be cut off only to integrated elementary or secondary schools or the entire school district (as warranted).
- Tuition grants — School districts were required to offer tuition grants to all students in closed schools. Where schools were integrated, the school district was also required to offer a tuition grant to any pupil who objected to being educated in an integrated school. (The amount of the grant was unclear. One bill passed in the final hours of the special session limited the grant to $350 a semester, while another required the grant to be the average amount each school district spent per pupil.) Funds for the tuition grants were to come from any withheld state school funds, as well local funds. (Oddly, there was no restriction on the use of the grants, other than that they be used for nonsectarian education. This meant a tuition grant could be used to attend an integrated school.)

== Aftermath of the Stanley plan ==
On December 25, 1956, Governor Stanley made his appointments to the state Pupil Assignment Board. The members were: Hugh White, superintendent of the Nansemond County public school system; Beverly H. Randolph Jr., a Charles City County lawyer who later became a Richmond delegate; and Andrew Farley, owner of the Danville Register & Bee in Danville, Virginia, and a local Democratic Party leader. All three men resided in the Southside. Just three days later, the Pupil Assignment Board delegated its powers to local school superintendents and local school boards, reserving the right to approve assignments and deal with special cases or appeals.

The first legal blow to the Stanley plan came on January 11, 1957, when the U.S. District Court for the Eastern District of Virginia held in Adkins et al. v. School Board of the City of Newport News, that the pupil assignment plan was unconstitutional. Over the next two years, multiple federal courts also struck down the pupil assignment law. The Pupil Assignment Board, however, continued to claim jurisdiction and legal authority over pupil assignments, leading to widespread confusion among Virginia's school boards. In November 1957, Almond was elected Governor of Virginia. Convinced that "massive resistance" was doomed to failure, Almond pushed to abolish the statewide pupil assignment board, and in April 1959 won passage of a new law which returned control over pupil assignment to local school districts. Angry about the new law, the three members of the assignment board quit on February 24, 1960. On June 28, 1960, the Fourth Circuit Court of Appeals affirmed Adkins and ruled the state pupil assignment board was unconstitutional. During its three-year existence, the state board made 450,000 pupil assignments but had never permitted an African American child to attend school with whites.

The school closure portion of the Stanley plan was not challenged until after it was invoked, and no school closures occurred until September 1958. In August 1958, federal courts were nearing decisions on the integration of school systems in Charlottesville, Norfolk, and Warren County. On September 4, Governor Almond stripped all local school boards and school district superintendents throughout the state of their authority to assign pupils, and ordered the school boards of the three jurisdictions to refuse to assign any black students to white schools. A day later, a federal court ordered the immediate integration of Warren County public schools. On September 11, invoking the Stanley plan's school closure provisions, Governor Almond closed the Warren County public school system. Charlottesville schools were closed on September 17, and Norfolk schools closed September 30. Parents of African American students immediately sued to have the school closure laws invalidated. On January 18, 1959, the Supreme Court of Virginia held in Harrison v. Day, that the school closing law violated Section 129 of the Virginia constitution (which required the state to "maintain an efficient system of public free schools throughout the State"). The very same day, the U.S. District Court for the Eastern District of Virginia held in James v. Almond that the school closing statute violated the 14th Amendment to the U.S. Constitution.

Faced with overwhelming court opposition to the Stanley plan, Almond announced a major policy shift. Almond had first signaled that he intended to abandon "massive resistance" in September 1958 after the first wave of school closings. But public opinion had yet to coalesce against "massive resistance". By January, with even Virginia courts siding against the state and citizens increasingly angry that their children's education was being sacrificed to maintain segregation, Almond concluded that the Stanley plan was no longer viable.

On January 28, 1959, speaking before a special joint session of the Virginia Assembly, Governor Almond announced that Virginia was powerless to prevent school desegregation. Speaking slowly from a typewritten script and with obvious deep emotion, Almond declared "Virginia has not surrendered and does not surrender now", but then said he would not use the police power of the state to try to force schools to stay segregated. (This was an obvious reference to the incident in which Arkansas Governor Orval Faubus called out the Arkansas National Guard to bar nine African American students from enrolling at Little Rock Central High School in 1957. The students were admitted only after President Dwight Eisenhower placed the Arkansas National Guard under federal control, and had the students escorted into the high school by the United States Army's 101st Airborne Division.) Almond asked the legislature to repeal all aspects of the Stanley plan which had been overturned by the courts, repeal the state's compulsory school attendance law, adopt a $3 million tuition grant program to allow students to attend segregated private schools of their choice, and strengthen the penalty for threatening to bomb a church, school, or other meeting place. Almond also announced a study of Section 129 of the Virginia Constitution, a political gesture that was never seriously pursued. Almond's program became known by some as "passive resistance" and "freedom of choice" (although it is also sometimes called "tokenism" or "containment"), a legislative approach intended to shift Virginia toward desegregation in the face of a hostile electorate.

On February 2, 1959, Governor Almond refused to intervene as 17 African American students in Norfolk and four in Arlington County peacefully enrolled in formerly all-white schools. Historians generally list this date as the end of "massive resistance."

Almond later said of his time as governor: "I lived in hell."

=== "Passive resistance" and the end of legal segregation in Virginia ===
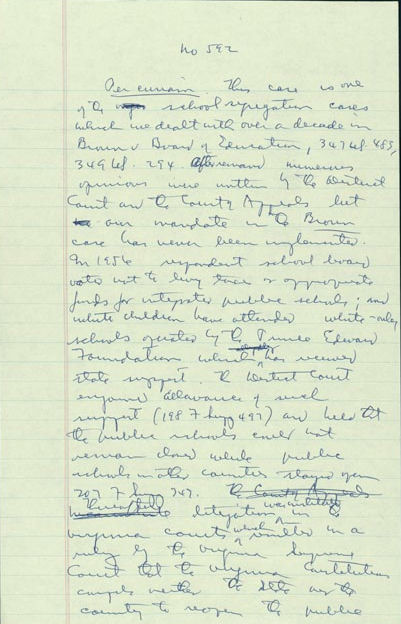
The first page of Justice William O. Douglas' draft of the decision in Griffin v. School Board of Prince Edward County.

"Passive resistance" greatly slowed the pace of school desegregation in Virginia. Legislation enacted by the Assembly placed the burden on often-poor African American parents to "prove" that their child should be enrolled in an all-white school. (For example, a black family had to prove that the all-white school was physically closer than the all-black school their child was enrolled in. An actual, physical measurement had to be submitted.) By the time Almond left office in 1962, only 1% of Virginia's schools had integrated. By 1964, it had risen to 5%.

The last vestiges of the Stanley plan were swept aside by the U.S. Supreme Court in 1964. The case involved the Prince Edward County public school system. Prince Edward County was one of the Southside counties. In 1951, the NAACP filed suit on behalf of African American children in Prince Edward County demanding racial integration of the public schools. The U.S. Supreme Court consolidated the case, Davis v. County School Board of Prince Edward County, with Brown v. Board of Education, and as part of its ruling in Brown ordered that the Prince Edward County public schools integrate. By 1959, a second lawsuit was working its way through the federal court system in Virginia, and this suit seemed likely to force the county's schools to integrate in time for the 1959-1960 school term. On June 3, 1959, Prince Edward County officials voted to defund and close their public school system. It became the first school system in the nation to close rather than integrate. White parents subsequently contributed funds to establish an all-white private school, the Prince Edward County Free School. Poor African American parents were unable (and unwilling) to establish a similar school, and sued to have the public schools reopened. On January 6, 1964, the U.S. Supreme Court finally agreed to hear their case. The United States Department of Justice, citing the "extraordinary history" of the Prince Edward County case, intervened to support the black parents. On May 25, 1964, the U.S. Supreme unanimously held in Griffin v. County School Board of Prince Edward County, that Prince Edward County's school closure violated the 14th Amendment to the U.S. Constitution and ordered the public schools reopened immediately. The high court also struck down the tuition grants program, concluding that providing the grants while schools were closed violated the 14th Amendment. On June 1, the Supreme Court agreed to send its order to the district court in Richmond immediately, rather than through normal procedures (which would have delayed action by three weeks). On June 2, the federal district court in Richmond ordered the schools opened. Prince Edward County officials refused to obey the court's orders, and on June 17 the district court threatened to have county officials imprisoned. Prince Edward County officials bowed to the court's authority, and agreed to reopen the county's public schools on June 23, 1964.

The pace of desegregation in Virginia quickened significantly after the Supreme Court's ruling in Griffin. Passage of the federal Civil Rights Act of 1964 also greatly assisted this process. On May 27, 1968, the U.S. Supreme Court unanimously held in Green v. County School Board of New Kent County, that Almond's "freedom of choice" plan violated the 14th Amendment. The ruling led to the collapse of "passive resistance" and to the integration of nearly all public schools throughout the state.

=== The NAACP cases ===
The legal business statutes enacted as part of the Stanley plan did not survive either.

The Virginia NAACP filed suit in federal court in 1956 to have the five barratry, champerty, and maintenance laws thrown out as an unconstitutional infringement of the 1st Amendment rights of freedom of speech and freedom of assembly. A three-judge panel of a U.S. District Court for the Eastern District of Virginia agreed that three of the laws were unconstitutional, but reserved judgment on the other two laws pending interpretation by state courts (which had not yet ruled on the laws' legality). Both the state and the NAACP appealed. In Harrison v. NAACP, the U.S. Supreme Court ruled 6-to-3 that the district court should have withheld judgment until state courts had considered the issue first.

The NAACP then brought suit challenging all five laws in state court. A state circuit court held three of the laws unconstitutional, but upheld the barratry law and the law prohibiting advocacy of lawsuits against the state. On appeal, the Virginia Supreme Court struck down the anti-advocacy law as well, but upheld the barratry law. In a 6-to-3 ruling in 1963 that gave broad protection to public interest legal organizations, the U.S. Supreme Court in NAACP v. Button, held that all five of the barratry, champerty, and maintenance laws violated the 1st and 14th Amendments to the constitution.

=== Thomson committee ===
The Stanley plan also established a committee to investigate race relations and integration in Virginia. This committee was officially titled the Virginia Committee on Law Reform and Racial Activities, but was publicly known as the "Thomson Committee" after its chair, Delegate James McIlhany Thomson. In 1954, David Scull (a printer in Annandale, Virginia) began publishing pro-integration literature on behalf of a number of organizations in Virginia. The Fairfax Citizens' Council, a group opposed to desegregation, publicized Scull's role in the printing of the literature in 1957. Scull was subpoenaed to appear before the Thomson Committee, and subjected to an aggressive series of questions (many of which did not pertain to the committee's legal charge). Scull refused to answer some of these questions, and the committee went to court to force him to answer. A state circuit court ruled against Scull and ordered him to answer the questions. He refused, and was convicted of contempt of court.

Scull appealed his conviction to the U.S. Supreme Court. In a unanimous ruling in May 1959, the high court held in Scull v. Virginia ex rel. Comm. on Law Reform and Racial Activities that the conviction violated Scull's 14th Amendment rights to due process because the committee's inquiry was so vague and so confusing that Scull could not tell what he was being asked.

== See also ==
- Sibley Commission

== Bibliography ==
- Anzalone, Christopher A. Supreme Court Cases on Political Representation, 1787-2001. Armonk, N.Y.: M.E. Sharpe, 2002.
- Bartley, Numan V. The Rise of Massive Resistance: Race and Politics in the South During the 1950s. Baton Rouge, La.: Louisiana State University Press 1999.
- Bass, Jack and DeVries, Walter. The Transformation of Southern Politics: Social Change and Political Consequence Since 1945. Athens, Ga.: University of Georgia Press, 1995.
- Dickson, Del. The Supreme Court in Conference, 1940-1985: The Private Discussions Behind Nearly 300 Supreme Court Decisions. New York: Oxford University Press, 2001.
- Diehl, Huston. Dream Not of Other Worlds: Teaching in a Segregated Elementary School, 1970. Iowa City, Ia.: University of Iowa Press, 2007.
- Duke, Daniel Linden. Education Empire: The Evolution of an Excellent Suburban School System. Albany, N.Y.: State University of New York Press, 2005.
- Duke, Daniel Linden. The School That Refused to Die: Continuity and Change at Thomas Jefferson High School. Albany, N.Y.: State University of New York Press, 1995.
- Gates, Robbins Ladew. The Making of Massive Resistance: Virginia's Politics of Public School Desegregation, 1954-1956. Chapel Hill, N.C.: University of North Carolina Press, 1964.
- Lassiter, Matthew D. and Lewis, Andrew B. The Moderates' Dilemma: Massive Resistance to School Desegregation in Virginia. Charlottesville, Va.: University Press of Virginia, 1998.
- Martin, Waldo E. 'Brown v. Board of Education': A Brief History With Documents. Boston, Mass.: St. Martin's, 1998.
- Mays, David J. Race, Reason, and Massive Resistance: The Diary of David J. Mays, 1954-1959. James R. Sweeney, ed. Athens, Ga.: University of Georgia Press, 2008.
- Morton, Richard Lee. Virginia Lives: The Old Dominion Who's Who. Hopkinsville, Ky.: Historical Record Association, 1964.
- Netherton, Nan. Fairfax County, Virginia: A History. Fairfax, Va.: Fairfax County Board of Supervisors, 1979.
- Patterson, James T. 'Brown v. Board of Education': A Civil Rights Milestone and Its Troubled Legacy. New York: Oxford University Press, 2001.
- Pratt, Robert A. The Color of Their Skin: Education and Race in Richmond Virginia, 1954-89. Charlottesville, Va.: University of Virginia Press, 1993.
- Ryan, James E. Five Miles Away, a World Apart: One City, Two Schools, and the Story of Educational Opportunity in Modern America. New York: Oxford University Press, 2010.
- Sarratt, Reed. The Ordeal of Desegregation: The First Decade. New York: Harper & Row, 1966.
- Smith, J. Douglas. "'When Reason Collides With Prejudice': Armistead Lloyd Boothe and the Politics of Moderation." In The Moderates' Dilemma: Massive Resistance to School Desegregation in Virginia. Charlottesville, Va.: University Press of Virginia, 1998.
- Sribnick, Ethan G. A Legacy of Innovation: Governors and Public Policy. Philadelphia: University of Pennsylvania Press, 2008.
- Sweeney James R. Jr., ed. Race, Reason, and Massive Resistance: The Diary of David J. Mays, 1954-1959. Athens, Ga.: University of Georgia Press, 2008.
- Thorndike, Joseph J. "'The Sometimes Sordid Level of Race and Segregation': James J. Kilpatrick and the Virginia Case against Brown." In The Moderates' Dilemma: Massive Resistance to School Desegregation in Virginia. Charlottesville, Va.: University Press of Virginia, 1998.
- Younger, Edward. The Governors of Virginia: 1860-1978. Charlottesville, Va.: University Press of Virginia, 1982.
- Wilkinson, J. Harvie III. Harry Byrd and the Changing Face of Virginia Politics, 1945-1966. Charlottesville, Va.: University Press of Virginia, 1968.
- Wolters, Raymond. The Burden of Brown: Thirty Years of School Desegregation. Knoxville, Tenn.: University of Tennessee Press, 1992.
