= C. Harrison Mann =

American politician

C. Harrison Mann Jr.

Member of the Virginia House of Delegates from the Arlington district
- In office 1954–1970
- Preceded by: George Damm
- Succeeded by: Vivian Kallen

Personal details
- Born: Charles Harrison Mann Jr. January 15, 1908 Mobile, Alabama, U.S.
- Died: November 28, 1977 (aged 69) Arlington, Virginia, U.S.
- Party: Democratic
- Spouse: Betty Hart Mann
- Education: University of Virginia

Military service
- Allegiance: United States
- Branch/service: United States Marine Corps
- Years of service: 1944-45
- Rank: lieutenant
- Battles/wars: Second World War

Charles Harrison Mann Jr. (January 15, 1908 – November 28, 1977, nicknamed "Hank") was a Virginia lawyer who served as a Democratic member of the Virginia House of Delegates representing Arlington, Virginia.

== Early and family life ==
Mann was born in Mobile, Alabama but only lived there six months, since his father worked for the L&N railroad and soon moved his family to Texas and then Florida. Hank spent his summers in Upperville, Virginia with his grandparents, and considered the Commonwealth his home state. His great, great, great grandfather was William Buckland, the master woodcarver of Gunston Hall and architect of colonial houses in Maryland. Mann attended Episcopal High School in Alexandria, Virginia, then the University of Virginia, from which he received both undergraduate and law (1931) degrees, and was a member of the Raven Society). In 1970, the university awarded him its outstanding alumnus award.

He married Betty Hart Mann on March 31, 1934, who survived him, as did their two daughters and five grandchildren.

== Legal and military careers ==
After graduation, Mann specialized in banking law and wrote a book and several articles.

During World War II, beginning in 1942 Mann organized the 113 Virginia Protective Force in Arlington (to replace the State Guard which had been called into active service) and served as its Captain, protecting the bridges across the Potomac River as well as National Airport, among other strategic locations. He entered the U.S. Marine Corps in 1944 as a Lieutenant and served at Mindanao in the Philippines, receiving a citation for his combat activity.

== Political career ==
Mann began his political career as delegate to the Arlington Federation of Civic Associations, and as chairman of the Arlington County Democratic Committee. He also served as President of the Northern Virginia Chapter of the University of Virginia Alumni Association, which helped organize support that eventually led to the 1953 recommendation to open George Mason College as a two-year institution of higher education.

Mann served (part-time) in the Virginia General Assembly, representing Arlington as a delegate from 1954 until 1970. In his last seven terms, Mann sponsored more bills than any other member of the General Assembly, and passed more bills than any other Northern Virginia delegate.

Mann was the named plaintiff in the reapportionment case Davis v. Mann, concerning the reapportionment after the 1960 census and during Virginia's Massive Resistance crisis (although Arlington acceded to a court order in 1959). Other named plaintiffs were Kathryn H. Stone also of Arlington County, and John A. K. Donovan and John C. Webb of Fairfax County. The United States Supreme Court ultimately decided the case in favor of Mann and his fellow northern Virginians in 1964. During the resulting reapportionment, Northern Virginia received five more delegates in the General Assembly, as well as one additional state senator.

Mann considered his greatest legislative accomplishment the creation of George Mason University in northern Virginia, and he sponsored the bills that created George Mason College as a branch of the University of Virginia and later elevating it to a four-year university with the right to grant degrees and offer graduate programs. He also served on its first Board of Control, and later on its Board of Visitors (1975–77). Other education-related bills Mann sponsored created Virginia's State Educational Assistance Authority, and made millions of dollars available to construct public schools throughout the commonwealth. He also sponsored bills to provide for statewide driver education and medical assistance to the elderly, as well as to ban obscene literature and billboards on Virginia's highways. Mann led efforts to complete Interstate 66 inside the beltway, despite opposition from within Arlington.

In the March 1969 special election after the death of his mentor, State Senator Charles R. Fenwick, Mann ran for that seat, but unexpectedly lost to Republican M. Patton Echols, whom he had defeated during his 1963 delegate reelection campaign. This proved to be the start of a Republican tide that devastated the local Democratic party that fall. Republicans led by George Mason Green Jr. swept Mann's successor Vivian Kallen and the other three Arlington Democratic delegates to the Virginia house aside. However, in 1971 his fellow delegate Mary A. R. Marshall and fellow Democrat John L. Melnick won with Republican Green, and two years after that (and for years to come) Democrats regained all Arlington seats in the House of Delegates. Neither Mann nor fellow Democrats Wallace G. Dickson nor William M. Lightsey ran again.

Mann also was the first President of the Arlington Historical Society and chairman of the Virginia Chapter of Americans for Effective Law Enforcement. Other memberships included the Virginia, District of Columbia and Supreme Court bars, as well as the American Legion, Veterans of Foreign Wars, Crippled Children's Society, Northern Virginia Mental Health Association, Virginia Council on Health and Medical Car and Children's Home Society of Virginia.

== Death and legacy ==
Mann died of cancer after a long illness, and was buried in Upperville. A memorial service was held at Emmanuel Episcopal Church in Alexandria, Virginia. Mann had previously led the state fundraising for the American Cancer Society. His papers and some of his collection of rare maps, were donated to and are currently housed at the Special Collections Research Center at the Fenwick Library at George Mason University.

Virginia House of Delegates
| Preceded by George Damm | Representing Arlington County; 1954–1970 | Succeeded by Vivian Kallen |
