= Davis v. Mann =

- Supreme Court of the United States

Argued November 14, 18, 1963 Decided June 15, 1964
- Full case name: Levin Nock Davis, Secretary of the State Board of Elections, et al. v. Harrison Mann, et al.
- Citations: 377 U.S. 678 (more) 84 S. Ct. 1441; 12 L. Ed. 2d 609; 1964 U.S. LEXIS 1005

Case history
- Prior: Mann v. Davis, 213 F. Supp. 577 (E.D. Va. 1962)
- Subsequent: Mann v. Davis, 245 F. Supp. 241 (E.D. Va. 1965)

Holding
- The Court struck down Virginia's state legislative district inequality, basing their decision on the principle of "one person, one vote."

Court membership
- Chief Justice Earl Warren Associate Justices Hugo Black · William O. Douglas; Tom C. Clark · John M. Harlan II; William J. Brennan Jr. · Potter Stewart; Byron White · Arthur Goldberg

Case opinions
- Majority: Warren, joined by Black, Douglas, Clark, Brennan, White, Goldberg
- Concurrence: Stewart
- Dissent: Harlan

Laws applied
- U.S. Const. amend. XIV, Equal Protection Clause

Davis v. Mann, 377 U.S. 678 (1964), was a United States Supreme Court which was one of a series of cases decided in 1964 that ruled that state legislature districts had to be roughly equal in population.

David J. Mays and Robert McIlwaine advocated on behalf of the Commonwealth of Virginia; Edmund D. Campbell and Henry E. Howell Jr. advocated on behalf of the plaintiff Northern Virginia legislators. The Supreme Court issued the opinion in this case along with Reynolds v. Sims and cites that the opinion.

== Background ==
Voters from Arlington County and Fairfax County, Virginia represented by Edmund D. Campbell challenged the apportionment of the Virginia General Assembly. Voters from Norfolk, Virginia represented by Henry E. Howell Jr. were permitted to intervene as plaintiffs. On appeal, the United States (represented by Solicitor General Archibald Cox) intervened as amicus curiae to support the appellees.

Under the 1962 redistricting statute, in order to keep counties and cities wholly in a district, there were wide disparities in the population of Senate and House of Delegates districts. Arlington County, for example (where Campbell and plaintiff legislators Harrison Mann and Kathryn Stone lived), was apportioned one senator for its 163,401 persons, only 0.61 of the representation to which it would be entitled on a strict population basis, while the smallest senatorial district, with respect to population, had only 61,730, and the next smallest 63,703. The District Court found "that the maximum population-variance ratio between the most populous and least populous senatorial districts is 2.65-to-1. Under the 1962 senatorial apportionment, applying 1960 population figures, approximately 41.1% of the State's total population reside in districts electing a majority of the members of that body."

== Opinion of the Court ==
Having already overturned its ruling that redistricting was a purely political question in Baker v. Carr, 369 U.S. 186 (1962), the Court went further in order to correct what seemed to it to be egregious examples of malapportionment which were serious enough to undermine the premises underlying republican government. Before Reynolds, urban counties and cities, like those in which the plaintiffs resided, were often drastically underrepresented in state legislatures. This was presented as one of the defenses of the Commonwealth, but the Court rejected this defense, saying "Not only does this explanation lack legal merit, but it also fails to conform to the facts. Some Virginia urban areas, such as Richmond, by comparison with Arlington, Fairfax and Norfolk, appear to be quite adequately represented in the General Assembly."

The Virginia case also presented a different argument regarding the presence of large numbers of military personnel in the affected city and counties. However, the court reject appellants' argument dismissing it as a post-hoc explanation, saying there was no evidence that the legislature considered military personnel in drawing the 1962 districts.

Justice Potter Stewart issued a concurrence, in which he argued that wide disparities in population could be constitutional if the Commonwealth could articulate non-discriminatory reasons, but held that the Commonwealth could advance "no rational basis for the disfavoring of Arlington, Fairfax and Norfolk."

Justice John Marshall Harlan II reiterated and adopted his dissent in Reynolds v. Sims.

== Subsequent developments ==
The Commonwealth of Virginia redrew its legislative districts so that they were equipopulous, based on the 1960 decennial census data, in time for the 1967 elections.

== See also ==
- One person, one vote
- Rotten borough, an English phenomenon
