= Peter Winston =

Peter Winston may refer to:

- Peter Winston (politician) (1836–1920), American physician and Democratic politician
- Peter Winston (chess player) (born 1958), American chess player who disappeared in the 1970s
- Winston Peters (born 1945), New Zealand politician
