= Senator Watkins (disambiguation) =

Arthur Vivian Watkins (1886–1973) was a U.S. Senator from Utah from 1947 to 1959. Senator Watkins may also refer to:

- Asa D. Watkins (1856–1938), Virginia State Senate
- G. Harold Watkins (1903–1991), Pennsylvania State Senate
- George Watkins (politician) (1902–1970), Pennsylvania State Senate
- John Watkins (Virginia politician, born 1947), Virginia State Senate
- John B. Watkins (1855–1931), Virginia State Senate
- J. D. Watkins (1828–1895), Louisiana State Senate
- L. Whitney Watkins (1873–1950), Michigan State Senate
- Nathaniel W. Watkins (1796–1876), Missouri State Senate
- Wes Watkins (1938–2025), Oklahoma State Senate
- William Wirt Watkins (1826–1898), Arkansas State Senate
