= Senator Flood =

Senator Flood may refer to:

- Henry D. Flood (1865–1921), Virginia State Senate
- Mike Flood (politician) (born 1975), Nebraska State Senate
- Patrick Flood (born 1951), Maine State Senate
- Thomas H. Flood (1804–1873), Virginia State Senate
