= Annie Steger Winston =

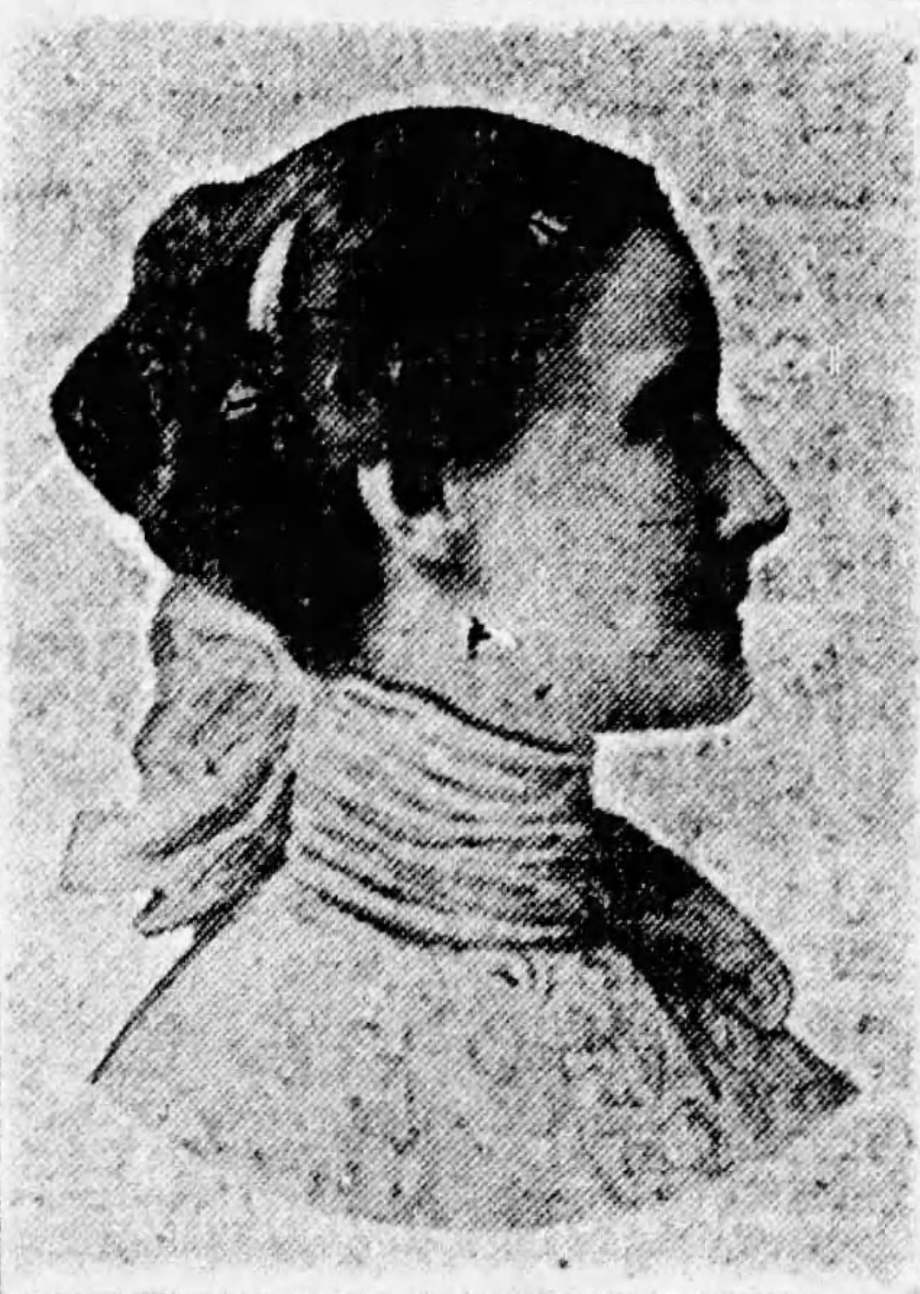
- Winston in 1903
- Born: September 20, 1862 Richmond, Virginia, U.S.
- Died: May 12, 1927 (aged 64) Richmond, Virginia
- Resting place: Hollywood Cemetery
- Occupation: Writer
- Genre: Novels, short stories, essays, plays, and critical pieces
- Notable works: Memoirs of a Child; "Melinda’s Encumbrance"
- Relatives: Peter Fontaine; Patrick Henry

Annie Steger Winston (1862–1927) was an American writer from Virginia. She wrote novels, short stories, essays, plays, and critical pieces, contributing to prominent periodicals. Her dialect story, "Melinda’s Encumbrance", was well received and led to other writing opportunities. Winston published two books, Memoirs of a Child (1903) and The Deeper Voice (1923), and was active in her state's literary community through the Virginia Writers' Club.

== Early life and education ==
Annie Steger Winston was born at Richmond, Virginia, (Note: According to Whittle (Richmond Times-Dispatch, 1903), Annie was born in Amelia County, Virginia, while her infancy, as well as her childhood and subsequent life, were spent in Richmond.) on September 20, 1862.

Her parents were Charles Henry and Annie ("Nannie") (Steger) Winston. Charles was a professor physics and astronomy at Richmond College. He was a descendant of Rev. Peter Fontaine, first rector of Westover Church Westover Parish, Charles City County, Virginia; of Richard Cocks, a three-time member of the House of Burgesses; and of Patrick Henry through his mother, a Miss Winston. Nanie was a daughter of Major John Steger, of Amelia County, Virginia, was of German descent, her great-grandfather having emigrated to the U.S. from that country. Annie's siblings included Kate, Daisy, Lula, charles, Peter, and Geddes.

Winston attended the public schools of Richmond. Early on, finding school to be boring, she developed a skill for mental abstraction from its routine. The most that she realized from this experience was the ability to read. One of her earliest recollections was of sitting down with the book, History of the World, and resolving to read it through, thinking that by so doing, she could obtain all human knowledge. She began writing in rhyme as a child.

After leaving school, she took private lessons from three Richmond-area artists, Edward Virginius Valentine (sculptor), John Adams Elder (painter), and William Ludlow Sheppard (watercolorist).

== Career ==
Winston's first printed compositions were in verse. A poem was accepted by The Century and a story, "Tucker's Tour", appeared in Harper's Weekly in March 1895. Together, they these induced Winston to take up literature as a profession. "Tucker's Tour" was quickly followed by "A Cooperative Courtship", in Scribner's Other stories and articles appeared in The Atlantic, The Bookman, The Century, The Chautauquan, the Independent, Lippincott's Monthly, Outlook, and prominent women's periodicals such as Harper's Bazaar. The production which attracted the most attention was a dialect story, "Melinda's Encumbrance", which appeared in the Sunday School Times, of Philadelphia. Widely copied and complimented, it brought requests for contributions from some of the most prominent publications in the country, the editor of the Ladies' Home Journal, in particular having characterized it as "a masterpiece, a statuette in bronze".

Although her work was mainly in the line of fiction, Winston thought her forte was as an essayist, such as her "America as a Field for Fiction" (The Arena, 1900). The germ of her first book, Memoirs of a Child (1903) was contained in two contributions of that character to Lippincott's Magazine, entitled the "Fantastic Terror of Childhood" and "The Book Which Most Benefitted Me". the reception of these led to kindred productions brought out by the Kindergarten Review, of Springfield, Massachusetts, and these in turn to the finished book, which was favorably reviewed by The New York Times, It was adopted as a textbook in a number of colleges; some educators referred to this book as a classic. Her novel, The Deeper Voice, was published in 1923. She described it as: "The way to a trust in God which is the sole antidote for that distrust of life which has fallen upon men".

Winston was also the author of several one-act plays. Her career also included critical and dramatic work.

In 1887, Winston wrote but did not publish a story regarding mind cures, faith cures, and the like. Edward Eggleston read the manuscript and, finding its motive to be suggestive, he bought Winston out, wrote his own novel without following the lines of Winston's story, and published The Faith Doctor. A Story of New York in 1891.

Winston did not write regularly, but only when she had an idea. Then she described herself as being seized with a sort of hunger for writing, going to her desk immediately after breakfast, and again after lunch, and remaining until dark.

Winston belonged to the Woman's Club of Richmond and the Virginia Writers' Club, giving many author readings before the latter organization.

== Personal life ==
In religion, she was Baptist, a parishioner at the First Baptist Church of Richmond, Virginia.

Winston never married. She died at her home in Richmond, Virginia, on May 12, 1927. Interment was at that city's Hollywood Cemetery.

== Selected works ==
=== Books ===
- Memoirs of a Child, 1903
- The Deeper Voice, 1923

=== Essays ===
- "America as a Field for Fiction", The Arena, 1900
- "Fantastic Terror of Childhood", Lippincott's Magazine
- "The Book Which Most Benefitted Me", Lippincott's Magazine
- "The Democracy of Fiction", Lippincott's Magazine, 1898
- "Who is your Favorite Author?", Williams Literary Monthly, 1898

=== Poetry ===
- "A Ballad of the Balladist", The Century Illustrated Monthly Magazine, 1898
- "A Ballad of Paper Fans", Scribner's Monthly, 1891

=== Short stories ===
- "A Co-operative Courtship", Scribner's Magazine, 1895
- "Tucker's Tour", Harper's Weekly, 1895
- "Melinda’s Encumbrance"
- "The Pleasures of Bad Taste", Lippincott's Monthly Magazine, 1895
