= Pierre Fontaine =

Pierre Fontaine may refer to:

- Pierre Fontaine (composer) (c. 1380 – c.1450), French composer of the Burgundian school
- Peter Fontaine (born Pierre Fontaine; 1691–1757), Virginia clergyman
- Pierre François Léonard Fontaine (1762–1853), neoclassical French architect
- Pierre Fontaine, former leader of the Communist Party of Quebec
