= Emerson College (disambiguation) =

Emerson College is a private college in Boston, Massachusetts, United States

Emerson College may also refer to:

- Emerson College (UK) in East Sussex, England
- Emerson Institute in Mobile, Alabama, US
