= Agnes Sarah Bell Cabell =

First Lady of Virginia

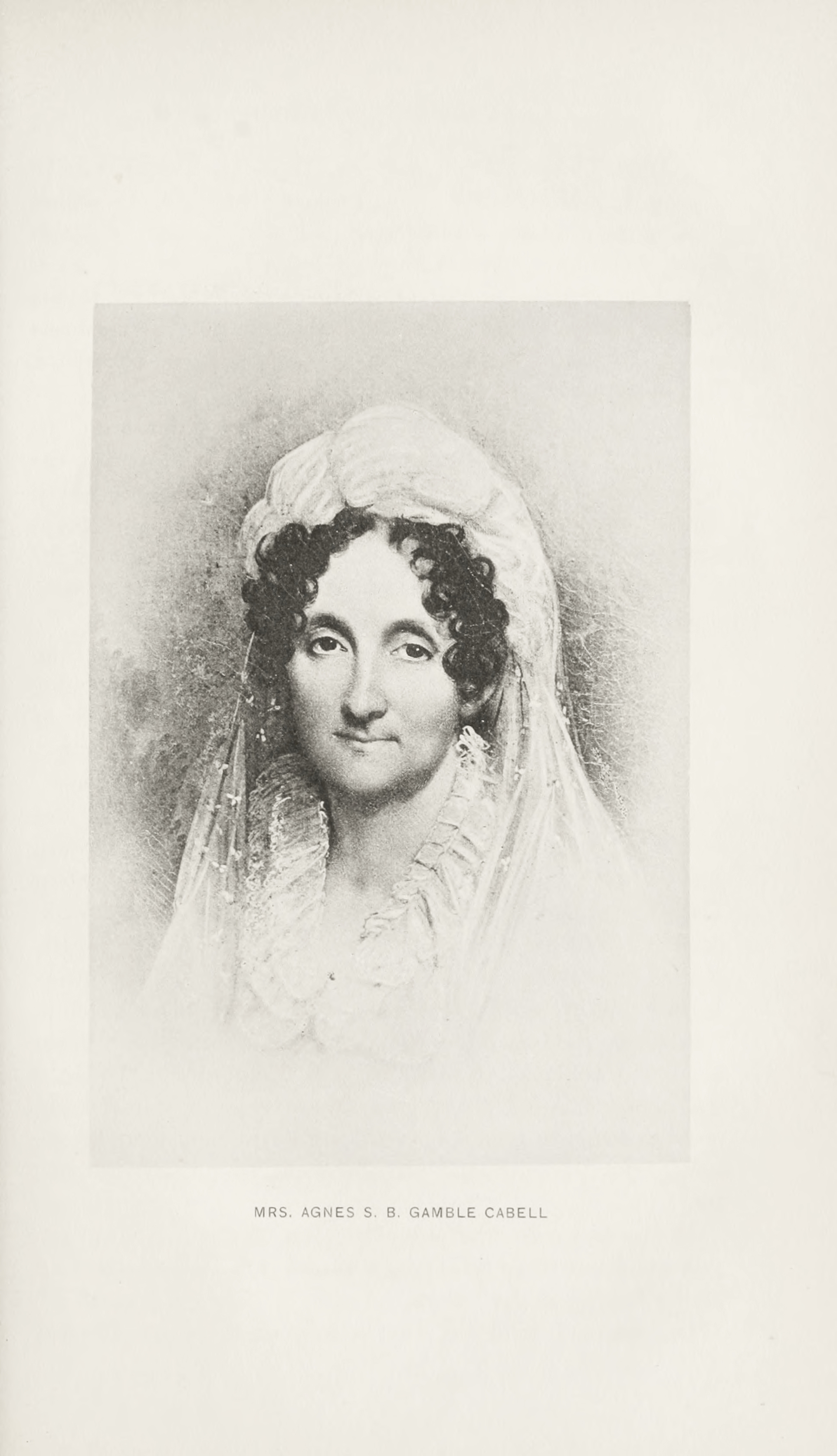

First Lady of Virginia
- In role December 7, 1805 – December 1, 1808
- Governor: William H. Cabell
- Preceded by: Margaret Lowther Page
- Succeeded by: Elizabeth Monroe

Personal details
- Born: Agnes Sarah Bell Gamble; August 22, 1783 Augusta County, Virginia, U.S.
- Died: February 15, 1863 (aged 79) Richmond, Virginia, U.S.
- Resting place: Shockoe Hill Cemetery; Richmond, Virginia, U.S.
- Party: Democratic-Republican
- Spouse: William H. Cabell
- Children: 7, including Edward and Henry

Agnes Sarah Bell Cabell (August 22, 1783 – February 15, 1863) was the First Lady of Virginia from 1805 to 1808 as the wife of the fourteenth governor, William H. Cabell.

== Early life ==
Agnes was born on August 22, 1783, in Augusta County, Virginia. Her father was Robert Gamble, who had served as a colonel during the American Revolutionary War. She attended Parson Blair's Female Seminary in Richmond and resided at Gambles Hill.

Cabell was a devout Presbyterian, and while in the role of First Lady, she was involved in charitable endeavors including visiting hospitals and charities to the poor. Cabell was also highly involved in Richmond and Washington society.

== Marriage ==
On March 11, 1805, she married Cabell, the then governor-elect of Virginia. Their children included:

- Emma Catherine Cabell Carrington (1808–1887)
- Robert Gamble Cabell (1809–1889)
- Elizabeth Hannah Cabell Daniel (1811–1892)
- William Wirt Cabell (1813–1891)
- Edward Carrington Cabell (1816–1896), who moved to Florida and served in its legislature, as well as the U.S. Congress.
- John Grattan Cabell (1817–1896)
- Henry Coalter Cabell (1820–1889), Civil War Confederate Army Officer who later served as director of the Central Railroad, the Chesapeake and Ohio Railroad, and the James River Canal Company, and judge of the Virginia Court of Appeals

In 1840, the Cabell household comprised seven free white persons and ten slaves (2 adult men, 4 boys under age 10, and 4 adult women).

== Death and legacy ==
Cabell died in 1863 aged 79. She is interred at Shockoe Hill Cemetery in Richmond.

=== Descendants ===
Cabell's grandsons included James Alston Cabell, Grand Master of the Masonic Lodge of Virginia, and Isaac Carrington, provost marshal for the city of Richmond during the American Civil War. Her granddaughter was Katherine Hamilton Claiborne, President of the National Society of the Colonial Dames of America. Her great-grandsons included American novelist James Branch Cabell and 49th Governor of Maryland Albert Cabell Ritchie.
