= George Damm =

American politician

Member of the Virginia House of Delegates from the Arlington district
- In office 1946–1954
- Preceded by: Charles R. Fenwick
- Succeeded by: C. Harrison Mann

Personal details
- Born: February 23, 1896 Roxbury, Massachusetts, U.S.
- Died: March 19, 1964 (aged 68) Arlington, Virginia
- Party: Democratic
- Spouse: Edna Martha Thelander
- Education: Emerson Institute; National University School of Law

Military service
- Allegiance: United States
- Branch/service: United States Army
- Unit: 111th Field Artillery, 29th Division
- Battles/wars: First World War

George Damm (February 23, 1896 – March 19, 1964) was a civil engineer and later attorney who served as a Democratic member of the Virginia House of Delegates representing Arlington County from 1946 to 1954.

== Early and family life ==
Damm was born in Roxbury, Massachusetts on February 23, 1896. He was educated in the Boston Public Schools, and graduated from the Emerson Institute in Washington, DC. Damm was a World War I veteran, who served in the 111th Field Artillery, 29th Division. He married Edna Martha Thelander March 29, 1923; they ultimately adopted a son and daughter.

== Career ==
In 1926, the Damms moved to Arlington, Virginia, where George Dam became Assistant Superintendent during construction of the Lincoln Memorial Bridge across the Potomac River. When the job was completed, he found another as Chief Deputy to Arlington's Commissioner of Revenue.

1944, Damm obtained his law degree from the National University School of Law.

Damm practiced law in Arlington, Virginia. In 1945, after Arlington's delegate Charles R. Fenwick was elected to the Virginia Senate, Damm ran for the open Arlington House of Delegates seat (a part-time position) and was elected. He served alongside J. Maynard Magruder for four terms, but did not seek re-election as the Massive Resistance crisis began in 1953, when C. Harrison Mann was elected to succeed him.

Damm was very involved in civic organizations, including the Masons, the American Legion, Kiwanis Club, the Arlington County Democratic Club, and the Social Hygiene Society of Arlington. He was also Vice-chairman of the Arlington Red Cross.

== Death and legacy ==
Damm died of cancer on March 19, 1964, and was interred at Arlington National Cemetery in his adopted home. He was survived by an adopted a son, Lawrence J. Stamp, and a daughter, Cecile Alice Stamp.

Virginia House of Delegates
Preceded by Charles R. Fenwick	Representing Arlington County; 1946–1954	Succeeded by C. Harrison Mann
