= Sidney Smith Baxter =

American lawyer (1802–1879)

Attorney General of Virginia
- In office December 11, 1834 – January 1, 1852
- Preceded by: John Robertson
- Succeeded by: Willis Perry Bocock

Personal details
- Born: November 18, 1802 Lexington, Virginia
- Died: December 7, 1879 (aged 77) Jeffersonville, Tazewell, Virginia, U.S.
- Spouse: Anna Boucher Nicholls (d. 1846)
- Children: 7 (but only one survived him)
- Education: Washington College (became Washington and Lee University in his lifetime)

Sidney Smith Baxter (November 18, 1802 – December 7, 1879) was a Virginia lawyer who served as Attorney General of Virginia from 1834 until 1852, and who later worked as a commissioner for the Confederate Secretary of War investigating claims of political persecution, particularly in the Commonwealth's western regions.

== Early and family life ==
Probably the third of four sons born to the former Annie Christian Fleming and her husband Rev. George A. Baxter, he had eight siblings. His father's family had emigrated from Ireland, and his father graduated from Liberty Hall Academy (chartered as Washington College in 1813 and which became Washington and Lee University), before becoming an ordained Presbyterian minister, then professor of mathematics, natural philosophy and languages at his alma mater before becoming the institution's president. His maternal grandfather William Fleming had served as Virginia's governor during the American Revolutionary War, but died before this grandson's birth. Sidney Baxter graduated from his father's college in 1821, then read law with attorneys in Lexington.

On October 8, 1829, Baxter married Lexington resident Anna Boucher Nicholls. They had seven children, of whom five survived infancy, but his wife and youngest daughter died days apart in August 1846 while Baxter was attending a session of the Virginia Court of Appeals in Lewisburg. In the 1840 federal census, the family lived in Richmond and owned seven slaves. Both his sons died as a result of their Confederate service, one killed in action in 1862 and the other succumbed in 1867 to jail fever contracted while at the federal prison in Elmira, New York. Another daughter died while visiting Baxter in 1871.

== Career ==
Admitted to the Rockbridge County bar in 1823, he had a private legal practice in the county, district and circuit courts in Rockbridge and adjoining counties.

=== Attorney General of Virginia ===
On December 11, 1834, the Virginia General Assembly elected Baxter as attorney general of Virginia. With the support of a coalition of western Virginia Democrats and Whigs, Baxter defeated Congressman John Mercer Patton by four votes. At the time, the office had limited powers, and a correspondingly limited salary, principally ordinary attorneys fees for appearances in court. However, in 1835, the Virginia General Assembly passed a law requiring the attorney general to issue written opinions whenever requested by Virginia's governor, an officer of the Commonwealth, or any of the public boards. He also appeared as counsel for the Commonwealth in all cases in which the Commonwealth was interested, either in the eastern or western courts of appeal or in the general court, or in the circuit court of law or chancery for Henrico county. Thus, most attorneys general also continued their private legal practices, which in Baxter's case involved association with Richmond attorney Henry Coalter Cabell, the son of Virginia governor William H. Cabell, who became a judge of the Virginia Court of Appeals. Baxter was ex officio a member of some of the state's governing board, probably the most important of which was the Board of Public Works. He alsohad a long involvement with the James River and Kanawha Company, and acted as proxy for Washington College at shareholder meetings in the 1830s before being elected to the board in his own right in 1838. He also was active in the Presbyterian Church and served as a trustee of Washington College from 1830 til 1856. An active Mason, he was grand master of the Grand Lodge of Virginia from 1846 til 1848. During the American Civil War discussed below, he was a member of Richmond Lodge No. 10. The Virginia Constitution of 1851 made the attorney general office elective, with a four-year term. Baxter was defeated by Democrat Willis P. Bocock in the November General election.

After his term of office expired, Baxter moved to Washington, D.C., and practiced in the federal courts, specializing in land claims.

=== Confederate service ===
Baxter returned to Richmond in early April 1861, as Virginia debated secession. In December he accepted a position as special commissioner under the Confederate secretary of war to investigate case of political prisoners held by the Confederacy. He feared that harsh or unfair treatment of western Virginians would increase disaffection there, but also examined the evidence of those accused of spying or as traitors. As the war continued, Baxter became involved in prisoner exchanges, as well as investigated conditions in Confederate military prisons, particularly near Richmond.

=== Postwar career ===
As the war ended, Baxter returned to Lexington and applied for a presidential pardon on July 12, 1865, which was granted. He then moved to Wytheville in southwestern Virginia, and re-established his law practice, eventually partnering with Sheldon Langley. Baxter also gave legal advice on railroad consolidation and construction. In the late 1860s he moved his legal practice to Marion in Smyth County, Virginia. Baxter published Free Masonry and the War: Report of the Committee under the Resolutions of 1862, Grand Lodge of Virginia in 1865, which strongly defended the Confederacy and southern freemasons. His essay on the history of Washington College was published posthumously.

== Death and legacy ==
Baxter retired in 1876 and went to live with his only surviving child. He died of a brain condition in Jeffersonville, the Tazewell County, Virginia seat (renamed to Tazewell in 1892) on December 7, 1879, and was buried with full Masonic honors. His letters are in the Stuart-Baldwin Family Papers held by the University of Virginia library, and the Robins and Faulkner family papers held by the Virginia Historical Society.
