= M. Patton Echols =

American politician (1925–2012)

M. Patton Echols Jr.

Member of the Virginia Senate from the 9th district
- In office 1969–1971
- Preceded by: Charles R. Fenwick
- Succeeded by: Clive L. DuVal II

Personal details
- Born: October 1, 1925 Honolulu, Hawaii, U.S.
- Died: July 26, 2012 (aged 86) Alexandria, Virginia, U.S.
- Resting place: University of Virginia Cemetery
- Party: Democratic (until 1963); Republican (1963–2012)
- Spouses: Susanne Stokes (m. 1956) Beth McLaren (m. 2005)
- Children: 4
- Education: University of Virginia
- Profession: Attorney

Marion Patton "Pat" Echols Jr. (October 1, 1925 – July 26, 2012) was an attorney in northern Virginia who served briefly as the only Republican to represent Arlington County in the Virginia Senate. He was also an unsuccessful candidate for Attorney General of Virginia in 1973.

== Early life ==
Echols was the son of Colonel Marion Patton Echols and Nancy Patterson McArthur. He was born October 1, 1925, in Honolulu in the U.S. territory of Hawaii. He married the former Susanne Stokes in 1956 and they raised two sons and two daughters in Arlington. They later divorced, and Echols married Beth McLaren in 2005.

== Political career ==
In 1963, Echols switched from the Democratic to the Republican Party and was one of three Republican candidates for the three House of Delegates seats allocated to Arlington and elected countywide, at-large. He came in fifth with 9,139 votes.

Longtime Virginia State Senator Charles R. Fenwick, who represented the 9th District, died in February 1969. In the snap special election that followed in March, Echols was elected as a Republican over the expected victor C. Harrison Mann. He served the balance of Fenwick's term. However, as a result of the decennial redistricting and creation of single-member districts in 1971, his old numbered district was moved to Richmond and he ran in the 31st District. Echols then lost to Democratic delegate Clive Duval, who would win re-election many times.

Republicans tapped Echols in 1973 for the "unenviable task" of running against popular incumbent Virginia Attorney General Andy Miller, and Miller won in a landslide.

== Later years ==
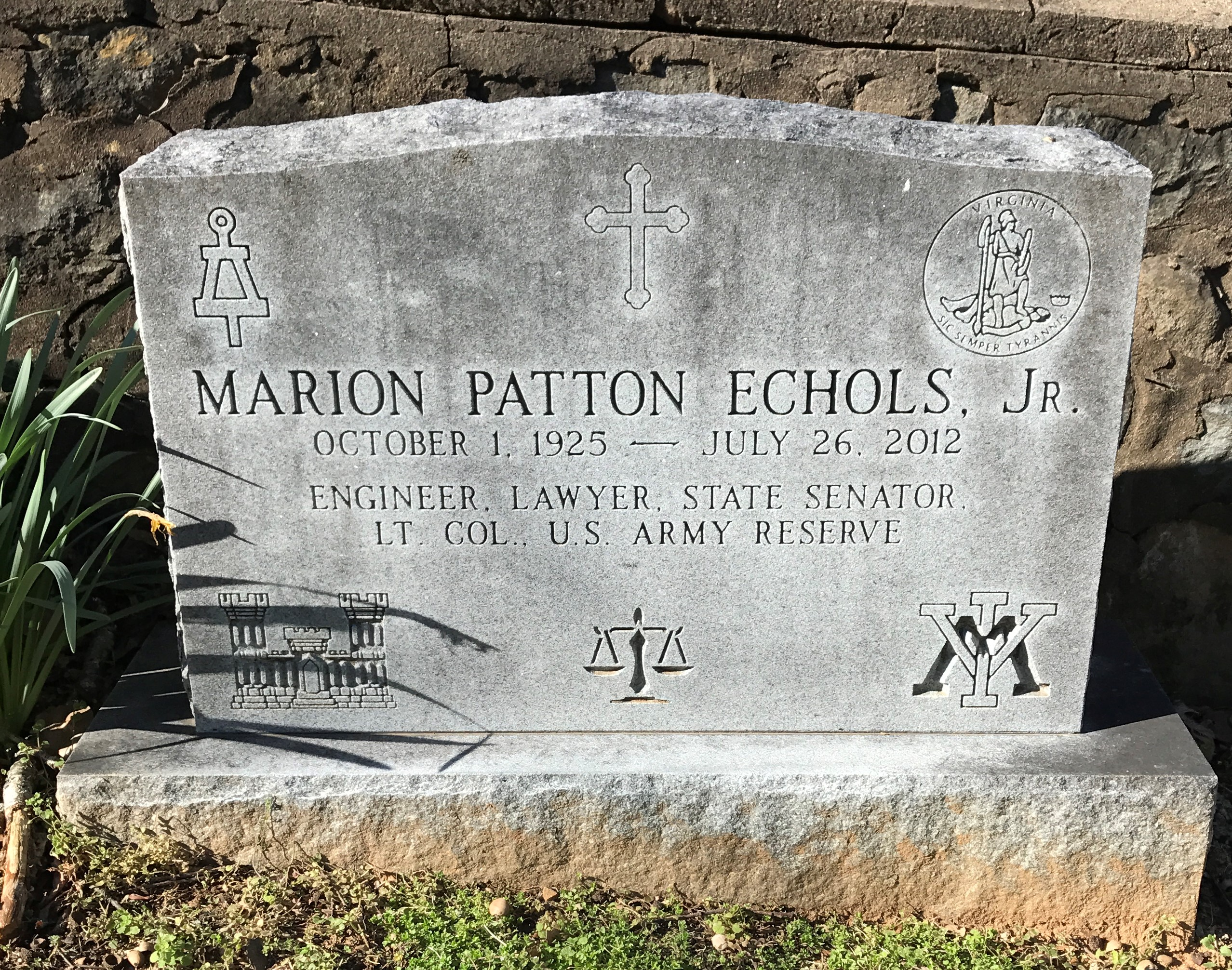
Echols's gravestone at the University of Virginia Cemetery in Charlottesville, Virginia

Echols practiced law for many years in Arlington and resided in McLean, Virginia. He died on July 26, 2012, and a memorial service was held at Grace Episcopal Church in Alexandria. He was buried at the University of Virginia Cemetery in Charlottesville.

Senate of Virginia
Preceded by Charles R. Fenwick	Virginia Senate, District 9; 1969–1972	Succeeded by Clive L. DuVal II (31st dist.)
