= Henry Coalter Cabell House =

Historic house in Virginia, United States

- U.S. National Register of Historic Places
- Virginia Landmarks Register
- Richmond City Historic District
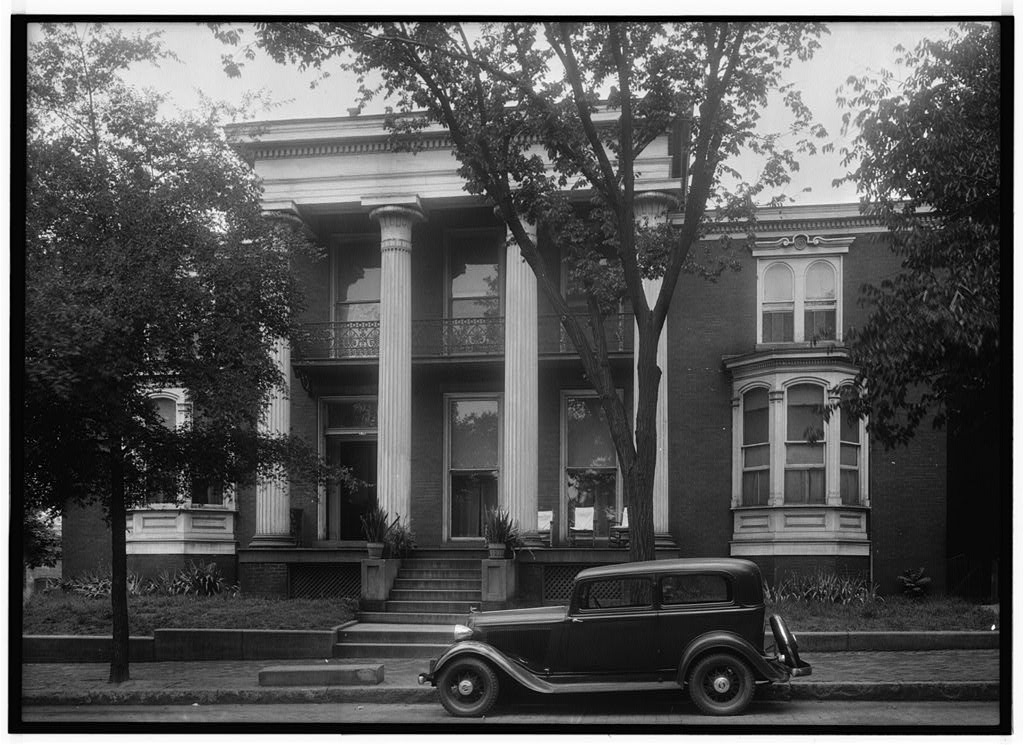
- Henry Coalter Cabell, HABS Photo

- Location within Virginia Location within the United States
- Location: 116 S. 3rd St., Richmond, Virginia
- Coordinates: 37°32′23″N 77°26′37″W
- Area: 9.9 acres (4.0 ha)
- Built: 1847
- Built by: George, William O.
- Architectural style: Greek Revival
- NRHP reference No.: 72001519
- VLR No.: 127-0225

Significant dates
- Added to NRHP: December 27, 1972
- Designated VLR: November 16, 1971

Henry Coalter Cabell House is a historic home located in Richmond, Virginia. Its name reflects the prominent Richmond attorney and Confederate officer Henry Coalter Cabell, who rented the elegant house for many years.

== Henry Coalter Cabell ==
The son of former Virginia governor William H. Cabell, who became a judge of the Virginia Court of Appeals, was an important figure in Richmond society for decades. Around the time he began to rent this house, his law partner was Virginia attorney general Sidney Smith Baxter, the grandson of former Virginia governor William Fleming, who after being defeated for re-election in 1852, moved to Washington, D.C. to practice land law.

From 1856 until his death, he served on the board of the Virginia Historical Society. He also served on the boards of the Chesapeake and Ohio Railway Company, the James River and Kanawha Company and the Virginia Central Railroad.

Cabell accepted his first military commission as major of the 1st Regiment Virginia Volunteers on December 1, 1857, and was promoted to captain of the 4th Regiment Virginia Artillery (a/k/a Fayette artillery) on December 21, 1859. A week after Virginia seceded, Cabell's artillery battery was activated and saw action at Gloucester Point in May. He received a promotion to lieutenant colonel of the 1st Regiment Virginia Artillery in September 1861. The following spring, he was promoted to artillery chief under John Bankhead Magruder and participated in the siege of Yorktown.

Cabell received a promotion to full colonel on July 4, 1862, and led an artillery battalion in Lafayette McLaw's division. That unit fought at the Battle of Antietam, the Battle of Fredericksburg at year-end, the Battle of Chancellorsville, and supported Pickett's charge at the Battle of Gettysburg. Col. Cabell commanded a First Corps artillery battalion at the Battles of the Wilderness, Spotsylvania Court House, North Anna and Cold Harbor, and several times at the Siege of Petersburg acted as chief of artillery. Several Confederate generals recommended that Cabell be made a brigadier general on March 30, 1865, but no vacancy existed so he never received the promotion. He also did not surrender at Appomattox, because he and several other artillery officers engaged federal artillery on April 8, 1865, and had escaped toward Lynchburg. However, Cabell returned to Richmond, took the oath of allegiance on July 26, 1865, and received a presidential pardon from Andrew Jackson on August 1, 1865.

Following the conflict, Cabell was financially embarrassed. However, he resumed his law partnership with his brother-in-law William Daniel, formerly a judge of the Virginia Supreme Court. On January 11, 1884, his wife died after her clothing caught fire in this home, so Cabell moved to rooms at the Saint Claire Hotel in Richmond, where he died and was buried at a historic Hollywood cemetery.

== Architecture ==
It was built in 1847, and was originally built as a two-story, L-shaped Greek Revival style brick dwelling, subsequently added throughout the 19th century. It consists of a large central section with two-story portico, flanked by two smaller wings. The house features a portico supported by four columns with "Egyptian" lotus flower capitals. It was the home of Henry Coalter Cabell, son of Governor William H. Cabell, and a Confederate veteran and leading member of the Richmond Bar. It was listed on the National Register of Historic Places in 1972.
