= John J. Owen =

American politician (1859–1933)

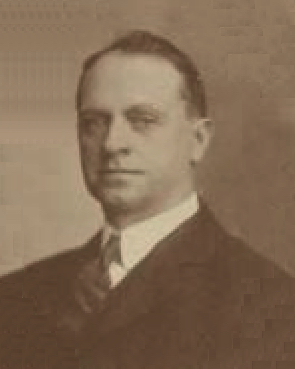

Member of the Virginia Senate from the 28th district
- In office January 12, 1910 – January 10, 1912
- Preceded by: William Hodges Mann
- Succeeded by: Robert K. Brock

Member of the Virginia House of Delegates from Prince Edward County
- In office December 6, 1899 – January 12, 1910
- Preceded by: Asa D. Watkins
- Succeeded by: William H. Ewing

Personal details
- Born: August 27, 1859 Prince Edward, Virginia, U.S.
- Died: January 25, 1933 (aged 73) Prince Edward, Virginia, U.S.
- Party: Democratic
- Spouse: Frances Ellen Daniel
- Education: Virginia Tech

John J. Owen (August 27, 1859 – January 25, 1933) was an American Democratic politician who served as a member of the Virginia Senate, representing the state's 28th district.

Virginia House of Delegates
Preceded by Asa D. Watkins	Virginia Delegate from Prince Edward County; 1899–1910	Succeeded by William H. Ewing
Senate of Virginia
Preceded by William Hodges Mann	Virginia Senator for the 28th District; 1910–1912	Succeeded by Robert K. Brock
