= William D. Medley =

American politician

Member of the Virginia Senate from the 22nd district
- In office January 12, 1944 – January 14, 1948
- Preceded by: New - Redistricting
- Succeeded by: Charles R. Fenwick

Member of the Virginia Senate from the 29th district
- In office January 10, 1940 – January 12, 1944
- Preceded by: John Warwick Rust
- Succeeded by: Andrew W. Clarke (Redistricting)

Member of the Virginia House of Delegates from Arlington County
- In office January 10, 1934 – January 10, 1940
- Preceded by: Hugh Reid
- Succeeded by: Charles R. Fenwick

Personal details
- Born: William Dunbar Medley; February 8, 1898 Piney Point, Maryland, U.S.
- Died: March 28, 1967 (aged 69) Arlington, Virginia, U.S.
- Party: Democratic
- Spouse: Ruth Lucy Kane
- Education: National University School of Law

William Dunbar Medley (February 8, 1898 – March 28, 1967) was an American Democratic politician who served as a member of the Virginia Senate and House of Delegates.

Virginia House of Delegates
Preceded by Hugh Reid	Virginia Delegate for Arlington; 1934–1940	Succeeded by Charles R. Fenwick
Senate of Virginia
Preceded by John Warwick Rust	Virginia Senator for the 29th District; 1940–1948	Succeeded by Charles R. Fenwick
