= Francis N. Watkins =

American politician and judge (1813–1885)

Member of the Virginia House of Delegates from the Prince Edward County district
- In office 1865–1869
- Preceded by: Thomas H. Flood
- Succeeded by: James W. D. Bland

Personal details
- Born: Francis Nathaniel Watkins; April 1813 Prince Edward County, Virginia, U.S.
- Died: September 5, 1885 (aged 72) Lynchburg, Virginia, U.S.
- Spouse: Martha Ann Scott (m. 1838)
- Children: 12, including Asa
- Parent: Henry E. Watkins (father)
- Education: Hampden–Sidney College; University of Virginia
- Alma mater: Amherst College (BA)
- Occupation: Politician; judge; bank president

Francis Nathaniel Watkins (April 1813 – September 5, 1885) was an American politician, judge and banker from Virginia. He served as a member of the Virginia House of Delegates.

== Early life ==
Francis Nathaniel Watkins was born on April 14 (or 24), 1813, in Prince Edward County, Virginia, to Agnes W. (née Venable) and Henry E. Watkins. His father was a member of the Virginia Senate and was a captain in the War of 1812. He was educated by Reverend P. Calhoun and attended private schools in Virginia. He attended Hampden–Sidney College from 1829 to 1830 and graduated from Amherst College with a Bachelor of Arts in 1832. He studied law with J. Read of Virginia and attended the University of Virginia from 1832 to 1835. He was admitted to the bar in 1835.

== Career ==
Watkins practiced law in Prince Edward and adjacent counties from 1835 to 1849. He had a partnership with Stephen Southall. He was an officer in Farmer's Bank of Virginia from 1849 to 1864. He continued practicing law from 1864 to 1870. He served as a member of the Virginia House of Delegates, representing Prince Edward County, from 1865 to 1869. In 1870, he began serving as a county judge in Prince Edward County. He served for 14 years. In 1872, he became president of the Commercial Bank in Farmville.

Watkins was a treasurer and secretary of Union Theological Seminary for 40 years. He was member of the board of trustees of Hampden–Sidney College for 14 years. He was also affiliated with the State Normal School.

== Personal life ==
Watkins married Martha Ann Scott, daughter of John Watts Scott, of Tallahatchie County, Mississippi, on August 29, 1838. They had 12 children, including Asa D., Henry E., Charles Turner, Agnes V., Kate C. and Margaret "Maggie" Leigh. He lived in Farmville. His son Asa served in the Virginia Senate. Watkins became a ruling elder at Farmville Presbyterian Church in 1844.

Watkins died on September 5, 1885, in Lynchburg.
