= Joseph Carrington Cabell =

American politician

The Honorable Joseph Carrington Cabell
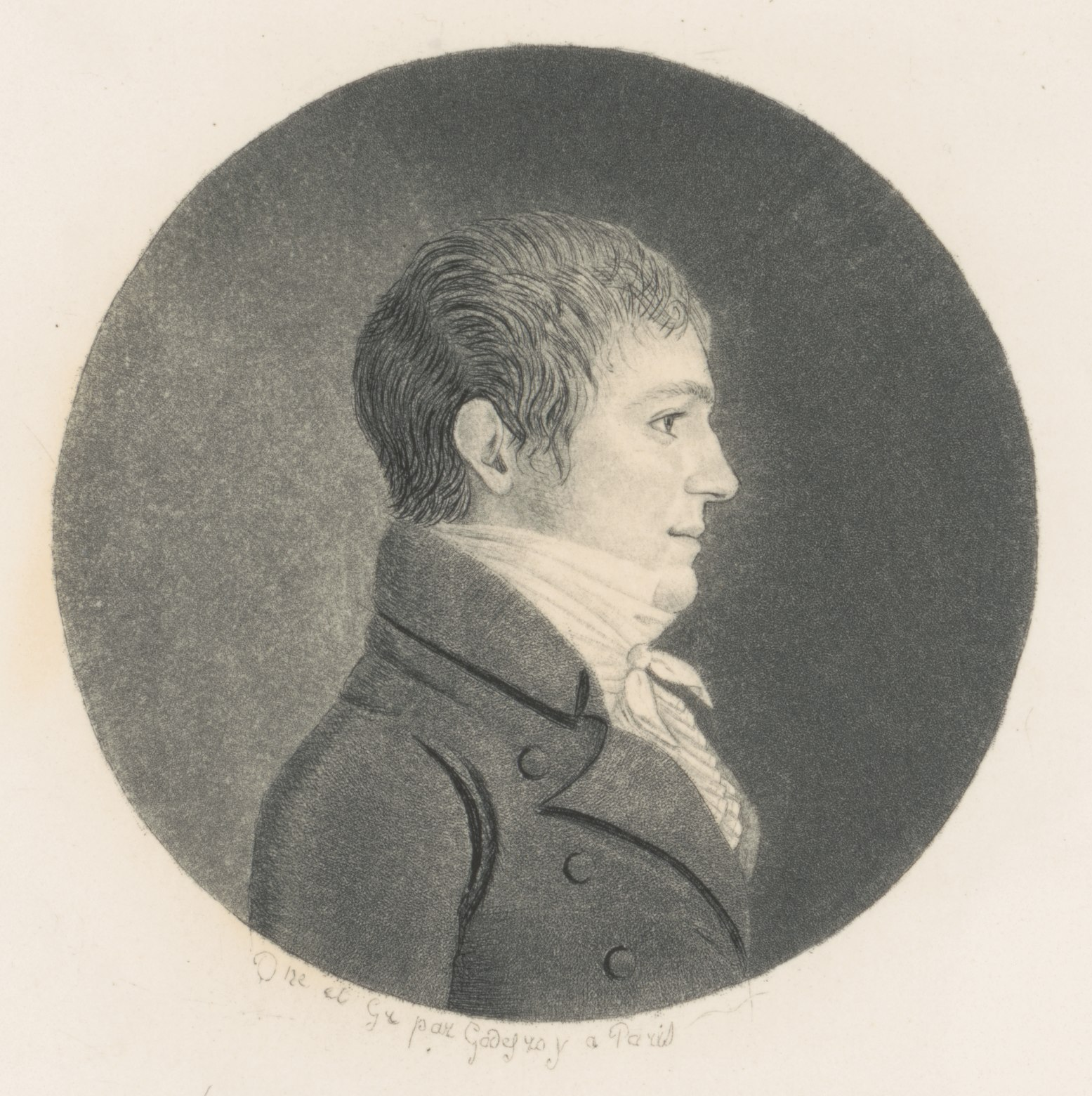

Member of the Virginia House of Delegates from the Nelson County district 1808–1810
- In office 1831–1835

Member of the Virginia Senate
- In office 1810–1829

Personal details
- Born: December 28, 1778 Amherst County, Virginia
- Died: February 5, 1856 (aged 77) Nelson County, Virginia
- Spouse: Mary Walker Carter (m. 1807)

Joseph Carrington Cabell (1778–1856) was an American politician. He was member of the Virginia House of Delegates from 1808 to 1810 and 1831 to 1835 and the Senate of Virginia from 1810 to 1829. He came from a well-connected Virginia family, and his older brother William H. Cabell served as governor of the state. Cabell, along with Thomas Jefferson, helped secure funding for the University of Virginia. He subsequently served on the University's Board of Visitors, and the current Old Cabell Hall (built in 1898) is named in his honor.
