= Edgar Allan =

English-American politician (1842–1904)

Member of the Virginia Senate from the Amelia, Cumberland, and Prince Edward Counties district
- In office January 1, 1874 – December 4, 1877
- Preceded by: John Robinson
- Succeeded by: C.H. Bliss

Personal details
- Born: February 26, 1842 Birmingham, England, United Kingdom
- Died: October 28, 1904 (aged 62) Richmond, Virginia, U.S.
- Resting place: Glenwood Cemetery
- Party: Republican
- Spouse: Mary Edna Land
- Occupation: Lawyer, printer, farmer, soldier

Military service
- Allegiance: United States
- Branch/service: Union Army
- Years of service: 1863-1865
- Rank: private
- Unit: 7th Michigan Cavalry
- Battles/wars: American Civil War: Battle of Shepherdstown

Edgar Allan (February 26, 1842 – October 28, 1904), emigrated from England to become a U.S. soldier during the American Civil War, then settled in Virginia, where he became a lawyer, a farmer and a leading Republican politician. He served in the Virginia Constitutional Convention of 1868 as well as one term in the Virginia Senate. Allan also served as the Commonwealth's attorney for Prince Edward County, held various offices in the Grand Army of the Republic and briefly served as U.S. Attorney for the Eastern District of Virginia.

== Early and family life ==
Born in Birmingham, England, to John Allan and his wife Ann Allan, Edgar Allan was literate and became a typesetter. However, he decided to emigrate to the United States.

On February 6, 1867, he married Kentucky native Mary Edna Land, with whom he had three daughters and a son.

== Military ==
Allan emigrated to the United States in 1863 and some months later volunteered to enlist in the 7th Michigan Cavalry, led by George Armstrong Custer. Wounded at the Battle of Shepherdstown in late 1864, Allan returned to service before being discharged at the war's end, but would suffer the effects the rest of his life.

== Career ==
After the war, Allan moved to Prince Edward County, and bought a farm. He read law and was admitted to the Virginia bar, then moved to the Prince Edward County seat, Farmville. In 1867, Prince Edward County voters elected him and African-American Republican James W. D. Bland to represent them at Virginia Constitutional Convention of 1868, which was necessary because Virginia's 1850 Constitution expressly permitted slavery, and the U.S. Congress would not readmit Virginia to the Union (nor seat any of its representatives) until that was corrected. During the Civil War, some Virginians had held a constitutional convention, but that document was never ratified by voters, and most Virginians did not think it valid because so few counties were represented at that constitutional convention. Despite his relatively young age and inexperience, Allan contributed often in the 1868 convention's debates, including his misgivings about certain aspects of the constitution finally drafted because he was concerned that re-enfranchised Confederates would attempt to limit rights of African Americans. Allan nonetheless supported its adoption in 1869, and Gilbert Carlton Walker for governor.

Despite being called a "carpetbagger" and "Yankee Allan", Allan himself won election (and re-election) as the commonwealth's attorney (prosecutor) for Prince Edward County, a position he held from 1871 to 1883. He also served as clerk for Farmville's town council until 1883. Meanwhile, his co-delegate, Bland, had been elected to the Virginia Senate in 1869 to represent Prince Edward and neighboring Charlotte counties, but died on April 27, 1870, during the disastrous collapse at the Virginia state capitol due to overcrowding in anticipation of the Virginia Supreme Court's decision concerning Richmond's contested mayoral election.

After the redistricting following the 1870 census (conducted by the 1870/71 legislature), Prince Edward County was combined with Amelia and Cumberland Counties as a senatorial district (rather than with Charlotte County). In 1874 voters elected Allan to replace John Robinson in representing this district in the Virginia Senate. C. W. Bliss was elected to replace Allan in 1877.

In 1883, Allan moved his legal practice to Richmond, where it thrived, and he eventually admitted his son Edgar Allan Jr., so that the law firm became known as "Allan & Allan". He gained considerable acclaim in the African-American community there, especially in 1892 for his representation of Bettie Lewis, the acknowledged mulatto daughter of a rich white industrialist who on his deathbed said he wanted her to inherit his estate, but who died without a will and the administrators refused to follow the oral instructions.

Allan was active in Virginia's Republican Party (and later the Readjuster Party), as well as Grand Army of the Republic (GAR). He attended most Republican state conventions, as well as made many speaking tours during campaign season, and sat on the city, county, and district Republican executive committees. Allan became commander of the GAR's Philip Kearny Post in Richmond (1885–1886), junior vice-commander of the national GAR (1886), and was commander-in-chief of the GAR Constitutional Centennial in 1887. Thus, in his final years, he was referred to as "General Allan" rather than "Yankee Allan."

In 1900, Allan challenged former Confederate John Lamb to represent Virginia's 3rd congressional district (then compact and centered on Richmond, although now meandering through several counties to the south), but did not succeed. President William McKinley, a fellow Republican, appointed Allan as U.S. Attorney for the Eastern District of Virginia, but after McKinley's assassination, President Theodore Roosevelt refused to renew the appointment. Instead, Roosevelt supported former Confederate and Readjuster Campbell Slemp of southwest Virginia, who after 1903 controlled Republican patronage in the Commonwealth, and who for many years would be the only Republican in the state's Congressional delegation, in part because the Virginia Constitution adopted in 1902 severely restricted voting rights of African Americans and poor whites.

== Death and legacy ==
Distraught at his loss of political power to Slemp's faction of the Virginia Republican party (aligned with President Theodore Roosevelt), as well as continuing to suffer from his Civil War wound, and the onset of Bright's disease, Allan bought a pistol and cartridge, wrote a note and committed suicide in Richmond, Virginia on October 28, 1904. He was buried in Glenwood Cemetery in Washington, D.C.
