= John Robinson (Virginia politician, born 1822) =

American politician

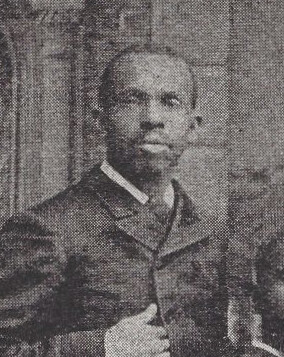

Member of the Virginia Senate from the Cumberland and adjoining counties district
- In office October 5, 1869 – December 31, 1873
- Preceded by: Christopher C. McRae
- Succeeded by: Edgar Allan

Personal details
- Born: 1822, or October 28, 1825 or 1826 Cumberland County, Virginia, U.S.
- Died: January 1908
- Party: Republican
- Profession: Innkeeper, politician

John Robinson (1822, or October 28, 1825, or 1826 – January 1908) an innkeeper and politician who represented Cumberland County, Virginia in the Virginia Constitutional Convention of 1868 and later served in the Virginia Senate representing Cumberland and adjoining counties (the district boundaries changing between elections).

== Early life ==
Robinson was born free in Cumberland County, Virginia, either in 1822 or October 28, 1825, or 1826. His mother was Catharine “Kitty” Lipscomb. His formal education was limited.

== Career ==
The Virginia Capitol at Richmond VA where 19th century Conventions met

As an adult, around 1857 Robinson purchased his first property of twenty-four acre.

In 1867, Cumberland County voters elected Robinson to the Virginia Constitutional Convention of 1868. A Republican, he was the sole delegate elected from Cumberland County.

Voters from Cumberland and adjoining counties twice elected Robinson to the Senate of Virginia. He was elected in 1869 to a district that also included Amelia and Nottoway Counties. Following the census of 1870, the district's boundaries were again altered, removing Nottoway County and substituting Prince Edward County instead. Thus Robinson served during the sessions 1869/70, 1870/71, 1871/72 and 1872/73. His successor, Edgar Allan was a white lawyer, also Republican, and who had emigrated from England.

In 1877 Robinson purchased the Effingham House tavern.

== Death ==
John Robinson died in January 1908.

== See also ==
- African American officeholders from the end of the Civil War until before 1900

== Bibliography ==
- Jackson, Luther Porter (1945). Negro Office-Holders in Virginia, 1865-1895. Guide Quality Press, Norfolk, Virginia. ISBN 9780598580269.
- Pulliam, David Loyd (1901). The Constitutional Conventions of Virginia from the foundation of the Commonwealth to the present time. John T. West, Richmond. ISBN 978-1-2879-2059-5.
- Swem, Earl Greg (1918). A Register of the General Assembly of Virginia, 1776-1918, and of the Constitutional Conventions. David Bottom, Superintendent of Public Printing. ISBN 978-1-3714-6242-0.
