= Tammy Brankley Mulchi =

American politician from Virginia

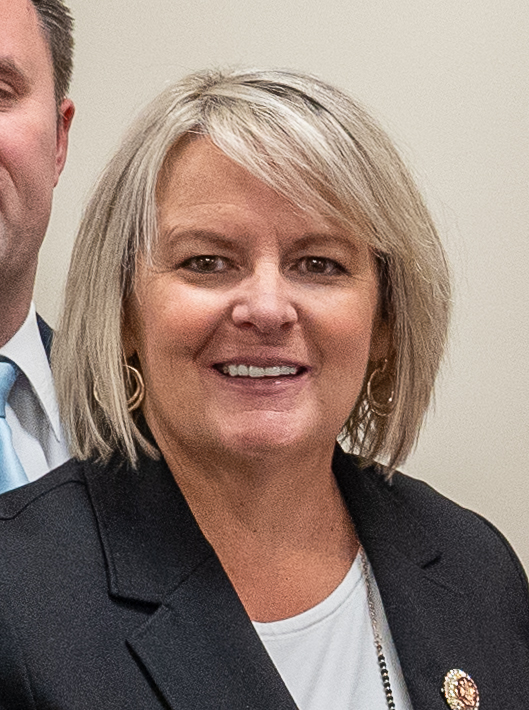

Member of the Virginia Senate from the 9th district
- Incumbent
- Assumed office January 17, 2024
- Preceded by: Frank Ruff (redistricting)

Personal details
- Party: Republican

Tammy Brankley Mulchi is an American Republican politician from Virginia. She was elected to the Virginia Senate from the 9th district in a special election in January 2024 following the 2023 Virginia Senate election.
