= Virginia's 9th Senate district =

American legislative district

Virginia's 9th State Senate district
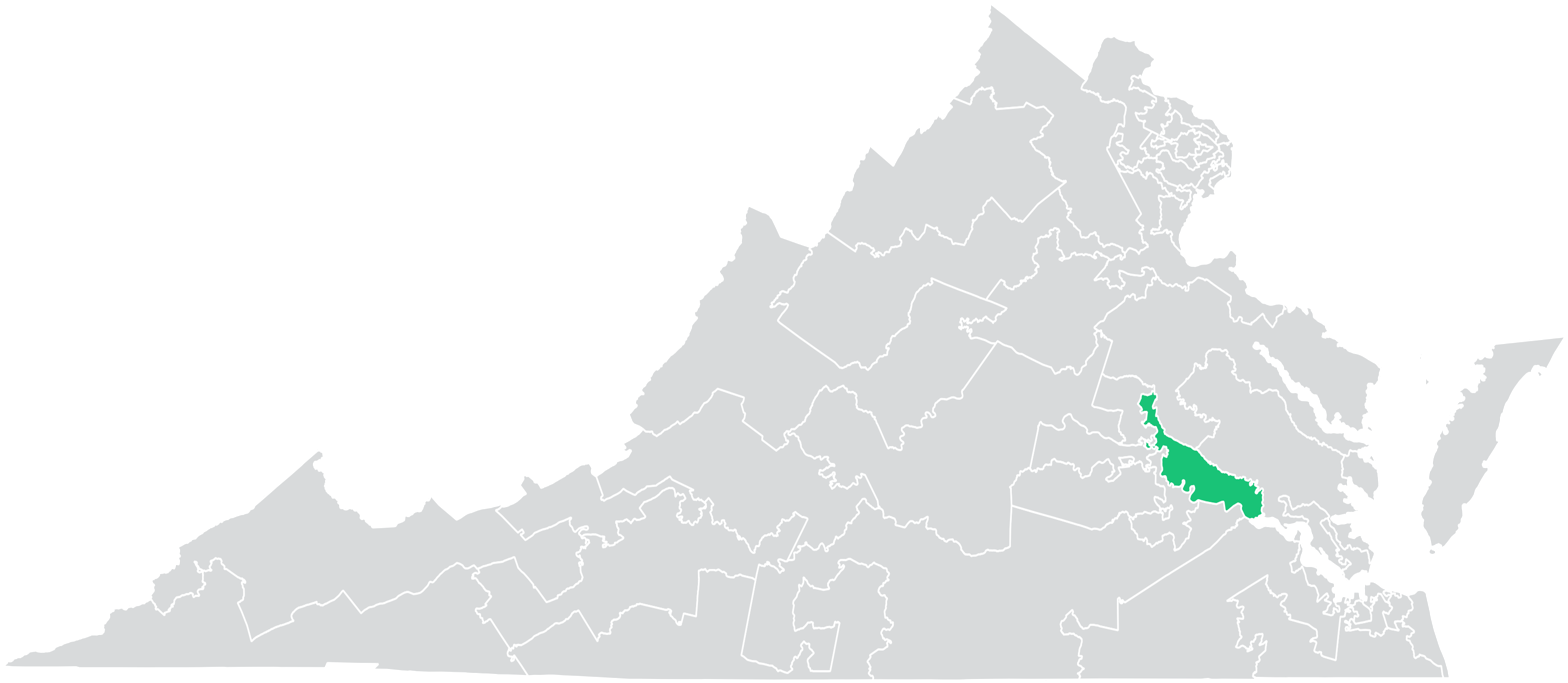
Senator
Tammy Brankley Mulchi; R–Clarksville
- Demographics: 39% White; 52% Black; 3% Hispanic; 2% Asian; 3% Other
- Population (2019): 208,848
- Registered voters: 153,441

Virginia's 9th Senate district is one of 40 districts in the Senate of Virginia. It has been represented by Republican Tammy Brankley Mulchi since 2024.

== Geography ==
District 9 is located in south-central Virginia, including the counties of Charlotte, Halifax, Lunenburg, Mecklenburg, Nottoway, Pittsylvania, and a portion of Prince Edward. The independent city that is part of District 9 is Danville.

The district is located entirely within Virginia's 5th congressional district, and overlaps with the 48th, 49th, 50th, 51st, 56th, and 72nd districts of the Virginia House of Delegates.

== Recent election results ==
=== 2024 special election ===
Republican Tammy Brankley Mulchi was elected in January 2024.

=== 2023 special election ===
Following Jennifer McClellan's election to Congress, a special election was called for the district. Lamont Bagby, the Democratic nominee, won the election with 89.84% of the vote.

County and independent city results Bagby: 70–80%; 80–90%; >90%

2023 Virginia Senate special election, District 9
Party	Candidate	Votes	%
Democratic	Lamont Bagby	13,552	89.84
Republican	Stephen J. Imholt	1,495	9.91
Write-In	Write In	37	0.25
Total votes		15,084	100
Democratic hold			

=== 2019 ===
County and independent city results McClellan: 50–60%; 60–70%; 70–80%; 80–90%

2019 Virginia Senate election, District 9
Party	Candidate	Votes	%
Democratic	Jennifer McClellan (incumbent)	49,451	80.1
Libertarian	Mark Lewis	11,707	19.0
Total votes		61,771	100
Democratic hold			

=== 2017 special ===
2017 Virginia Senate special election, District 9
Party	Candidate	Votes	%
Democratic	Jennifer McClellan	7,849	91.3
Libertarian	Corey Falconer	692	8.1
Total votes		8,596	100
Democratic hold			

=== 2015 ===
2015 Virginia Senate election, District 9
Party	Candidate	Votes	%
Democratic	Donald McEachin (incumbent)	31,067	95.0
Total votes		32,687	100
Democratic hold			

=== 2011 ===
2011 Virginia Senate election, District 9
Party	Candidate	Votes	%
Democratic	Donald McEachin (incumbent)	28,802	90.6
Total votes		31,778	100
Democratic hold			

=== Federal and statewide results ===
Year	Office	Results
2020	President	Biden 75.1–23.1%
2017	Governor	Northam 75.1–23.9%
2016	President	Clinton 72.2–23.5%
2014	Senate	Warner 71.7–25.9%
2013	Governor	McAuliffe 69.2–23.6%
2012	President	Obama 72.8–26.1%
2012	Senate	Kaine 74.2–24.8%

== Historical results ==
All election results below took place prior to 2011 redistricting, and thus were under different district lines.

=== 2007 ===
2007 Virginia Senate election, District 9
Primary election
Party	Candidate	Votes	%
Democratic	Donald McEachin	6,253	58.1
Democratic	Benjamin Lambert (incumbent)	4,512	41.9
Total votes		10,765	100
General election
Democratic	Donald McEachin	16,782	80.9
Independent	Silver Persinger	3,789	18.3
Total votes		20,740	100
Democratic hold			

=== 2003 ===
2003 Virginia Senate election, District 9
Party	Candidate	Votes	%
Democratic	Benjamin Lambert (incumbent)	18,747	98.9
Total votes		18,948	100
Democratic hold			

=== 1999 ===
1999 Virginia Senate election, District 9
Party	Candidate	Votes	%
Democratic	Benjamin Lambert (incumbent)	9,571	99.3
Total votes		9,643	100
Democratic hold			

=== 1995 ===
1995 Virginia Senate election, District 9
Party	Candidate	Votes	%
Democratic	Benjamin Lambert (incumbent)	21,174	99.9
Total votes		21,199	100
Democratic hold			

== District officeholders since 1940 ==
Years	Senator, District 9	Counties/Cities in District
1940–1944	Robert K. Brock (D)	Amelia County, Amherst County, Appomattox County, Buckingham County, Cumberland County, Nelson County, and Powhatan County
1944–1948	Robert K. Brock (D)	Amelia County, Amherst County, Appomattox County, Buckingham County, Cumberland County, Nelson County, and Powhatan County
1948	W. Dennis Kendig (D)	Amelia County, Amherst County, Appomattox County, Buckingham County, Cumberland County, Nelson County, and Powhatan County
1949–1952	George W. Palmer	Amelia County, Amherst County, Appomattox County, Buckingham County, Cumberland County, Nelson County, and Powhatan County
1952–1956	George W. Palmer	Amelia County, Amherst County, Appomattox County, Buckingham County, Cumberland County, Nelson County, and Powhatan County
1956–1960	Charles R. Fenwick (D)	Arlington County
1960–1964	Charles R. Fenwick (D)	Arlington County
1964–1968	Charles R. Fenwick (D)	Arlington County (part)
1968–1972	M. Patton Echols (R)	Arlington County (part)
1972–1976	Douglas Wilder (D)	City of Richmond (part)
1976–1980	Douglas Wilder (D)	City of Richmond (part)
1980–1984	Douglas Wilder (D)	City of Richmond (part)
1984–1986	Douglas Wilder (D)	City of Richmond (part)
1986–1988	Benjamin Lambert (D)	City of Richmond (part) and Henrico County (part)
1988–1992	Benjamin Lambert (D)	City of Richmond (part) and Henrico County (part)
1992–1996	Benjamin Lambert (D)	Charles City County, City of Richmond (part), and Henrico County (part)
1996–2000	Benjamin Lambert (D)	Charles City County, City of Richmond (part), and Henrico County (part)
2000–2004	Benjamin Lambert (D)	Charles City County, City of Richmond (part), and Henrico County (part)
2004–2008	Benjamin Lambert (D)	Charles City County, City of Richmond (part), and Henrico County (part)
2008–2012	Donald McEachin (D)	Charles City County, City of Richmond (part), and Henrico County (part)
2012–2016	Donald McEachin (D)	Charles City County, Hanover County (part), Henrico County (part), and City of Richmond (part)
2016–2017	Donald McEachin (D)	Charles City County, Hanover County (part), Henrico County (part), and City of Richmond (part)
2017–2020	Jennifer McClellan (D)	Charles City County, Hanover County (part), Henrico County (part), and City of Richmond (part)
2020–2023	Jennifer McClellan (D)	Charles City County, Hanover County (part), Henrico County (part), and City of Richmond (part)
2023–2024	Lamont Bagby (D)	Charles City County, Hanover County (part), Henrico County (part), and City of Richmond (part)
