= Thomas H. Flood =

American politician

Member of the Virginia House of Delegates
- In office December 2, 1861 – December 4, 1865
- Preceded by: Crawford H. Jones
- Succeeded by: Francis N. Watkins
- Constituency: Appomattox County
- In office December 2, 1844 – December 7, 1846 Serving with: William M. Moseley (1844–1845); Willis P. Bocock (1845–1846)
- Preceded by: Thomas S. Bocock
- Succeeded by: Samuel D. McDearmon
- Constituency: Buckingham County
- In office January 7, 1839 – December 6, 1841 Serving with George W. Kyle
- Preceded by: Charles Yancey
- Succeeded by: John W. Haskins
- Constituency: Buckingham County

Member of the Virginia Senate for Campbell and Appomattox
- In office December 3, 1855 – December 5, 1859
- Preceded by: Crawford H. Jones
- Succeeded by: Francis N. Watkins

Personal details
- Born: 1804 Buckingham County, Virginia, U.S.
- Died: 1873 (aged 68–69) Appomattox County, Virginia, U.S.
- Education: Washington College
- Occupation: Lawyer; politician

Thomas H. Flood (1804 – 1873) was a nineteenth-century American politician from Virginia.

== Early life ==
Flood was born in Buckingham County, Virginia in 1806, before it split to form Appomattox County. He was educated at Washington College in Lexington, Virginia.

== Career ==
The Virginia Capitol at Richmond VA where 19th century Conventions met

As an adult, Flood established a plantation in what would become Appomattox County, and served in the General Assembly until 1845 when Appomattox County split from Buckingham County.

In 1850, Flood was elected to the Virginia Constitutional Convention of 1850. He was one of three delegates elected from the Southside delegate district made up of his home district of Appomattox County, as well as Charlotte and Prince Edward Counties.

Flood was elected to the Senate of Virginia from the district of Campbell County, Appomattox County and the city of Lynchburg for the 1852-1853 term.

During the American Civil War, Flood was again elected as a Delegate to the General Assembly from Appomattox County in 1861 to 1862 under the Confederate regime.

== Death ==
Thomas H. Flood died in Appomattox County, Virginia in 1873.

== Bibliography ==
- Pulliam, David Loyd (1901). The Constitutional Conventions of Virginia from the foundation of the Commonwealth to the present time. John T. West, Richmond. ISBN 978-1-2879-2059-5.
