= George W. Palmer (Virginia politician) =

American politician

Member of the Virginia Senate from the 9th district
- In office January 11, 1950 – January 11, 1956
- Preceded by: W. Dennis Kendig
- Succeeded by: Charles R. Fenwick

Personal details
- Born: George Washington Palmer; February 22, 1894 Brunswick, Virginia, U.S.
- Died: April 27, 1972 (aged 78) Sarasota, Florida, U.S.
- Party: Democratic
- Spouse: Ruth Iva Love
- Occupation: Dairy Farmer

George Washington Palmer (February 22, 1894 – April 27, 1972) was a Democratic state senator from Prince Edward County, Virginia and was a school board member during the period of his county's massive resistance opposition to racial integration of the public schools.

== Political career ==
Palmer was first elected to the Virginia Senate in a special election in 1948 representing the 9th district, upon the death of Senator W. Dennis Kendig. He was later reelected to a full term from 1952 – 1956.

By 1959, Palmer was on the Prince Edward County School Board when it was faced with an order to desegregate its public schools. The Prince Edward County school board closed the entire school system in September 1959 rather than integrate. Prince Edward County was the only school district in the country to resort to such extreme measures. In 1963, Palmer was the Chair of the School Board who reopened the public schools under federal court order.

Senate of Virginia
Preceded by W. Dennis Kendig	Virginia Senate, District 9; 1948–1956	Succeeded by Charles R. Fenwick
