= Charles R. Fenwick =

American politician and patent attorney (1900–1969)

Member of the Virginia Senate from the 9th district
- In office 1956–1969
- Preceded by: George W. Palmer
- Succeeded by: M. Patton Echols

Member of the Virginia Senate from the 22nd district
- In office 1948–1956
- Preceded by: William D. Medley
- Succeeded by: Curry Carter

Member of the Virginia House of Delegates from the Arlington district
- In office 1940–1946
- Preceded by: William D. Medley
- Succeeded by: George Damm

Personal details
- Born: Charles Rogers Fenwick; August 11, 1900 Fairfax, Virginia, U.S.
- Died: February 22, 1969 (aged 68) Arlington, Virginia, U.S.
- Resting place: Falls Church, Virginia
- Party: Democratic
- Spouse: Eleanor Russell Eastman
- Education: University of Virginia
- Profession: Attorney

Charles Rogers Fenwick (August 11, 1900 – February 22, 1969) was a patent attorney and Virginia Democratic politician aligned with the Byrd Organization who served part-time in the Virginia House of Delegates and Senate representing Arlington County.

== Early life and education ==
Fenwick was born on August 11, 1900, in Falls Church, Virginia, to banker Edward Taylor Fenwick (who in 1937 became president of the Arlington and Fairfax Building & Loan Association) and his wife the former Clara Gulagher. He graduated at the top of his class from Western High School in Washington DC (where he also captained the football team). He then volunteered and joined the tank corps of the University of Virginia's Student Army Training Corps during World War I, but the war ended before private Fenwick was transferred overseas. Fenwick then began attending the University of Virginia, studying engineering beginning in 1919. In 1922, a year after he transferred to the University of Virginia's academic school, Fenwick helped found the formed Beta chapter of Sigma Nu fraternity. Fenwick played varsity football as a tackle (and was named to several regional all-star teams) as well as boxed as a heavyweight for three of his undergraduate years (losing only one bout and winning a spot as alternate on the U.S. Olympic team). In 1924, Fenwick graduated from the University of Virginia, and later attended post-graduate studies at George Washington University before receiving his LL.B. from the University of Virginia in 1925. He much later became president of the alumni association and in 1962 became the first recipient of the Virginia Hall of Fame Award for distinguished achievements after leaving college. He also became a charter member of the Touchdown Club of Washington, D.C., and served as its third president

In 1929, Fenwick married Eleanor Russell Eastman, a Presbyterian, though he did not change his Baptist affiliation. They had no children, but in 1946 moved into what had been her father's house in Arlington, Everbloom, which was later declared historically significant. Fenwick also owned a farm in Cumberland County, Virginia.

== Legal career ==
Admitted to the Virginia bar in 1924, Fenwick was a patent attorney and practiced at a law firm his grandfather founded in 1861, Mason, Fenwick & Lawrence. He also coached the football line at U.Va. and later in the 1920s at the University of Maryland. Beginning in 1934 until his death, Fenwick served as a member of the Virginia State Wrestling and Boxing Commission (now the Boxing, Martial Arts and Professional Wrestling Advisory Board). He was also president of the local Rotary Club.

== Political career ==
Fenwick began leading the Arlington (and Falls Church) chapter of the Young Democrats in 1931 during the Great Depression, eventually chairing the County Democratic Committee and serving on the Democratic State Committee, which by then was unofficially led by U.S. Senator Harry F. Byrd.

Fenwick was elected to the Virginia House of Delegates representing Arlington County in 1939 and served in the House from 1940 to 1946. During that World War II period, the legislative position being part-time, Fenwick also served as chief of the Royalty Adjustment Branch at an Army Air Forces base in Ohio, rising to the rank of lieutenant colonel. He also sat on the Virginia Advisory Legislative Council. In 1944 Fenwick ran for lieutenant governor in the Democratic primary, which became an embarrassment to the Byrd Organization's "clean government" image – because the vote totals for Fenwick in Wise County (winning 3,307 to 122) and for L. Preston Collins in Appomattox County (winning 1610 to 25) seemed improbable (Byrd had endorsed neither, and the third candidate Leonard Muse of Roanoke often criticized the Byrd Organization). When a Richmond judge threw out the Wise County returns, Fenwick did not pursue an inquiry into the Appomattox returns, but accepted defeat.

In 1947, Fenwick ran for, and was elected to, the Virginia Senate representing the 22nd Senate District after the retirement of Sen. William D. Medley. He was a delegate to 1952 Democratic National Convention from Virginia. Fenwick also served as a member of the Virginia Democratic State Central Committee from 1952 – 1964. He failed to win the Democratic primary for governor in 1953. In 1956, the Virginia Senate was redistricted and Fenwick was elected from the 9th District (which still consisted of all of Arlington County) and was re-elected until his death in 1969.

Especially after the United States Supreme Court decisions in Brown v. Board of Education in 1954 and 1955, Arlington became embroiled in Massive Resistance. Its elected school board wanted to desegregate, but Senator Byrd declared his opposition to desegregated schools anywhere in Virginia. Segregationists within the Byrd Organization, especially in Southside Virginia, wanted to close any school which desegregated, even pursuant to an order of a federal court, as Arlington also faced. Arlington's local elected school board was replaced with an appointed one, and even that proved insufficiently segregationist for some.

As part of the Byrd Organization, Fenwick was assigned to serve on both legislative commissions designed to circumvent desegregation: the 1956 Gray Commission and later the 1959 Perrow Commission (after both the Virginia Supreme Court and a three-judge federal panel declared Virginia's public school segregation in the Stanley Plan unconstitutional on January 19, 1959). The Byrd Organization had become radicalized after the Gray Commission issued a report authorizing local options in public schools. Fenwick drafted several laws in the subsequent Stanley Plan, specifically those aimed at harassing the NAACP (which was handling the legal challenges to Arlington's (and other) public schools). When Fenwick and segregationist attorney David J. Mays debated two desegregationists at a local high school in November 1959, audience members booed Fenwick (who was nonetheless later re-elected). Those anti-NAACP laws were later declared unconstitutional, one by the Virginia Supreme Court and the remainder by the United States Supreme Court in the 1963 decision NAACP v. Button (the brief for which Mays helped write but which his associate argued on the state's losing behalf). In 1963, Fenwick also broke with the Byrd Organization by running for governor a second time without Senator Byrd's blessing. He was defeated, but continued influential in the state Senate, including as a member of the Steering Committee (making assignments to other committees), Finance Committee and Roads Committee. He had yielded chairmanship of the Senate Welfare Committee to Sen. Riven. He also served on and chaired the Virginia Advisory Legislative Council.

He served as Rector of the Board of Visitors for the University of Virginia from 1964 to 1966, and helped establish a branch in Fairfax County that became George Mason University. He sat on that board of directors from 1966 to 1968.

Fenwick helped negotiate the interstate compact that created the Washington Metropolitan Transportation Commission in 1960, and continued to work for cooperation among the region's local governments, forming the Washington Metropolitan Regional Conference (which later became the Metropolitan Washington Council of Governments) in 1961. He also chaired the Virginia Airports Authority from its creation in 1958. Another agency was created to build a subway system, which became the Washington Metropolitan Area Transit Authority in 1966. In 1968 Fenwick joined the Dulles International Airport Development Commission.

In 1964, Fenwick was elected a Presidential Elector for Virginia and cast his ballot for Lyndon B. Johnson. Throughout his life, Fenwick was a member of the American Bar Association, the Freemasons, the Shriners, the Elks Club, the Moose Lodge, the American Legion, the Rotary Club and the Farm Bureau.

== Death and memorials ==
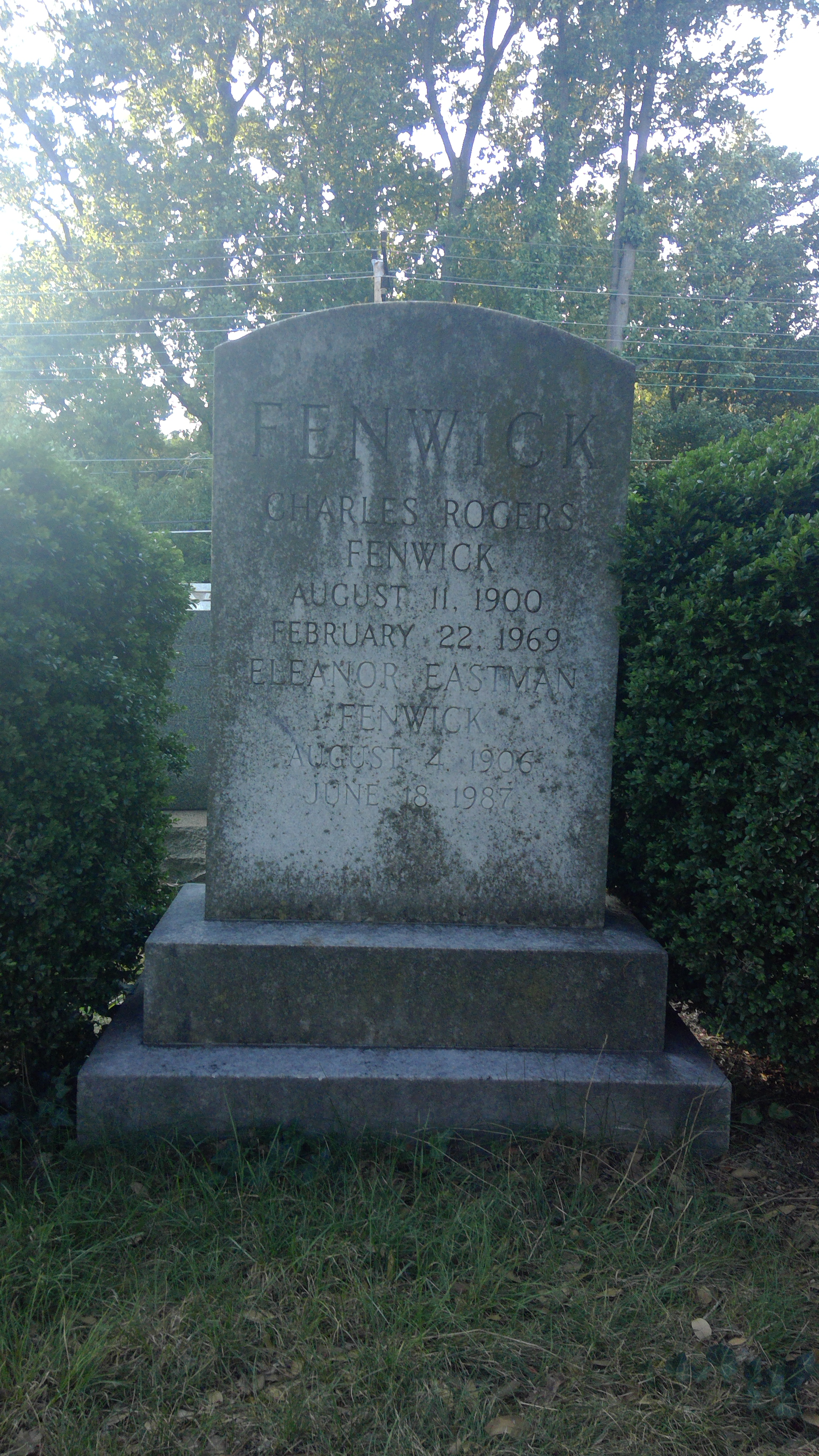
Grave of Charles and Eleanor Fenwick

On February 22, 1969, Fenwick died of complications about a month after major surgery for diverticulitis at a local hospital and was buried at Oakwood Cemetery in Falls Church, Virginia. Governor Mills Godwin and former U.S. Representative Howard W. Smith were among the many distinguished attendees at the funeral, in addition to his wife, sisters Mrs. John Demarest, Mrs. Boynton P. Livingston, Mrs. J.R. Browning and Mrs. Donald K. Addie, as well as family friends Mrs. William Tate and Mrs. Charles H. Smith of Richmond and over 800 additional mourners.

The Fenwick Library at George Mason University is named after Fenwick, due to his role as an advocate for the University when it was first being founded. A Washington Metro bridge linking Arlington and the District of Columbia is named for Senator Fenwick. In 1978, Arlington named its human resources center on Walter Reed Drive after Fenwick, although the building no longer exists.

Virginia House of Delegates
Preceded by William D. Medley	Virginia House of Delegates; Representing Arlington County; 1940–1946	Succeeded by George Damm
Senate of Virginia
Preceded by William D. Medley	Virginia Senate, District 22; 1948–1956	Succeeded by Curry Carter
Preceded by George W. Palmer	Virginia Senate, District 9; 1956–1969	Succeeded by M. Patton Echols
