= Robert K. Brock =

American politician

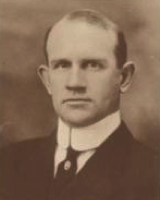

Member of the Virginia Senate from the 9th district
- In office January 8, 1936 – January 14, 1948
- Preceded by: H. Hunter Watson
- Succeeded by: W. Dennis Kendig

Member of the Virginia Senate from the 28th district
- In office January 10, 1912 – January 12, 1916
- Preceded by: John J. Owen
- Succeeded by: George E. Allen

Personal details
- Born: Robert Kincaid Brock; May 29, 1878 Buckingham County, Virginia, U.S.
- Died: November 18, 1962 (aged 84) Prince Edward, Virginia, U.S.
- Party: Democratic
- Education: Hampden–Sydney College; University of Virginia

Robert Kincaid Brock (May 29, 1878 – November 18, 1962) was an American Democratic politician who served twice as a member of the Virginia Senate, from 1912 to 1916 and again from 1936 to 1948.

Senate of Virginia
Preceded by John J. Owen	Virginia Senator for the 28th District; 1912–1916	Succeeded by George E. Allen
Preceded by H. Hunter Watson	Virginia Senator for the 9th District; 1936–1948	Succeeded by W. Dennis Kendig
