= John T. Hamlett =

19th century American politician

John T. Hamlett was an American government official, state legislator, and mining industry leader in Virginia. He was elected to the Virginia Senate after the death of James W. D. Bland on April 27, 1870 in a state capitol building collapse. He represented Charlotte County and Prince Edward County.

He was involved in the mining business.
