= James W. D. Bland =

American politician (1838-1870)

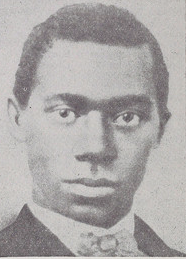

Member of the Virginia Senate from the Charlotte and Prince Edward Counties district
- In office October 5, 1869 – April 27, 1870
- Preceded by: Francis N. Watkins
- Succeeded by: John T. Hamlett

Personal details
- Born: c. 1838 Prince Edward County, Virginia, U.S.
- Died: April 27, 1870 (aged 31 or 32) Richmond, Virginia
- Party: Republican
- Occupation: Carpenter, Cooper

James W. D. Bland (c. 1838 – April 27, 1870) was a nineteenth-century African-American politician and carpenter from Virginia. After the Civil War, he was elected to the Virginia Constitutional Convention of 1868 and then to the Virginia State Senate.

== Early life ==
Bland was born free in Farmville, Virginia, in Prince Edward County, Virginia. His father Hercules Bland had bought his mother Mary and freed her so that their children would be born free.

James Bland learned to read and write in the home of the former owner of his mother, Alexander Bruce. Bland was probably apprenticed to Bruce as a carpenter before working in his father’s cooper shop making hogsheads for tobacco.

== Career ==
The Virginia Capitol at Richmond, Virginia, where 19th-century conventions met

Bland was probably apprenticed to Bruce as a carpenter before working in his father’s cooper shop making hogsheads for tobacco.

Following the American Civil War, Bland married in 1867 at the age of twenty nine.

In 1867, Bland was elected to the Virginia Constitutional Convention of 1868. A Republican, he was one of two delegates elected from the southside Piedmont convention district made up of Prince Edward County and Appomattox County, along with a white Republican. While a staunch defender of constitutionally guaranteeing the black franchise, Bland supported restoring the vote to ex-Confederates.

Following the Convention, Bland was elected to the Virginia Senate, for the session of 1869/70.

Though Bland bought no property during his lifetime, at his untimely death in 1870, his wife immediately bought three lots in Farmville for one thousand dollars.

== Death ==
James W. D. Bland was among the approximately 60 people who died on April 27, 1870, in a disastrous collapse at the state capitol, which started when a balcony overloaded with spectators awaiting the Virginia Supreme Court decision concerning Richmond's mayoral election collapsed into the court chamber, which in turn collapsed into the legislative area. The General Assembly provided for Bland's funeral expenses, sent a delegation to attend Bland’s funeral in Farmville, and presented his widow with a formal resolution of condolence. The Richmond and Petersburg press at the time lamented the passing of the most able member of the African-American race sitting in the state legislature.

At the subsequent special election in 1870, John T. Hamlett of Charlotte County, Virginia, was elected to fill the remainder of Bland's term, and later resigned, perhaps to concentrate on the Wistar Copper Mining Company, which he formed by 1875. However, the federal census of 1870 also caused redistricting, and Bland's former district was one of those redrawn by the 1870/1871 legislature. In 1873, Bland's co-delegate at the Constitutional Convention, Edgar Allan was elected to the Virginia Senate, representing Prince Edward, Amelia, and Cumberland Counties. Bland was buried at the Odd Fellows Cemetery (Farmville, Virginia).

== Bibliography ==
- Jackson, Luther Porter (1945). Negro Office-Holders in Virginia, 1865-1895. Guide Quality Press, Norfolk, Virginia. ISBN 9780598580269.
- Pulliam, David Loyd (1901). The Constitutional Conventions of Virginia from the foundation of the Commonwealth to the present time. John T. West, Richmond. ISBN 978-1-2879-2059-5.
- Swem, Earl Greg (1918). A Register of the General Assembly of Virginia, 1776-1918, and of the Constitutional Conventions. David Bottom, Superintendent of Public Printing. ISBN 978-1-3714-6242-0.
- Tartar, Brent (2013). The grandees of government: the origins and persistence of undemocratic politics in Virginia. University of Virginia Press. ISBN 978-0-8139-3431-0.
