= Peter Winston (politician) =

American politician (1836–1920)

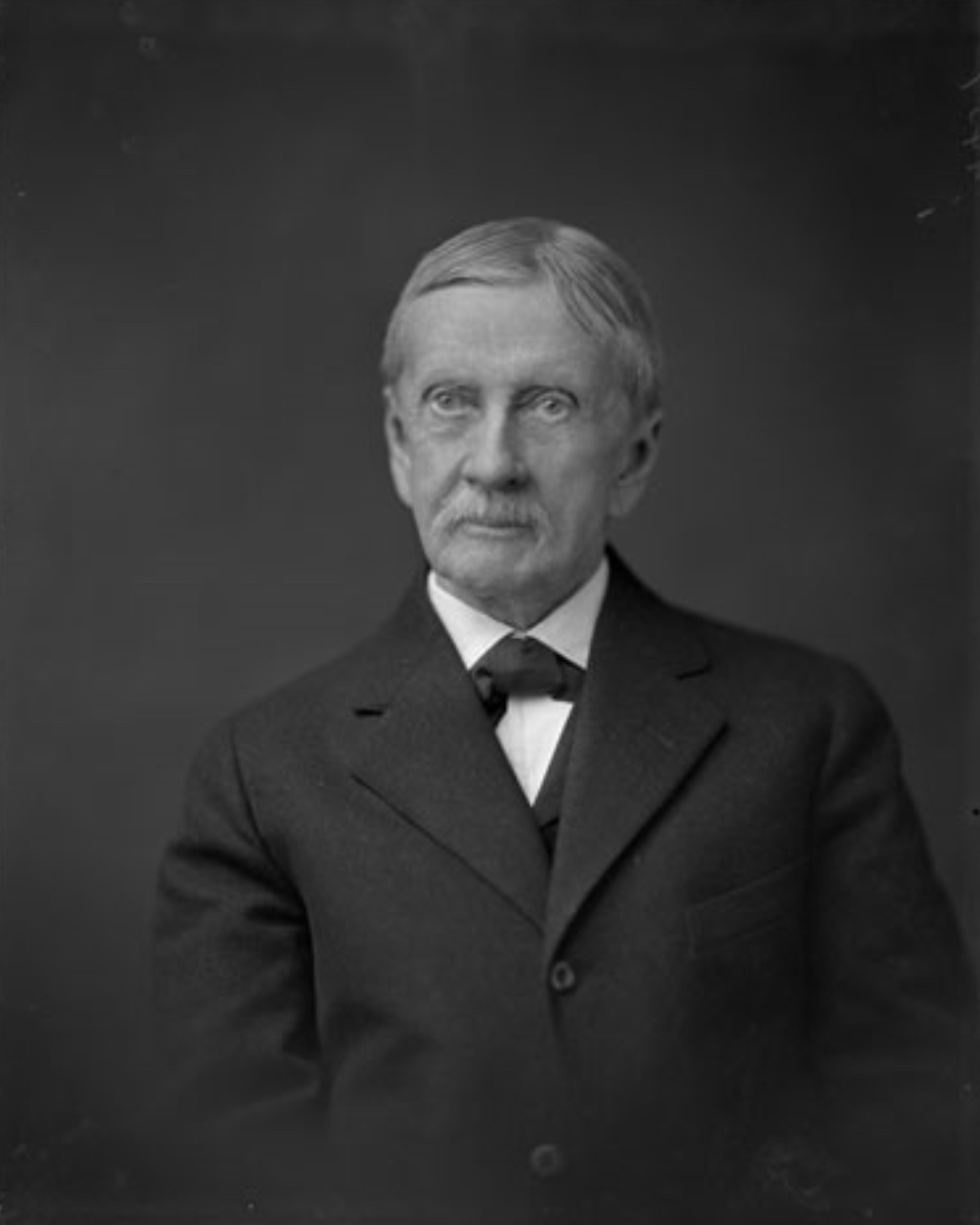
- Portrait of Winston, 1918

Member of the Virginia House of Delegates from Prince Edward County
- In office January 14, 1914 – January 14, 1920
- Preceded by: William H. Ewing
- Succeeded by: Edward T. Bondurant

Personal details
- Born: June 5, 1836 Richmond, Virginia, U.S.
- Died: January 30, 1920 (aged 83) Farmville, Virginia, U.S.
- Party: Democratic
- Spouse: Mollie Emma Rice
- Education: Hampden–Sydney College; University of Virginia; New York University

Military service
- Allegiance: Confederate States
- Branch/service: Confederate States Army
- Years of service: 1861–1865
- Rank: Assistant surgeon
- Battles/wars: American Civil War

Peter Winston (June 5, 1836 – January 30, 1920) was an American physician and Democratic politician who represented Prince Edward County in the Virginia House of Delegates from 1914 until shortly before his death in 1920.

He previously served in the Confederate Army during the Civil War and as mayor of Farmville, Virginia.

Peter Winston's great-grandfather, Peter Winston, was a first cousin of Patrick Henry and a grandson of Rev. Peter Fontaine.

Virginia House of Delegates
Preceded by William H. Ewing	Virginia Delegate for Prince Edward County; 1914–1920	Succeeded by Edward T. Bondurant
