= William H. Ewing =

American politician (1841–1924)

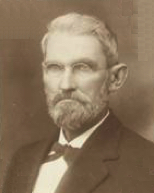

Member of the Virginia House of Delegates from Prince Edward County
- In office January 12, 1910 – January 14, 1914
- Preceded by: John J. Owen
- Succeeded by: Peter Winston

Personal details
- Born: William Henry Ewing; March 22, 1841 Prince Edward, Virginia, U.S.
- Died: September 2, 1924 (aged 83) Prince Edward, Virginia, U.S.
- Party: Democratic
- Spouse: Margaret Vaughan
- Education: Hampden–Sydney College

Military service
- Allegiance: Confederate States
- Branch/service: Confederate States Army
- Unit: 3rd Virginia Cavalry
- Battles/wars: American Civil War

William Henry Ewing (March 22, 1841 – September 2, 1924) was an American Democratic politician who represented Prince Edward County in the Virginia House of Delegates from 1910 to 1914.

Virginia House of Delegates
Preceded by John J. Owen	Virginia Delegate for Prince Edward County; 1910–1914	Succeeded by Peter Winston
