= W. Dennis Kendig =

American politician (1880–1948)

Member of the Virginia Senate from the 9th district
- In office January 14, 1948 – March 16, 1948
- Preceded by: Robert K. Brock
- Succeeded by: George W. Palmer

Personal details
- Born: Walter Dennis Kendig; May 29, 1880 Spotsylvania, Virginia, U.S.
- Died: March 16, 1948 (aged 67) Farmville, Virginia, U.S.
- Party: Democratic
- Spouse: Helen Murray Yates
- Education: Medical College of Virginia

Walter Dennis Kendig (May 29, 1880 – March 16, 1948) was a Virginian politician. He was born in Spotsylvania County, Virginia on his father's farm on May 29, 1880 to Samuel E. Kendig and Miverva Eudora Fleming. He had a twin brother, Benjamin, and they were the eldest of 8 children. Kendig was educated at Bell Air Academy in Lewiston, Virginia and graduated from the Medical College of Virginia in 1905 as a physician and surgeon. He married Helen Murray Yates and they settled in Kenbridge in Lunenburg County where Dr. Kendig was active in the Baptist Church, the Masons, Phi Beta Pi, Kenbridge Chamber of Commerce (former president). He was also on the Board of Visitors of Medical College of Virginia, the Board of Directors of the Bank of Lunenburg, Past President of the Fourth District Medical Society, Medical Society of Virginia (vice president, former member of council and chairman, ethics committee), Southern Medical Association, American Medical Association, Lunenburg County Medical Society (past president), Southside Medical Society.

== Political career ==
Kendig was also a member of the Virginia Democratic Central Committee, and Chairman of the Lunenburg County Democratic Committee. In 1947, Kendig was elected to the Virginia Senate representing the 9th District. He served in one session of the General Assembly in 1948.

== Death ==
Kendig died of a heart attack March 16, 1948 at Farmville, Virginia, shortly after he had concluded a speech before the Farmville Rotary Club.

Senate of Virginia
Preceded by Robert K. Brock	Virginia Senate, District 9; 1948	Succeeded by George W. Palmer
