= Willis Perry Bocock =

19th-century American politician

Willis P. Bocock

7th Attorney General of Virginia
- In office January 1, 1852 – May 15, 1857
- Governor: John B. Floyd; Joseph Johnson; Henry A. Wise
- Preceded by: Sidney Smith Baxter
- Succeeded by: John Randolph Tucker

Member of the Virginia House of Delegates from Buckingham County
- In office December 1, 1845 – December 6, 1847
- Preceded by: William M. Moseley
- Succeeded by: William M. Moseley

Personal details
- Born: Willis Perry Bocock; February 22, 1807 Buckingham, Virginia, U.S.
- Died: March 14, 1887 (aged 80) Hale, Alabama, U.S.
- Party: Democratic
- Relatives: Thomas S. Bocock (brother)
- Education: University of Virginia
- Occupation: Lawyer; politician

Willis Perry Bocock (February 22, 1807 – March 14, 1887) was a nineteenth-century American politician from Virginia. He served as the Attorney General of Virginia, as a member of the Virginia General Assembly, and as a representative to the Virginia Constitutional Convention of 1850.

== Early life ==
Bocock was born in Buckingham County, Virginia in 1807, before it split to form Appomattox County. He was educated at the University of Virginia, receiving a Bachelor of Laws degree in 1835.

== Career ==
The Virginia Capitol at Richmond VA where 19th century Conventions met

As an adult, Bocock established a law practice in Appomattox, and served several terms in the General Assembly.

Bocock served as the Virginia Attorney General from 1852 to 1857.

In 1850, Bocock was elected to the Virginia Constitutional Convention of 1850. He was one of three delegates elected from the Southside delegate district made up of his home district of Appomattox County, as well as Charlotte and Prince Edward Counties.

A dangerous fall made him a cripple, and he resigned his Attorney General's office, relocating to Macon, Hale County, Alabama where he "led the life of a private gentleman."

== Death ==
Willis Perry Bocock died in Macon, Hale County, Alabama in 1887.

== Bibliography ==
- Pulliam, David Loyd (1901). The Constitutional Conventions of Virginia from the foundation of the Commonwealth to the present time. John T. West, Richmond. ISBN 978-1-2879-2059-5.

Legal offices
Preceded by Sidney Smith Baxter	Attorney General of Virginia; 1852–1857	Succeeded by John Randolph Tucker
