= Asa D. Watkins =

American politician (1856–1938)

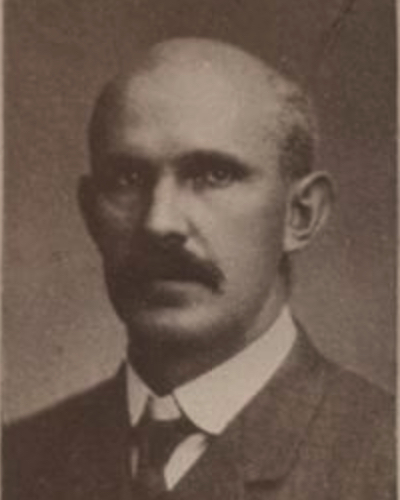

Member of the Virginia Senate from the 30th district
- In office December 6, 1899 – January 13, 1904
- Preceded by: Joseph W. Southall
- Succeeded by: William Shands

Member of the Virginia House of Delegates from Prince Edward County
- In office December 1, 1897 – December 6, 1899
- Preceded by: Colin Stokes
- Succeeded by: John J. Owen

Commonwealth's Attorney for Prince Edward County
- In office 1891–1897

Personal details
- Born: Asa Dickinson Watkins; June 1856 Farmville, Virginia, U.S.
- Died: April 14, 1938 (aged 81) Farmville, Virginia, U.S.
- Resting place: Farmville Cemetery; Farmville, Virginia, U.S.
- Party: Democratic
- Spouse: Nannie Edwards Forbes (m. 1886)
- Children: 8
- Parent: Francis N. Watkins (father)
- Education: Hampden–Sydney College; University of Virginia

Asa Dickinson Watkins (June 1856 – April 14, 1938) was an American judge and politician who served as a member of the Virginia House of Delegates and Virginia Senate.

== Early life ==
Asa Dickinson Watkins was born on June 5 (or 6), 1856, at "Ingleside" near Farmville, Virginia, to Martha Ann (née Scott) and Francis N. Watkins, a judge, banker, and churchman. His paternal grandfather Henry E. Watkins was a member of the Virginia Senate. His great-grandfather Francis Watkins was a county clerk. He attended private schools in Prince Edward County, including Farmville High School. He attended Hampden-Sydney College. In 1878, he left college in his senior year. He then studied law under his father and, in 1880, attended lectures at the University of Virginia. He was admitted to the bar in 1884.

== Career ==
Watkins was a Democrat. He served as deputy clerk of the county court for seven years. He served as the sheriff of Prince Edward County from 1880 to 1881. He also worked in the cotton business in Birmingham, Alabama, for a short time.

After getting admitted to the bar, Watkins became the senior member of the law firm of Watkins and Brock. In 1886, he became judge of Prince Edward County but resigned that post in 1891 to become prosecuting attorney. Watkins represented Prince Edward County in the Virginia House of Delegates for the session of 1897-1898. He was elected to the Virginia Senate in 1899, representing Prince Edward, Cumberland, and Amelia counties. Watkins served as town attorney for Farmville from 1898 to his death.

Watkins served as the secretary-treasurer of the board of trustees of the State Female Normal School (later the State Teachers' College) in Farmville. He served as a trustee of Hampden-Sydney College from 1886 to 1932. He served as trustee of the Normal and Industrial Institute for Negroes (now Virginia State University) in Petersburg for 20 years. He was a member of the state inter-racial commission around 1922.

== Personal life ==
On September 2, 1886, Watkins married Nannie E. Forbes, daughter of Colonel William W. Forbes and Amonette Cobb Forbes, of Buckingham County. They had eight children: William Forbes, Samuel W., Mrs. Maurice Miller, Frank Nathaniel Watkins, Asa D., Patsy, Nancy, and foster daughter Mrs. Joseph Powell. He was a deacon and elder of the Presbyterian Church in Farmville.

Watkins died on April 14, 1938, at his home in Farmville. He is buried at Farmville Cemetery.

Virginia House of Delegates
Preceded by Colin Stokes	Virginia Delegate from Prince Edward County; 1897–1899	Succeeded by John J. Owen
Senate of Virginia
Preceded by Joseph W. Southall	Virginia Senator for the 30th District; 1899–1904	Succeeded by William Shands
