= William H. Cabell =

American judge (1772–1853)

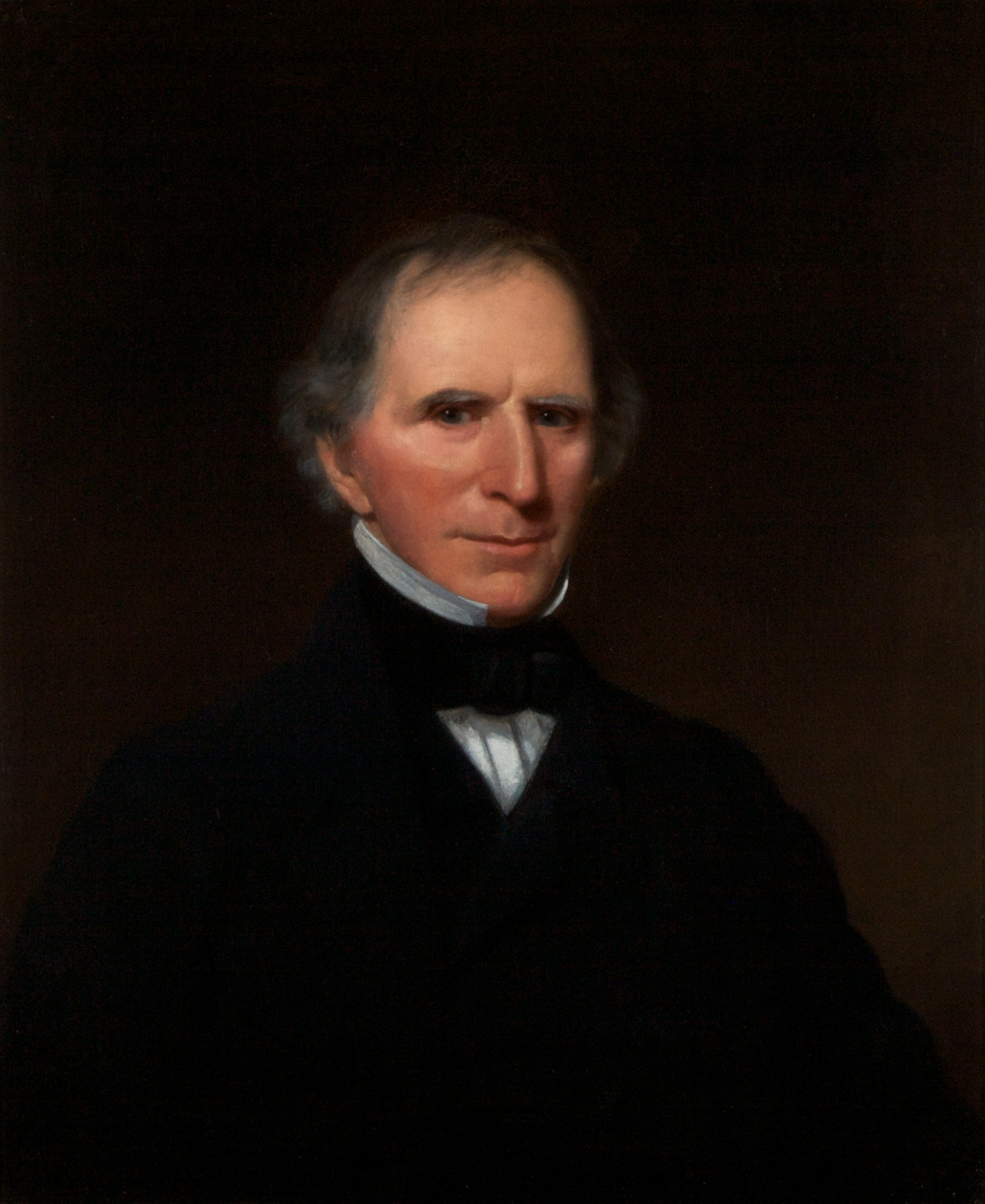
- Portrait of Cabell by William Garl Brown, c. 1850

14th Governor of Virginia
- In office December 7, 1805 – December 1, 1808
- Preceded by: John Page
- Succeeded by: John Tyler, Sr.

6th Chief Justice of Virginia
- In office January 18, 1842 – December 31, 1850
- Preceded by: Henry St. George Tucker, Sr.
- Succeeded by: John J. Allen

Justice of the Virginia Supreme Court
- In office March 21, 1811 – December 31, 1850

Member of the Virginia House of Delegates representing Amherst County
- In office November 8, 1796 – December 3, 1797 Serving with Joseph Burrus
- Preceded by: William Cabell Jr.
- Succeeded by: Joseph Shelton
- In office December 3, 1798 – November 30, 1799 Serving with William Ware
- Preceded by: Joseph Shelton
- Succeeded by: David S. Garland
- In office December 6, 1802 – January 1, 1805 Serving with John Camm, Hudson M. Garland
- Preceded by: David S. Garland
- Succeeded by: Charles Taliaferro

Personal details
- Born: December 16, 1772 Cumberland County, Colony of Virginia, British America
- Died: January 12, 1853 (aged 80) Richmond, Virginia, U.S.
- Party: Democratic-Republican
- Spouse(s): Elizabeth Cabell, Agnes S. B. Cabell
- Children: 7
- Education: Hampden-Sydney College College of William and Mary
- Profession: Planter, lawyer, judge

William H. Cabell (December 16, 1772 – January 12, 1853) was a Virginia lawyer, politician, plantation owner, and judge aligned with the Democratic-Republican party. He served as a Member of the Virginia House of Delegates, as Governor of Virginia, and as a judge on what later became the Virginia Supreme Court. Cabell adopted his middle initial in 1795—which did not stand for a name—to distinguish himself from other William Cabells, including his uncle, William Cabell Sr.

== Early life ==
Cabell was born at "Boston Hill" in Cumberland County in the Colony of Virginia on December 16, 1772, the eldest of the three surviving sons of Colonel (and burgess) Nicholas Cabell (1750–1803) and Hannah Carrington Cabell (1751–1817), both of the First Families of Virginia. His grandfather, Dr. William Cabell, had emigrated from Britain to Virginia and moved westward along the James River into Goochland County with his family. Nicholas was the youngest son (by his second wife). Through his father, Cabell was descended from Henry Daubeney, 1st Earl of Bridgewater, Giles Daubeney, 1st Baron Daubeney and Sir Giles Daubeney of England. Through his mother, he was descended from John Strangways. His uncles John Cabell, Joseph Cabell, and William Cabell also became prominent planters and government officials in the upper James River watershed, in what became Albemarle County, then Buckingham County and Amherst County in grandfather Dr. Cabell's lifetime. Nicholas Cabell inherited the Liberty Hall plantation where his grandfather died, and also had sons Joseph Carrington Cabell (who helped found the University of Virginia and served in both houses of the Virginia General Assembly) and Nicholas Cabell (who inherited Liberty Hall but died of tuberculosis). This Cabell's birth family also included daughter Mary Ann Cabell Carrington (1783–1850). At least fourteen members of the extended Cabell family would serve in Virginia's legislature before the American Civil War and six after the conflict.

Young William Cabell studied with private tutors and later attended and graduated from Hampden–Sydney College in 1789. He then moved to Williamsburg and attended the College of William and Mary, where he took legal courses from Judge St. George Tucker before graduating in July 1793. Young Cabell then moved to Richmond to read law.

== Career ==
Cabell began his legal career soon after his admission to the Virginia bar on June 13, 1794, and also followed in his father's footsteps in entering politics. However, he would also serve as a judge.

=== Political career ===
Amherst County voters first elected William H. Cabell to the Virginia House of Delegates to succeed his cousin William Cabell Jr. (after this man adopted his distinguishing initial) in 1796. This William Cabell had lived with his uncle William Cabell Sr. and cousin William Cabell Jr. at their plantation called "Union Hill" near Liberty Hall. His uncle had represented Amherst County in the legislature for more than three decades—after its foundation from Albemarle County, had also at times held all executive and judicial offices in the county until his death, at which point William Jr. had succeeded to the part-time legislative position. However, he proved not as strong a candidate as his father, hence this man's political entry. Although Amherst County voters failed to re-elect William H. Cabell after that term, he would serve multiple separate terms as one of Amherst County's two (part-time) delegates before moving across the James River into Buckingham County. In one of his early legislative terms, Cabell voted for the Virginia resolutions against the alien and sedition laws designed to impede his political party. Cabell also served as a Republican presidential elector in 1800 and 1804.

In 1804, legislators elected him as the 14th governor of Virginia, and he served from 1805 to 1808. While he was Virginia's governor, the British sloop of war Leopard attacked the frigate Chesapeake off Norfolk (the Chesapeake–Leopard affair later known as a forerunner of the War of 1812) and former Virginia governor Thomas Jefferson ordered the arrest of Vice President Aaron Burr for the Burr conspiracy. Burr went on trial for treason in Richmond because much of the planning took place in lands Virginia once claimed in the Ohio Valley. Still, he was acquitted as U.S. Supreme Court Chief Justice John Marshall (a fellow Richmond resident) found insufficient evidence of treason, although many conspiracies.

=== Planter ===
The extended Cabell family owned many plantations and mills along the James River watershed. Over time they bought and sold land and enslaved people to operate those plantations. However, some records are lost, and similar names of his cousins complicate differentiation. In the early 1800s, Cabell's main plantation was in Buckingham County that he bought from his uncle Joseph Cabell (who had called it "Repton"). He renamed "Montevideo" and lived with his family and widowed mother until her death. He sold the plantation in the late 1820s and moved his family to Richmond. Thus, the 1820 federal census confirms he lived in New Canton, a township in Buckingham County, and owned 48 enslaved males (19 of them boys) and 50 enslaved females (including 19 girls), most of whom probably worked in the tobacco fields, or possibly cultivated wheat and corn and other market crops. However, federal records did not individually identify enslaved people until 1850, the last census in this man's life. Thus, in 1840, Judge Cabell's Richmond household included four enslaved boys younger than sixteen years old, two enslaved men between 16 and 24 years old, three enslaved women between 25 and 35 years old, and one woman in the 36 to 55-year-old category. He presumably had provided dowries for daughters mentioned in another section and start-up capital for sons. In the final census of his life, Judge Cabell's Richmond household, in addition to two adult sons (William W. Cabell and Henry Cabell and his wife), also included 60, 50, and 31-year-old women, mulatto girls aged 7 and 8, and mulatto boys aged 15 and 11, probably all working as domestic servants. A similar number of enslaved people were owned by his eldest son, Dr. Robert G. Cabell, who lived next door with his family.

=== Judicial career ===
As his gubernatorial term ended, in December 1808, the General Assembly elected Cabell a judge of the general court, so he sat in Amherst or Buckingham County, or both. Two years later, legislators selected him for a vacant Supreme Court of Appeals seat. He began serving on that court on March 21, 1811, and served continuously for more than four decades. In "Stevenson v. Singleton, 1 Leigh 72 (1829), he refused to allow an enslaved person to buy his freedom. During the court's reorganization in 1831, Cabell was again selected to the new court, where he became president on January 18, 1842. He remained in this position until 1850, but during the last year before his resignation had several absences due to ill health.

== Personal life ==
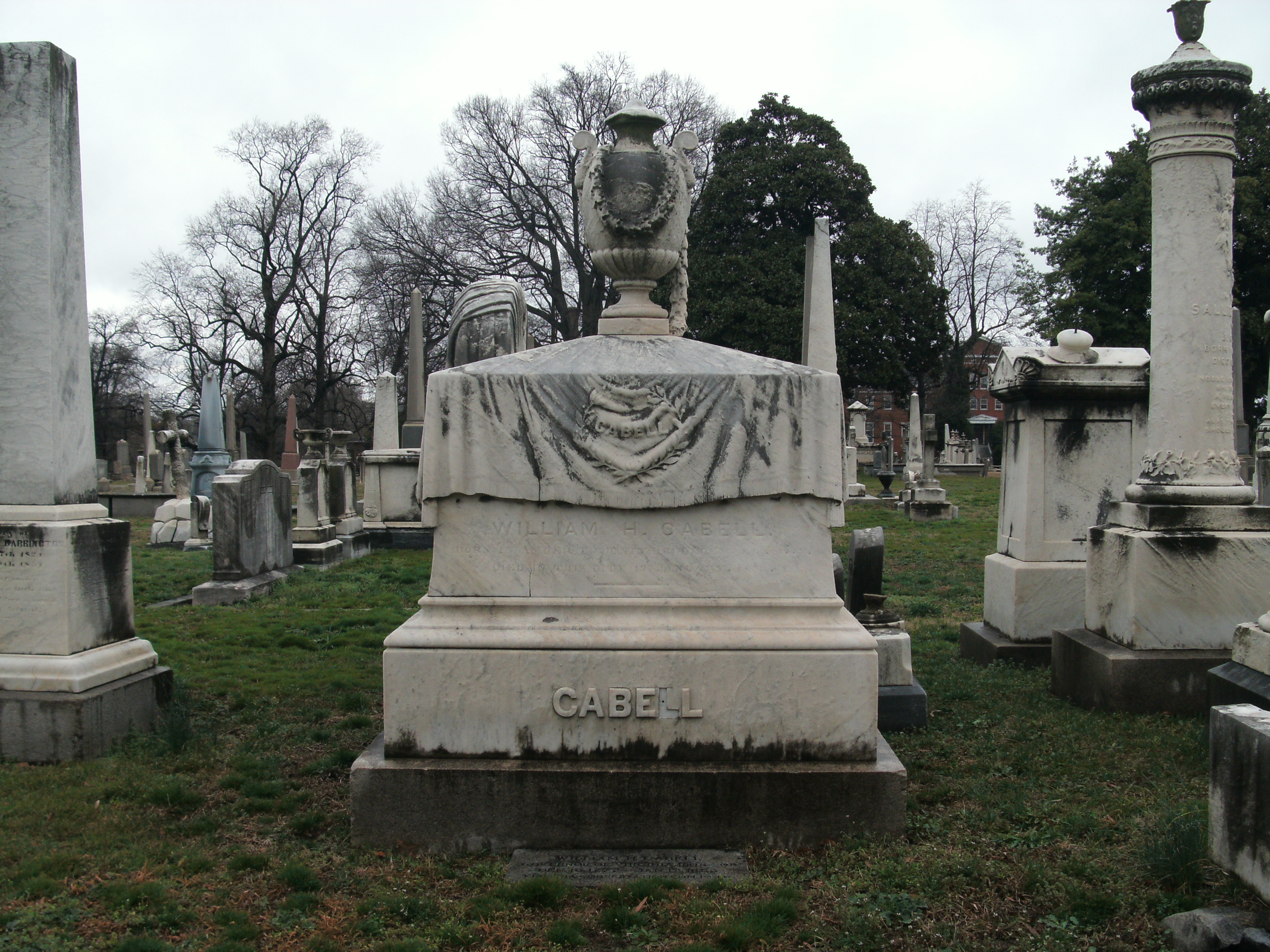
Cabell's grave at Shockoe Hill Cemetery

Cabell built the Midway Mill in 1787, which later was listed on the National Register of Historic Places but demolished in 1998. In 1795, back in Amherst County, William Cabell married Elizabeth Cabell (1774–1801), but they had no children who survived. After her death, on March 11, 1805, he married Agnes Sarah Bell Gamble, eldest daughter of Colonel Robert Gamble, of Richmond. Their children included:

- Emma Catherine Cabell Carrington (1808–1887)
- Robert Gamble Cabell (1809–1889)
- Elizabeth Hannah Cabell Daniel (1811–1892)
- William Wirt Cabell (1813–1891)
- Edward Carrington Cabell (1816–1896), who moved to Florida and served in its legislature, as well as the U.S. Congress.
- John Grattan Cabell (1817–1896)
- Henry Coalter Cabell (1820–1889).

In 1840, Judge Cabell's household comprised seven free white persons and ten slaves (2 adult men, 4 boys under age 10, and 4 adult women). In 1850, he and Agnes lived with lawyer sons William Cabell (aged 35) and Henry Cabell (age 30) and his wife and at least the enslaved people mentioned earlier.

== Death and legacy ==
Cabell died on January 12, 1853, in Richmond, Virginia and was interred in Shockoe Hill Cemetery.

The Library of Virginia holds Cabell's executive papers (as governor of Virginia).

Cabell County, West Virginia was named in his honor, as is a residence hall at William & Mary.

Author James Branch Cabell was one of his great-grandsons.

Political offices
Preceded by John Page	Governor of Virginia; 1805–1808	Succeeded by John Tyler, Sr.
