= Emerson Institute =

School for African American students in Mobile, Alabama, US

Emerson Institute was a school for African American students in Mobile, Alabama. It was established after the American Civil War in 1865 by the Freedmen's Bureau. It was operated by the American Missionary Association (A.M.A.) and opened in 1866.

== History ==
Originally located in the "Blue College" on Government Street, in 1877 it was relocated to 266 Scott Street after a fire.

In 1927 it became a Mobile County public school. According to the historical marker commemorating its history, "Many of its students had careers of local and national distinction." After desegregation, the school closed in 1970 and the buildings demolished as part of an urban renewal program in Mobile. A historical marker commemorates the school's site on Scott Street.

Tulane University has a photo of a visitor from the A.M.A. with the school's faculty. Another photo shows people from the school outside with a dog. A 1909 commencement program is extant and available online. A 1909-10 school catalogue also survives. An "illustrated essay" from the school's principal A. T. Burnell with photos and descriptions of the school and its history also survives.
