= Peter Fontaine =

The Reverend Peter Fontaine
- Born: Pierre Fontaine; 1691; Taunton, Somerset, England
- Died: 1757 (aged 65–66); Williamsburg, Virginia

Peter Fontaine (1691–1757) was a clergyman at Westover Church, Westover Parish, Charles City County, Virginia.

== Family ==
Coat of Arms of Peter Fontaine

His parents, of noble French Huguenot extraction, were forced to leave for England, later Great Britain, and then Ireland after the revocation of the Edict of Nantes with the Edict of Fontainebleau in October 1685. His father Jacques de la Fontaine (later James Fontaine) was also a Reverend, while his mother was Anne Elizabeth Boursiquot. He had three older siblings and four younger siblings. His sister Mary Anne Fontaine Maury was the mother of Rev. James Maury and the great-grandmother of Matthew Fontaine Maury.

Peter Fontaine first married Elizabeth "Lizzie" Forreau, the granddaughter of Captain Boulay, a French gentleman. They had a daughter Mary Ann Fontaine and Peter Fontaine, Jr. Mary Fontaine Winston married Isaac Winston, an uncle of Patrick Henry. After Elizabeth Fontaine's death, Peter Fontaine remarried. By her, he had several children.

== Quote ==
Dear brother, feed much on soup and vegetables, and good fruits; and in the winter good salad oil with endive, dandelion, and other bitter salads at your meals, will help digestion, cut the tough phlegm which engenders the pleurisy, make good blood, and keep the body in good order. I know you eat little meat. Taking the air on horseback in fine weather, and your employment in your garden, will keep you healthy and cheerful, with God's blessing. Be pleased with little things, such as the flourishing of a tree or a plant, or a bed of flowers, and fret not at disappointments. Why may not the growth of your trees afford you as much pleasure as the flourishing of a colony does to His Majesty, who hath as many, God bless him! as you have trees. Excuse this piece of quackery. I give you the same advice I follow myself, and am with great sincerity, dear brother, Your affectionate, humble servant, Peter Fontaine.

Peter Fontaine to his brother Moses, 14 Feb. 1750–1, in Memoirs of a Huguenot Family, p. 358.
