= Union flag (disambiguation) =

The Union Flag or Union Jack is the name of the flag of the United Kingdom.

Union flag may also refer to:

- Continental Union Flag, first national flag of the United States
- Flag of the African Union
- Flag of Europe, also called the Flag of the European Union
- Flag of the Kalmar Union
- Flag of the Soviet Union
- Flag of the Union of South Africa
- Flag of the United States (also called "Union")
  - Union flag, of the Union during the American Civil War
  - Jack of the United States, currently being called a Union Jack, is the jack of the United States Navy and essentially the canton of the United States flag
- Union mark of Sweden and Norway
- The Union Flag, newspaper published in Tennessee
