= Jimmy Neil Smith =

American storyteller (1947–2025)

Jimmy Neil Smith (April 13, 1947 – March 15, 2025) was the founder and president emeritus of the International Storytelling Center (ISC) in Jonesborough, Tennessee. In 1973, Smith, then a local journalism teacher, hosted the first National Storytelling Festival as a way to build regional and national awareness of Jonesborough. Smith's efforts led to a revival of storytelling in the US. Jonesborough is today referred to as the Storytelling Capital of the World.

== Early life ==
Smith was born in a pre-Civil War house on his grandparents' farm in rural Washington County, Tennessee – just eight miles from Jonesborough. Smith and his parents, Fred Neil and Dorothy Jackson Smith, moved to Jonesborough when he was about two years old. A sister, Jill, was born into the family in 1951. Smith graduated from East Tennessee State University in nearby Johnson City, Tennessee, with a BS degree in English, history, and journalism.

== Career ==
During high school and college, Smith was a reporter for the weekly Herald and Tribune in Jonesborough and the daily Johnson City Press. While a journalist at the Press, he wrote Heritage in Buckskin, a weekly column featuring the history of the region. The columns were published in two small books. Upon graduation in 1969, Smith began teaching English—and later, journalism—at Science Hill High School in Johnson City. Smith also developed and directed a public information program for the Johnson City Schools to disseminate information and news about the school system, its teachers and administrators, and its students. When Smith was driving some of his journalism students to a nearby town to print the school newspaper, they were listening to comedian and storyteller Jerry Clower on the car radio tell a story about hunting in Mississippi. At that time, Smith turned to his students and suggested that Jonesborough should host a storytelling festival with storytellers, like Clower. Soon thereafter, Smith began contemplating a storytelling festival. He wanted to save the old, traditional stories of the Southern Appalachians for future generations, and he wanted to join other residents of Jonesborough who wanted to save the dying town and rebuild its economy. Smith hoped a storytelling festival could help accomplish both.

In 1973, Smith founded the National Storytelling Festival, the first public event dedicated exclusively to the tradition and art of storytelling anywhere in the world. Staged in Jonesborough, the Festival ignited a revival, a new appreciation, of storytelling that has spread across America and the world. Two years after the first Festival, Smith founded the National Association for the Preservation and Perpetuation, the organization that would become the International Storytelling Center. In 2002, ISC opened a facility in downtown Jonesborough that serves as a headquarters for the organization and a beacon for storytelling throughout the world.

In 1978, Smith was elected mayor of Jonesborough and served three two-year terms. Because of its ever-expanding storytelling program, Jonesborough, the oldest town in Tennessee, is being called the Storytelling Capital of the World.

Smith died on March 15, 2025, at the age of 77.

== Notable publications ==
In 1987, Smith compiled and edited Homespun, a book of stories, profiles of America's leading storytellers, and how-to information. Following the release of Homespun, Smith compiled and edited Why the Possum's Tail is Bare—a collection of Southern folktales, legends, and other stories. As president of the International Storyteller Center (ISC), he published a series of additional books and recordings featuring the world's stories and storytellers. Smith was a contributor to the Anthology Storytelling project as a regular reflection on storytelling.
