= Syd Lieberman =

American storyteller

Sydney Lieberman (1944 – May 12, 2015) was a noted American storyteller who began performing professionally in 1982. He was born in Chicago.

He was a frequent performer at the National Storytelling Festival in Jonesborough, Tennessee. In 2007, Lieberman became the first professional storyteller in the United States to make all tracks from his previously released 14 CDs and cassettes available as a free download from his website via a Creative commons license (by-nc-nd). He died after a stroke in Evanston, Illinois in 2015.

== Commissions ==
Lieberman was known for his ability to write and tell the story behind historical events. He created performances commissioned by the city of Johnstown, Pennsylvania, the Smithsonian Institution (for the National Air and Space Museum), Van Andel Museum Center, NASA, and Historic Philadelphia.

Twelve Wheels on Mars

In late 2003, NASA and the International Storytelling Center commissioned Lieberman to tell the story of the Mars Exploration Mission. He interviewed the principal scientists and engineers involved in the project, and was present in 2004 at the Jet Propulsion Laboratory in Pasadena, California, to witness the historic landing. Lieberman's story introduces the people involved in the mission and depicts their emotions they felt as they built and sent two rovers on a seven-month, 40,000,000-mile trip to Mars.
