= Andy Offutt Irwin =

American singer-songwriter (born 1957)

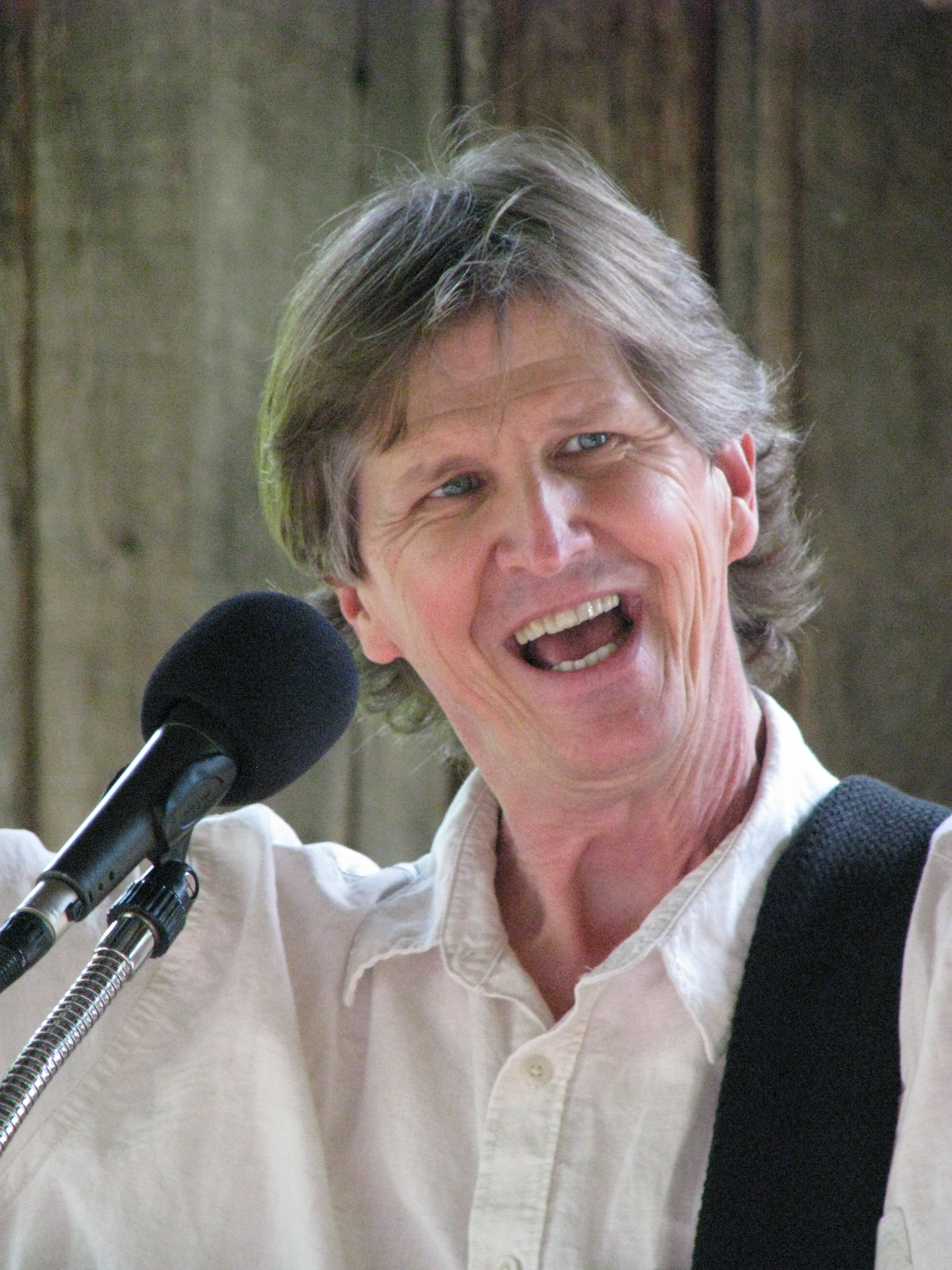

Background information
- Born: December 14, 1957 (age 68); Covington, Georgia
- Occupations: Storyteller, singer-songwriter, whistler
- Instruments: Guitar, percussion
- Years active: 1984–present
- Website: AndyIrwin.com

Andy Offutt Irwin (born December 14, 1957) is an American storyteller, singer-songwriter, and humorist. Born and raised in Covington, Georgia, a small town outside of Atlanta, Irwin began his career in 1984 with an improvisational comedy troupe at Walt Disney World. After five years he shifted to performing as a singer-songwriter, touring the Southeast. In the mid-1990s, Irwin branched into performances for children.

Irwin continued to perform as a singer-songwriter and added storytelling to these performances, usually telling one story (about ten to twenty-five minutes in length) during a show. In the fall of 2004, he decided to pursue storytelling as a career and quickly achieved national prominence. Irwin now appears regularly in storytelling festivals across the United States. As of 2024, he has released 14 albums which feature stories, songs or whistling and has collected numerous awards for them. In 2013, Irwin received the Circle of Excellence Award from the National Storytelling Network.

== Background and early career ==
Andy Offutt Irwin is a native of Covington, Georgia, a small town in the United States' Deep South about 35 miles east of Atlanta. As a youth, Irwin discovered his talent for imitating different sounds and the speech of others. He was a whistler as a boy, realizing at around age 10 that not everyone could whistle songs. In college, he would whistle next to his band teacher, who'd play the flute.

Irwin later attended Georgia College & State University in Milledgeville, Georgia, where he received a B.S. in Sociology in 1983.

Beginning in 1991, Irwin toured the Southeast as a singer-songwriter. From 1995 to 2001, Irwin sang humorous songs, played guitar, and performed comedy as "Offutt the Minstrel" at the Georgia Renaissance Festival. He also performed at the Kansas City Renaissance Festival during the 1980s.

== Storytelling ==
=== Evolution as a storyteller ===
Around 1996 while performing at the Georgia Renaissance Festival (GARF), Irwin met nationally prominent storyteller Carmen Deedy. Deedy had previously been a GARF performer and was joining several current performers for dinner after the festival. After spending several hours interacting over dinner, Deedy said to Irwin, "You're a storyteller". After seeing Irwin perform at Eddie's Attic, Deedy explained the storytelling circuit, and encouraged Irwin to develop his storytelling, splitting a storytelling show with Irwin at Atlanta's 14th Street Playhouse. Leaving his guitar at home, "to stretch myself a bit," it was Irwin's first storytelling gig. In 2005, Irwin appeared as a Featured New Voices Storyteller at the National Storytelling Festival.

=== Storytelling as a performance form ===
Prior to deciding to become a full-time storyteller, Irwin worked as a comedian "for a few minutes". However, Irwin came to see that the days of storytelling comedians had passed. Irwin also realized that his style of performance was at odds with the main venue available to comedians today: comedy clubs. (Irwin has jokingly referred to comedy clubs as "evil, smelly places".) Some of his stories are an hour in length, and Irwin notes, "[t]here was a time when comedians could do that but they can't anymore because the clubs give them three minutes, and they are timing the laughs per minute." Using storytelling as a theatrical form allows Irwin to create more fully drawn characters and to explore darker subject matters as well. "Although I like to think of my storytelling as funny, I can have these serious moments. I'm not depending on the audience to laugh the whole time ... I hope there's content with the form."

Irwin "takes the humor very seriously ... I remember being a little kid wondering why we laugh and what makes me laugh. I always was a class clown. I was always interested in what makes laughter happen and now I get to dig into the theory of it every day." Irwin thinks of himself as a fiction writer and refers to himself as a humorist, and states, "I call myself a humorist and storyteller instead of a comedian because I play in libraries and there's no three-drink minimum." Irwin's stories often reflect life in a small Southern town with recurring themes of growing up and growing old, the bonds of family, the complexities of racial relations in the Deep South, especially during the 1960s and the important art of the practical joke.

== Characters ==
Many of Irwin's stories revolve around his fictional aunt, Dr. Marguerite Van Camp, whom he describes as being about 85 years old. She and her friends founded Southern White Old Lady Hospital in rural Georgia because (as Irwin explains in Marguerite's old lady voice) "all our husbands have moved on, and we were tired of the garden club and the bridge club and the ladies club. So Mary Frances and Julia and I all went back to medical school." Irwin loosely based the character of Marguerite on his mother ("unabashed and delightfully inappropriate") and his maternal grandmother ("a genteel, bun-haired lady of means"). As Irwin explains, "I was raised by Southern women so I imitate a lot of them. Marguerite is the voice of my grandmother, who was born in 1894, and the attitude of my mother. And anything that I want to gripe about I put into [Marguerite's] voice and nobody feels bad about me."

Two other recurring characters in Irwin's stories, Johnny and his brother Kenny, are actual people whom he knew as a child. When the all-white elementary school that Irwin attended in the 1960s was forced to integrate, he became classmates with Johnny Norrington, an African American. They became good friends despite lingering racial barriers. In his story "The Rudiments" on Banana Seat, Irwin describes an accident he caused while riding his bike on a visit to the Norringtons' all-black neighborhood. Genuinely afraid of retaliation, Irwin was whisked to safety by the boys' mother. On the album Bootsie in Season, Irwin recalls how he and Johnny managed to watch the movie Dr. Terror's House of Horrors together despite Johnny having to sit in the "colored section" in the balcony while Irwin watched from the level below.

Other frequent characters include:

- Charles, Marguerite's husband who briefly served in the Georgia state legislature and liked to quote Shakespeare out of context for comic effect
- Mary Frances, a friend of Marguerite and fellow doctor at Southern White Old Lady Hospital
- Sally Lynette, a friend of Marguerite who sells real estate
- Francine, Marguerite's daughter who works as a medical researcher and is described as suffering from "humor deficit disorder" (HDD)
- Drusilla, Francine's daughter who plays jazz trumpet
- Chaz, Drusilla's young son who is on the autism spectrum
- Ike Balthazar, whom Marguerite had babysat during her teenage years and who begins a relationship with her after a chance meeting

== Discography ==
- Banana Seat (1995)
- Christmas at Southern White Old Lady Hospital (2004)
- Book Every Saturday for a Funeral (2006)
- Bootsie in Season (2007)
- Crowd Control (2008)
- Lip Service (2010)
- Risk Assessment (2011)
- Sister True (2013)
- Andy's Wild Amphibian Show! (2015)
- Squeaky on the Roof (2017)
- Love and Armadillo Migration (2017)
- Flaked, Puffed, Shredded, & Clustered (2018)
- Perpetual Calendar (2019)
- Free the Imprisoned Lightning (2024)
