= National Storytelling Festival =

American annual storytelling festival held in Jonesborough, Tennessee

The National Storytelling Festival is held the first full weekend of October in Jonesborough, Tennessee at the International Storytelling Center. The National Storytelling Festival was founded by Jimmy Neil Smith, a high school journalism teacher, in 1973. It has grown over the years to become a major festival both in the United States and internationally.

== History ==
In 1973, Jimmy Neil Smith, a high school journalism teacher, and a carload of students heard Grand Ole Opry regular Jerry Clower spin a tale over the radio about coon hunting in Mississippi. Smith was inspired by that event to create a story telling festival in Northeast Tennessee.

In October 1973, the first National Storytelling Festival was held in Jonesborough, Tennessee. Hay bales and wagons were the stages, and audience and tellers together didn't number more than 60.

Two years after the first festival, Smith founded the National Association for the Preservation and Perpetuation of Storytelling (NAPPS), an organization that led America's storytelling renaissance. In 1994, the name of the organization was shortened to the National Storytelling Association (NSA). Another name change occurred in 1998, when NSA "divided into two separate organizations, National Storytelling Network (NSN) and International Storytelling Center (ISC)". Today, the ISC promotes the power of storytelling and the creative applications of this ancient tradition to enrich the human experience in the home, at the workplace, and throughout the world. The National Storytelling Network is a membership organization, "connecting people to and through storytelling".

== The Festival ==
Produced by the International Storytelling Center, the three-day outdoor festival features performances by internationally known artists. In existence for almost 50 years, the Festival attracts nearly 11,000 audience members annually, including school groups whose students attend as an educational experience.

The festival builds on the Appalachian cultural tradition of storytelling. Held under circus tents scattered throughout Jonesborough, storytellers sit on stages or at the head of the tent to perform. There are usually five or six tents in close proximity so that festival goers can easily walk from tent to tent and from performance to performance.

Past storytellers include Pete Seeger, Carmen Agra Deedy, Jay O'Callahan, Donald Davis, Syd Lieberman, Andy Offutt Irwin, Sheila Kay Adams, and Kathryn Tucker Windham. The festival has expanded to include the growing ranks of Youth Storytellers, including showcasing participants and winners of the National Youth Storytelling Showcase. The festival influenced the development of a storytelling graduate degree program at the nearby East Tennessee State University.
