= Jonesborough, Tennessee =

Oldest town in Tennessee, United States

Jonesborough
- Town
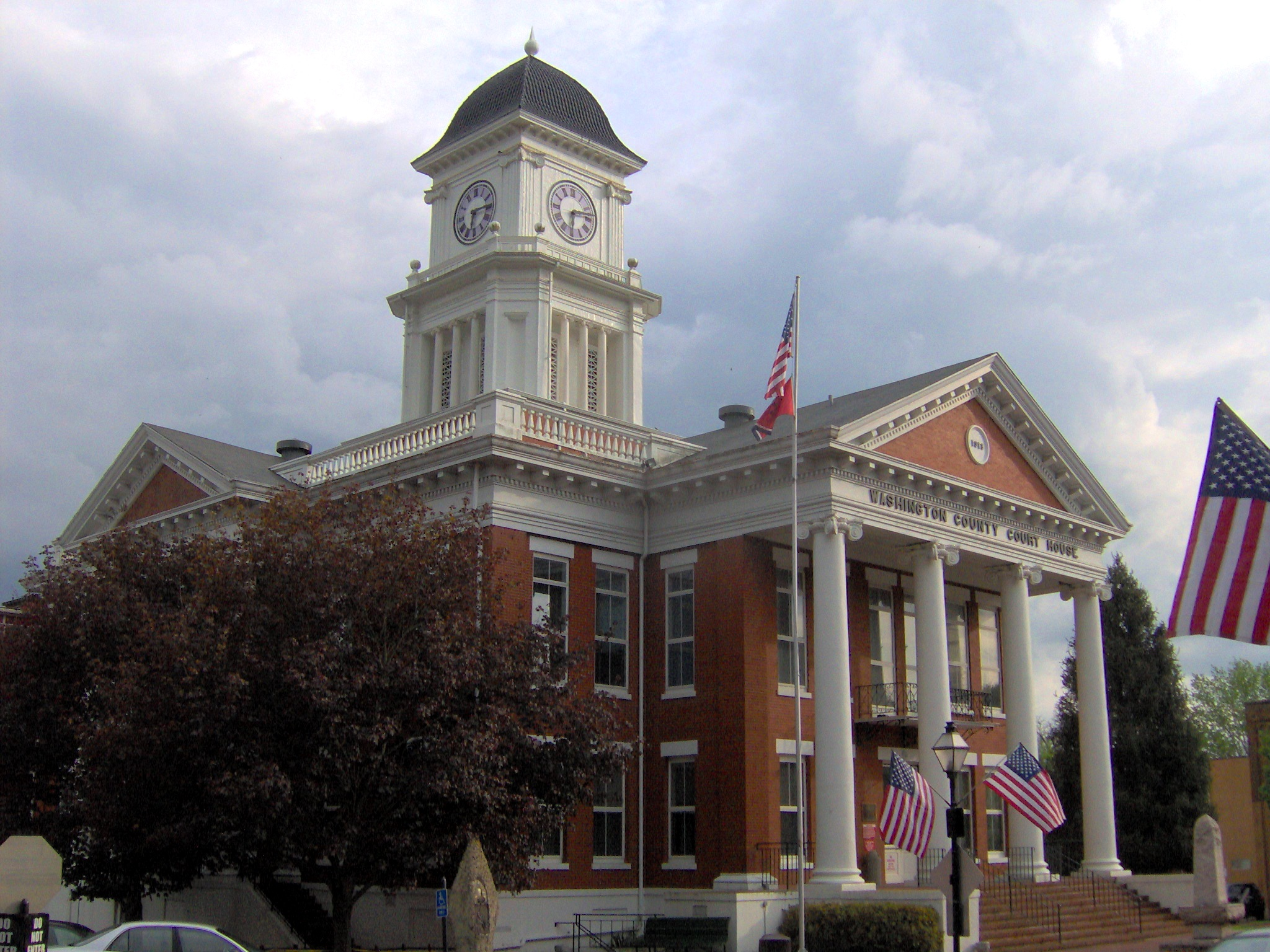
- Washington County Courthouse in Jonesborough

- Logo
- Nicknames: Tennessee's Oldest Town, Storytelling Capital of the World
- Location of Jonesborough in Washington County, Tennessee.
- Coordinates: 36°17′39″N 82°28′21″W
- Country: United States
- State: Tennessee
- County: Washington
- Incorporated: 1779
- Named for: Willie Jones

Government
  - Type: Mayor-council-administrator
  - Mayor: Kelly Wolfe
  - Town Administrator: Glenn Rosenoff
  - Town Council: Aldermen: Stephen Callahan; Virginia Causey; Terry Countermine; Adam Dickson

Area
  - Total: 5.32 sq mi (13.79 km^{2})
  - Land: 5.32 sq mi (13.79 km^{2})
  - Water: 0 sq mi (0.00 km^{2})
- Elevation: 1,729 ft (527 m)

Population (2020)
  - Total: 5,860
  - Density: 1,100.7/sq mi (424.98/km^{2})
- Time zone: UTC-5 (Eastern (EST))
  - Summer (DST): UTC-4 (EDT)
- ZIP code: 37659
- Area code: 423
- FIPS code: 47-38540
- GNIS feature ID: 2405919
- Website: www.jonesborough.com

Jonesborough (/ˈdʒoʊnzbʌrə/; historically also Jonesboro) is a town in and the county seat of Washington County, Tennessee, in the Southeastern United States. Its population was 5,860 as of 2020. It is "Tennessee's oldest town".

Jonesborough is part of the Johnson City metropolitan area, which is a component of the "Tri-Cities" region.

== History ==
Located in the far northeast corner of the state, Jonesborough was founded by European Americans in 1779, 17 years before Tennessee became a state and while the area was under the jurisdiction of North Carolina. It was named after North Carolina legislator Willie Jones, who had supported the state's westward expansion across the Appalachian Mountains.

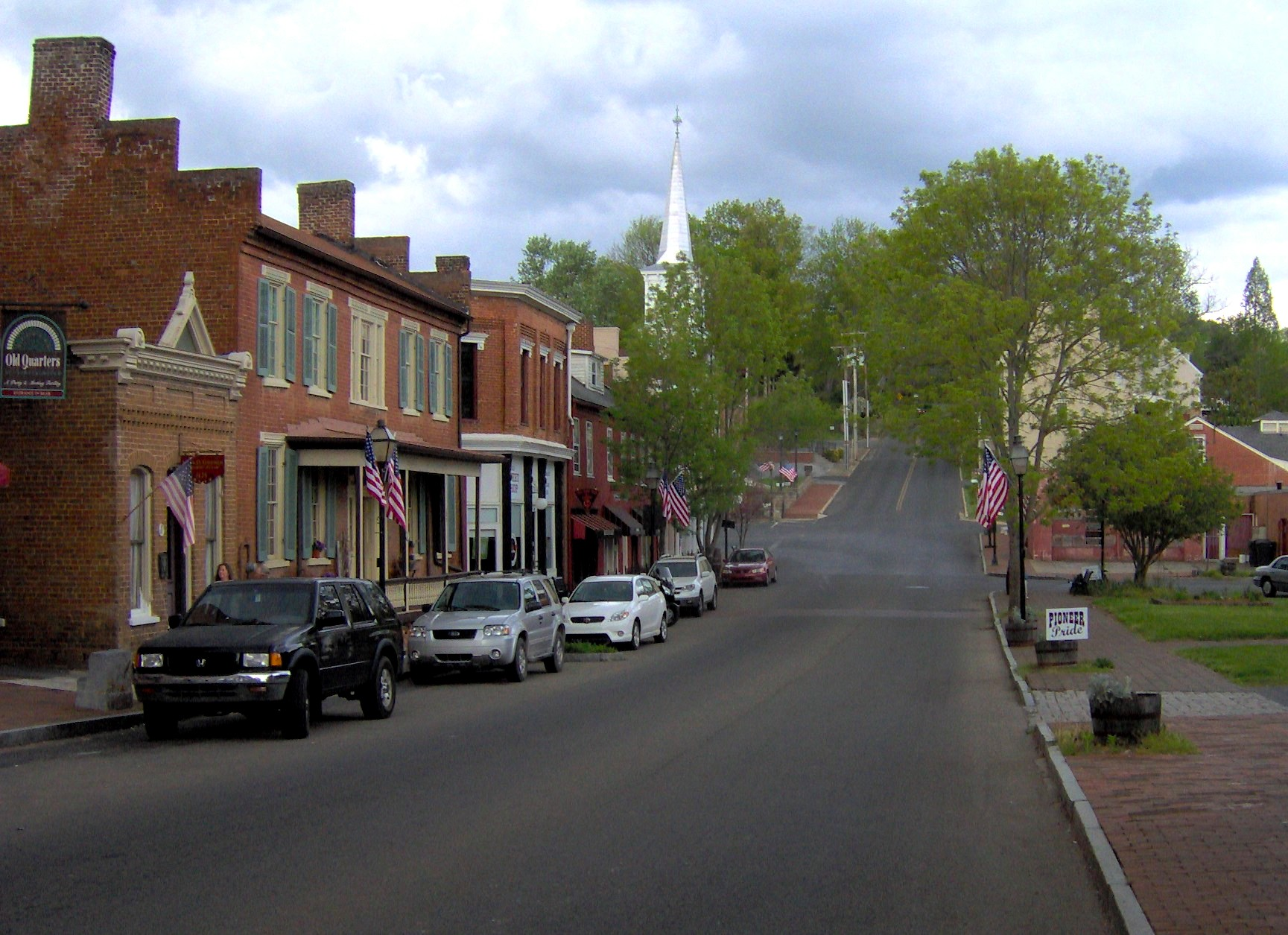
Main Street, part of the Jonesborough Historic District that is on the National Register of Historic Places

The town was renamed "Jonesboro" for a period of time, but it took back its historic spelling.

Jonesborough was originally a part of the Washington District. In 1784, it became the capital of the autonomous State of Franklin (ostensibly named after American founding father, Benjamin Franklin). Congress, however, never recognized Franklin, which was reclaimed by North Carolina in late 1788.

Tennessee and other border states into the 1830s were strong centers of abolitionist activity. The Tennessee Manumission Society was founded in 1815. East Tennessee was especially an area of Unionist leanings, made up of subsistence farmers who raised tobacco as a market crop. They had small holdings that also produced family needs. They held relatively few slaves compared to landowners in Middle Tennessee or the plantation areas of the Delta near the Mississippi River. Many became Republicans and continued to vote with that party after the war, when the other two regions of the state were dominated by Democrats.

Elihu Embree of Jonesborough founded the Manumission Intelligencier in 1819; he renamed it as The Emancipator the next year. The town was considered a center of abolitionism. The newspaper is the first American periodical to be dedicated exclusively to the issue of the abolition of slavery.

In the 1840s, the Jonesborough Whig was published here. Its publisher was William G. "Parson" Brownlow, who relocated it from Elizabethton, Tennessee, after about two years, under his own name. Brownlow and rival editor Landon Carter Haynes, who was also a Methodist preacher and circuit rider, brawled in the streets of Jonesborough in May 1840. Over the next several years, the two newspapermen bashed one another in their respective papers, each managing at times to thwart the other's political ambitions. Haynes left the newspaper business in 1845, and Brownlow, who later was elected as governor, moved the Whig to the larger city of Knoxville in 1849.

From 1865 to 1873 the town was served by The Union Flag. In this period, the Jonesboro Herald & Tribune, and the Jonesboro Tennessee Echo, the latter edited and published by Colonel George E. Gresham, were also published.

=== Cholera pandemic, 1873 ===
During the summer of 1873, a cholera epidemic spread throughout the Mississippi River system, having originated in New Orleans. Part of the fourth cholera pandemic that started in India and spread west into Europe and across the Atlantic Ocean, it was believed to have been introduced to the Louisiana port by immigrants or other travelers. It spread to river towns visited by steamboats, and among neighboring settlements. None of the towns had adequate sanitation systems.

With a mortality rate of 40 to 60% and no understanding of how the disease was contracted, people dreaded an outbreak. (It was variously attributed to poor diet and miasma.) While residents of Jonesborough heard about cases in Knoxville and Greeneville, which was about 24 miles away and hard hit, their first case was not seen until July 14. Mrs. A. C. Collins died after caring for two refugees from Greeneville, who recovered. The Herald & Tribune had already published a warning about cholera, and many people had left the town for what they thought were healthier locations. The newspaper did not publish again for weeks, as cholera spread rapidly in town.

Of the estimated 75 people left, 30 died by early August and another 30 contracted the disease but survived. Victims included publisher Col. George Gresham, who had devoted himself to caring for victims, and G.C. Thrasher, one of four ministers who also remained in the town during the crisis. The town received help and monies from other localities, and within a month, the disease had mostly run its course. Residents began to return to the depleted town, shaken by the disastrous month.

=== Modern tourism ===
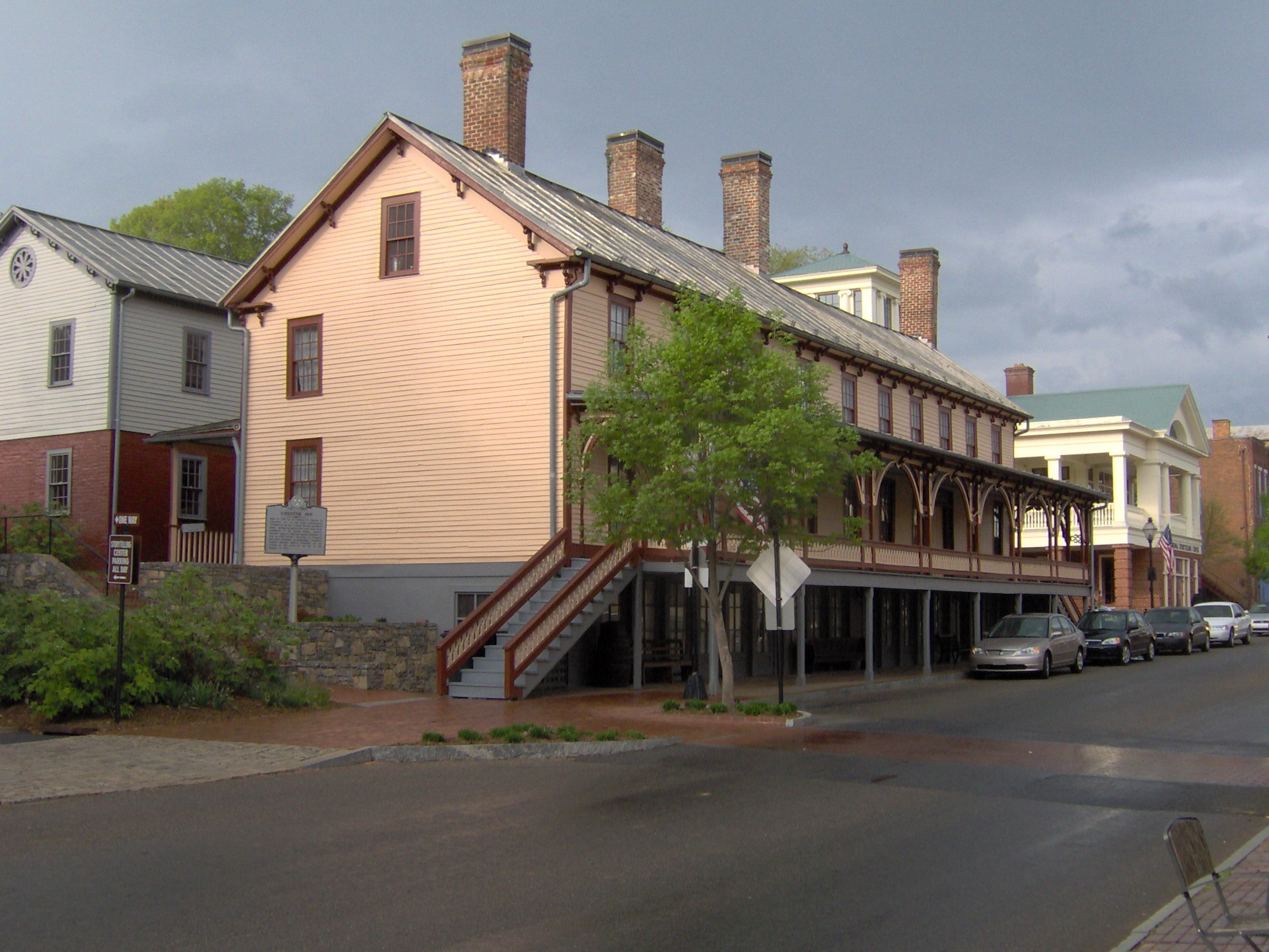
The Chester Inn, built in 1797, still stands in downtown Jonesborough.

Today, Jonesborough attracts heritage tourism because of its status as Tennessee's oldest town and its rich architectural fabric, protected by local historic preservation efforts. The town's museum describes the local heritage of small-scale tobacco farming. The historic Chester Inn, built in 1797, still stands in downtown Jonesborough.

The Jonesborough Historic District was listed on the National Register of Historic Places in 1969. The oldest surviving building in the town, the Christopher Taylor House (built in 1777 about a mile outside of the original town limits), was relocated to a lot within the historic district.

Jonesborough is the home of the International Storytelling Center, which holds the annual National Storytelling Festival on the first full weekend in October. The festival builds on the Appalachian cultural tradition of storytelling, and has been drawing people from around the world for more than 35 years. Large tents are pitched in parks around town, and storytellers sit on stages or at the head of the main tent to perform. Occasionally, performances are interrupted for a moment by passing Norfolk Southern Railway trains. Past storytellers included Carmen Agra Deedy, Syd Lieberman, and Kathryn Tucker Windham. The festival inspired the development of a successful storytelling graduate degree program at nearby East Tennessee State University.

== Geography ==
Jonesborough is situated in an area where the watershed of the Watauga River meets the watershed of the Nolichucky River. The Watauga passes about 10 miles (16 km) to the northeast of Jonesborough, and the Nolichucky passes roughly 10 miles (16 km) to the southwest. The town's principal stream, Little Limestone Creek, is part of the Nolichucky watershed.

Jonesborough is surrounded by low hills and elongated ridges that are characteristic of the Appalachian Ridge-and-Valley Province. The main crest of the Appalachians rises just a few miles southeast of Jonesborough.

Jonesborough is centered on the junction of Andrew Johnson Highway (which is part of both U.S. Route 321 and U.S. Route 11E), which connects the town to Greeneville to the southwest and Johnson City to the northeast, and State Route 81, which connects Jonesborough to Interstate 81 to the northwest and Interstate 26 at Erwin to the southeast.

According to the United States Census Bureau, the town has a total area of 4.3 sq mi (11 km^{2}), all of it land.

== Demographics ==
Historical population
| Census | Pop. | Note | %± |
|---|---|---|---|
| 1880 | 895 | | — |
| 1890 | 937 | | 4.7% |
| 1900 | 854 | | −8.9% |
| 1910 | 806 | | −5.6% |
| 1920 | 815 | | 1.1% |
| 1930 | 931 | | 14.2% |
| 1940 | 976 | | 4.8% |
| 1950 | 1,126 | | 15.4% |
| 1960 | 1,148 | | 2.0% |
| 1970 | 1,510 | | 31.5% |
| 1980 | 2,829 | | 87.4% |
| 1990 | 3,091 | | 9.3% |
| 2000 | 4,168 | | 34.8% |
| 2010 | 5,051 | | 21.2% |
| 2020 | 5,860 | | 16.0% |
| 2024 (est.) | 6,746 | ▲ | 15.1% |

=== 2020 census ===
Jonesborough racial composition
| Race | Number | Percentage |
|---|---|---|
| White (non-Hispanic) | 5,151 | 87.9% |
| Black or African American (non-Hispanic) | 259 | 4.42% |
| Native American | 10 | 0.17% |
| Asian | 57 | 0.97% |
| Pacific Islander | 3 | 0.05% |
| Other/Mixed | 216 | 3.69% |
| Hispanic or Latino | 164 | 2.8% |

As of the 2020 United States census, there were 5,860 people, 2,064 households, and 1,397 families residing in the town.

=== 2000 census ===
As of the census of 2000, 4,168 people, 1,660 households, and 1,107 families were residing in the town. The population density was 963.2 people/sq mi (371.7/km^{2}). The 1,771 housing units averaged 409.3/sq mi (157.9/km^{2}). The racial makeup of the town was 93.43% White, 5.54% African American, 0.10% Native American, 0.17% Asian, 0.19% from other races, and 0.58% from two or more races. Hispanics or Latinos of any race were 0.82% of the population.

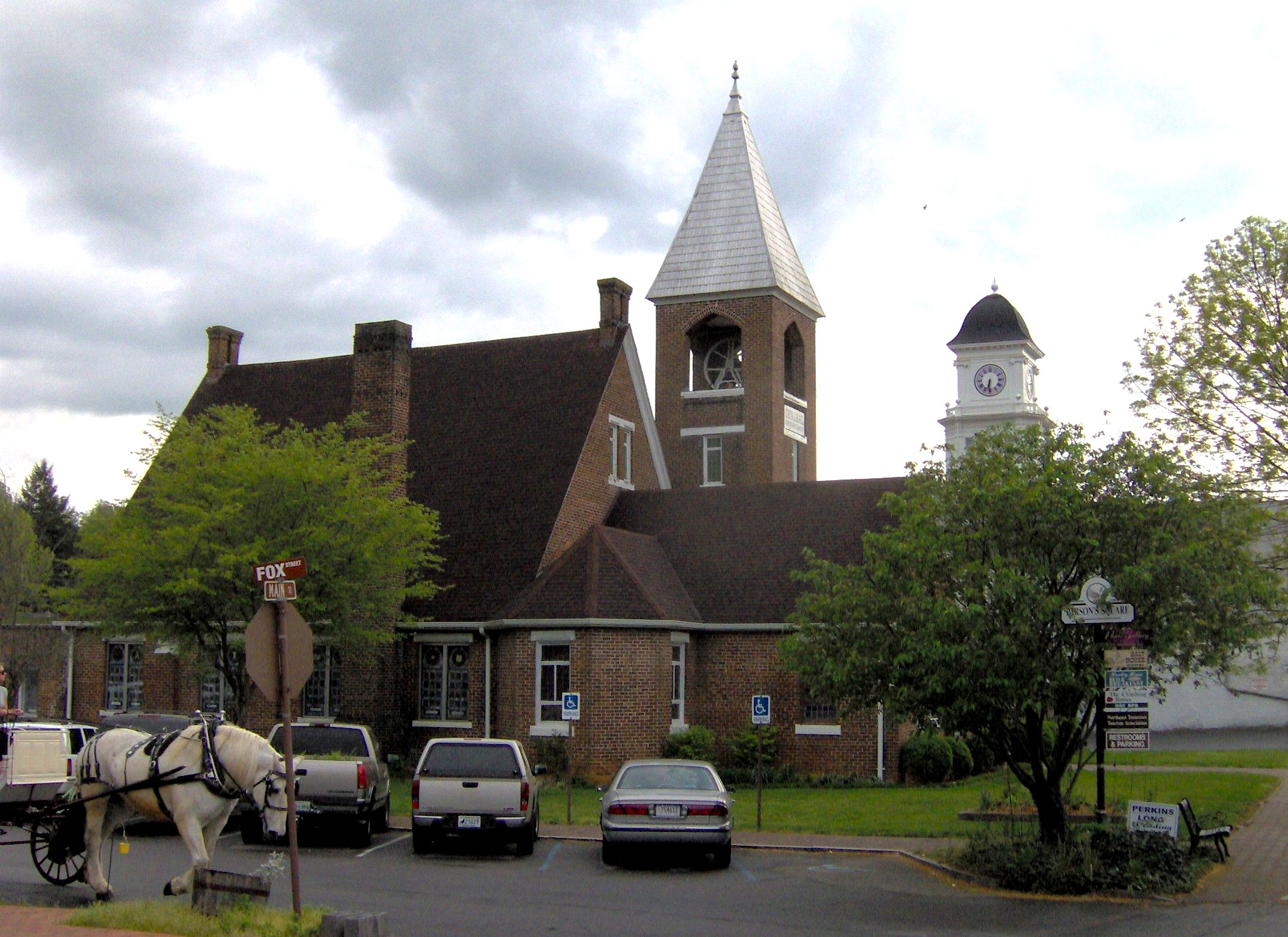
Central Christian Church

Of the 1,660 households, 27.1% had children under 18 living with them, 52.3% were married couples living together, 11.3% had a female householder with no husband present, and 33.3% were not families. About 30.1% of all households were made up of individuals, and 13.3% had someone living alone who was 65 years of age or older. The average household size was 2.26, and the average family size was 2.80.

In the town, the age distribution was 19.5% under 18, 8.7% from 18 to 24, 29.9% from 25 to 44, 25.6% from 45 to 64, and 16.4% who were 65 or older. The median age was 39 years. For every 100 females, there were 101.5 males. For every 100 females age 18 and over, there were 98.6 males.

The median income for a household in the town was $32,132, and for a family was $44,167. Males had a median income of $28,906 versus $26,192 for females. The per capita income for the town was $18,768. About 11.0% of families and 16.0% of the population were below the poverty line, including 25.7% of those under age 18 and 22.5% of those age 65 or over.

== Education ==
Jonesborough is within the Washington County School District, which has nine elementary schools, two middle schools, and three high schools.

Schools located in Jonesborough include:

- Jonesborough Elementary School
- David Crockett High School

== Recreation ==
The southern Appalachian Mountains are home to numerous outdoor activities, such as hiking/backpacking, cycling (road and mountain), hunting, fishing (streams, rivers, and lakes), whitewater rafting/kayaking, golf, disc golf, ATV/motocross, rock climbing, zip lining/canopy tours, and caving.

The Jonesborough Repertory Theatre produces community theater and hosts educational workshops for aspiring actors.

== Local legend ==
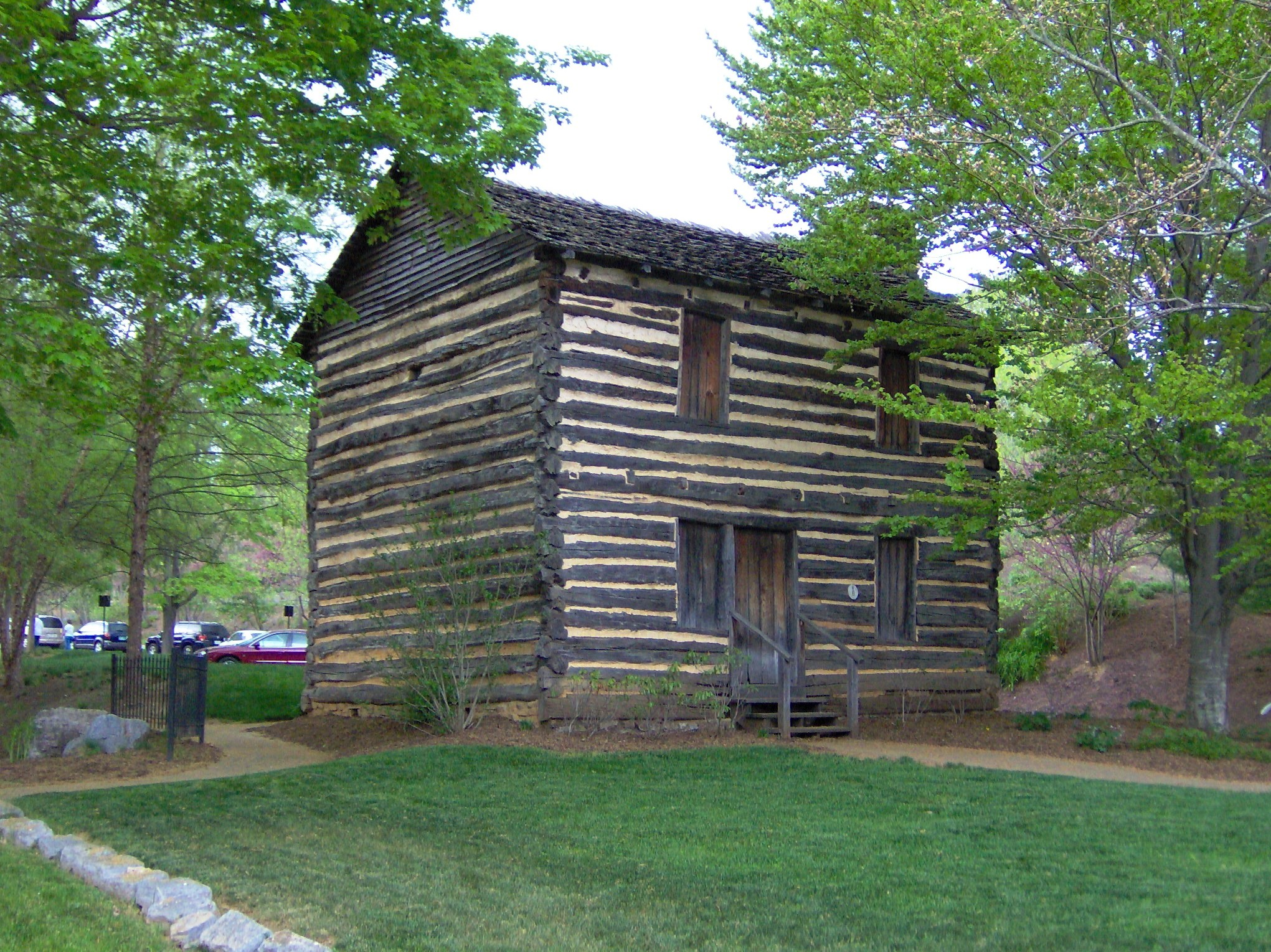
The Christopher Taylor House, built c. 1777

A local legend holds that the ghost of Andrew Jackson occasionally appears in the vicinity of the Christopher Taylor House, a historic log cabin now in a town park. In 1788, the future U.S. president spent several months practicing law in Jonesborough while awaiting a caravan to modern-day Nashville. During this time, he lodged in a cabin belonging to Major Christopher Taylor, which was located about a mile outside of town. In 1974, this cabin was removed from its original spot and reconstructed in the town's park, within the city's historic district.

== Notable people ==
- Walter P. Brownlow, U.S. congressman
- Cornelia Deaderick Glenn, First Lady of North Carolina
- James W. Deaderick, Chief Justice of the Tennessee Supreme Court (1876–1886)
- Alfred Eugene Jackson, farmer and merchant, and a founder of the East Tennessee and Virginia Railroad. Jackson served in the Confederate army during the Civil War, and was the only General on either side from Washington County. During the nearby battle at Limestone, Tennessee, his troops captured approximately 300 soldiers from the 100th Ohio Infantry (US), along with their Enfield rifles and ammunition. The local chapter of the Sons of Confederate Veterans is named after General Jackson.
- Thomas H. McCray, Confederate Army officer was born here.
- Bernie Moore, College Football Hall of Fame coach was born here.
- Thomas Amos Rogers Nelson, Congressman and Southern Unionist
- G.C. Spencer, former NASCAR driver
- David Curtiss Stephenson, Ku Klux Klan Grand Dragon of the Indiana Klan; convicted in Noblesville, Indiana of the 1925 second-degree murder and rape of Madge Oberholtzer; died June 28, 1966 (age 74) in Jonesborough

== Gallery ==
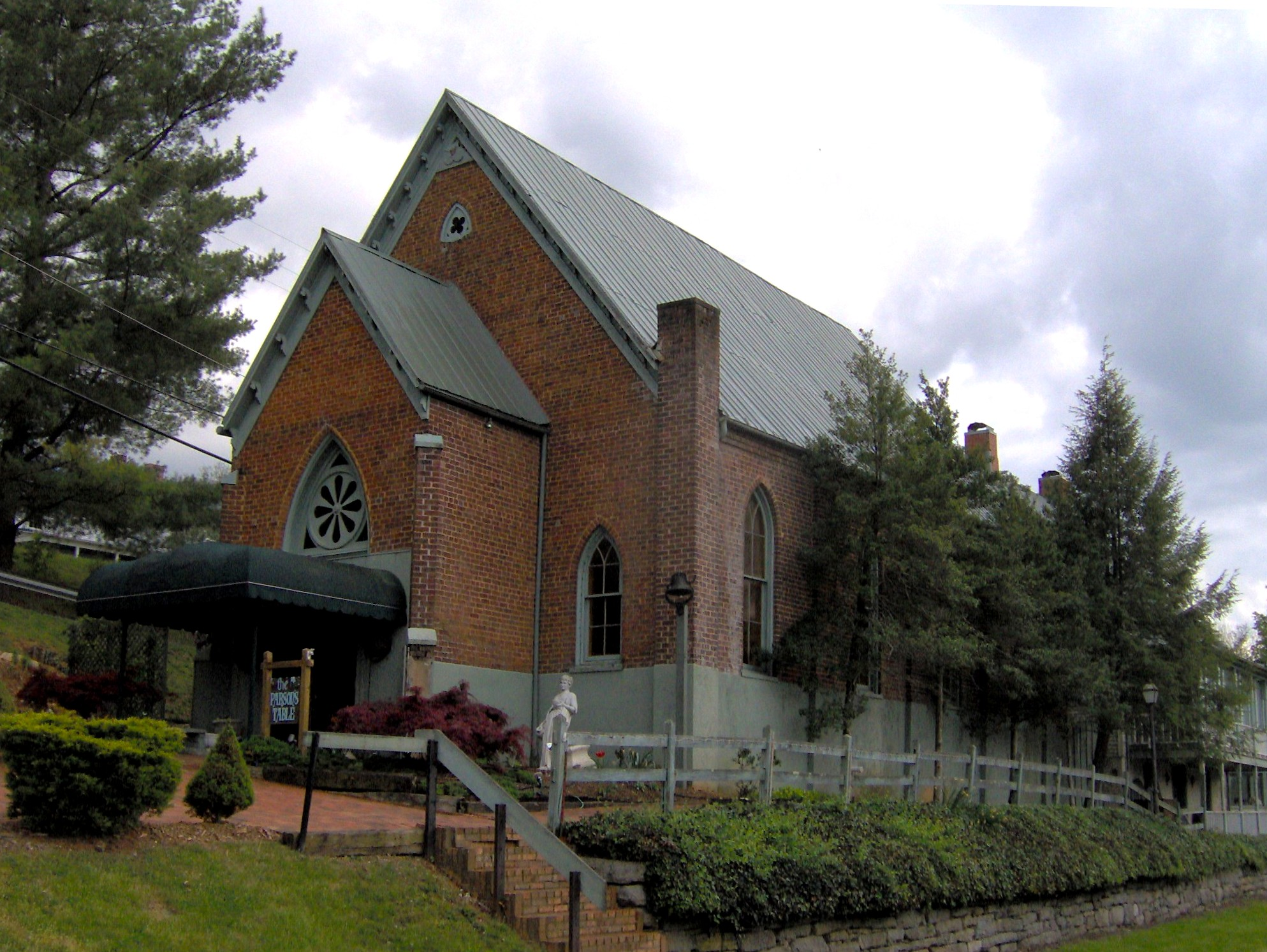
Parson's table, built 1874

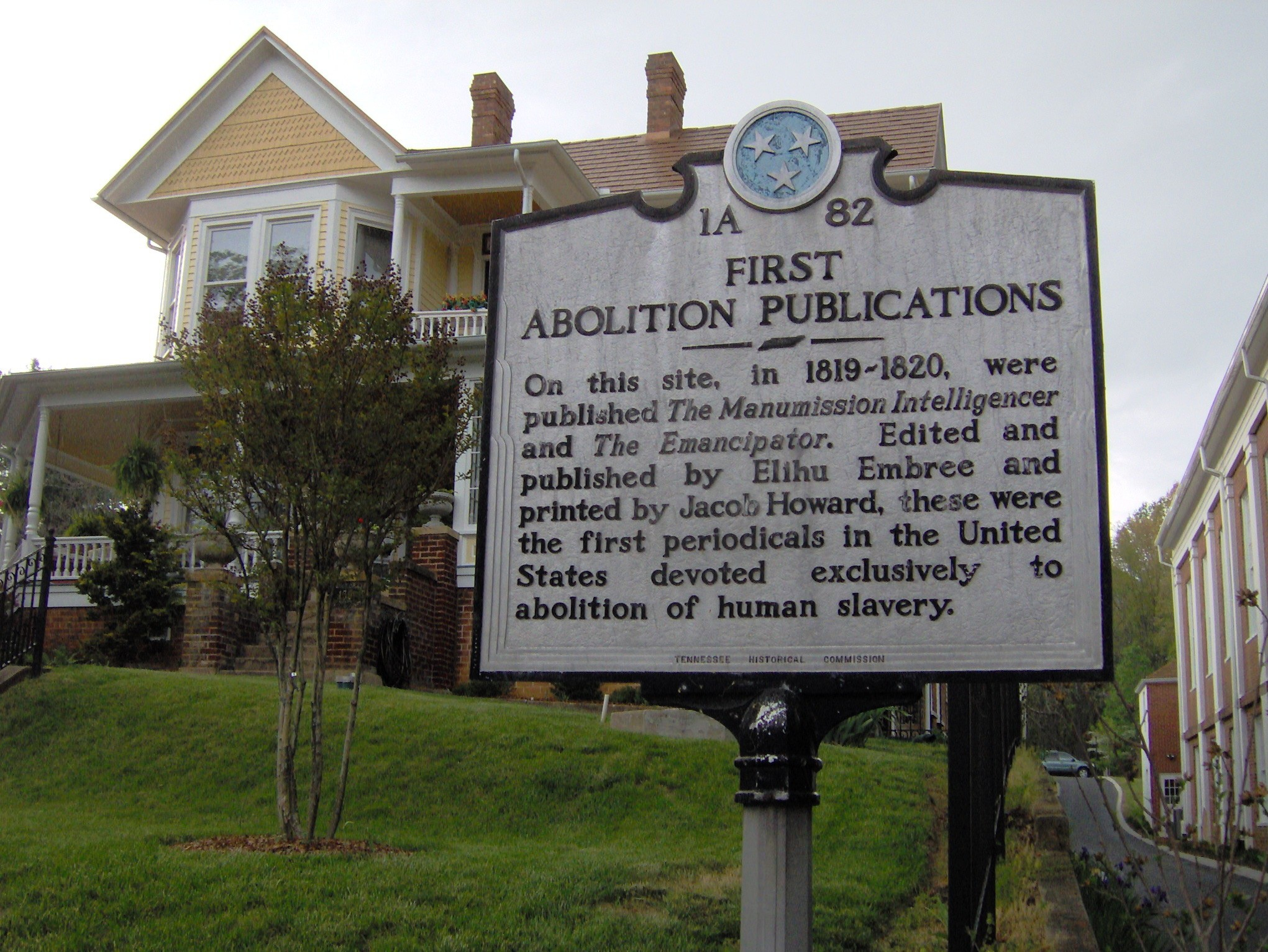
THC marker recalling abolitionist publications

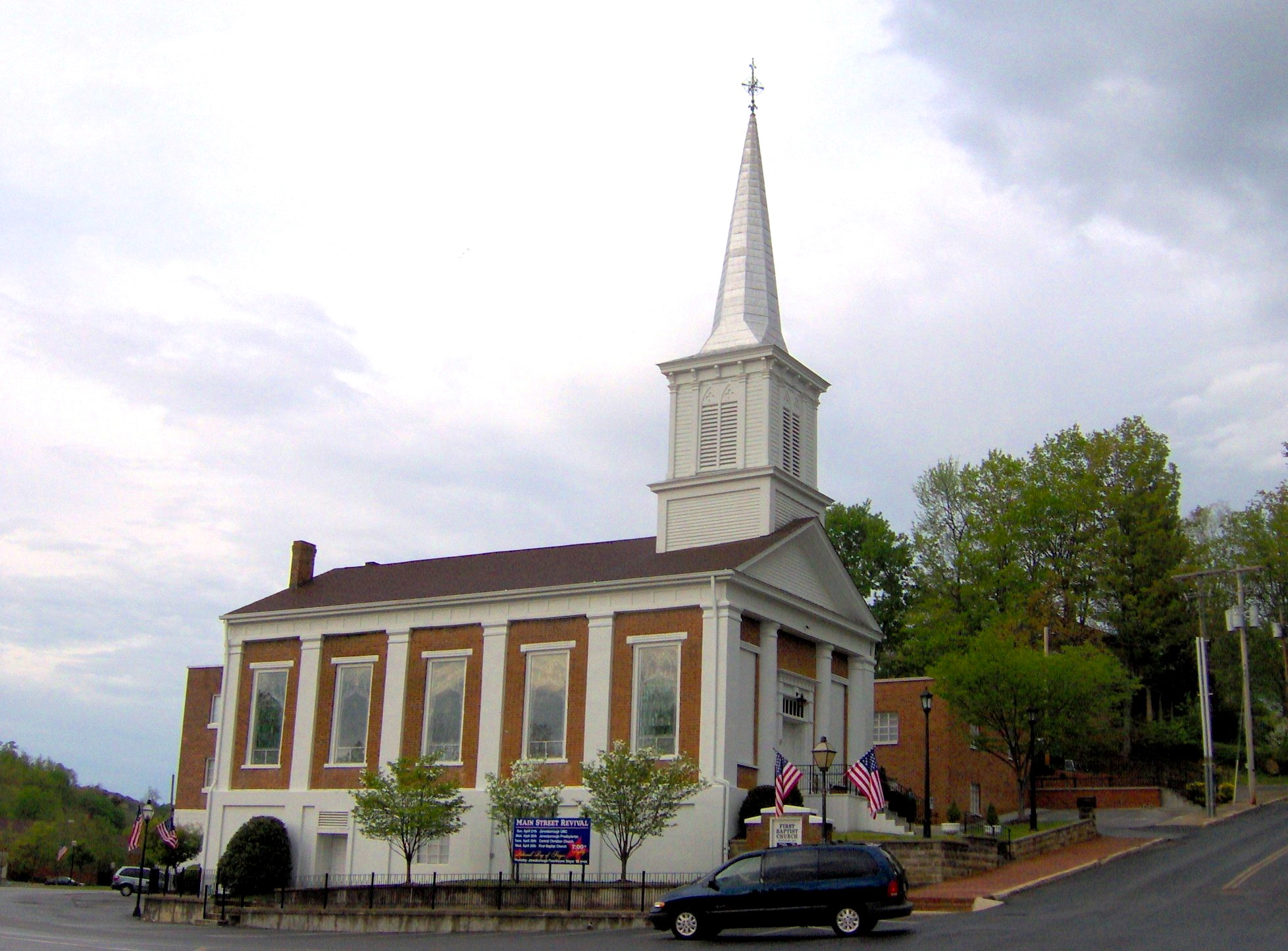
First Baptist Church, built 1852

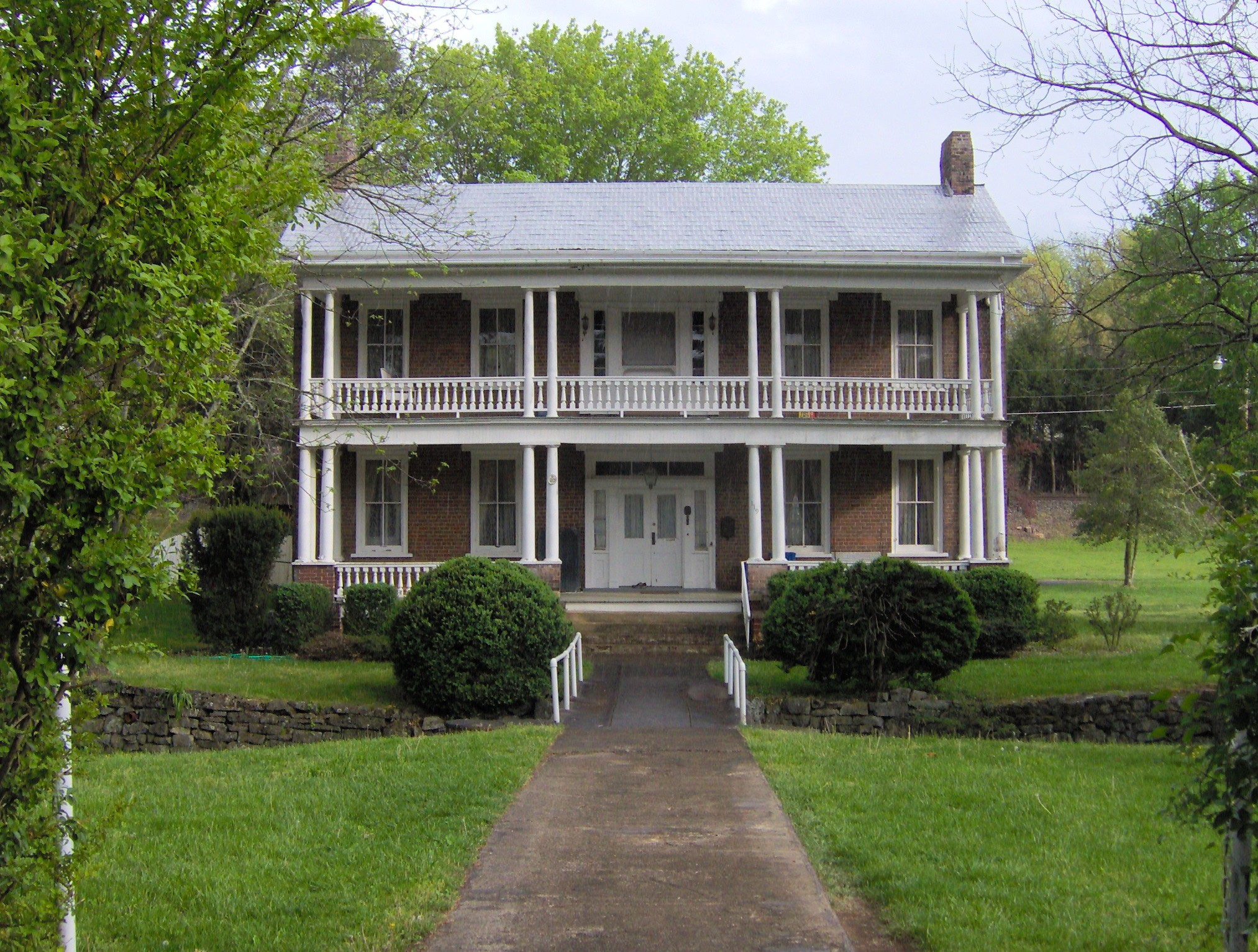
Cunningham-Clayton House, built circa 1840

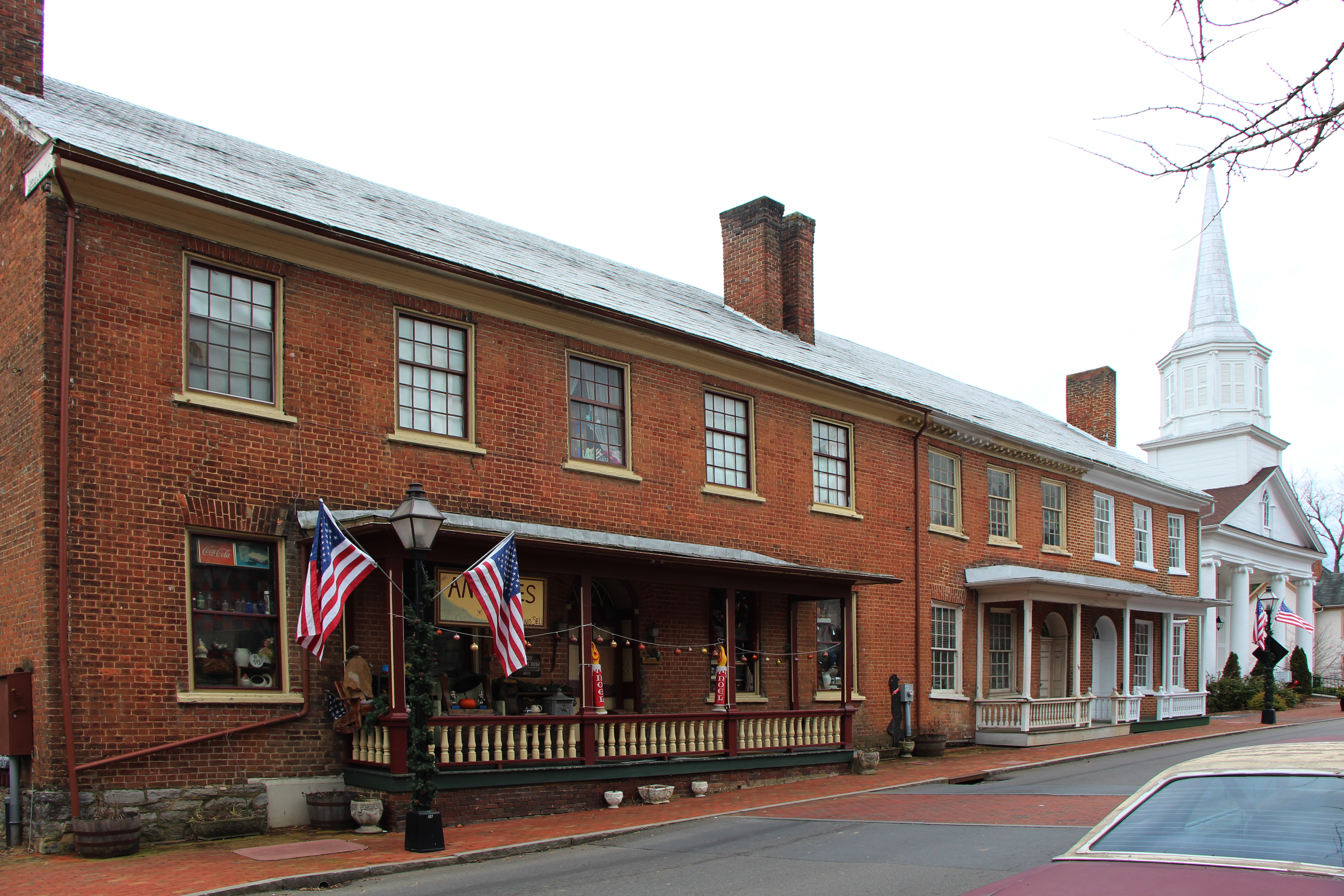
Sister's Row, looking west, 205-209 W. Main Street, built 1821

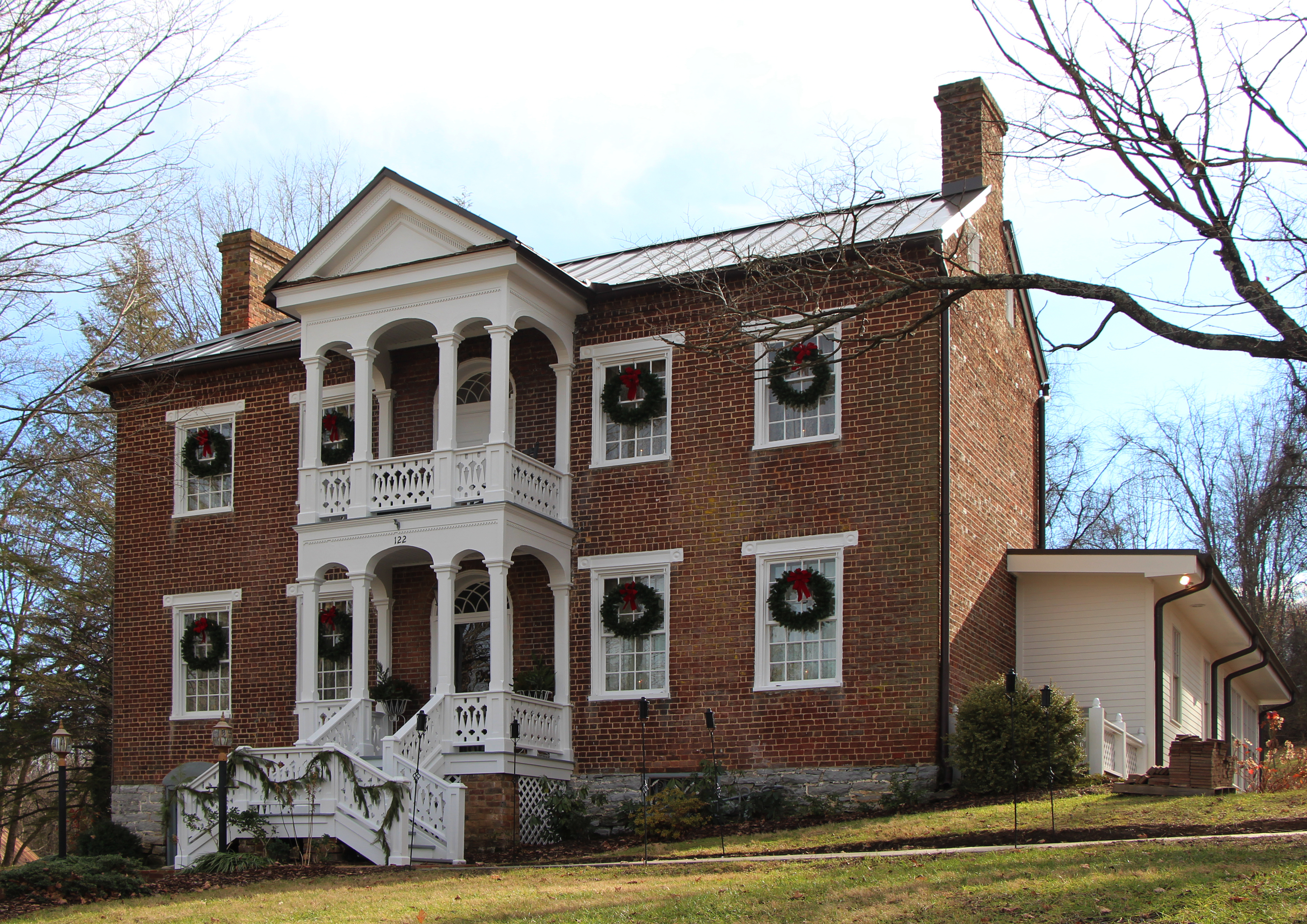
122 E. Woodrow Ave., built c. 1815

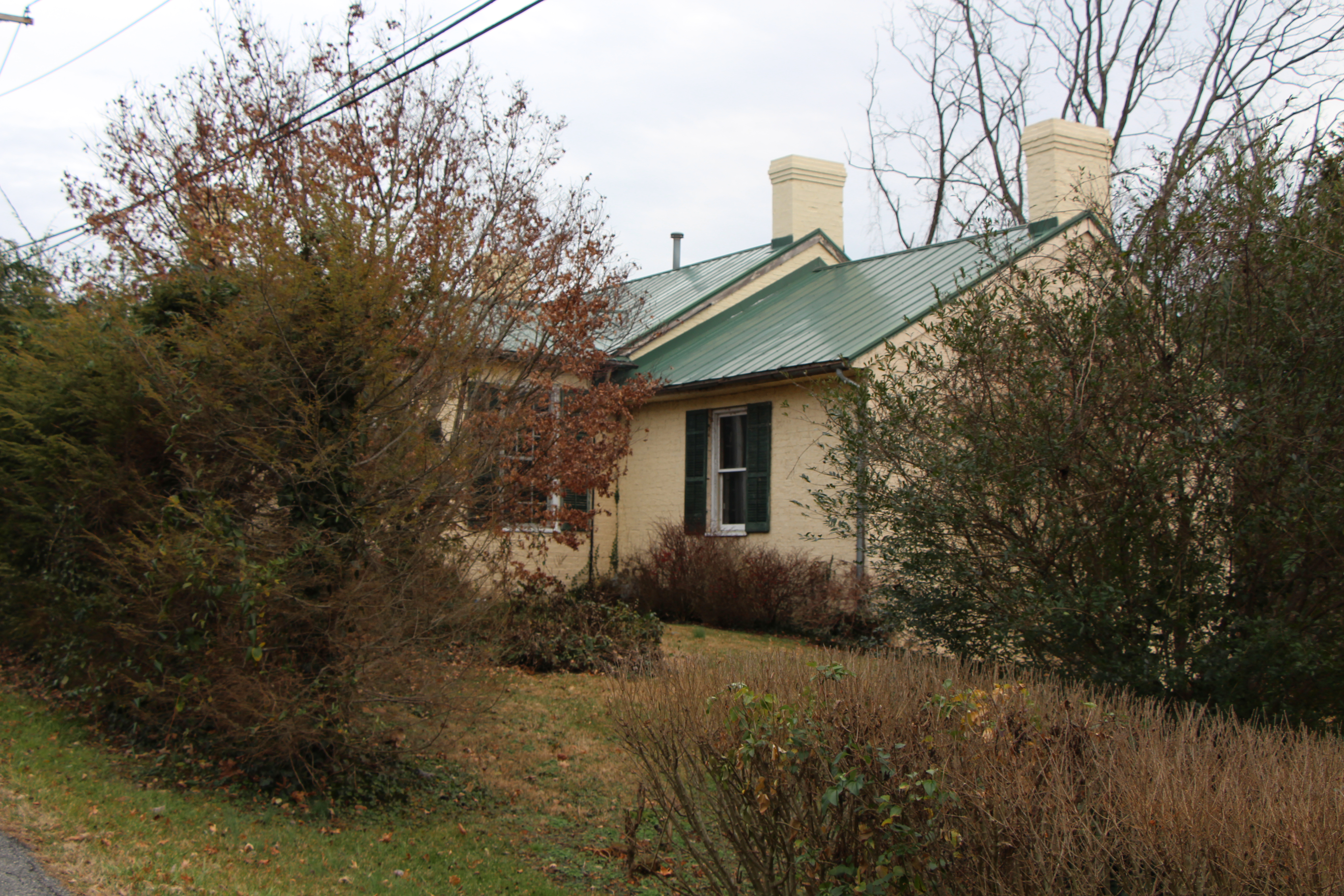
Old Jonesborough Female Academy, 205 W. College Street, built circa 1834

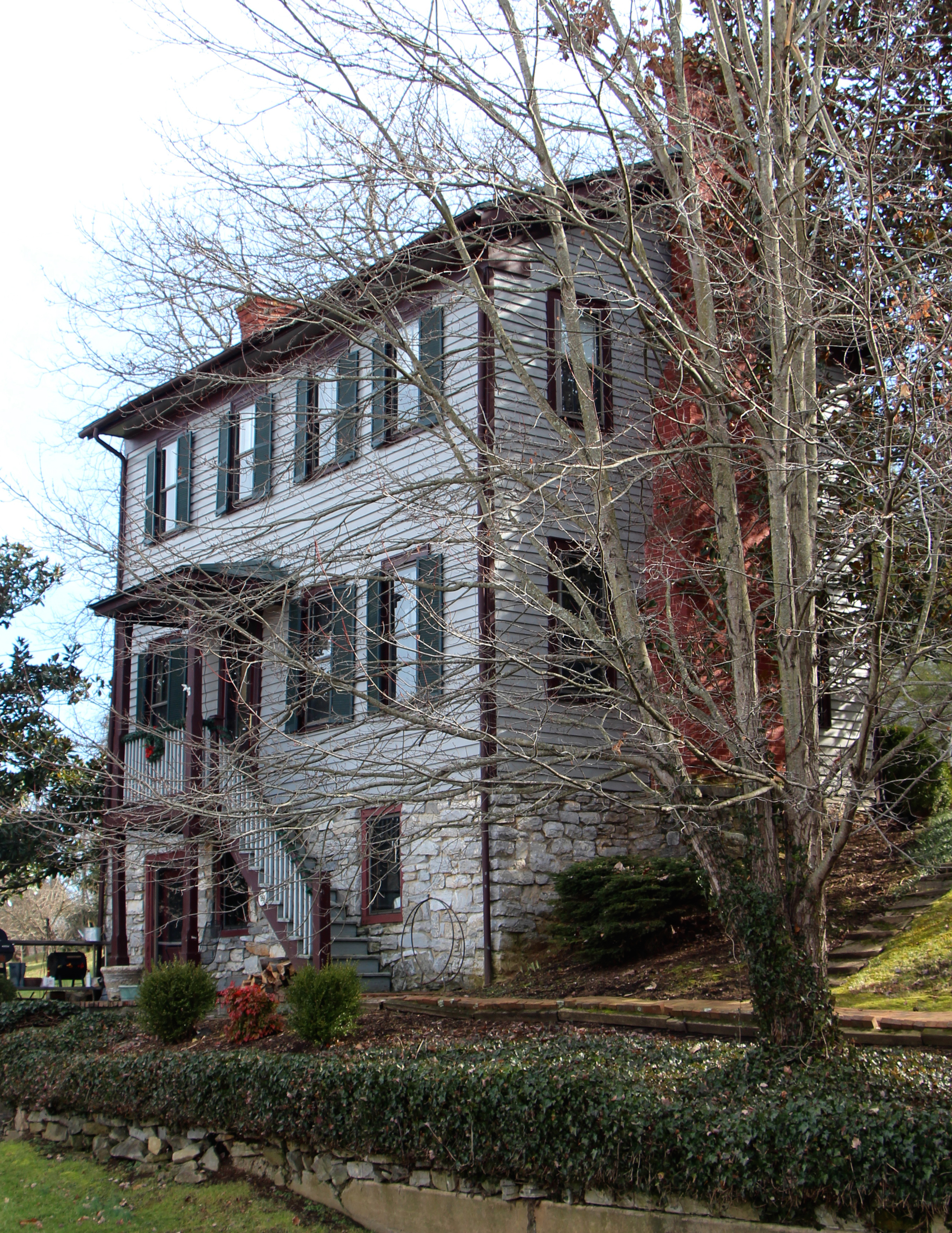
Jacobs House, 106 E. Woodrow Avenue, built circa 1831

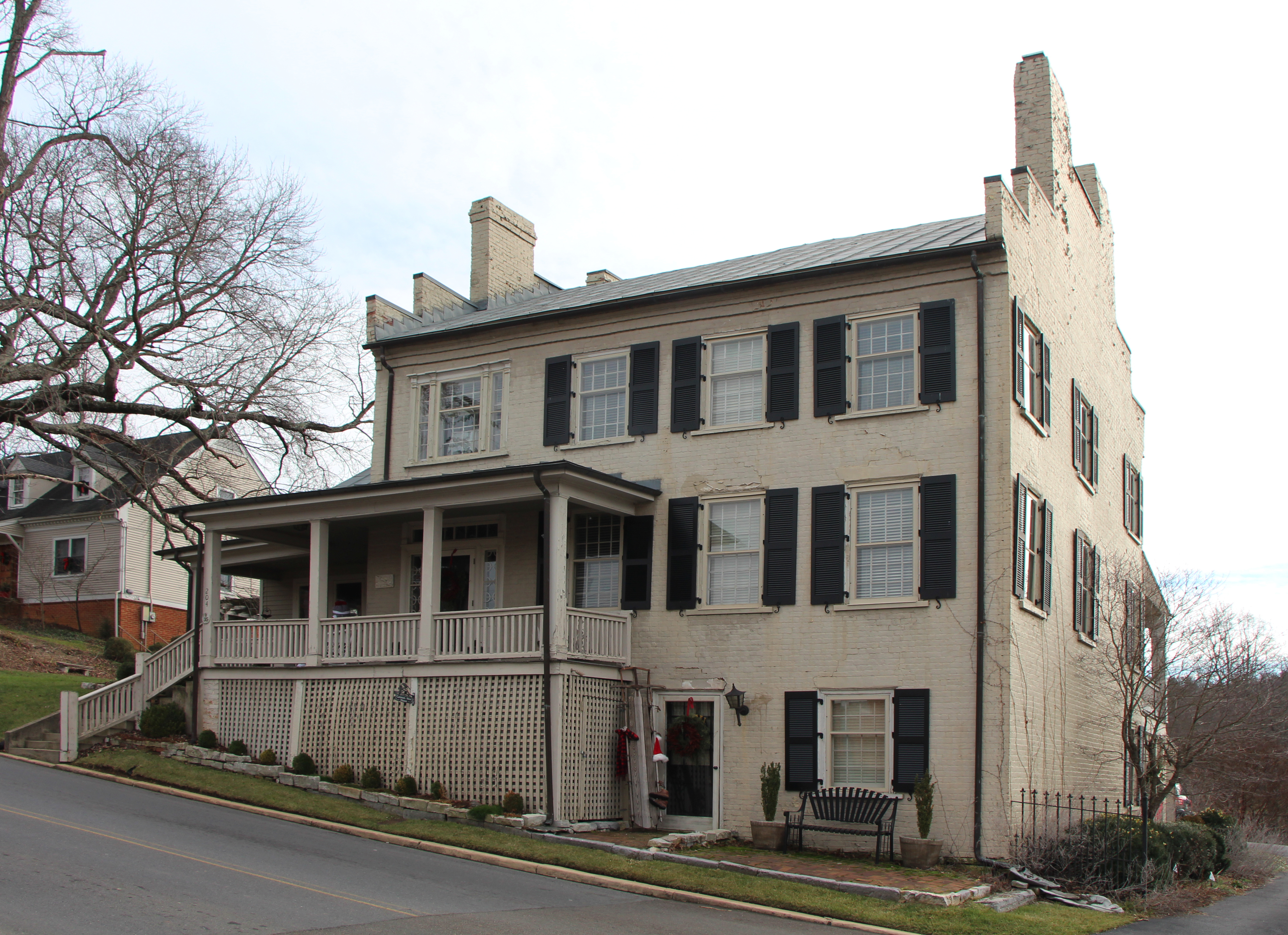
Gamon-Hoss House, 204 E. Main Street, built circa 1830; Federal style with Greek Revival influences

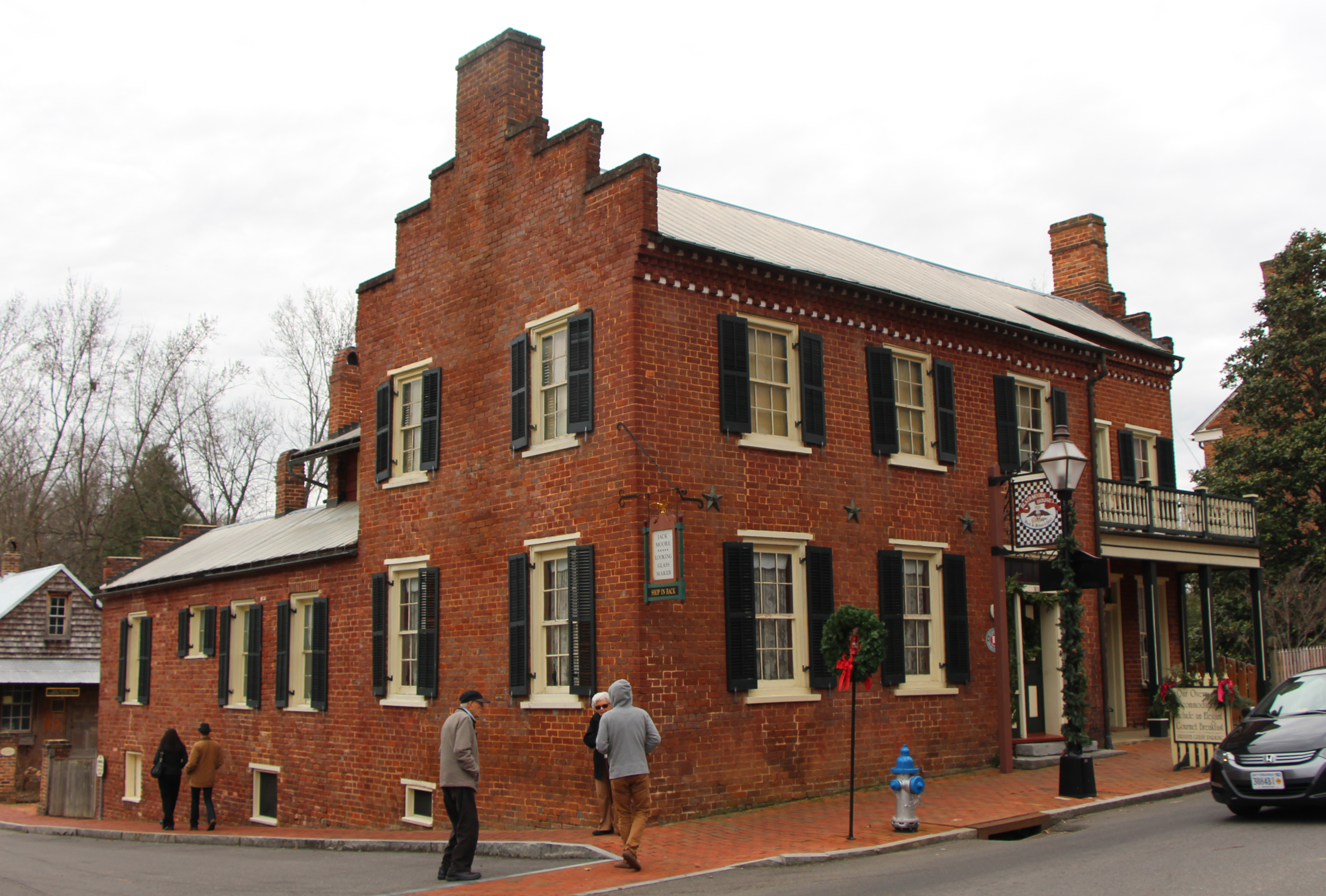
Blair-Moore House, 201 W. Main Street, built circa 1830; Federal style with Greek Revival influences

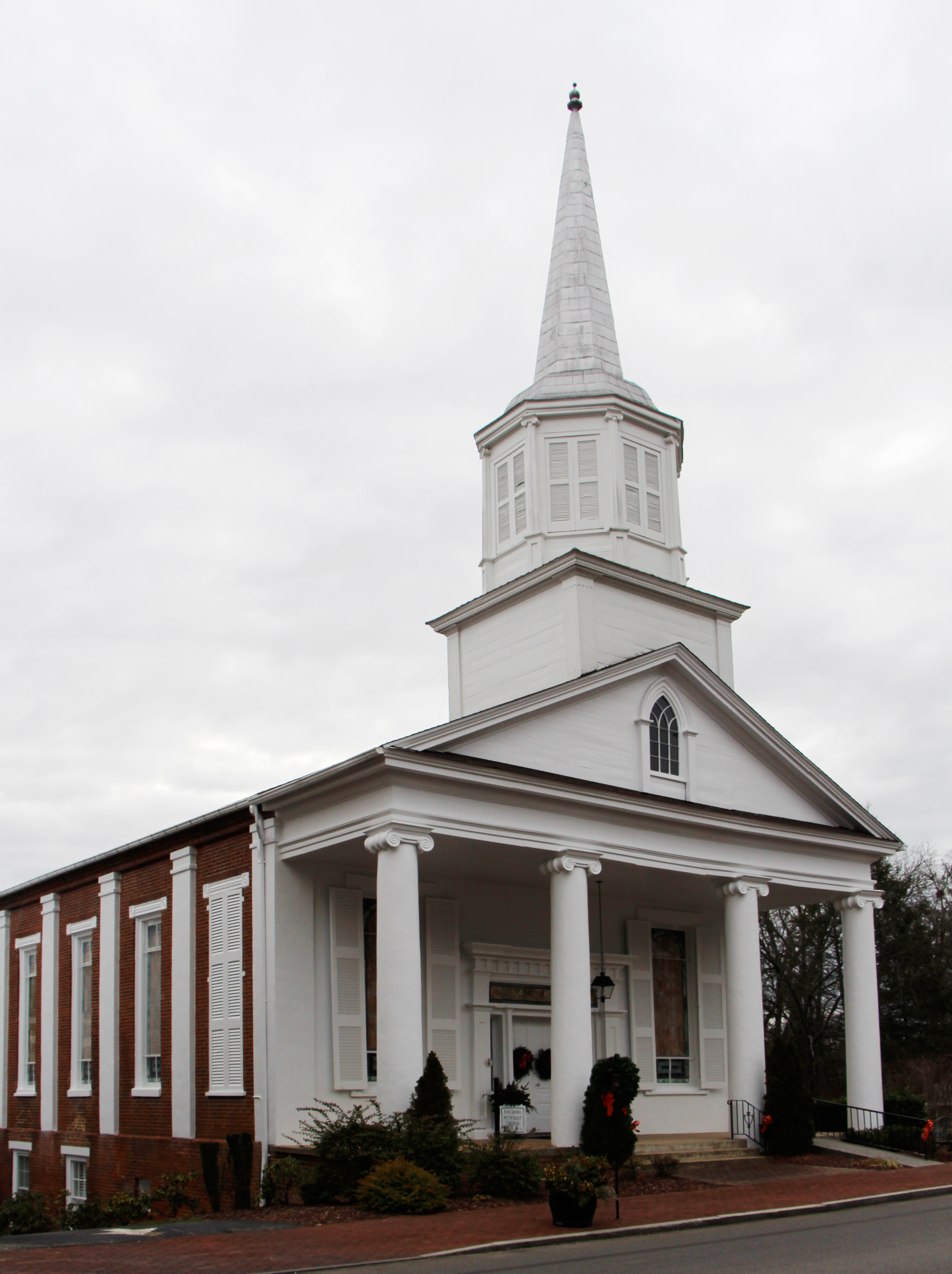
Methodist Church, 211 W. Main Street, circa 1845

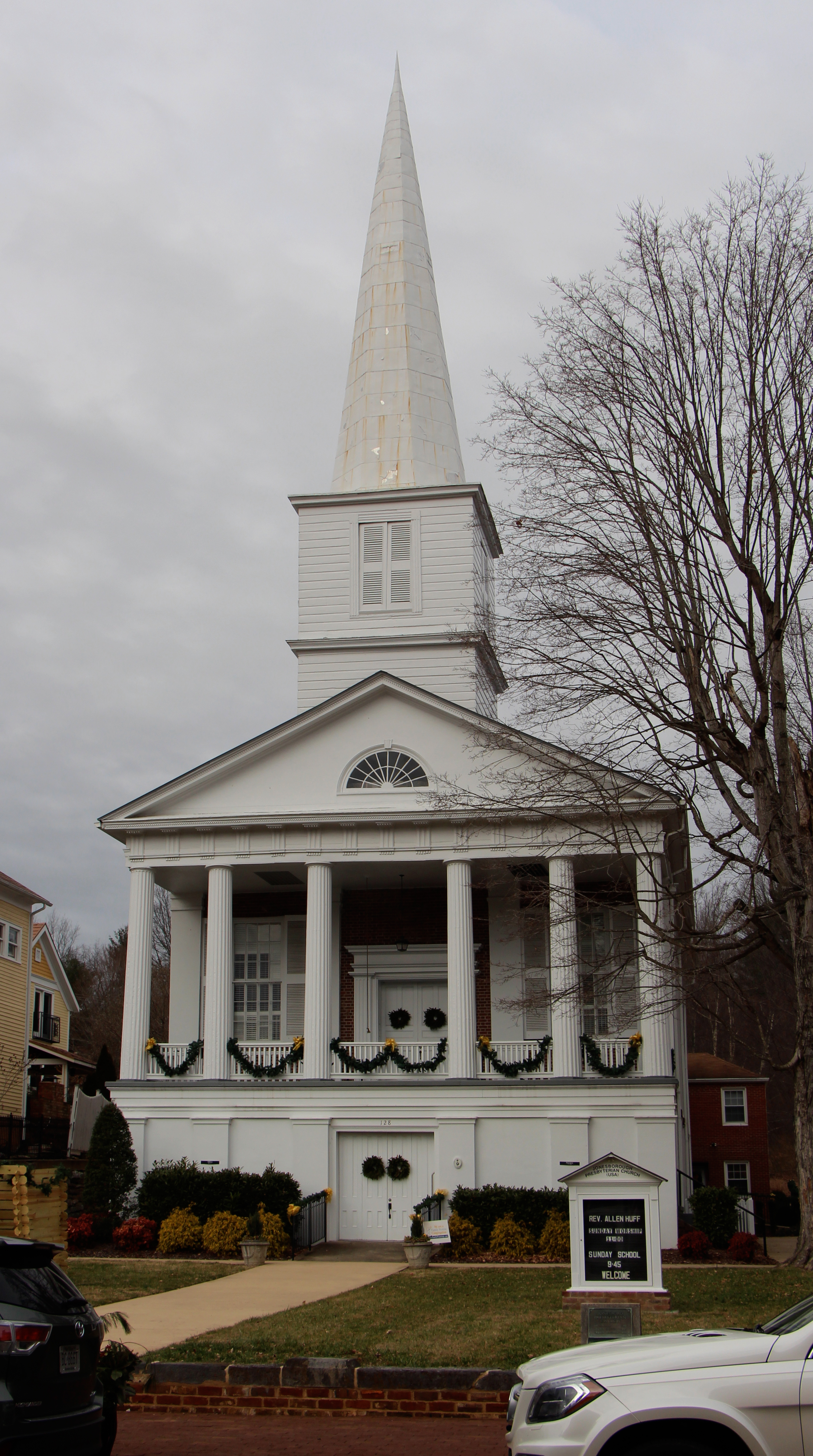
Presbyterian Church, 126 W. Main Street, circa 1845

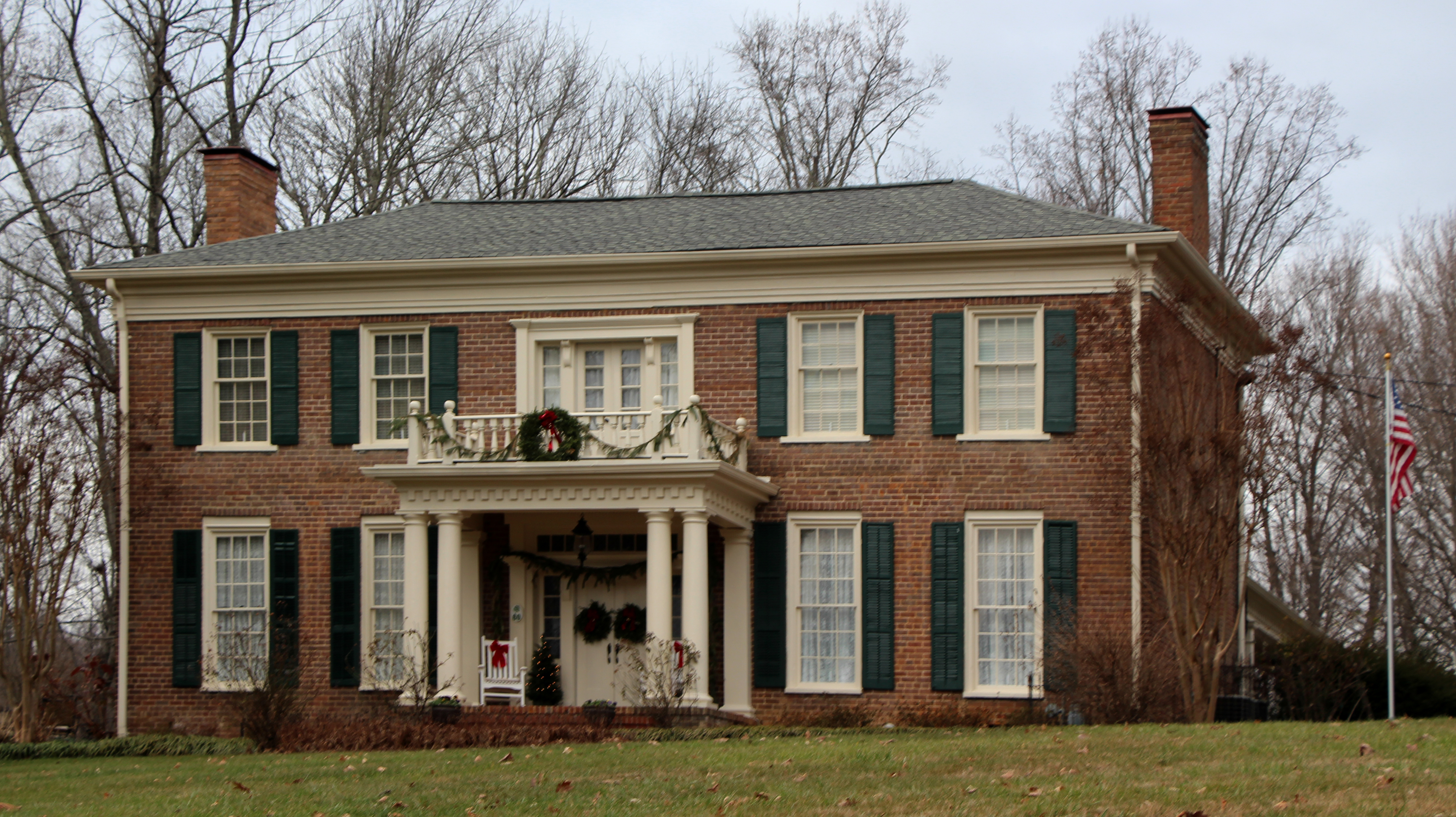
Febuary Hill, 102 W. College Street, c. 1840

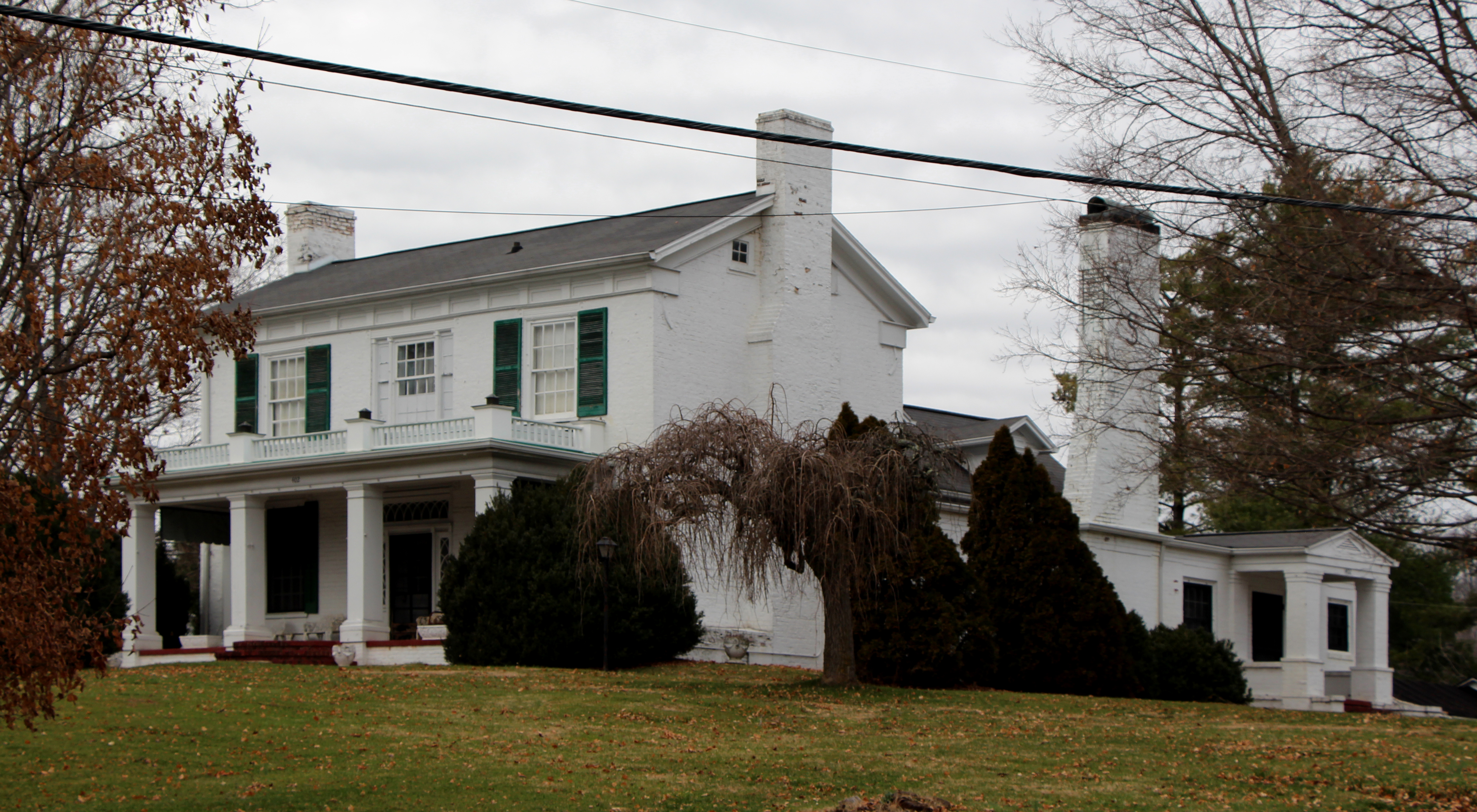
Walter Sherfey Home, 402 W. College Street, circa 1850

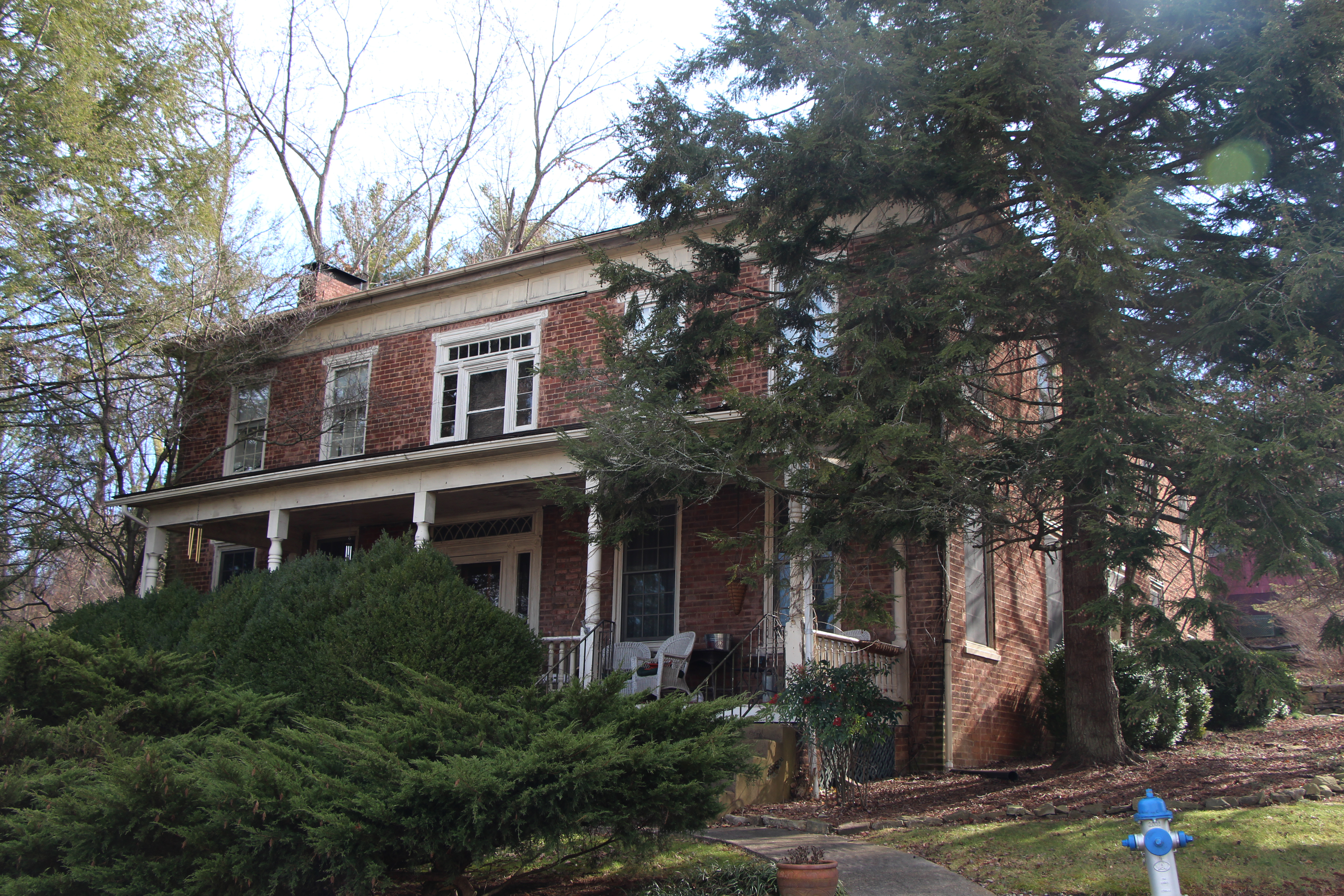
Shipley House, 100 E. Woodrow Avenue, circa 1848

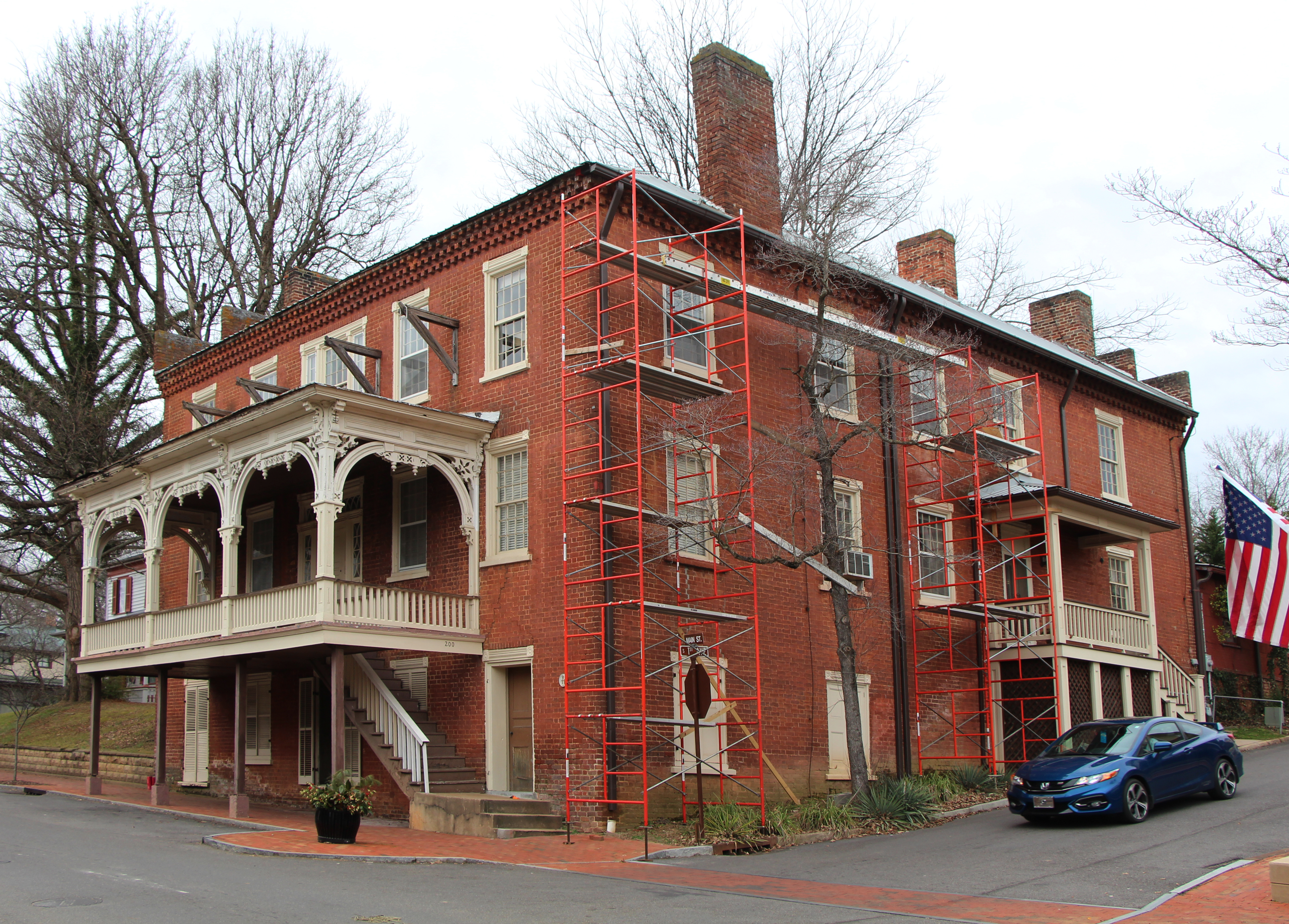
Mansion House/May Residence, looking west, 200 W. Main Street, built 1849 with Federal influence

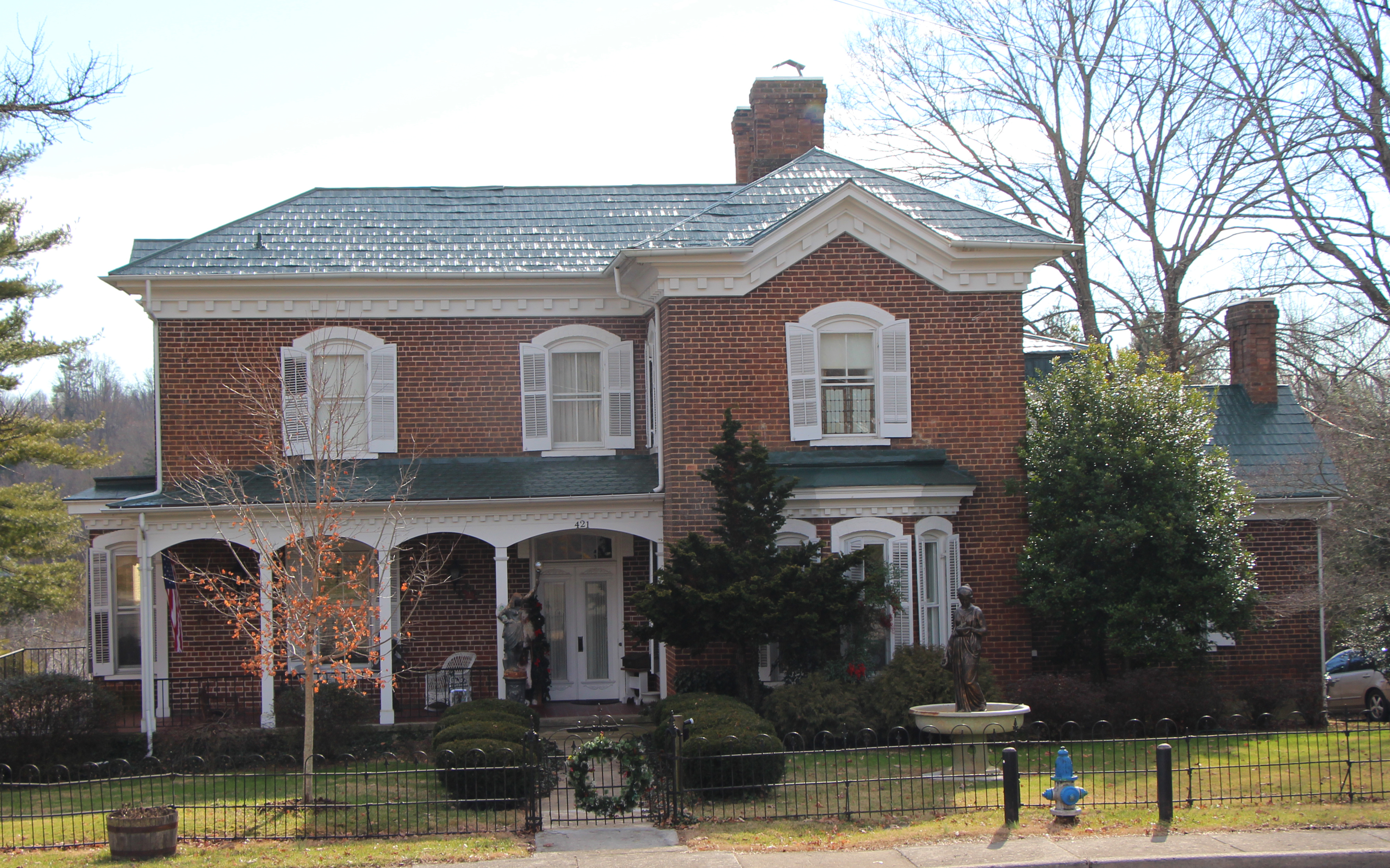
Johnson or Range House, 421 W. Main Street, built 1880

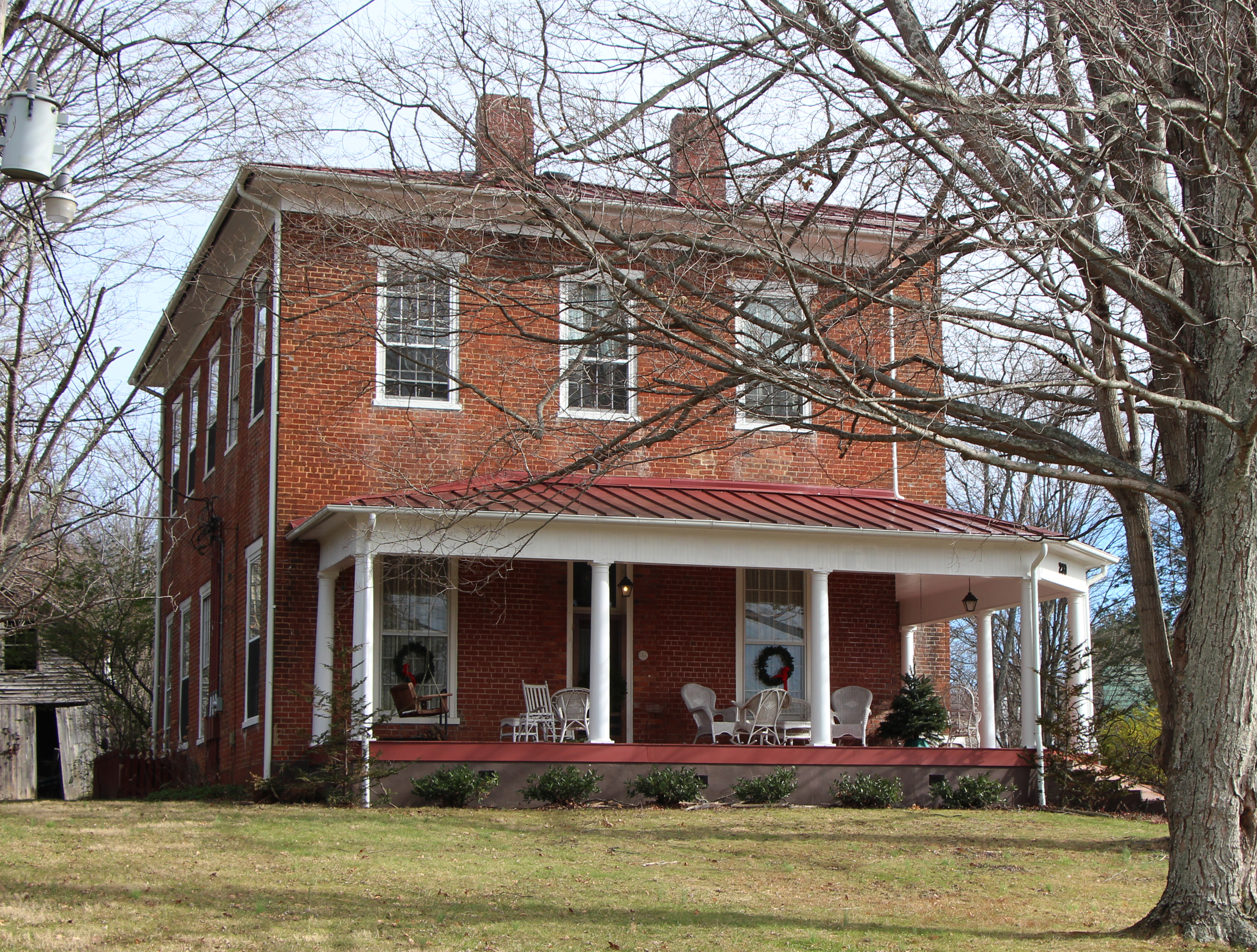
Holston Baptist Female Institute, 233 E. Main Street, circa 1855

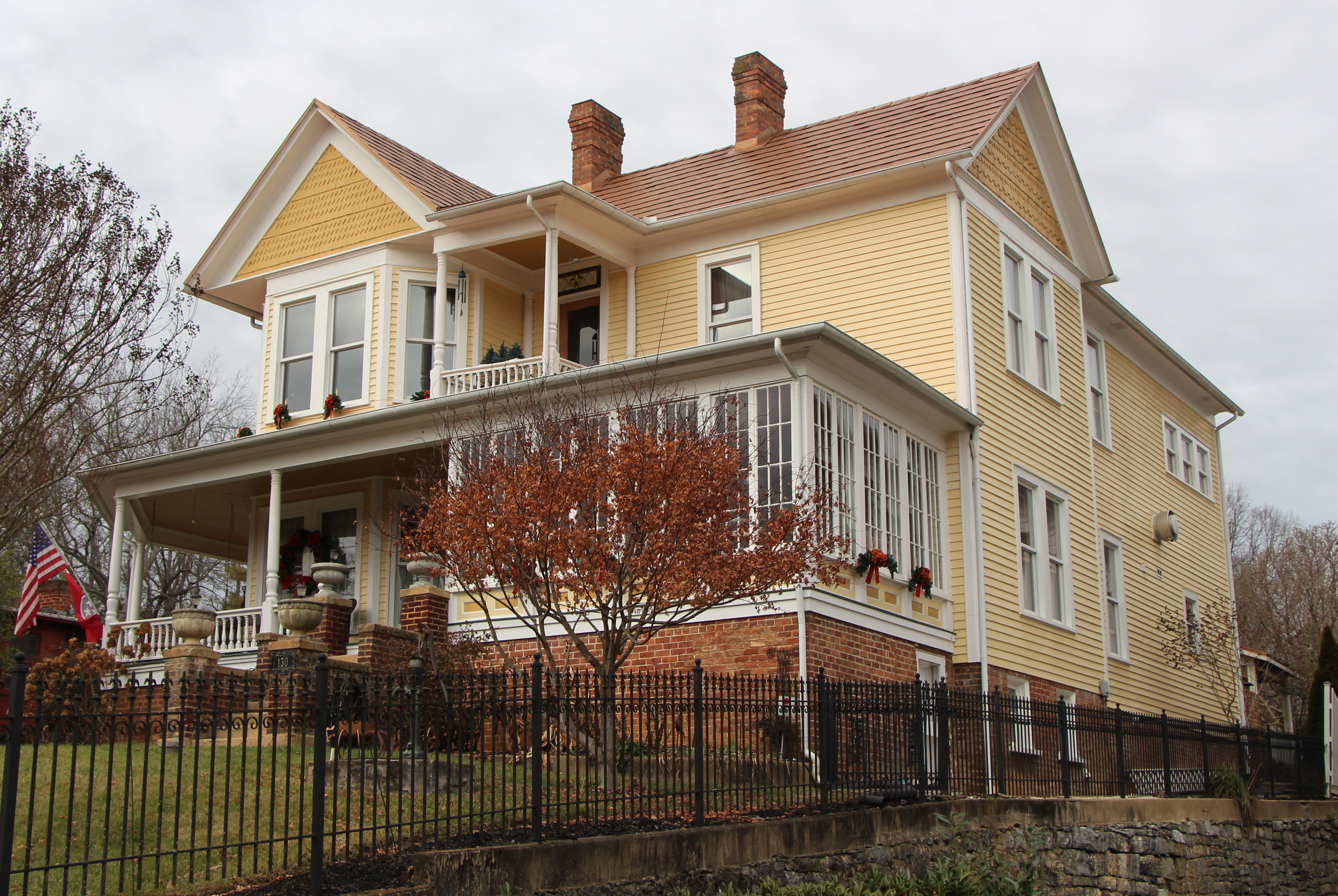
Residential House, 130 W. Main Street, built circa 1905

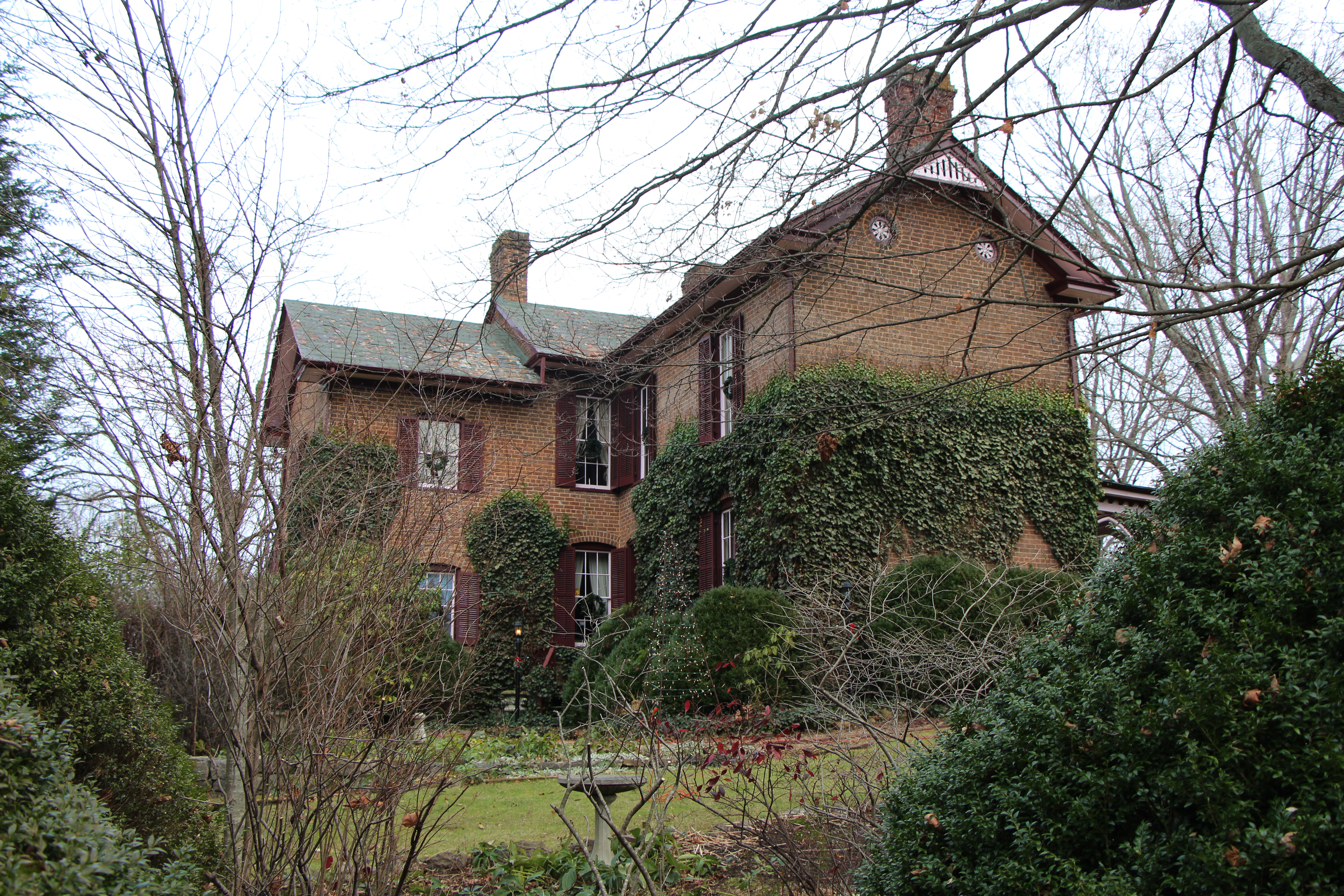
Old Deadrick House, 102 N. Cherokee, built 1878

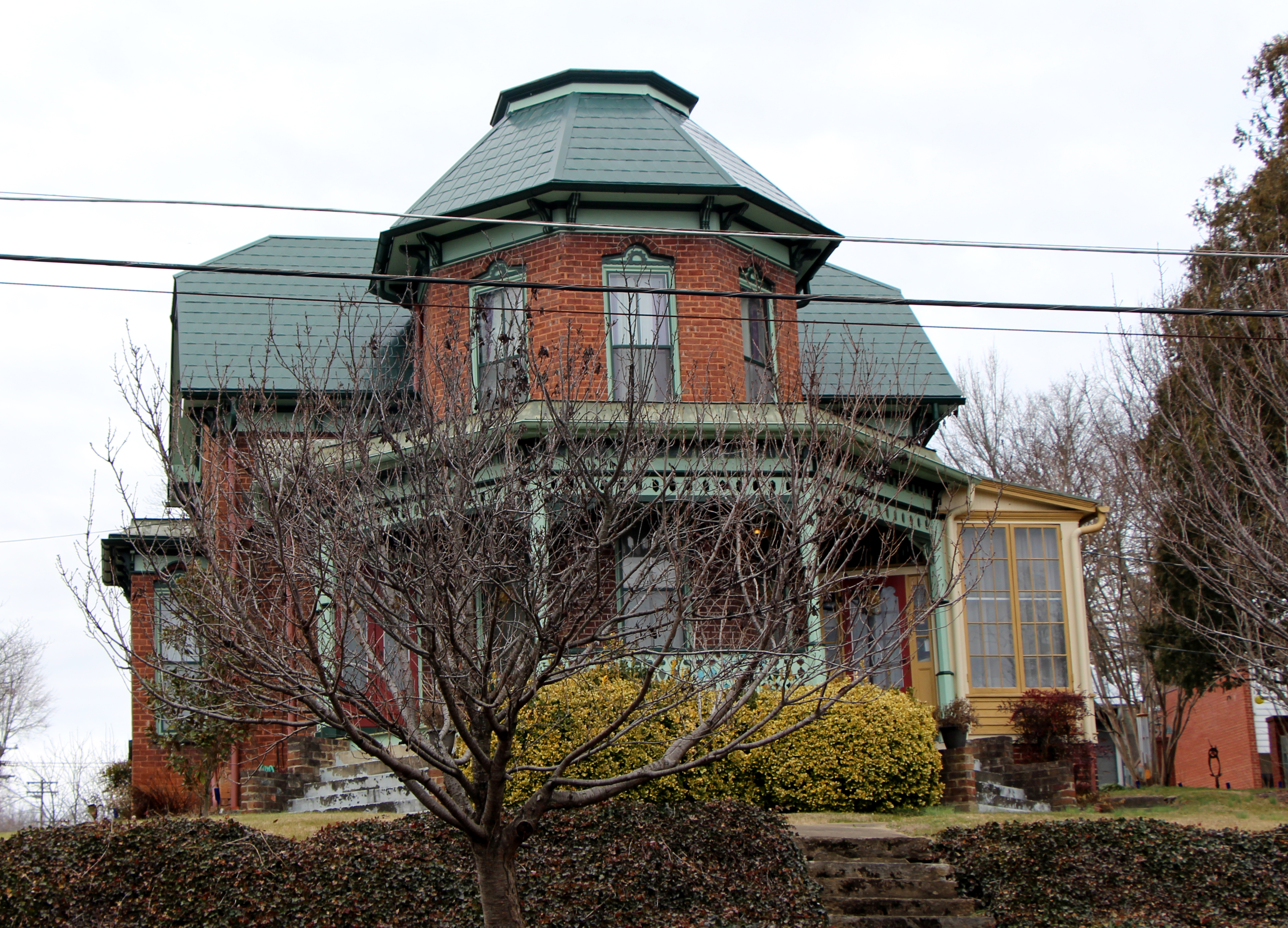
Residential House, 314 W. Main Street, built circa late 1860s with Italianate and Queen Anne influences

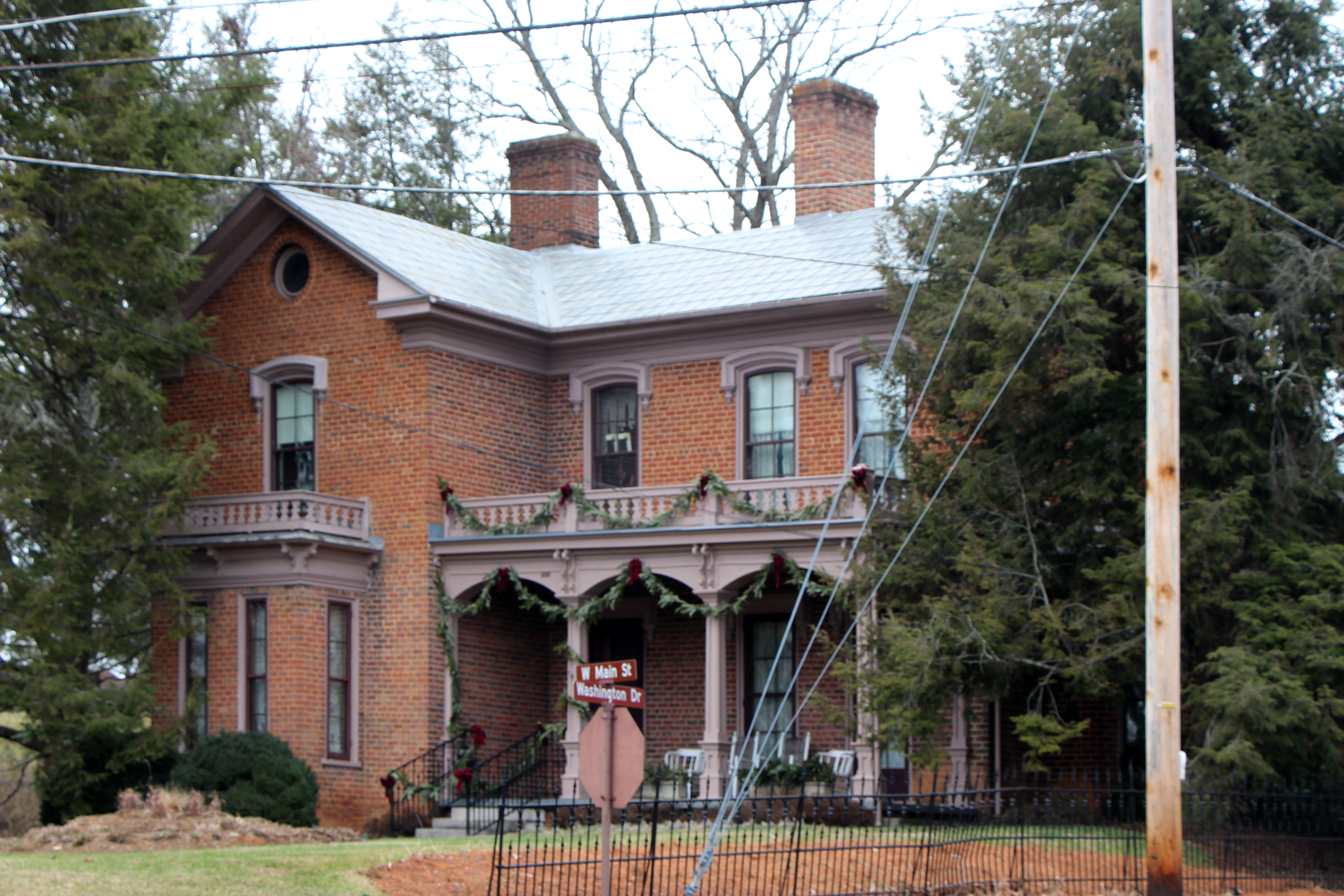
Hacker House, 400 W. Main Street, built 1869

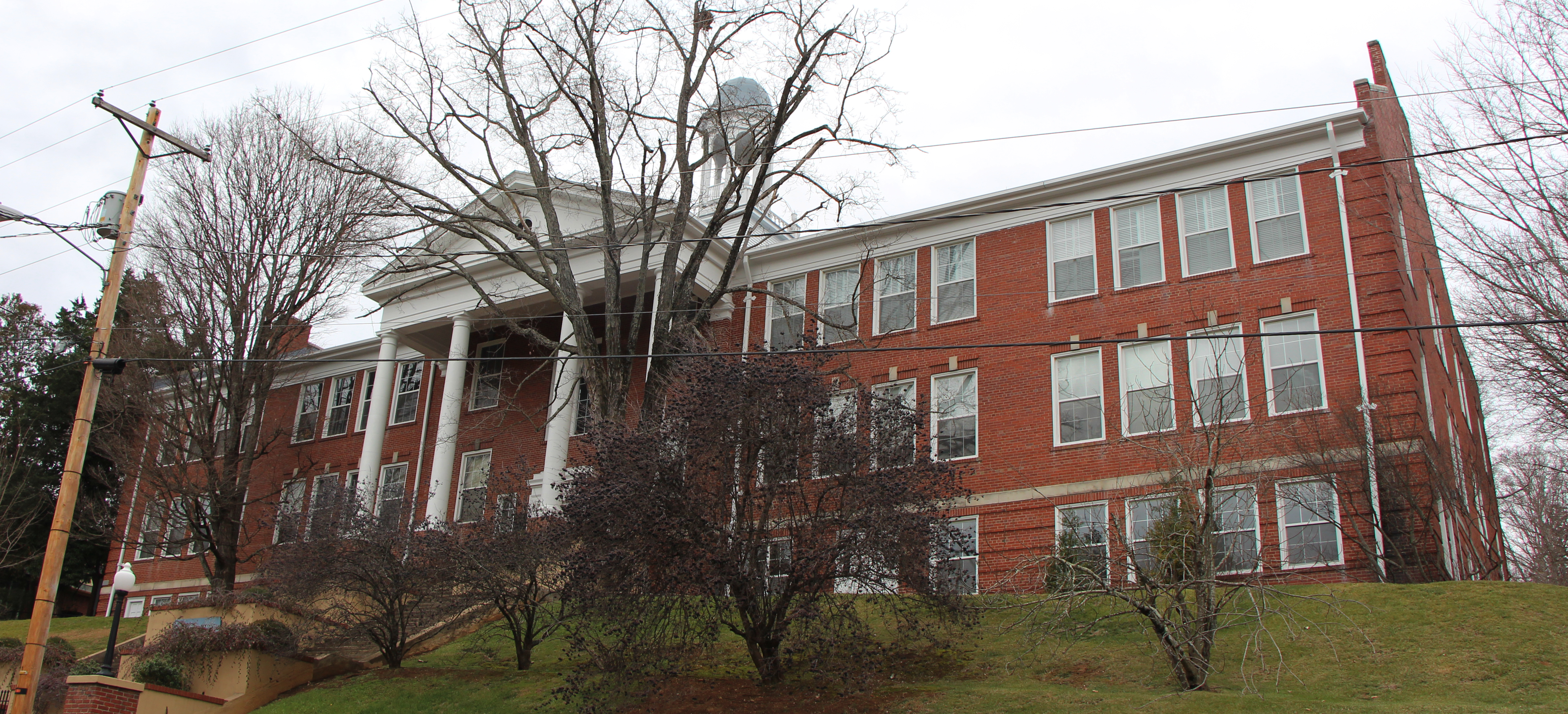
Academy Hill, 312 W. Main Street, built 1926

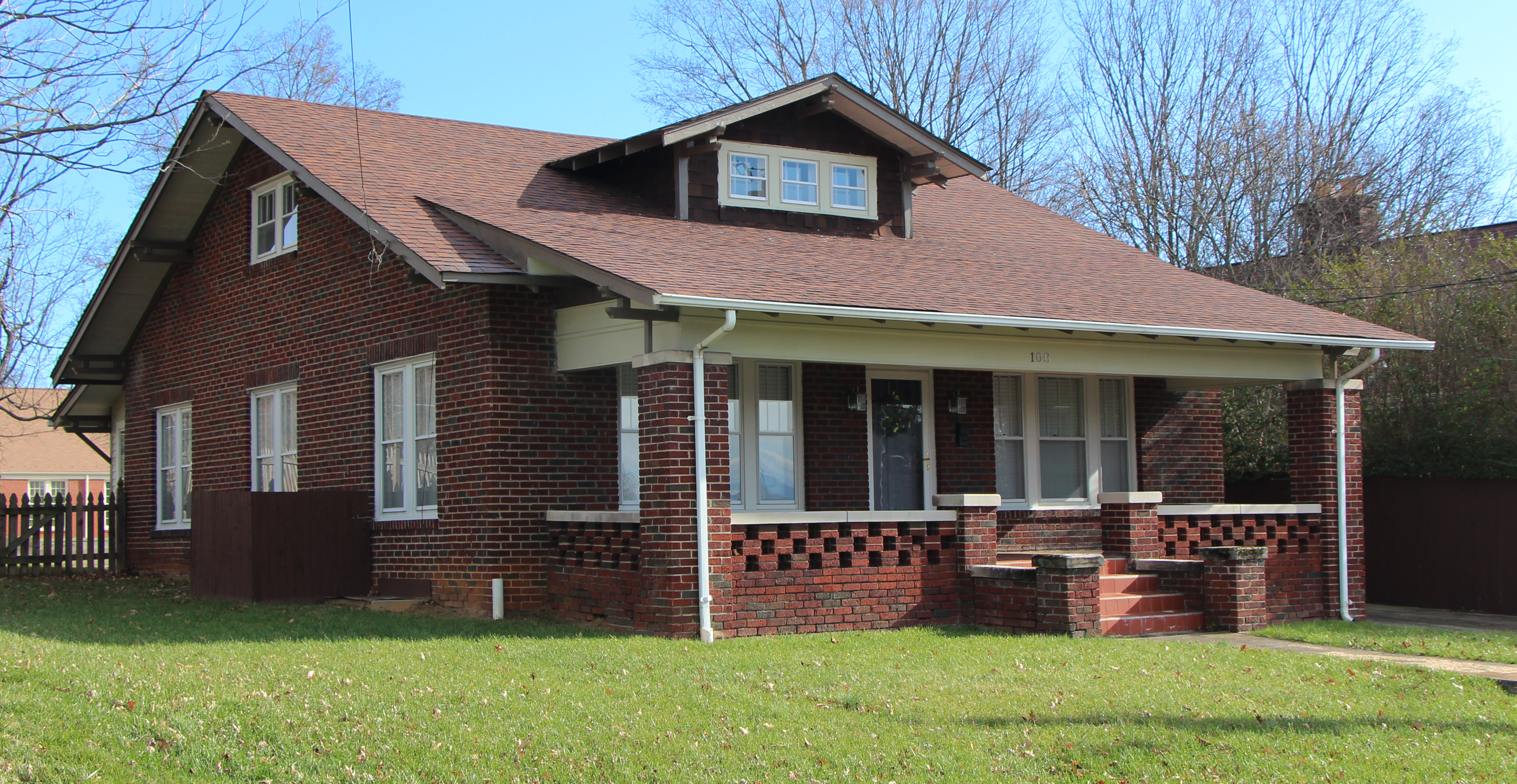
Old Clyde Haws House, 108 Oak Grove Avenue, built 1933

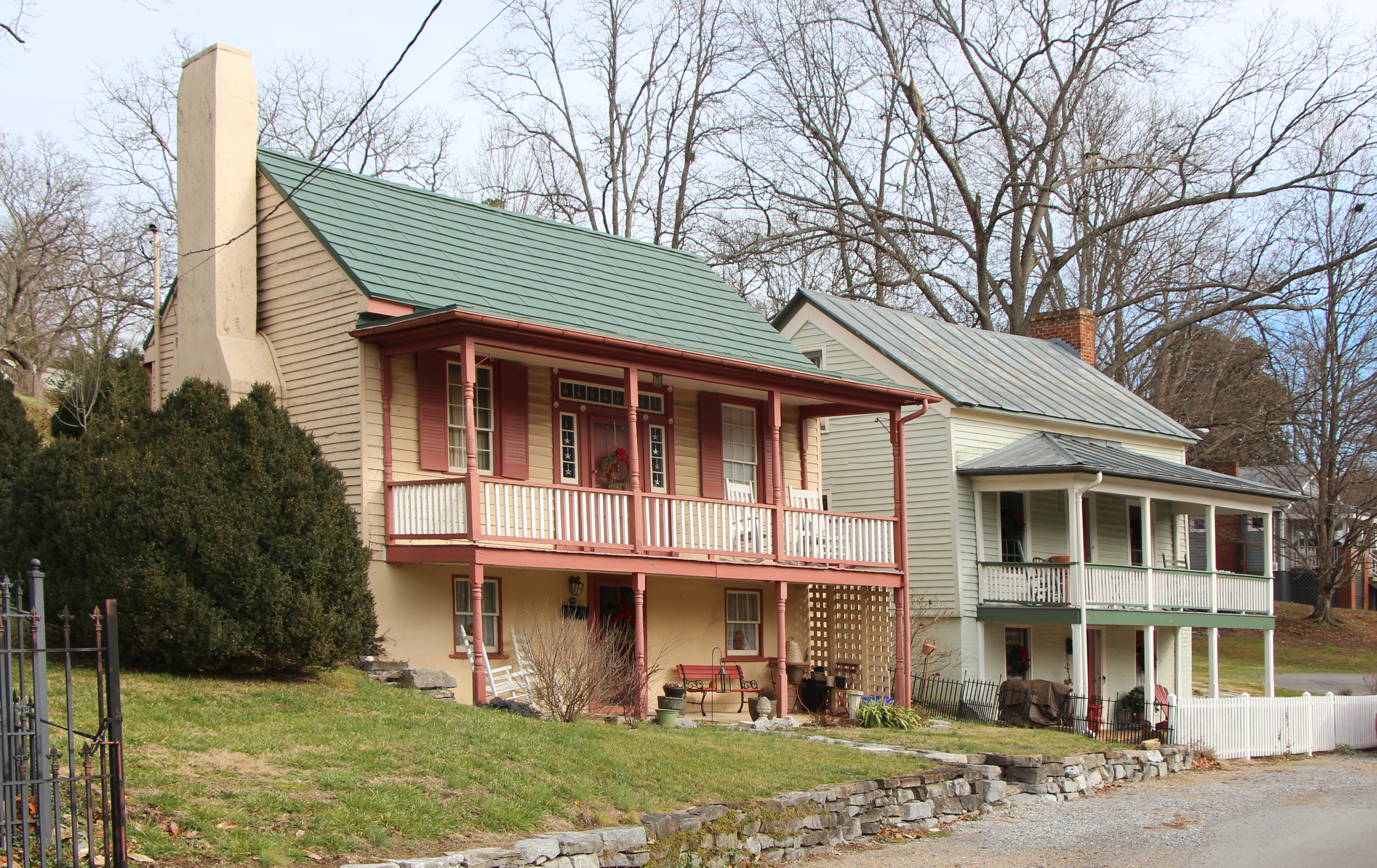
Residential Buildings, 105/107 Spring Street, built circa 1850 with Greek Revival influences

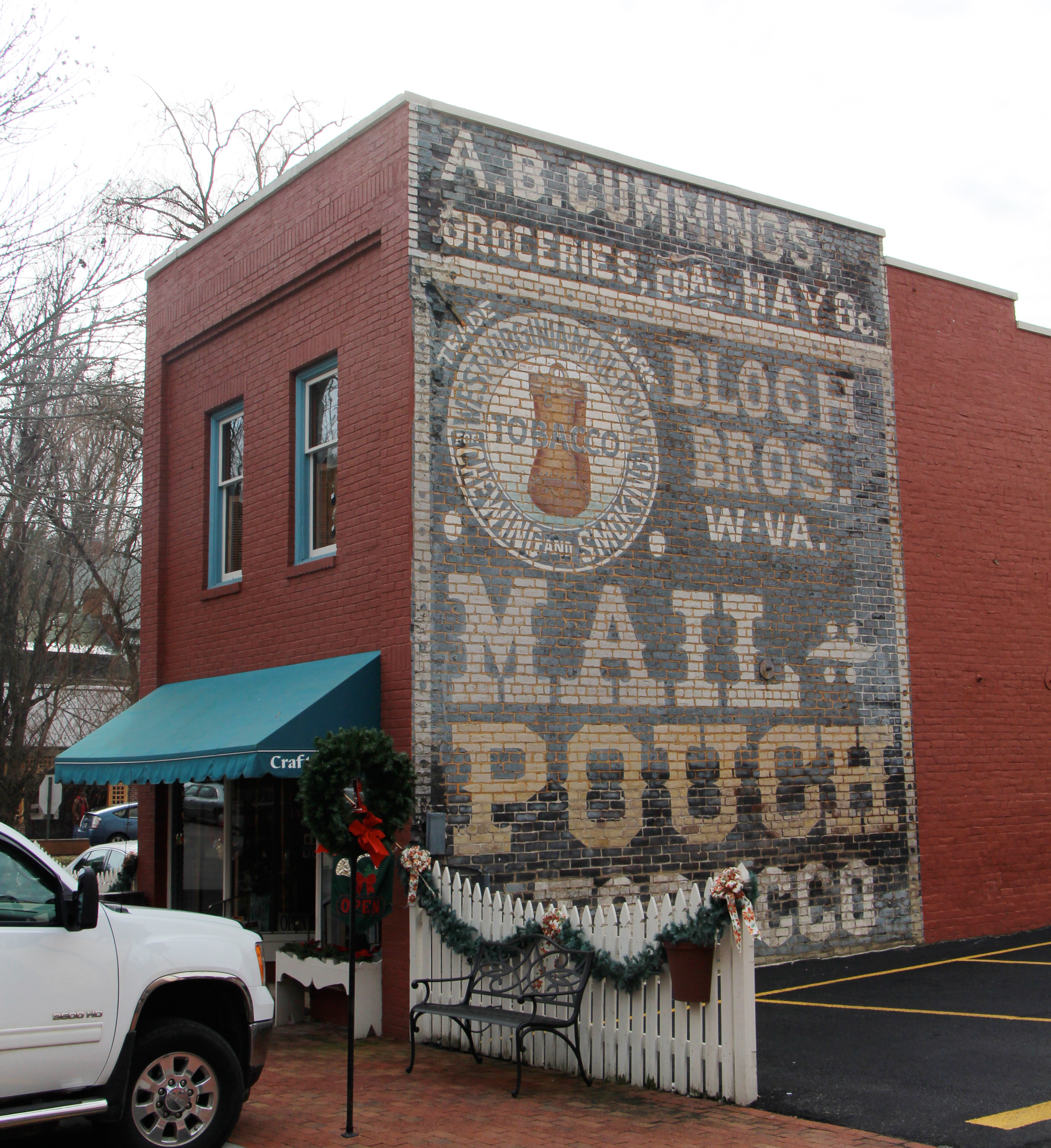
Mail Pouch Building, 104 S. Cherokee Street, built 1888; architecture is two-part commercial block
