= The Union Flag =

Tennessee newspaper

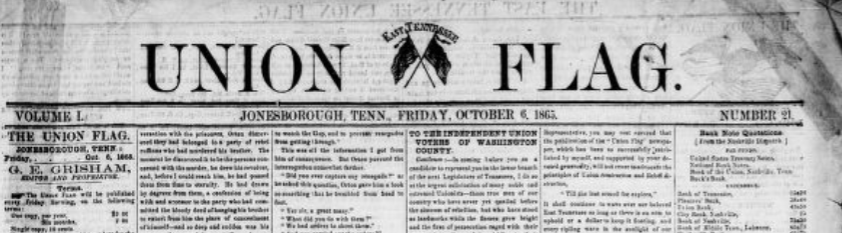
Front page/header of the Union Flag on October 6, 1865

The Union Flag was a newspaper published in Jonesborough, Tennessee, from 1865 to 1873 by George Edgar Grisham. The paper, serving the region of East Tennessee, began as a moderate paper but gradually became more radical and anti-former Confederates. Three unsuccessful attempts were made to burn down the paper's offices.

== History ==
The Union Flag was founded in mid-1865 by George Edgar Grisham (also spelled Gresham), a white man who had served in the Union Army during the American Civil War and previously co-published the Jonesborough Express. The first issue was published on October 13. Subscriptions cost $3 a year. Grisham had led a company of the 8th Tennessee Cavalry Regiment and later served directly under Major General Alvan Cullem Gillem. He was Jonesborough's postmaster in addition to publishing the paper and later led African-American soldiers in the Tennessee State Militia. A profile of the paper prepared by the University of Tennessee described the paper's tone as initially "balanced", and a history of Jonesborough deemed it "moderate", but it gradually became more partisan. This shift followed Grisham's gradual radicalization, influenced by politicians such as William G. Brownlow, and his increasingly vocal anti-Confederate stance. In addition to news and editorials, the paper included numbers of local advertisements, sensationalized stories, and poems. Three unsuccessful attempts were made to burn down the paper's offices, two in October 1866 alone, both with staff in the building. While it is unclear who attempted to set the fires, historian Ben H. Severance attributes it to upset former Confederate soldiers.

The paper's editor mocked the idea of Frederick Douglass running for president in December 1865, suggesting that white people would not want to vote for an African-American candidate. He also wrote that freed slaves only had "crude ideas of freedom", had poor character, and needed what historian Richard H. Abbott describes as "close supervision". The paper advocated confiscation and sale of the property owned by former Confederates, with the money going towards paying debts the nation incurred from the war or helping people who had been on the Union's side recoup their losses. It endorsed William B. Stokes's unsuccessful campaign in the 1869 gubernatorial election against Dewitt Clinton Senter. By that year, The Union Flag was the official publisher for Tennessee's 1st congressional district. In December 1869 Grisham added a tagline to the paper: “The star-spangled banner in triumph shall wave/O’re the land of the free and the home of the brave.” In 1871 The Union Flag was a four-page paper published weekly on Fridays and claimed that it had a circulation of 1,800. That year John G. Hayes became co-publisher of the paper and it claimed that its circulation was the largest in Eastern Tennessee. Around this time the paper became somewhat more moderate. The Union Flag ceased publication in the summer of 1873 when Grisham died of cholera.
