= Coast Range Arc =

Volcanic arc system in the Pacific Northwest

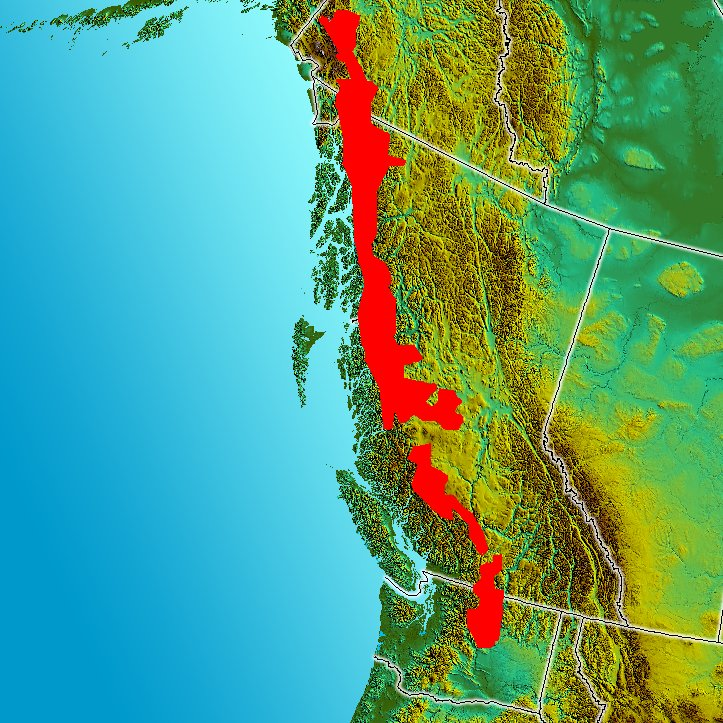
Image of the Pacific Northwest. Red indicates the inferred boundaries of the Coast Range Arc.

The Coast Range Arc was a large volcanic arc system, extending from northern Washington through British Columbia and the Alaska Panhandle to southwestern Yukon. The Coast Range Arc lies along the western margin of the North American Plate in the Pacific Northwest of western North America. Although taking its name from the Coast Mountains, this term is a geologic grouping rather than a geographic one, and the Coast Range Arc extended south into the High Cascades of the Cascade Range, past the Fraser River which is the northward limit of the Cascade Range proper.

== Geology ==
=== Evolution ===
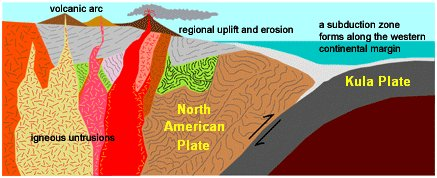
Plate tectonics of the Coast Range Arc about 75 million years ago

Volcanism in the arc began during the Late Cretaceous period 100 million years ago based on andesitic composition of the Early Cretaceous volcanic sections and their close temporal and spatial association with masses of felsic intrusive igneous rock with phaneritic texture called tonalite. The basement of the Coast Range Arc was likely Early Cretaceous and Late Jurassic intrusions. Stratigraphic and field relations in the arc suggest that the Coast Range Arc was created on Stikinia, a geologic feature that formed in an older volcanic arc environment during the Paleozoic and Mesozoic periods.

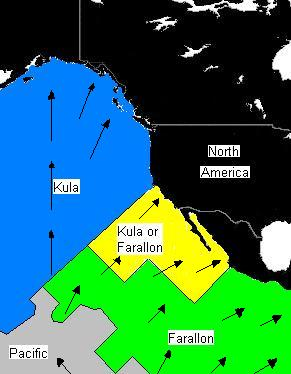
Plate distribution between 64 and 74 million years ago. Arrows represent direction of subduction along North America. Black represents present-day land area

One of the major events during the Coast Range Arc was about 85 million years ago when a huge rift developed near the center of the oceanic Farallon Plate. This rifting event created the oceanic Kula Plate. It is unknown why such a large rupture of the Farallon Plate occurred. Some geologists believe some fundamental change in convection within the Earth's mantle caused the rifting event, while others believe the huge oceanic plate became mechanically unstable as it continued to subduct beneath the Pacific Northwest. The Kula Plate once again continued to subduct beneath the continental margin, supporting the Coast Range Arc.

Volcanism began to decline along the length of the arc about 60 million years ago during the early Paleogene period of the Cenozoic era as the rapid northern movement of the Kula Plate became parallel with the Pacific Northwest, creating a transform fault plate boundary similar to the Queen Charlotte Fault. During this passive plate boundary, the Kula Plate began subducting underneath Alaska and southwestern Yukon at the northern end of the arc during the early Eocene period.

The Coast Range Arc was home to some of the world's most dangerous and explosive volcanoes. Cataclysmic eruptions at the British Columbia–Yukon border created a huge nested caldera called the Bennett Lake Volcanic Complex about 50 million years ago during the early Eocene period. These eruptions were from vents along arcuate fracture systems associated with the caldera, which discharged about 850 cubic kilometres (200 cu mi) of pyroclastic material. This volcanic event occurred shortly before nearly all the Kula Plate had been subducted beneath the North American Plate about 40 million years ago.

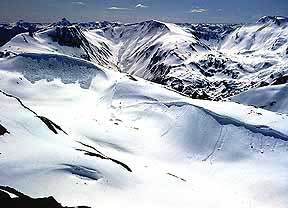
View of the Juneau Icefield and granite outcrops in the Boundary Ranges of the Coast Mountains

Since the end of the Coast Range Arc about 50 million years ago, many volcanoes have disappeared from erosion. What remains of the Coast Range Arc to this day are granitic intrusions, which were formed when magma intruded and cooled at depth beneath the volcanoes. However, remnants of some volcanoes exist in southwestern Yukon, including Montana Mountain, Mount Nansen, and the Bennett Lake, Mount Skukum and Sifton Range volcanic complexes.

Many granitic rocks of the Coast Range Arc are plentiful in the North Cascades of the Cascade Range, which is the southernmost boundary of the arc. Here, these granites intruded highly deformed ocean rocks and assorted fragments from pre-existing island arcs, largely remnants of the ancient Bridge River Ocean which lay between North America and the pre-existing Insular Islands. Massive amounts of molten granite injected over this period, burning the old oceanic sediments into a glittering medium-grade metamorphic rock called schist.

The older intrusions of the Coast Range Arc were then deformed under the heat and pressure of later intrusions, turning them into a layered metamorphic rock known as gneiss. In some places, mixtures of older intrusive rocks and the original oceanic rocks have been distorted and warped under intense heat, weight and stress to create unusual swirled patterns known as migmatite, appearing to have been nearly melted in the procedure. The remarkable migmatite of the Chelan and Skagit areas in Washington are well known in geologic circles. During construction of intrusions 70 and 57 million years ago, the northern motion of the Kula Plate might have been between 140 and 110 millimetres (5.5–4.3 in) per year. However, other geologic studies determined the Kula Plate moved at a rate as fast as 200 millimetres (7.9 in) per year.

=== Geological importance ===
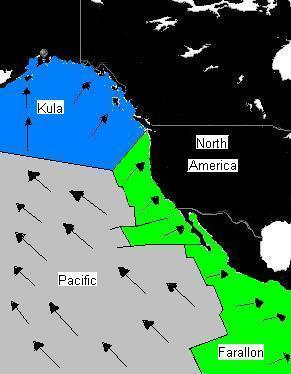
Plate distribution 55 million years ago. Arrows represent direction of subduction along North America.

Intrusions of the Coast Range Arc are intruded by widespread basaltic dikes. These dikes, although not voluminous, provide an important sampling of the post-arc lithosphere. Additionally, widespread volcanic belts, such as the Anahim Volcanic Belt, lie in the middle of the Coast Range Arc. Volcanics that form the Anahim Volcanic Belt are not strictly related to Coast Range Arc subduction, but might have formed as a result of the North American Plate sliding over a place that has experienced active volcanism for a long period of time which is described as the Anahim hotspot. During its formation, it lay beneath granitic intrusions of the Coast Range Arc. The approximately 20-kilometre (12 mi) long Bella Bella and approximately 6-kilometre (4 mi) long Gale Passage dike swarms lie in granitic intrusions of the Coast Range Arc and are used to calculate the first appearance of the Anahim hotspot about 13 and 12 million years ago.

== See also ==
- Coast Mountains
- Geology of British Columbia
- Geology of the Pacific Northwest
- Cascade Volcanoes
- Cascadia subduction zone
- Volcanism in Canada
- Pacific Ring of Fire
