= Partridge Lake (BC-Yukon) =

Lake in British Columbia anda Yukon, Canada

- Location in British Columbia
- Location: British Columbia, Yukon
- Coordinates: 59°57′50″N 135°15′07″W
- Part of: Bering Sea drainage basin
- Primary inflows: Partridge River, Jones Creek
- Primary outflows: Partridge River
- Basin countries: Canada
- Max. length: 6.5 kilometres (4.0 mi)
- Max. width: 0.8 kilometres (0.50 mi)
- Surface elevation: 699 metres (2,293 ft)

Partridge Lake is a lake in the Yukon and British Columbia, Canada that is part of the Bering Sea drainage basin. The primary inflow, at the south, and outflow, at the north, is the Partridge River, which flows via Bennett Lake, the Nares River, Tagish Lake, the Tagish River and the Yukon River to the Bering Sea. A secondary inflow, at the southwest, is Jones Creek.

== See also ==
- List of lakes of British Columbia
- List of lakes of Yukon
