= Mount McNeil =

Mountain in Yukon, Canada

Highest point
- Elevation: 2,400 m (7,900 ft)
- Coordinates: 60°08′17.9″N 135°26′59.3″W

Geography
- Location: Yukon Territory, Canada
- Parent range: Pacific Coast Ranges
- Topo map: NTS 115G3 Bighorn Creek

Geology
- Rock age: Cenozoic
- Mountain type: Lava dome
- Last eruption: Cenozoic

Mount McNeil is a rhyolite lava dome, located 41 km west of Carcross and 7 km south of Mount Skukum, Yukon Territory, Canada. It was formed during the Cenozoic eruptions of the Skukum Group.

== See also ==
- List of volcanoes in Canada
- Volcanism in Canada
