= George Nares =

British Royal Navy officer and polar explorer (1831–1915)

Vice-Admiral Sir George Nares KCB FRS
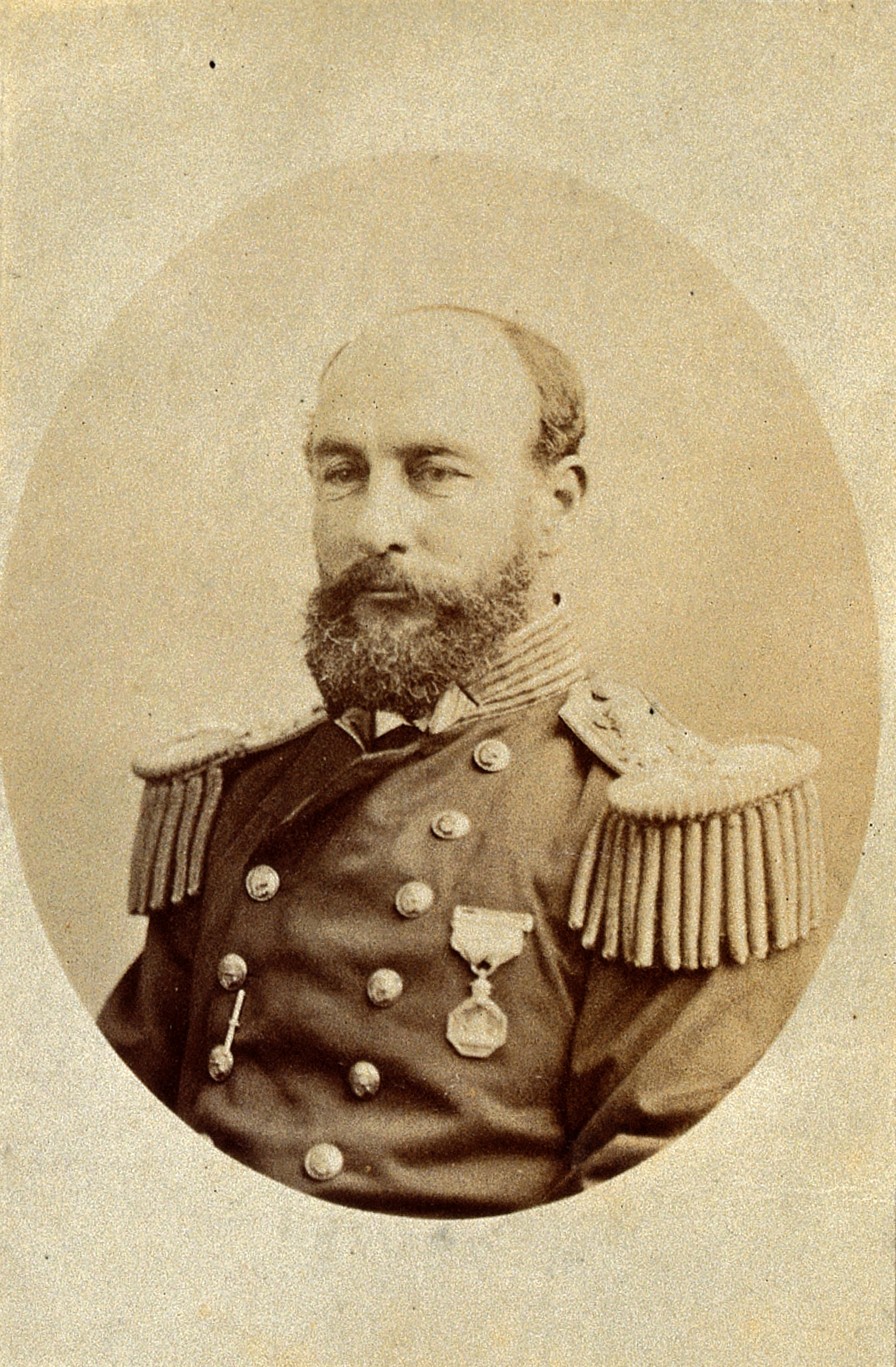
- Born: George Strong Nares; 24 April 1831; Llansenseld, UK
- Died: 15 January 1915 (aged 83); Kingston upon Thames, UK
- Military career
- Allegiance: United Kingdom
- Branch: Royal Navy
- Service years: 1845–1886
- Rank: Vice-Admiral
- Served on: HMS Canopus; HMS Havannah; HMS Resolute; HMS Conqueror; HMS Illustrious; HMS Britannia
- Commands: HMS Boscawen; HMS Salamander; HMS Newport; HMS Shearwater; HMS Challenger; HMS Alert
- Expeditions: Challenger Expedition; British Arctic Expedition
- Awards: Order of the Bath; Founder's Medal; Grande Médaille d'Or

Vice-Admiral Sir George Strong Nares (/ˈnɛəriːz/ NAIR-eez) KCB FRS (24 April 1831 – 15 January 1915) was a Royal Navy officer and Arctic explorer. He commanded the Challenger Expedition, and the British Arctic Expedition. He was highly thought of as a leader and scientific explorer. In later life he worked for the Board of Trade and as Acting Conservator of the River Mersey.

== Biography ==
=== Family ===
He was born on 24 April 1831, the third son and sixth child of Commander William Henry Nares, a British naval officer, and Elizabeth Rebecca Gould, at Llansenseld, near Abergavenny in Monmouthshire. He was baptised at the church of St Bridget, Llansanffraid on 22 May. He married Mary Grant, the eldest daughter of a Portsmouth banker, on 22 June 1858. They had four sons and six daughters. His two youngest sons, George Edward Nares and John Dodd Nares entered the Royal Navy.

=== Education and early naval career ===
He was educated at the Royal Naval School in New Cross in south London, and in 1845 joined the Royal Navy aboard HMS Canopus, an old battleship captured from the French. Following a posting to HMS Havannah on the Australian station in 1848, during which he served as both midshipman and mate, he returned in 1851 and passed his lieutenant's exam in 1852.

=== First Arctic experience ===
While returning to England in Havannah in 1851, Nares had met Commander George Henry Richards, a future Hydrographer of the Navy, who had suggested he apply to Sir Edward Belcher for a place on his search for Sir John Franklin. Nares was accepted as the second mate of Resolute, and thus gained valuable early experience of the Arctic during the 1852–1854 expedition.

=== Gunnery specialist ===
In 1854 Nares received his promotion to lieutenant and specialised as a gunnery officer. He joined the new battleship Conqueror in 1854, including service in the Mediterranean during the Crimean War. During this time he was loaned to the Aetna-class ironclad floating battery Glatton under the command of Captain Arthur Cumming. Glatton arrived in the Black Sea too late to see action.

=== Instructor and author ===
He served as a lieutenant in charge of training cadets in Illustrious, and from 1859, in her successor, Britannia. During this time he wrote the best-selling book The Naval Cadet's Guide, which was also republished under the title Seamanship, and was regarded as the best manual of its day. He was promoted to commander in 1862 and took command of the training ship Boscawen in September 1863.

=== Surveyor ===
Admiralty Chart of the Gulf of Suez, Surveyed by Nares in HMS Newport and Shearwater

His next ship was the aging 4-gun wooden paddle sloop Salamander, which he commanded from 1865. Although he had served in the steam-assisted Conqueror over ten years previously, this was his first paddle steamer, and in a further departure, she was employed in surveying duties on the east coast of Australia. His duties involved keeping the communications between Sydney and Cape York Peninsula in the furthest north point of Queensland open. On the long journeys between he conducted surveys of the Great Barrier Reef.

His next appointment was to the brand new Philomel-class gunvessel Newport, (Note: The journal Nature (21 January 1915) tells that when Newport was at Malta in 1869 the chief engineer, who was anxious not to go to sea because he wanted to attend some function on shore with his wife, asked to be given forty-eight hours to take off the cylinder covers. Captain Nares replied "By all means." The chief engineer was jubilant, but on the planned day of sailing, after the usual morning muster by division, the order was given "Hands make sail", and the ship sailed out of the harbour without the aid of the engines, much to the chagrin of the engineer staff. Nature reports this as an example of his competence under sail and that it "was a good lesson given with tact and judgement".) which he commissioned and took to the Mediterranean for survey work, including a survey of the Gulf of Suez, accessed by the newly opened Suez Canal. The Suez Canal opened in November 1869. On the morning of 17 November, a procession of ships entered the canal, officially headed by the French Imperial yacht Aigle however Newport passed through it first. On the night before the canal was due to open, Nares navigated his vessel, in total darkness and without lights, through the mass of waiting ships until it was in front of L'Aigle. When dawn broke the French were horrified to find that the Royal Navy was now first in line and that it would be impossible to pass them. Captain Nares received both an official reprimand and an unofficial vote of thanks from the Admiralty for his actions in promoting British interests and for demonstrating such superb seamanship.

Among the ships following was the Newport captained by Nares, which would survey the canal a few months later. The Admiralty required a survey and report before it would allow the canal to be used by naval vessels. G.H. Richards, Hydrographer of the Navy joined Newport in January 1870. They traversed the canal in both directions, taking soundings and checking the navigation. They approved the canal, subject to completion of improvements that were already under way.

In recognition of his work in the Gulf of Suez, Nares was promoted to the rank of captain in 1869. He commissioned Shearwater in 1871 for the Red Sea, and on the outward voyage the ship conducted studies of the water currents in the Straits of Gibraltar for William Benjamin Carpenter, a biologist who believed that density differences between water masses generated ocean currents.

=== Challenger expedition ===
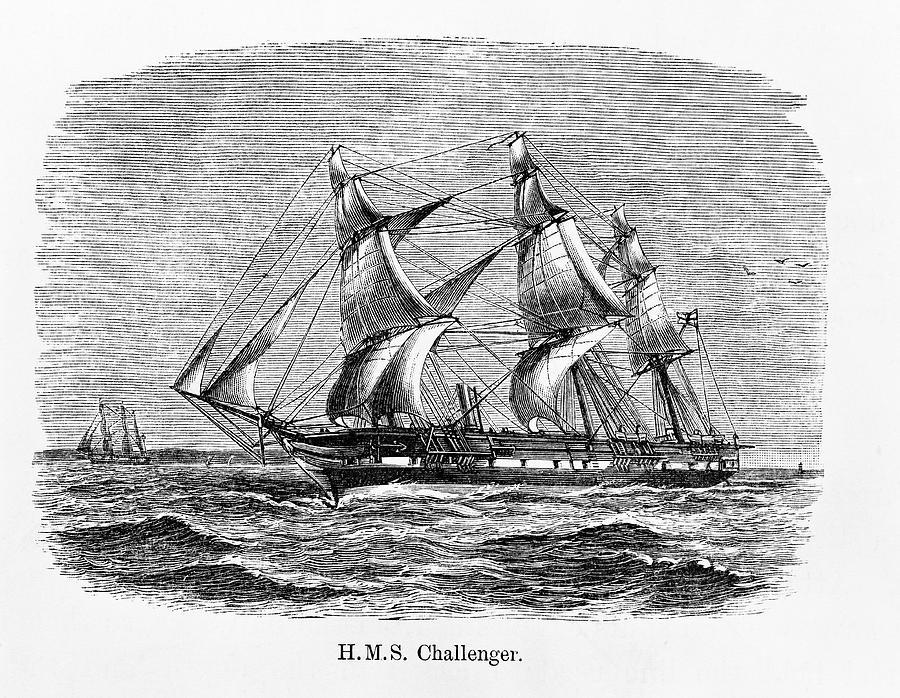
HMS Challenger

Charles Wyville Thomson and the Royal Society of London obtained the corvette Challenger from the Royal Navy for a 3-year expedition of scientific discovery. Although much of the world was well charted, this extended only to the coastlines and to very shallow depths – largely depths significant to the safe navigation of ships. There was a widely held consensus that the oceans were in parts very deep, but almost nothing was known of the make up of the deep oceans, the submarine landscape, nor the life contained within the deep ocean. Challenger was equipped to measure much of this, being loaded with specimen jars, chemical apparatus, trawls and dredges, thermometers and water sampling bottles, sounding leads and devices to collect sediment from the sea bed. Great lengths of rope were provided to allow the sounding of deep oceans, and of Italian hemp alone she carried a total length of 181 miles (291 km).

Nares was given command of the Challenger Expedition, a recognition of his experience in this field, but also of his scientific approach to surveying and exploration. His work with William Carpenter in Shearwater had been a key factor in the choice of commanding officer. His officers were all naval surveyors, and the team of civilian scientists, led by Charles Wyville Thomson.

Challenger spent a year in the Atlantic and after turning east in early 1874 she turned south in the Indian Ocean, visiting the Prince Edward, Kerguelen, and Heard Islands. She reached as far south as 66° 40′S before reaching the ice pack. In the process she became the first steam vessel to cross the Antarctic Circle.

Not all similar expeditions had been so successful, and in particular the easy relations between the scientific gentlemen and the naval officers was a testament to the sure leadership of George Nares. It was therefore a measure of his success as the commander of a scientific expedition that he was recalled in November 1874 to lead a similar but more arduous expedition at the opposite end of the earth.

=== British Arctic Expedition ===
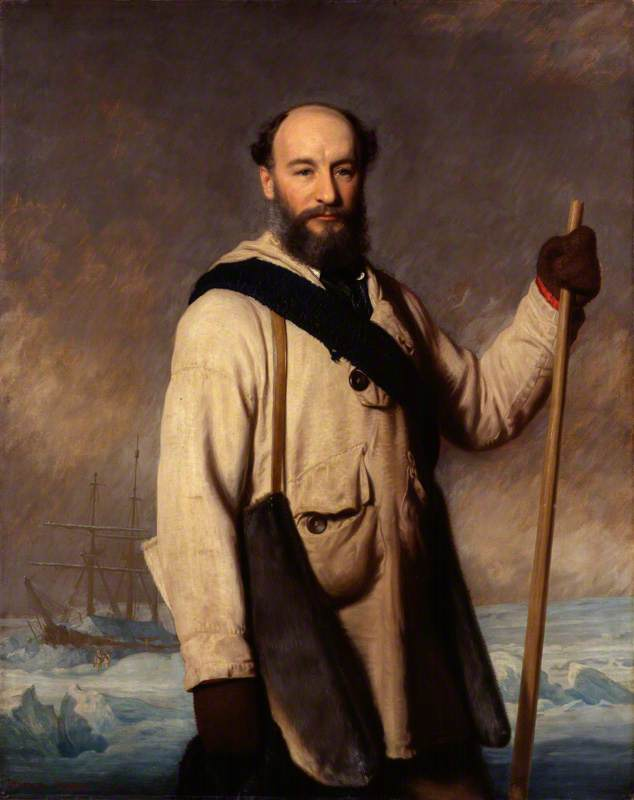
Portrait of George Nares by Stephen Pearce, 1877

Because of his previous experience in the Arctic, he was summoned from this assignment to take charge of another Arctic voyage in search of the North Pole in Discovery and Alert in 1875, the British Arctic Expedition. On this expedition, Nares became the first explorer to take his ships all the way north through the channel between Greenland and Ellesmere Island – now named Nares Strait in his honour – to the Lincoln Sea. Up to this time, it had been a popular theory that this route would lead to the supposed Open Polar Sea, an ice-free region surrounding the pole, but Nares found only a wasteland of ice. A sledging party under Albert Hastings Markham set a new record farthest north of 83° 20' 26"N, but overall the expedition was a near-disaster. The men suffered badly from scurvy and were hampered by inappropriate clothing and equipment. Realising that his men could not survive another winter in the ice, Nares hastily retreated southward with both his ships in the summer of 1876. Nares wrote an account of the expedition, Narrative of a Voyage to the Polar Sea during 1875–6 by H.M. Ships "Alert" and "Discovery" and published by Sampson, Low, Searle & Rivington of London.

Nares was elected a Fellow of the Royal Society in 1876, received the Founder's Medal of the Royal Geographical Society in 1877 and was awarded the Gold medal from the Société de Géographie in 1879. These scientific awards were matched by an appointment as a Knight Commander of the Order of the Bath in 1876.

=== Later life ===
In 1878 he was appointed in command of Alert, his ship from the Arctic expedition, in which he surveyed the Strait of Magellan. He left the ship on 11 March 1879, and from 1879 to 1896 was employed in the harbour department of the Board of Trade. During this period he retired from the Royal Navy, on 24 April 1886. He was promoted on the retired list twice, firstly in 1887 to rear-admiral, and secondly in 1892 to vice-admiral.

After leaving the Board of Trade in 1896 he became a conservator of the River Mersey, a post which he held until 1910. He was a member of the ship committee for Robert Falcon Scott's 1912 Terra Nova Expedition. His wife Mary died in 1905.

Nares died at home aged 83 at Kingston upon Thames on 15 January 1915, and was buried in Long Ditton churchyard in Surrey.

== Legacy ==
Among others, the following features are named after Nares:

- Nares Land in Greenland
- Nares Strait between Ellesmere Island and Greenland
- Mount Nares, part of the Churchill Mountains in Antarctica
- Nares Lake in southern Yukon between Bennett Lake and Tagish Lake
- Nares Deep, the deepest part of the North Atlantic
- Nares Cape, on Ellesmere Island
- Nares River, from Nares Lake past Carcross to Bennett Lake
- Nares Mountain, in Yukon, named in 1883 by Lieutenant Schwatka of the US Army
- Nares Inlet, Ontario
- County of Nares in Queensland, Australia
