= Carcross Desert =

Sand dune field in Yukon Territory, Canada

Coordinates: 60°11′14″N 134°41′41″W

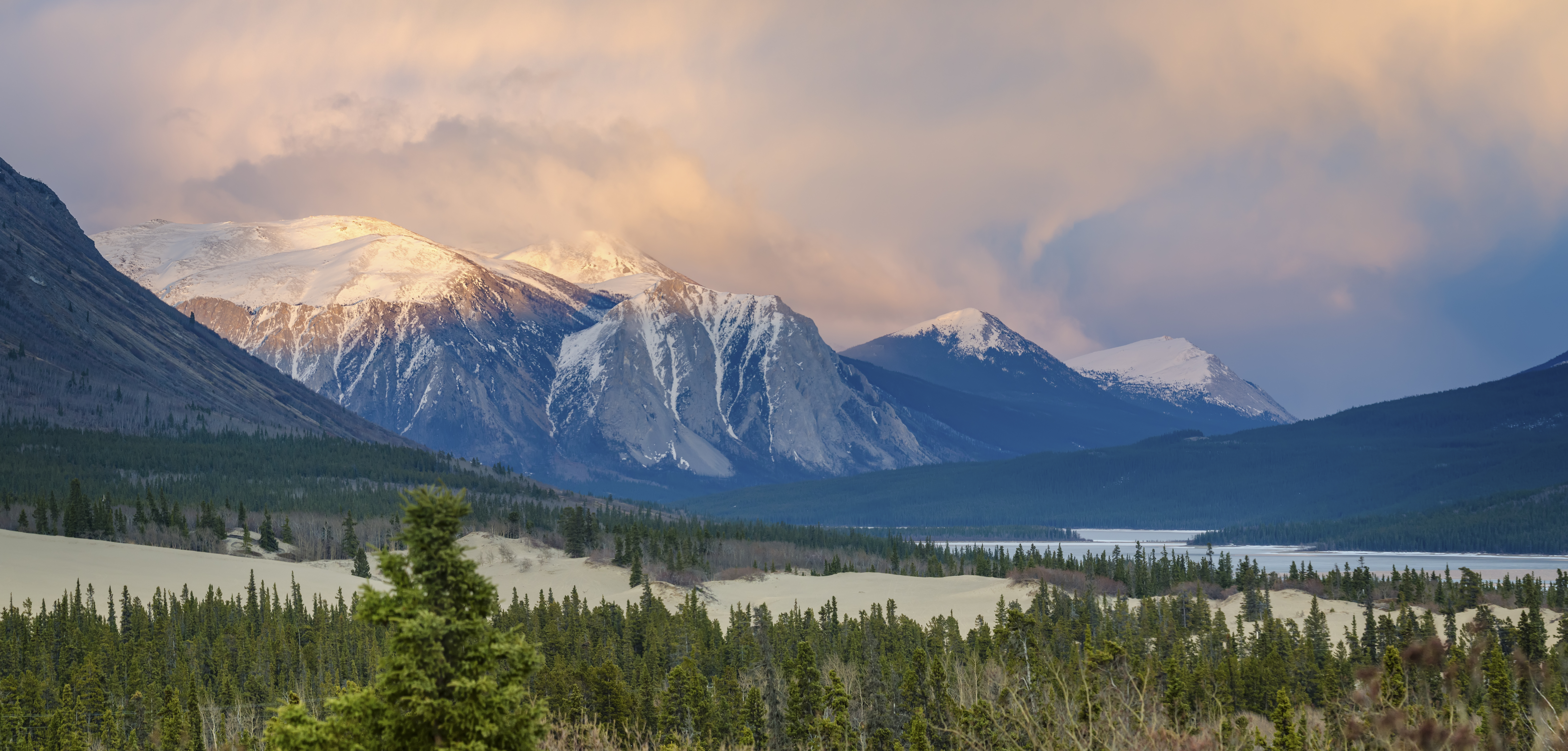
Carcross Desert in May with Nares Lake in the background

Carcross Desert, located outside Carcross, Yukon, Canada, is a series of sand dunes. The Carcross Desert measures approximately 2.6 km^{2} (1.0 sq mi), or (2.6 sq km) or 259 ha (640 acres).

== Background information ==
Carcross Desert is commonly referred to as a desert, but is actually a series of northern sand dunes. The area's climate is too humid to be considered a true desert. The sand was formed during the last glacial period, when large glacial lakes formed and deposited silt. When the lakes dried, the dunes were left behind. Today, sand comes mainly from nearby Bennett Lake, carried by wind. The dunes contain a wide variety of plants, including unusual species such as Baikal sedge (Carex sabulosa) and Yukon lupine, among others.

The Government of Yukon has made efforts to protect Carcross Desert in 1992, but failed due to opposition from locals who use the dunes for recreational purposes.

== Climate ==
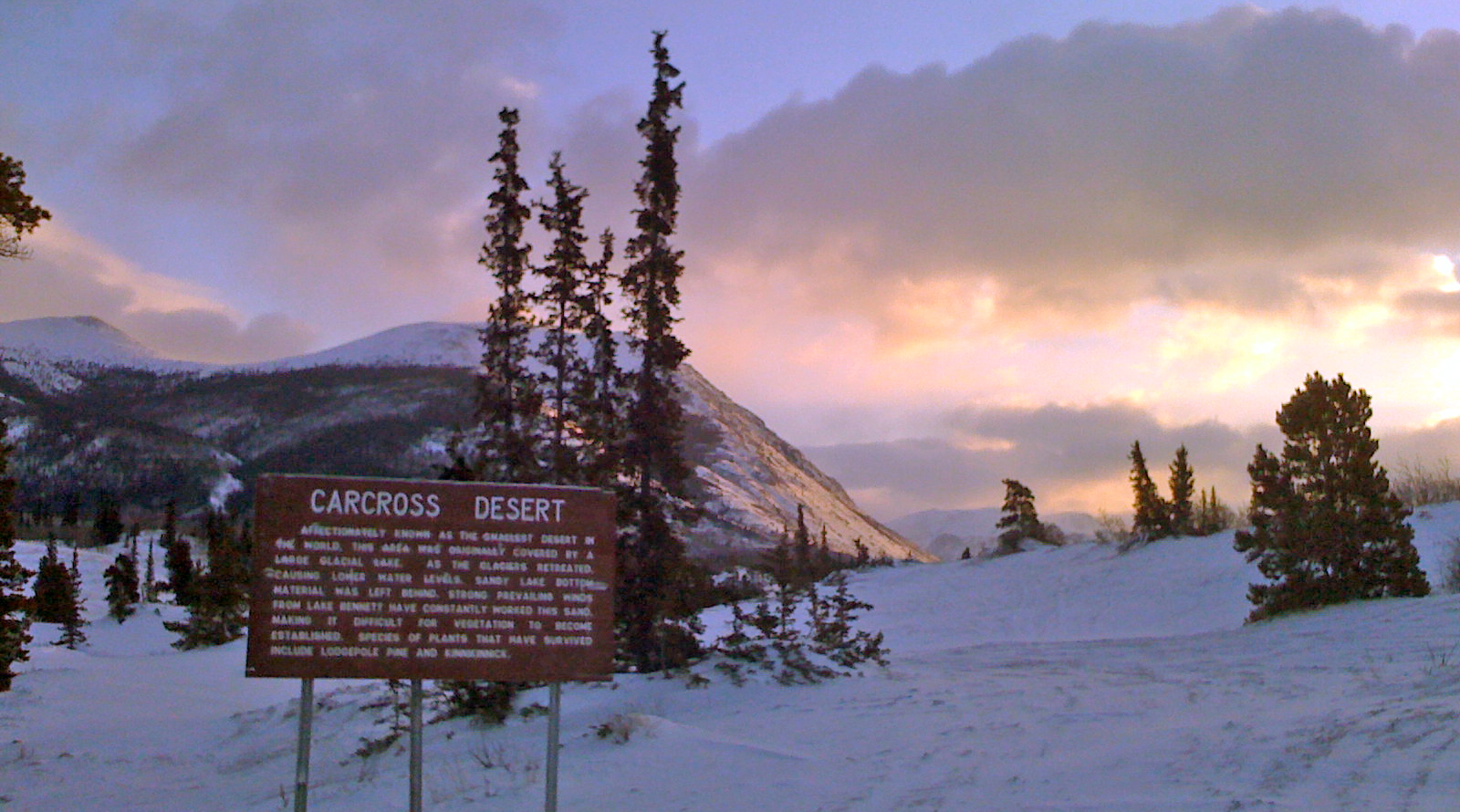
Carcross Desert in winter.

Carcross Desert is significantly drier than the surrounding region, receiving less than 50 cm (20 in) of precipitation per year. This is due in part to a rain shadow effect caused by surrounding mountains. As a result, several rare species of plant life have taken hold in the comparatively arid conditions. Carex sabulosa, the Baikal sedge, is only known to exist in four other sites in North America, mainly existing in Asia. Yukon lupine, also unusual for the surroundings, "grows like a weed." While the vegetation in the area currently locks much of the dune system in place, a large event such as a forest fire could easily clear out the vegetation and return the dunes to an active state.

== Recreation ==
The dunes are used by locals for sandboarding. Tourist groups also use the area for off-road scenic tours, which is allowed on the fine-grained dunes. Other summer activities include beach volleyball, hiking, skydiving, and all-terrain vehicles.

In the winter, the area is used mainly for cross-country skiing and snowboarding.

The nearby White Pass and Yukon Route is a popular tourist attraction, bringing many tourists each year to the Carcross area.

Orienteering competitions are held on a map bearing name Carcross Desert which includes parts of the landmark.
