= Tagish language =

Extinct Athabaskan language of the Yukon

Tagish
- Dene K'e
- Tā̀gish
- Native to: Canada
- Region: Northwest Territories, Yukon
- Ethnicity: Tagish people
- Extinct: 2008, with the death of Lucy Wren
- Language family: Na-Dené: Athabaskan; Northern Athabaskan; Central Cordillera; Tagish
- Writing system: Latin script

Language codes
- ISO 639-3: tgx
- Glottolog: tagi1240
- ELP: Tagish
- Tagish is classified as Extinct by UNESCO.

Tagish is an extinct Athabaskan language spoken by the Tagish or Carcross-Tagish, a First Nations people that historically lived in the Northwest Territories and Yukon in Canada. The Tagish people refer to themselves as /ta:gizi dene/, literally "Tagish people", where /ta:gizi/ is a place name meaning "it (spring ice) is breaking up".

The language is a Northern Athabaskan language, closely related to Tahltan and Kaska. The three languages are often grouped together as Tahltan-Kaska-Tagish; the three languages are sometimes considered dialects of the same language. As of 2004, there was only 1 native fluent speaker of Tagish documented: Lucy Wren (Agaymā/Ghùch Tlâ). She died in 2008.

The Tagish language includes nouns, verbs, and particles. Particles and nouns are single, sometimes compounded, morphemes, but the difference is that nouns can be inflected and particles cannot. Verbs are the most complex class in this language because their stemmed morphemes have many prefixes which indicate inflectional and derivational categories.

== Classification ==
Tagish is a Northern Athabaskan language, which is a subgrouping of the large Na-Dene language family. Tagish is closely related to neighboring languages Tahltan and Kaska (forming a complex known as Tagish-Tahltan-Kaska) and Southern Tutchone. The languages in this complex have an extremely similar lexicon and grammar but differ in systems of obstruents. It is alternatively known as Dene K'e.

== Geographic distribution ==
The Tagish people make their territory in southern Yukon Territory and northern British Columbia in Canada, most specifically at Tagish, which lies between Marsh Lake and Tagish Lake, and Carcross, located between Bennett and Nares Lake. The language was used most frequently in the Lewes and Teslin plateaus.

== History ==
The culture of the Tagish people has its roots in both the coastal indigenous cultures and those from the interior (Tlingit and Athabaskan, respectively). Trade and travel across the Chilkoot pass contributed to the mixing of these cultures. In the 19th and early 20th centuries, Tlingit-speaking peoples began to move in from the coast and intermarry with the native Tagish-speaking population. By the time outsiders first made contact in the 1880s, the majority of the people were bilingual, and the Tlingit language had replaced Tagish as the language of the majority.

Tagish became less common partially because native traditions were domesticated and suppressed in writing by the colonial administration. The most significant impact on the decline of nearly every native language in Canada came when aboriginal children were forced to attend residential schools where they were forbidden to speak their own languages.

After the Yukon Gold Rush in 1898, English became the majority language of the area. As the majority of children attended the English-only Chooutla Anglican school nearby, fluency in the native languages began to be lost. Language courses began to be reintroduced in the 1970s, but the programs had little funding and were not comparable to the French or English programs present. More recently, political awareness has led to movements to gain constitutional provisions for the language, as well as a greater focus on in-school programs, language conferences, and public awareness. For example, beginning in 2004, Southern Tutchone and Tagish languages were being revitalized and protected through an on-line approach called FirstVoices.

The federal government signed an agreement giving the territory $4.25 million over five years to "preserve, develop and enhance aboriginal languages"; however, Tagish was not one of the offered native language programs. Ken McQueen stated that despite efforts, the language will likely become extinct after the last fluent Tagish speaker dies.

=== Documentation ===
Tagish was one of the first languages to be added to the FirstVoices digital multimedia archive of endangered indigenous languages. FirstVoices is an indigenous language computer database and web-based teaching and development tool. Resources on the site include sound files of name pronunciation, word lists, and some children's books written in the language.

=== Notable people ===
Angela Sidney was a prominent activist for the use and reclamation of her Tagish language and heritage in the southern Yukon Territory. Born in 1902, her heritage was Tagish on her father's side and Tlingit on her mother's side. Sidney's accomplishments include working with Julie Cruikshank, documenting and authoring traditional stories as well as becoming a member of the Order of Canada in 1986. Sidney died in 1991.

Lucy Wren was the last known fluent speaker. She was actively involved in the recordings and stories used on the First Voices website including the "Our Elders Statement" before passing in 2008. This work by Lucy Wren has been continued by her son Norman James as he works to record more language and culture of the Tagish and Tlingit people for the Yukon Native Language Centre and the First Voices website.

== Phonology ==
The Tagish language includes aspiration, glottalization, nasal sounds, resonance, and tones.

Tagish is characterized by the simplest stem-initial consonant system of the Northern Athabaskan languages, has a conservative vowel system and conserves stem-final consonants. Final glottalization is lost. Constricted vowels are pronounced with low tone.

The total inventory of phonemes present in Tagish includes:

=== Consonants ===
		Labial	Alveolar			Post- alveolar	Velar	Glottal
		Labial	plain	sibilant	lateral	Post- alveolar	Velar	Glottal
Plosive	plain		t ⟨d⟩	t͡s ⟨dz⟩	t͡ɬ ⟨dl⟩	t͡ʃ ⟨j⟩	k ⟨g⟩	ʔ ⟨'⟩
Plosive	aspirated		tʰ ⟨t⟩	t͡sʰ ⟨ts⟩	t͡ɬʰ ⟨tl⟩	t͡ʃʰ ⟨ch⟩	kʰ ⟨k⟩	
Plosive	ejective		tʼ ⟨t'⟩	t͡sʼ ⟨ts'⟩	t͡ɬʼ ⟨tl'⟩	t͡ʃʼ ⟨ch'⟩	kʼ ⟨k'⟩	
Plosive	prenasal	ᵐb ⟨mb⟩	ⁿd ⟨nd⟩					
Nasal		m ⟨m⟩	n ⟨n⟩					
Fricative	voiceless			s ⟨s⟩	ɬ ⟨ł⟩	ʃ ⟨sh⟩	x ⟨x⟩	h ⟨h⟩
Fricative	voiced			z ⟨z⟩	ɮ ⟨l⟩	ʒ ⟨zh⟩	ɣ ⟨ÿ⟩	
Semivowel						j ⟨y⟩	w ⟨w⟩	

=== Vowels ===
	Oral		Nasal	
	Front	Back	Front	Back
Close	i iː	u uː	ĩ ĩː	ũ ũː
Mid	e eː	o oː		
Open		a aː		ã ãː

Vowels can be either oral or nasal. They are also distinguished by length, but Gordon Marsh has noted that the length distinction may be prosodic rather than phonemic.

Long vowels are denoted with a macron as follows: ⟨ā⟩. Nasal vowels are denoted by a hook as follows: ⟨ᶏ⟩.

=== Tone ===
High tone is marked with (v́) on short vowels and (v́v) on long vowels while low tones remain unmarked.

== Orthography ==
The language makes use of the Latin writing system.

== Vocabulary ==
Some women's names contain the nasalized prefix Maa which translates directly to "mother of."

== See also ==
- Tagish
- Tahltan
