= TGX =

TGX may refer to:

- MAN TGX, a German series of trucks made since 1999
- Tagish language, spoken in the Yukon, Canada (ISO 639:tgx)
