= Sifton Range volcanic complex =

The Sifton Range volcanic complex is an early Cenozoic volcanic complex in southwestern Yukon, Canada. It is the northernmost volcanic center of the Skukum Group and is made of a 700 m thick, shallow-dipping, volcanic sequence dominated by middle lavas and pyroclastic deposits.

== See also ==
- Volcanism of Northern Canada
- List of volcanoes in Canada
