= Mount Skukum Volcanic Complex =

Early Eocene caldera complex in Canada

Highest point
- Elevation: 2,382 m (7,815 ft)
- Prominence: 997 m (3,271 ft)
- Coordinates: 60°11′40.9″N 135°29′24.0″W

Geography
- Location: Yukon, Canada
- Parent range: Coast Mountains
- Topo map: NTS 105D3 Fenwick Creek

Geology
- Rock age: Eocene
- Mountain type: Caldera
- Last eruption: Eocene

Climbing
- Easiest route: Scramble

The Mount Skukum Volcanic Complex is an early Eocene caldera complex, located 43 km west of Carcross and 32 kilometres (20 mi) northeast of Mount Porsild in the Yukon Territory, Canada. The complex composes the Skukum Group, and is part of the Sloko Volcanic Province. It is a northeast-trending complex of subaerial volcanic and volcaniclastic rocks covering 140 km^{2}.

The Mount Skukum Volcanic Complex was formed when the ancient Kula Plate was subducting under North America during the early Eocene period.

== See also ==
- Volcanism of Northern Canada
- Bennett Lake Volcanic Complex
- List of volcanoes of Canada
