= Tagish Highland =

Landform of the western coast of North America

- Highland
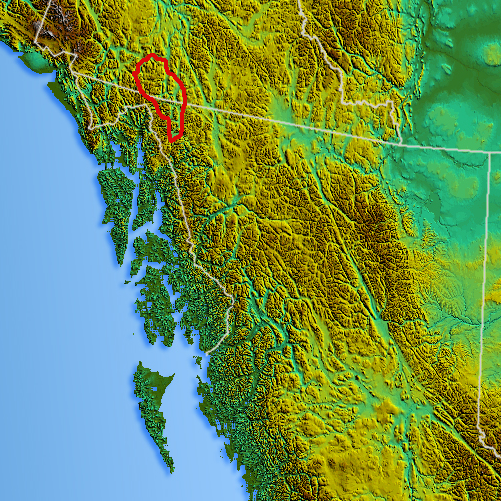
- Coordinates: 59°25′N 134°00′W
- Location: British Columbia and Yukon
- Part of: Boundary Ranges and Stikine Plateau

The Tagish Highland is an upland area on the inland side of the northernmost Boundary Ranges of the Coast Mountains, spanning far northwestern British Columbia from Atlin Lake to the area of the pass at Champagne, Yukon between the Alsek and Yukon Rivers. In some classification systems, and in local terminology, the Tagish Highland is considered to be part of the Boundary Ranges, as is the neighbouring Tahltan Highland to its south. As classified by the Canadian Mountain Encyclopedia per S. Holland, the Tagish Highland is part of the system unofficially described as the Interior Mountains (also the Northern Interior Mountains).

It is not as high or glacial as the neighbouring areas of the Boundary Ranges, but it is very rugged with extreme variations in relief. Historically it is notable as the location of the network of valleys leading inland from the Chilkoot and White Passes from the Yukon Ports of Skagway and Haines, Alaska to the headwaters of the Yukon River, downstream from which prospectors voyaged to the legendary goldfields of the Klondike Gold Rush.

== Sub-ranges ==
- Bennett Range
- Sloko Range
- White Range
