= White Range =

Mountain range in British Columbia and Yukon, Canada

- Location within British Columbia Location within Yukon

Geography
- Country: Canada
- Provinces: British Columbia and Yukon
- Parent range: Tagish Highland

The White Range is a subrange of the Tagish Highland, located east of Windy Arm on the British Columbia-Yukon border in Canada.
