= Partridge River (Canada) =

Location
- Country: Canada
- Territory/Province: Yukon; British Columbia

Physical characteristics
- Source: Unnamed mountain
  - location: British Columbia
  - coordinates: 59°56′15″N 135°30′00″W
  - elevation: 1,661 m (5,449 ft)
- Mouth: Bennett Lake
  - location: Yukon
  - coordinates: 60°02′24″N 135°09′58″W
  - elevation: 641 m (2,103 ft)

Basin features
- River system: Bering Sea drainage basin

The Partridge River is a river in the Yukon and British Columbia, Canada. It is in the Bering Sea drainage basin and is a tributary of Bennett Lake.

== Course ==
The river begins at an unnamed mountain in British Columbia at 1,661 metres (5,449 ft) and flows north, then abruptly turns southeast. It takes in an unnamed tributary from the right, heads northeast through Partridge Lake, where it passes into the Yukon, and reaches its mouth on the West Arm of Bennett Lake. Bennett Lake flows via the Nares River, the Tagish River and the Yukon River to the Bering Sea.

== Tributaries ==
- Lemieux Creek (right)
- Jones Creek (left)
