= CIKO-FM =

- Carcross, Yukon; Canada
- Frequency: 97.5 MHz (FM)

Programming
- Format: Community radio

Ownership
- Owner: Ghuch Tla Community School; (Carcross Radio Society)

History
- First air date: 1997

Technical information
- Licensing authority: CRTC
- ERP: 5 watts
- Transmitter coordinates: 60°09′59″N 134°42′13″W

CIKO-FM is a Canadian high school radio station, broadcasting at 97.5 FM in Carcross, Yukon.

Owned and operated by Carcross Radio Society (Ghuch Tla Community School, formerly known as Carcross Community School), the station was licensed by the CRTC on October 2, 1997.

== See also ==
- List of high school radio stations in Canada
