= Nares River =

- Etymology: Named for George Nares

Location
- Country: Canada
- Territory: Yukon
- Province: British Columbia

Physical characteristics
- Source: Bennett Lake
  - coordinates: 60°09′49″N 134°42′28″W
  - elevation: 641 m (2,103 ft)
- Mouth: Tagish Lake
  - coordinates: 60°08′54″N 134°37′37″W
  - elevation: 641 m (2,103 ft)

Basin features
- River system: Bering Sea drainage basin

The Nares River is a river in the Yukon and British Columbia, Canada. It is in the Bering Sea drainage basin, is a tributary of Tagish Lake, and is named for George Nares, a naval officer.

The river begins at Bennett Lake at the community of Carcross, flows through Nares Lake, and reaches its mouth at Tagish Lake at Ten Mile Point. Tagish Lake flows via the Tagish River and the Yukon River to the Bering Sea.
