= Bennett Range =

Mountain range in British Columbia and Yukon, Canada

- Location within British Columbia

Geography
- Country: Canada
- Provinces: British Columbia and Yukon
- Range coordinates: 59°55′N 134°59′W
- Parent range: Tagish Highland
- Topo map(s): NTS 104M14 Homan Lake; NTS 104M15 Tutshi Lake

The Bennett Range is a subrange of the Tagish Highland, located on the west side of Bennett Lake in Yukon and British Columbia, Canada.

== Name origin ==
The lake from which the range name comes was named in 1883 by Frederick Schwatka, US Army officer and explorer, after James Gordon Bennett Jr (1841–1918), editor of the New York Herald, who was sponsor of Schwatchka's search for the remains of the Franklin Expedition, 1878–81.
