= Montana Mountain =

Canadian deeply eroded stratovolcano

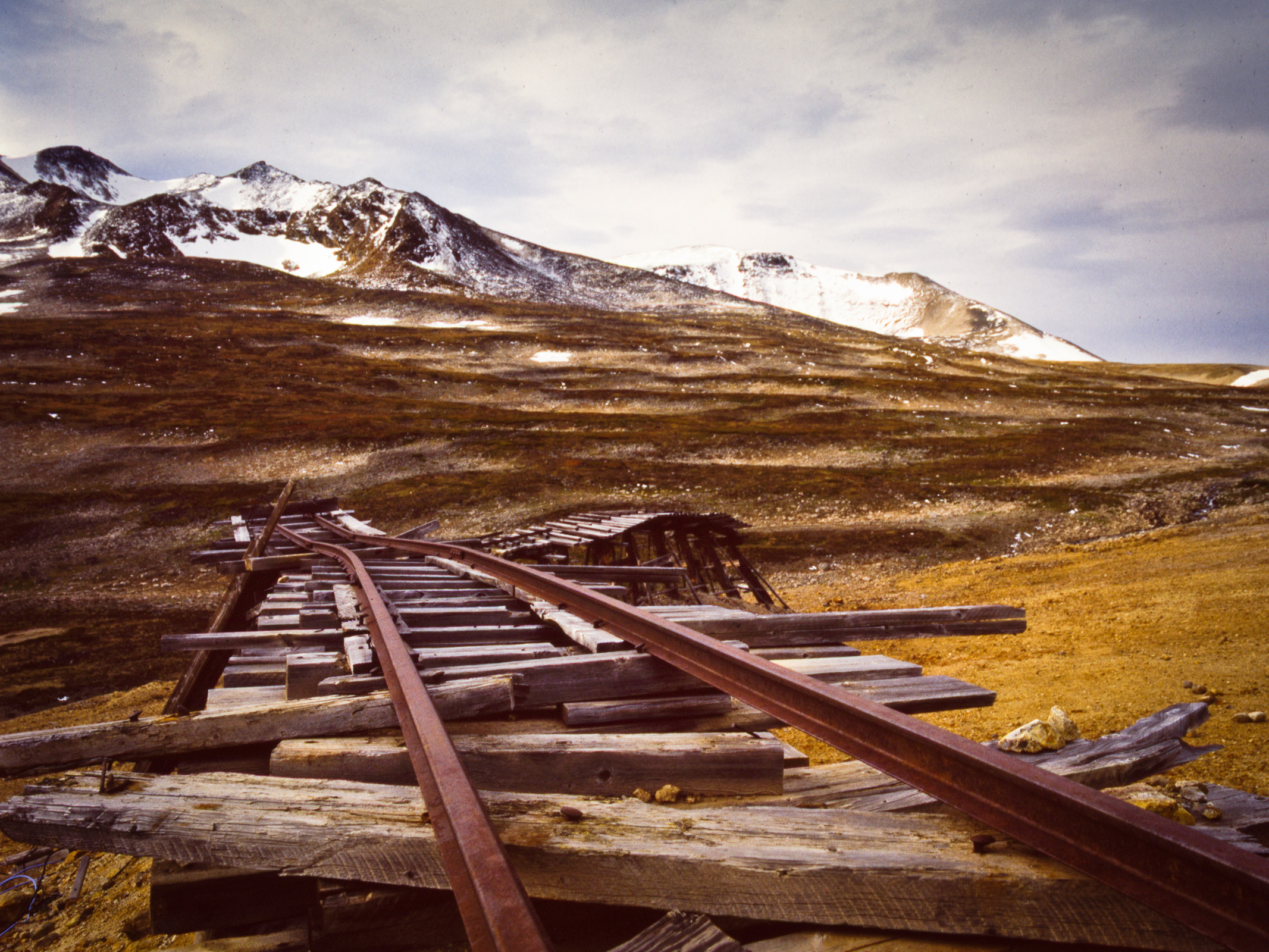
- View from "Big Thing Mine"

Highest point
- Elevation: 2,205 m (7,234 ft)
- Prominence: 923 m (3,028 ft)
- Listing: List of mountains of Canada
- Coordinates: 60°03′28.8″N 134°41′27.6″W

Geography
- Location within Yukon
- Location: Yukon, Canada
- Parent range: Boundary Ranges
- Topo map: NTS 105D2 Carcross

Geology
- Rock age: Late Cretaceous
- Mountain type: Stratovolcano

Montana Mountain is a deeply eroded Late Cretaceous stratovolcano located south of Carcross, Yukon, Canada. As well as its main peak, the mountain includes many sub-peaks and contains felsic pyroclastics and flows; typically altered and orange-weathering. Montana Mountain was formed when the ancient Kula Plate was subducting under southwestern Yukon during the Late Cretaceous period.

A flurry of quartz mining activity took place on Montana Mountain starting in 1899, peaking in 1905-1906 when American mining promoter John Conrad consolidated claims on Montana Mountain and built three tramways to carry the ore back down, including a 4-mile-long one from Windy Arm on Tagish Lake to the Mountain Hero mine.

Montana Mountain is also an important landmark for the Carcross/Tagish First Nations living in the area. According to legend, Montana Mountain is one of the peaks Game Mother used to hang a swing for her animal creations. On this swing each kind of animal danced and sang a different song. Following this "celebration" Game Mother gave each animal their characteristic attributes of today. In addition to its spiritual importance, the mountain was also an important source of food, medicines, and refuge.

During the early quartz mining period, an extensive network of trails were constructed on the mountain to connect the many silver claims with Carcross and/or Windy Arm. In 2005 the Carcross/Tagish First Nation took back the mountain in its land claim settlement and set out to restore some of the old trails and make them accessible for public use and enjoyment.

Through a programme called "SingleTrack to Success" an extensive network of mountain bike trails have been developed on the lower slopes of Montana Mountain. Additionally, these trails have been mapped and the maps are publicly available.

== See also ==
- Volcanology of Northern Canada
- List of volcanoes in Canada
