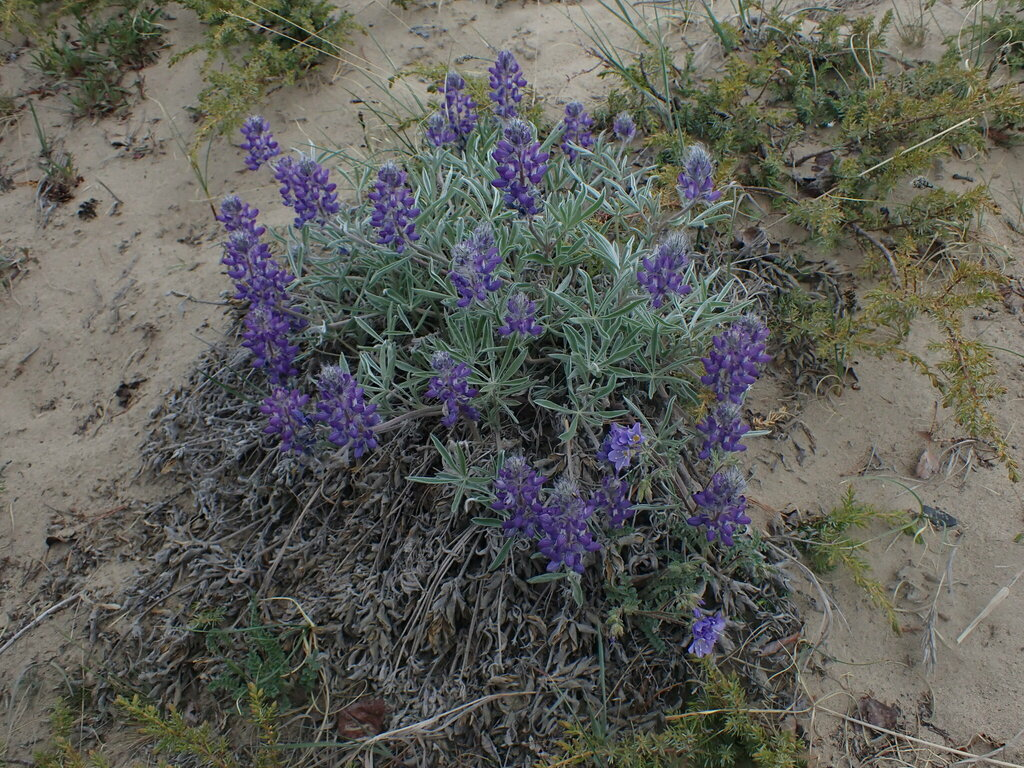

Conservation status
- Apparently Secure (NatureServe)

Scientific classification
- Kingdom: Plantae
- Clade: Tracheophytes
- Clade: Angiosperms
- Clade: Eudicots
- Clade: Rosids
- Order: Fabales
- Family: Fabaceae
- Subfamily: Faboideae
- Genus: Lupinus
- Species: L. kuschei

Binomial name
- Lupinus kuschei Eastw.

Synonyms
- Lupinus sericeus

= Lupinus kuschei =

Species of legume

Lupinus kuschei, the Yukon lupine, is a species of flowering plant from the order Fabales which can be found in Alaska and Western Canada.

== Description ==
The plant's stems are 15–50 centimetres (5.9–19.7 in) high while the leaves carry 5 to 9 leaflets with petioles being 4–15 centimetres (1.6–5.9 in) long. The leaflets themselves are elliptic and are 1.5–5 centimetres (0.59–1.97 in) long. Flowers have 3–10 centimetres (1.2–3.9 in) long racemes which have a two-lipped calyx. The upper lip of the calyx is 4–6 millimetres (0.16–0.24 in) long and the lower lip is 5–7 millimetres (0.20–0.28 in). L. kuschei have 10–13 millimetres (0.39–0.51 in) long corollas which are either blue or purple in colour. The fruits have 2–3 centimetres (0.79–1.18 in) long pods which carry seeds that are 4–6 centimetres (1.6–2.4 in) long. The flowers can be white, purple, blue, and violet. The flowers bloom in the months of June and July. The fruit type is a legume.

It can be distinguished from Lupinus nootkatensis by its long-petioled basal leaves and acute leaflets. It can be distinguished from Lupinus arcticus by its silky leaflets on both sides. It can be distinguished from Lupinus lepidus by its glabrous keels, and its stem, pedicels, and calyx with spreading, villous pubescence. It can be distinguished from Lupinus sericeus by its banners not being hairy on the back.

== Habitat and distribution ==
It can be found in the Conifer Forest and Sand dune habitat. Appears to prefer sandy and gravelly soil. Also found in sand bars of glacial rivers, river terraces, and sandy alluvium. It's often in mesic to dry, sandy, gravelly, or rocky openings, alpine fields, and on roadsides. Some associated species include, Dryas drummondii, Hedysarum mackenzii, Epilobium latifolium, Oxytropis campestris, Oxytropis deflexa, Pinus contorta, Arctostaphylos species, Shepherdia canadensis, Calamagrostis purpurascens, Festuca rubra, Solidago decumbens, Populus balsamifera, and Salix species.

Most of the population is found in the southwestern Yukon, with parts of its population in northern British Columbia and east-central Alaska. Disjunct populations have also been found in northwestern Alaska. The range extent can be up to 250,000 km^{2}, as the parts of northwestern Alaska have not been fully mapped yet. Some sources also think there could be a population in southern British Columbia, which hasn't been confirmed and these reports might be questionable. It is most commonly observed in the months of June and July. 75.1% of the time it was found in Canada, and 13.2% of the time it was found in the United States.
