= Bennett Lake Volcanic Complex =

Extinct caldera complex in British Columbia and Yukon, Canada

Coordinates: 60°01′29.04″N 135°19′33.14″W

Geography
- Location: British Columbia/Yukon, Canada
- Parent range: Boundary Ranges, Coast Mountains

Geology
- Rock age: 50 million years
- Mountain type: Caldera
- Last eruption: Eocene

The Bennett Lake Volcanic Complex (BLVC) is a huge 50-million-year-old extinct caldera complex that spans across the British Columbia-Yukon border in Canada. It is located near the western end of the West Arm of Bennett Lake. The caldera complex is surrounded by granitic rocks containing pendants.

It is located near the eastern contact of the Coast Plutonic Complex and the Whitehorse Trough. There are thick series of pyroclastic and epiclastic rocks at the caldera. Remnants of this huge caldera complex are preserved near Bennett Lake in the Coast Mountains. The complex compose the Skukum Group.

== Formation and eruptive history ==
The Bennett Lake Volcanic Complex was formed when the ancient Kula Plate was subducting under North America during the early Eocene period. Cataclysmic eruptions from the Bennett Lake Volcanic Complex were from vents along arcuate fracture systems that ejected out about 850 km^{3} (200 mi^{3}) of glowing avalanches of pyroclastic rock called pyroclastic flows. Evacuation of the underlying magma chamber was followed by several stages of collapse to form two calderas, one nested inside the other, that produced an elliptical depression 19 km (12 mi) by 30 km (19 mi) across. The calderas were from 200 m (656 ft) to 2,700 m (8,858 ft) deep. Volcanism continued for some time after the caldera collapse. High level andesite and rhyolite dikes and intrusive bodies crosscut volcanic flows and tuffs at all levels. Dike swarms are emplaced along ring fractures and fault zones at the southwest edge of the caldera. Near the dying stages of the volcano, magma surged upward and arched the roof of the magma chamber into a broad dome with relief of about 1,500 m (4,921 ft).

== See also ==
- List of known large volcanic eruptions
- List of volcanoes in Canada
- Timeline of volcanism on Earth
- Volcanism of Canada
- Volcanism of Northern Canada
- Volcanism of Western Canada
