= Nares Lake =

Lake in Yukon, Canada

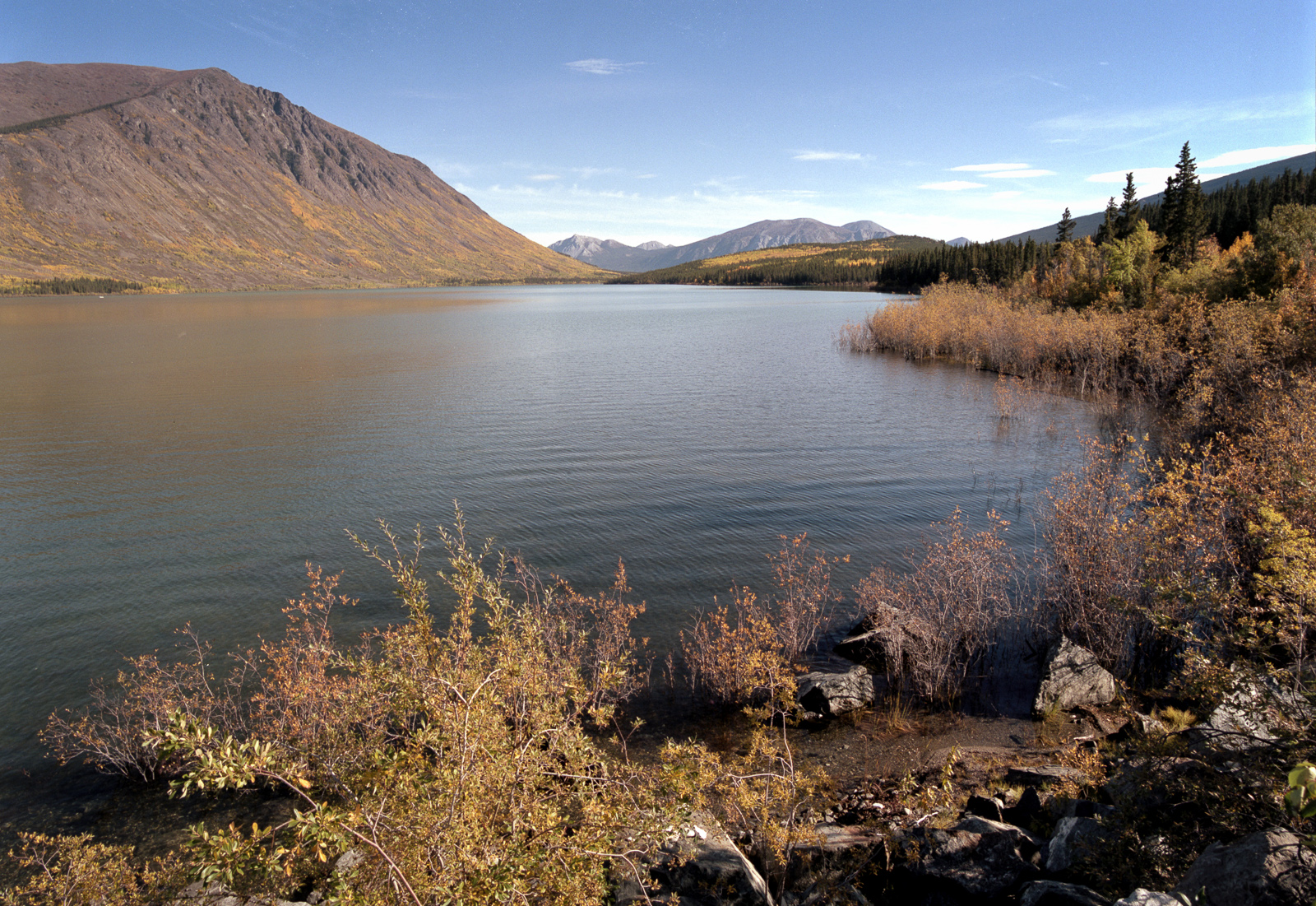
- Nares Lake in October 2014

- Location within Yukon
- Location: Yukon
- Coordinates: 60°09′48″N 134°39′45″W
- Basin countries: Canada
- Max. length: 5 kilometres (3.1 mi)
- Max. width: 1.5 kilometres (0.93 mi)
- Surface area: 107.15 km^{2} (41.37 sq mi)

Nares Lake is a 107.15 km^{2} (41.37 sq mi) lake in the southern Yukon between Bennett Lake and Tagish Lake that lies below Nares Mountain. Nares Lake is in fact an arm of Tagish Lake. The community of Carcross is on the Nares Narrows between Bennett and Tagish Lake, along the Klondike Highway. The primary inflow to and outflow from the lake is the Nares River. Both the river and the lake are named after Admiral George Nares.
