= Carcross =

Carcross Nadashaa Héeni Caribou Crossing
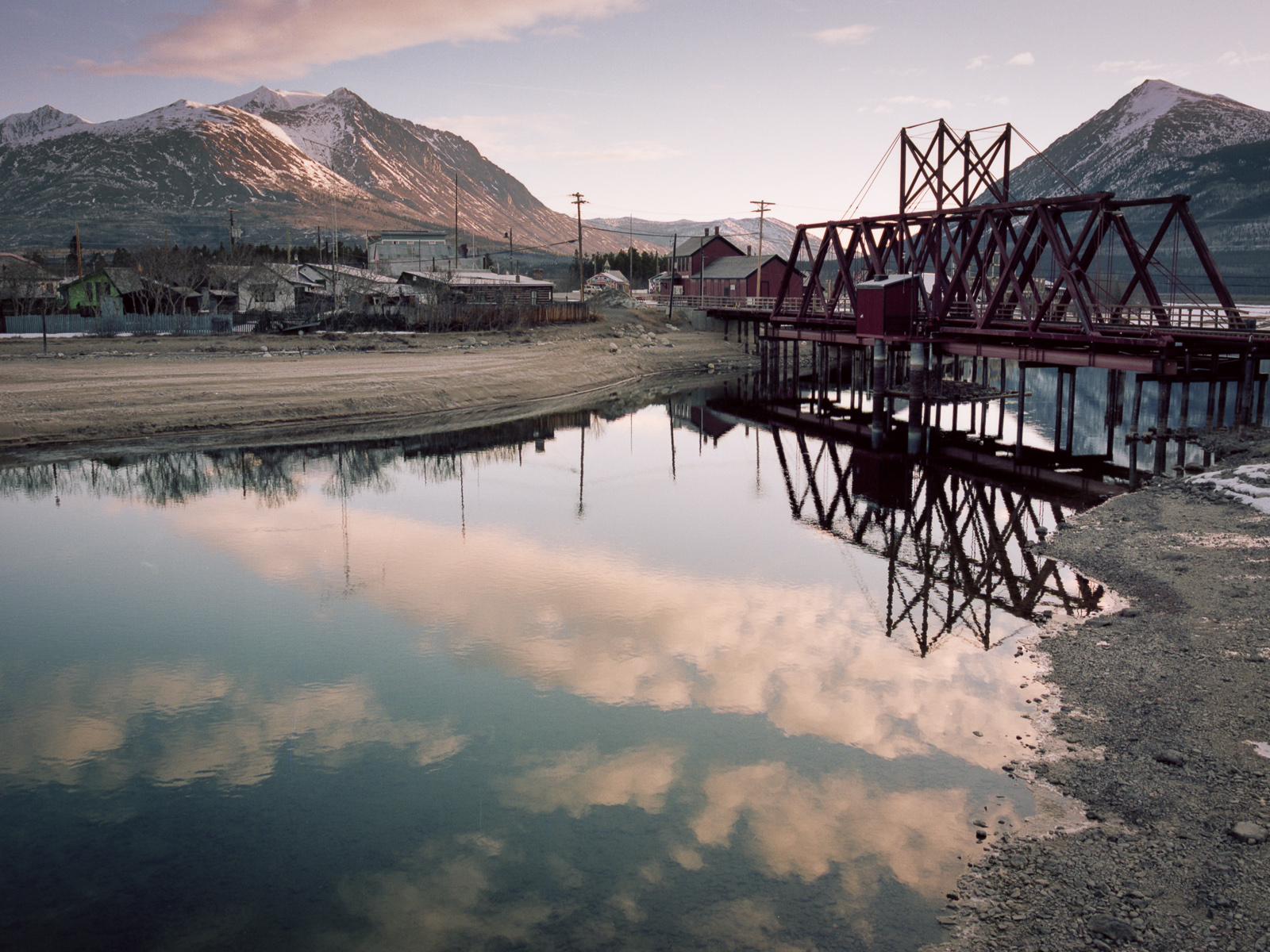
- Carcross, Yukon

- Location within Yukon Location within Canada
- Coordinates: 60°10′03″N 134°42′26″W
- Country: Canada
- Territory: Yukon

Area
  - Land: 16.14 km^{2} (6.23 sq mi)
- Elevation: 659 m (2,161 ft)

Population (2016)
  - Total: 301
  - Density: 18.7/km^{2} (48/sq mi)
  - Change 2011-16: ▲4.2%
- Time zone: UTC−07:00 (MST)

Carcross, originally known as Caribou Crossing, (Tlingit: Nadashaa Héeni) is an unincorporated community in Yukon, Canada, on Bennett Lake and Nares Lake. It is home to the Carcross/Tagish First Nation.

It is 74 km (46 mi) south-southeast by the Alaska Highway and the Klondike Highway from Whitehorse. The south end of the Tagish Road is in Carcross. Carcross is also on the White Pass and Yukon Route railway.

Carcross is well known for its world class mountain biking on the near-by Montana Mountain, and for the nearby Carcross Desert, often referred to as the "world's smallest desert."

== History ==
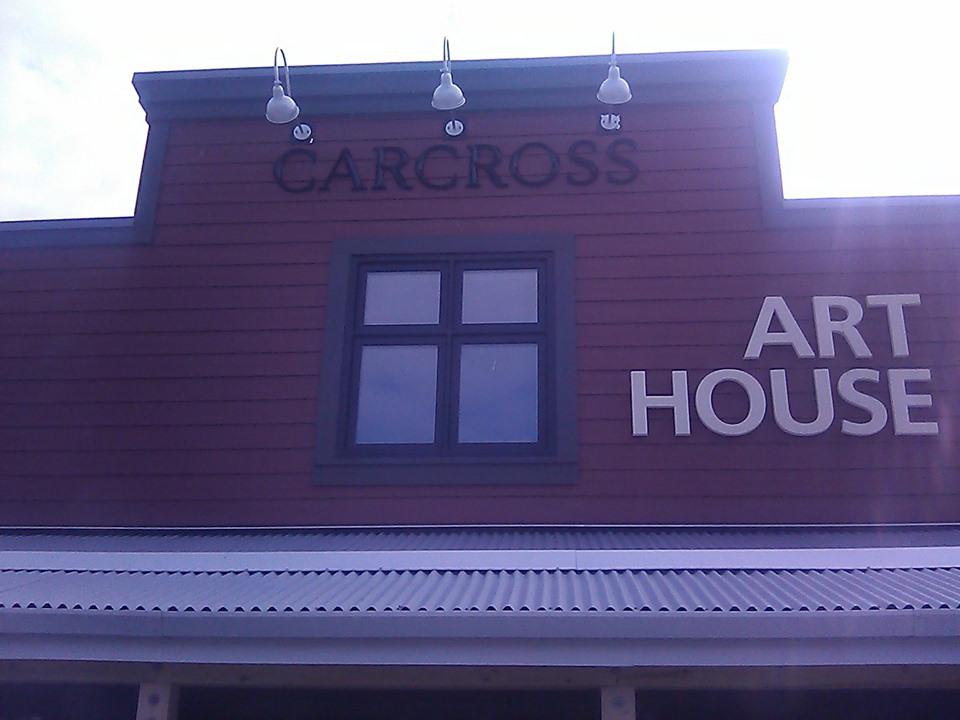
The Carcross Art House

Caribou Crossing was a fishing and hunting camp for Inland Tlingit and Tagish people. 4,500-year-old artifacts from First Nations people living in the area have been found in the region.

Originally known as Naataase Heen (Tagish for ‘water running through the narrows’), Caribou Crossing was named after the migration of huge numbers of caribou across the natural land bridge between Lake Bennett and Nares Lake. That caribou herd was decimated during the Klondike Gold Rush, but a recovery program raised the number of animals to about 450. The modern village began in 1896, during the Klondike Gold Rush. At the time, Caribou Crossing was a popular stopping place for prospectors going to and from the gold fields of Dawson City.

Caribou Crossing was also a station for the Royal Mail and the Dominion Telegraph Line, and it served as a communications point on the Yukon River.

In 1904, Caribou Crossing was renamed Carcross as a result of some mail mix-ups with the Cariboo Regional District in nearby British Columbia.

Silver mining was promoted nearby in Conrad, Yukon in the early 1900s, but there was little to be found and mining efforts soon ended. Mineral exploration continues today, but tourism is far more important to the economy of the community.

In 2016, Prince William, Duke of Cambridge and Catherine, Duchess of Cambridge visited Carcross for a day trip.

== Demographics ==
Carcross (settlement)

Federal census population history of Carcross
Year	Pop.	±%
1941	162	—
1951	182	+12.3%
1981	218	+19.8%
1986	209	−4.1%
1991	183	−12.4%
1996	196	+7.1%
2001	152	−22.4%
2006	280	+84.2%
2011	289	+3.2%
2016	301	+4.2%
2021	317	+5.3%
Source: Statistics Canada

In the 2021 Census of Population conducted by Statistics Canada, Carcross had a population of 317 living in 168 of its 229 total private dwellings, a change of 5.3% from its 2016 population of 301. With a land area of 15.56 km^{2} (6.01 sq mi), it had a population density of 20.4/km^{2} (52.8/sq mi) in 2021.

Carcross 4 (self-government)

In the 2021 Census of Population conducted by Statistics Canada, Carcross 4 had a population of 37 living in 16 of its 16 total private dwellings, a change of 5.7% from its 2016 population of 35. With a land area of 0.58 km^{2} (0.22 sq mi), it had a population density of 63.8/km^{2} (165.2/sq mi) in 2021.

== Climate ==
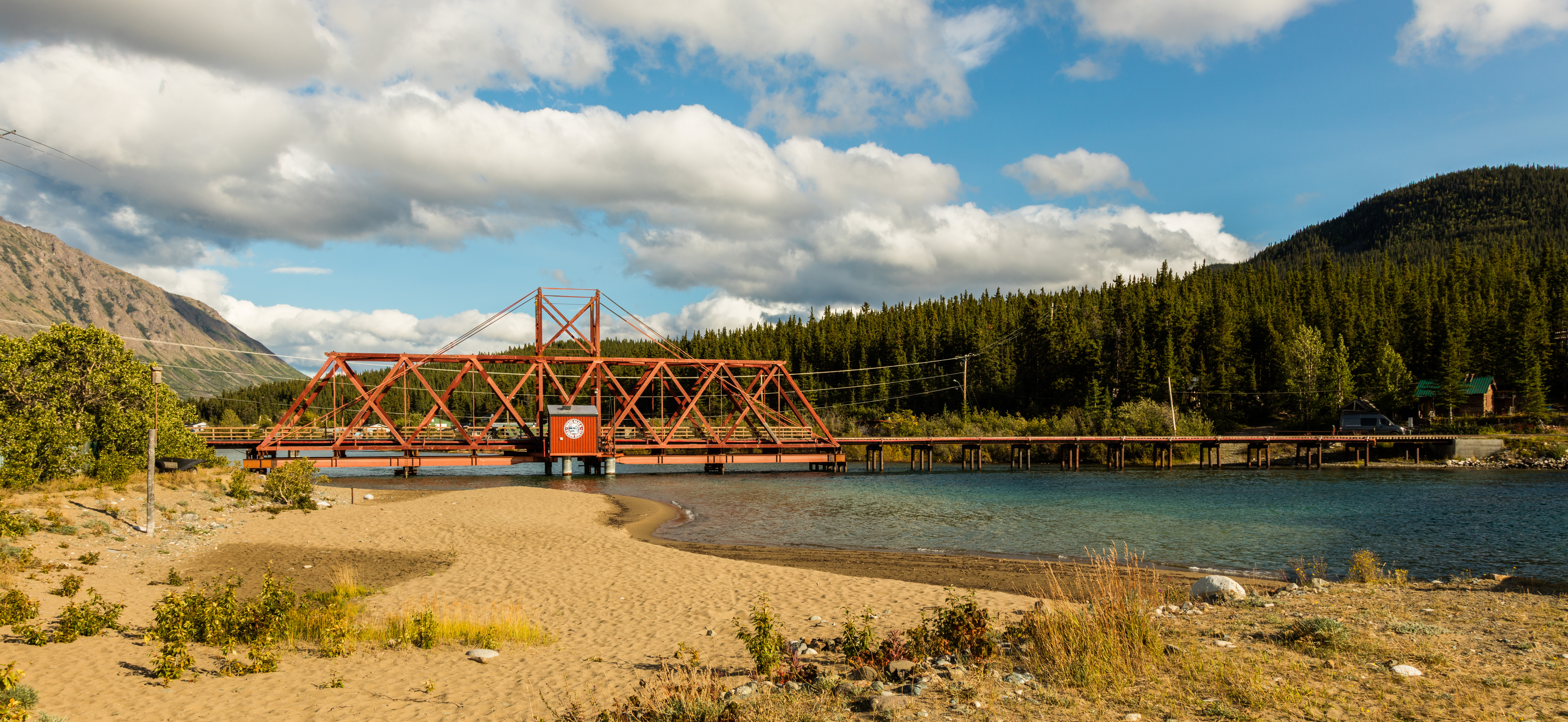
Caribou crossing bridge in Carcross

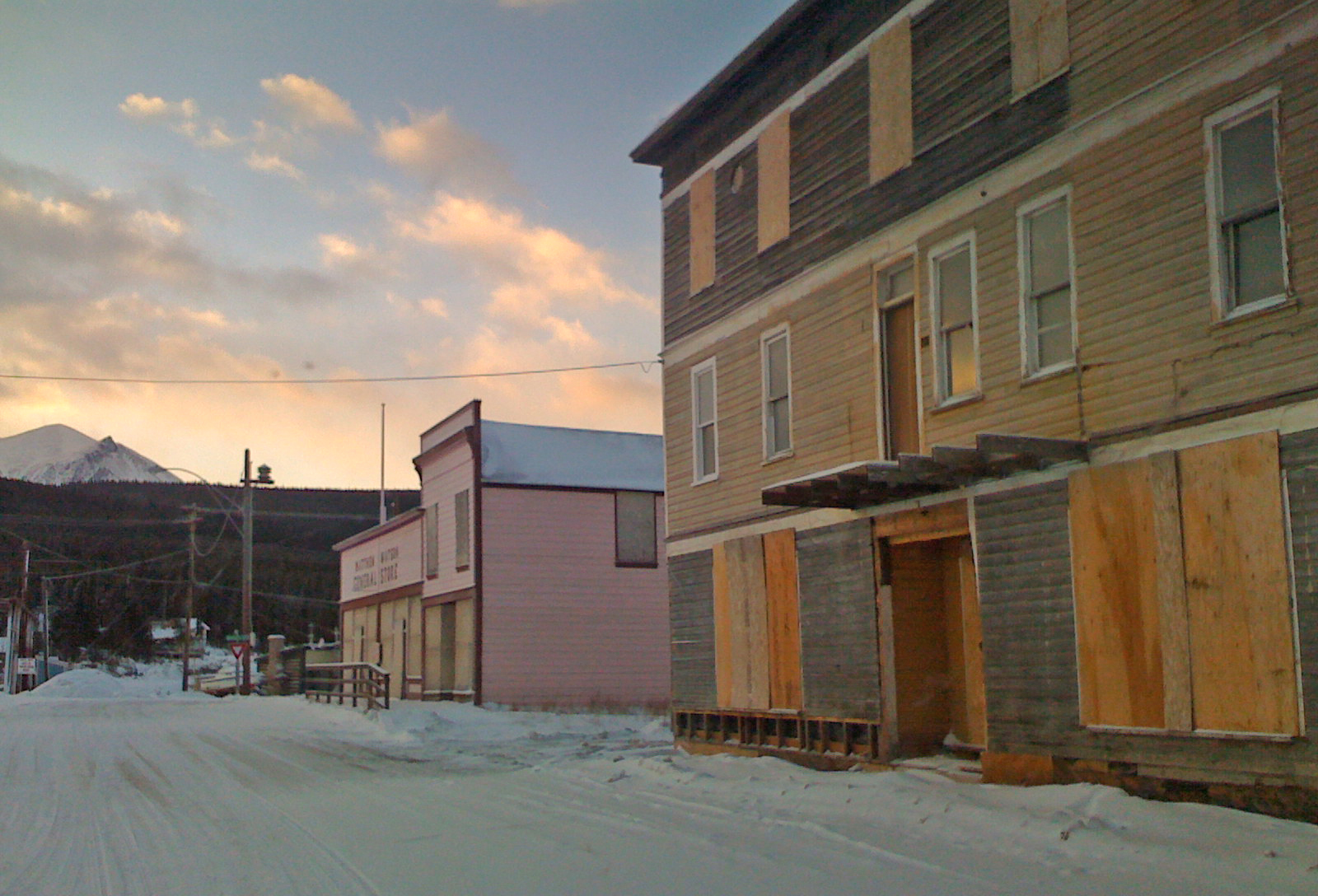
In winter, many businesses in Carcross close due to a lack of tourism.

Carcross has a dry-summer subarctic climate (Köppen climate classification: Dsc), typical of this part of the Yukon.

Summer days are mild to warm with crisp, cool nights due to low humidity during summers. Winters are cold by Canadian standards, but not so much by Yukon standards. Annual snowfall averages 50 inches (127 cm) with peak snowpack reaching 16 inches (40.6 cm) during March.

Carcross has one of the lowest amounts of precipitation days out of anywhere in Canada, only having 76 precipitation days, with the rainiest month September only averaging 9 days with precipitation, and the driest month April only averaging 2 days with precipitation.

Climate data for Carcross
Month	Jan	Feb	Mar	Apr	May	Jun	Jul	Aug	Sep	Oct	Nov	Dec	Year
Record high °C (°F)	8.9 (48.0)	18.9 (66.0)	13.5 (56.3)	21.0 (69.8)	28.0 (82.4)	31.7 (89.1)	32.5 (90.5)	31.7 (89.1)	26.7 (80.1)	20.0 (68.0)	13.3 (55.9)	14.0 (57.2)	32.5 (90.5)
Mean daily maximum °C (°F)	−13.2 (8.2)	−7.8 (18.0)	−0.6 (30.9)	7.3 (45.1)	12.0 (53.6)	17.0 (62.6)	21.7 (71.1)	20.6 (69.1)	13.5 (56.3)	5.6 (42.1)	−3.7 (25.3)	−7.3 (18.9)	3.6 (38.5)
Daily mean °C (°F)	−18.2 (−0.8)	−13.9 (7.0)	−7.8 (18.0)	−0.7 (30.7)	5.6 (42.1)	10.6 (51.1)	14.2 (57.6)	13.0 (55.4)	7.9 (46.2)	1.1 (34.0)	−7.7 (18.1)	−11.6 (11.1)	−2.4 (27.7)
Mean daily minimum °C (°F)	−22.7 (−8.9)	−20.0 (−4.0)	−14.8 (5.4)	−8.4 (16.9)	0.0 (32.0)	4.0 (39.2)	6.7 (44.1)	5.1 (41.2)	2.3 (36.1)	−3.4 (25.9)	−11.4 (11.5)	−15.7 (3.7)	−8.2 (17.2)
Record low °C (°F)	−51.2 (−60.2)	−48.3 (−54.9)	−42.2 (−44.0)	−32.8 (−27.0)	−12.5 (9.5)	−6.7 (19.9)	−3.3 (26.1)	−11.7 (10.9)	−18.0 (−0.4)	−30.0 (−22.0)	−40.0 (−40.0)	−55.0 (−67.0)	−55.0 (−67.0)
Average precipitation mm (inches)	28.6 (1.13)	23.4 (0.92)	9.6 (0.38)	5.5 (0.22)	14.9 (0.59)	28.5 (1.12)	29.9 (1.18)	28.1 (1.11)	32.9 (1.30)	27.0 (1.06)	28.9 (1.14)	22.5 (0.89)	279.8 (11.02)
Average rainfall mm (inches)	0.5 (0.02)	0.0 (0.0)	0.2 (0.01)	1.5 (0.06)	14.8 (0.58)	28.5 (1.12)	29.9 (1.18)	28.0 (1.10)	30.1 (1.19)	17.1 (0.67)	1.4 (0.06)	0.2 (0.01)	152.2 (5.99)
Average snowfall cm (inches)	28.1 (11.1)	23.4 (9.2)	9.4 (3.7)	4.0 (1.6)	0.1 (0.0)	0.0 (0.0)	0.0 (0.0)	0.1 (0.0)	2.8 (1.1)	9.9 (3.9)	27.4 (10.8)	22.4 (8.8)	127.6 (50.2)
Average precipitation days (≥ 0.2 mm)	7.5	6.0	3.5	2.1	4.7	6.4	8.1	7.4	9.0	7.9	7.3	6.5	76.3
Average rainy days (≥ 0.2 mm)	0.2	0.0	0.1	0.6	4.8	6.4	8.1	7.4	8.5	5.0	0.4	0.1	41.7
Average snowy days (≥ 0.2 cm)	7.3	6.0	3.4	1.5	0.1	0.0	0.0	0.0	0.7	3.5	7.1	6.5	35.9
Source: 1981-2010 Environment Canada, Source 2: May and June temp. averages

== Economy ==
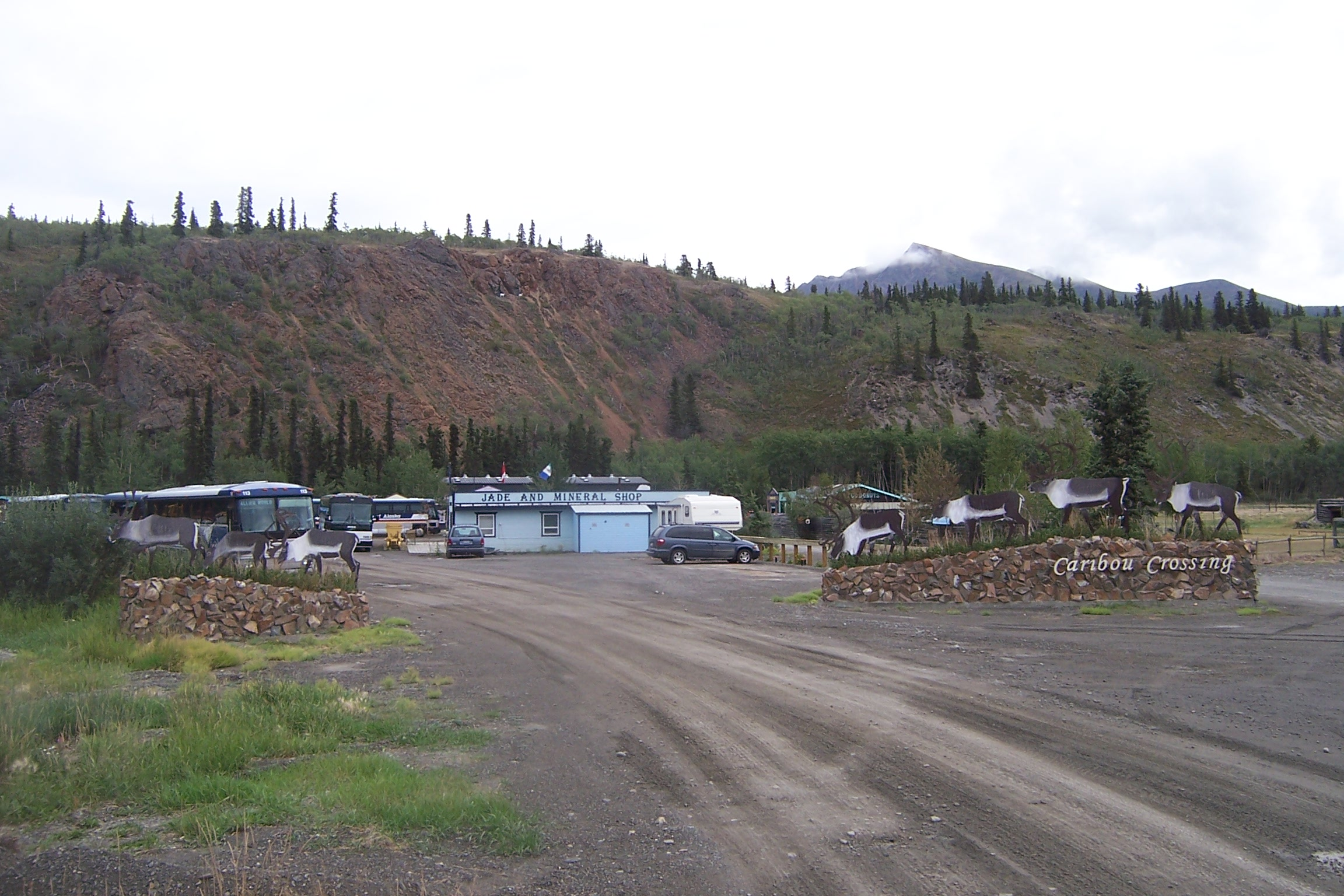
Tour buses at a large tourist stop in Carcross

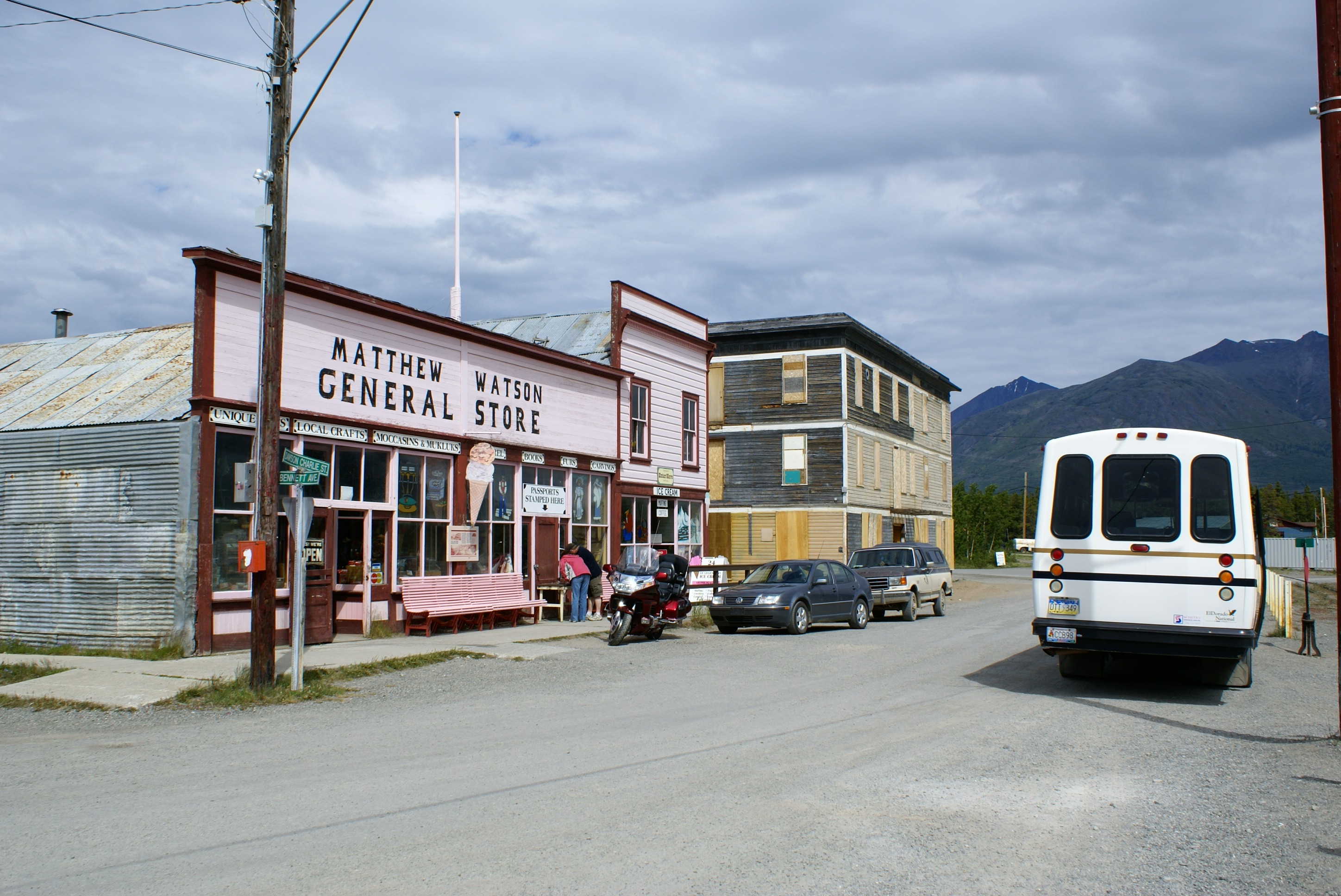
"Downtown" Carcross

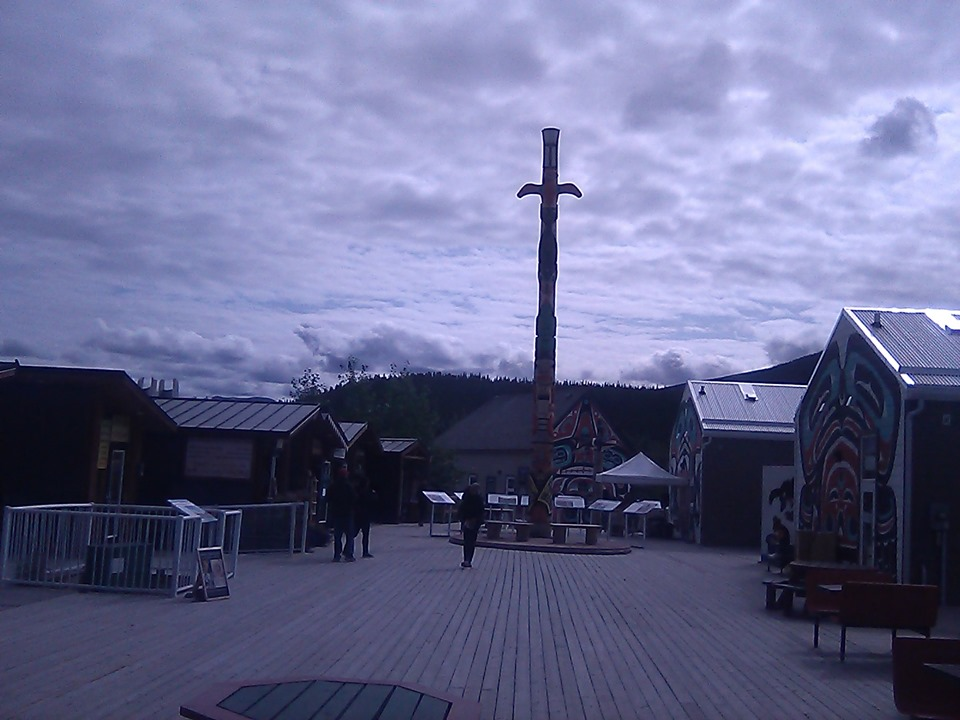
Large totem pole in the Carcross Commons.

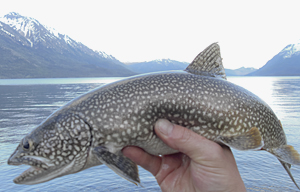
Lake trout, tutshi lake, carcross, Yukon, Canada

Carcross relies on tourism to support the local economy. It lies on the Klondike Highway between Whitehorse and Skagway, Alaska and offers a variety of historic attractions and outdoor activities. Popular with road traffic including tour buses and RVs, in 2007 the White Pass railway also resumed service to Carcross railway station.

Just north of the town is the Carcross Desert, often referred to as the "world's smallest desert." There are two small airports located in the area: Carcross Airport is adjacent to the town and Carcross Water Aerodrome located on Tagish Lake.

Alaska cruises stopping in Skagway will offer day tours to Carcross. The day tours offer stops at the Yukon sign, the Caribou Crossing Wildlife Museum, Dog Sledding Zoo and the actual town of Carcross.

== Transportation ==
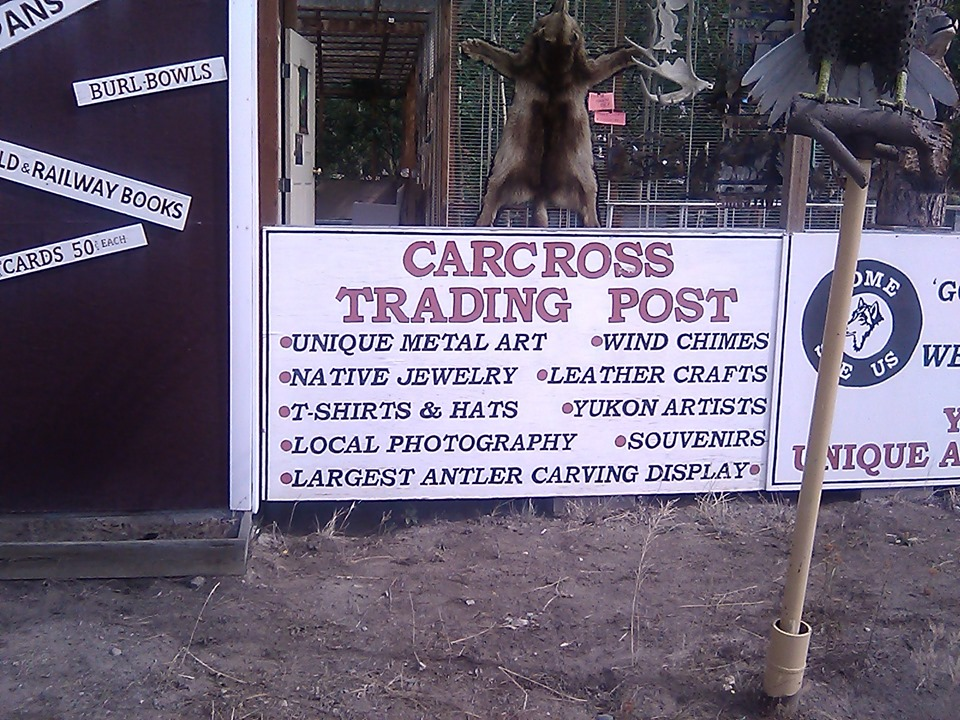
The Carcross Trading post.

Carcross lies on the popular Klondike Highway.

The city is served by Carcross Airport, which has no scheduled commercial flights. The closest Canadian airport with large airline service is Whitehorse Airport, which has domestic airline service as well as flights to Europe and the United States. Tourist buses serving cruise ships passengers at the port of Skagway, Alaska, USA make day trips to Carcross.

The White Pass and Yukon Route currently terminates in Carcross, as tracks further north to Whitehorse have not been restored.

== Notable people ==
- Louise Profeit-LeBlanc
- Keish (Skookum Jim)
- Angela Sidney
- Kevin Barr

== Media ==
- FM 90.5 - VF2039, First Nations community radio
- FM 97.5 - CIKO, school radio
- FM 105.5 - VF2360, TIS/weather

== Culture ==
In 2016, the Yukon Arts Centre opened an art gallery called the Art House and storefront in Carcross, in partnership with the Tagish First Nation.
