= Skukum Group =

Coordinates: 60°N 134°W

The Skukum Group is a 55-million-year-old volcanic group in northern British Columbia and southern Yukon, Canada, approximately 140 km^{2} in size. The group is encircled by the Watson and Wheaton rivers. It is part of the larger Sloko Volcanic Province, which encompasses part of southern Yukon and Alaska as well as northwestern British Columbia, ending around the Stikine River. Andesite of the Skukum Group hosts the Mount Skukum gold deposit southwest of Whitehorse.

== See also ==
- Volcanism of Canada
- Volcanism of Western Canada
- List of volcanoes in Canada
- Skookum
