= Bennett Lake =

Lake in Yukon Territory, Canada

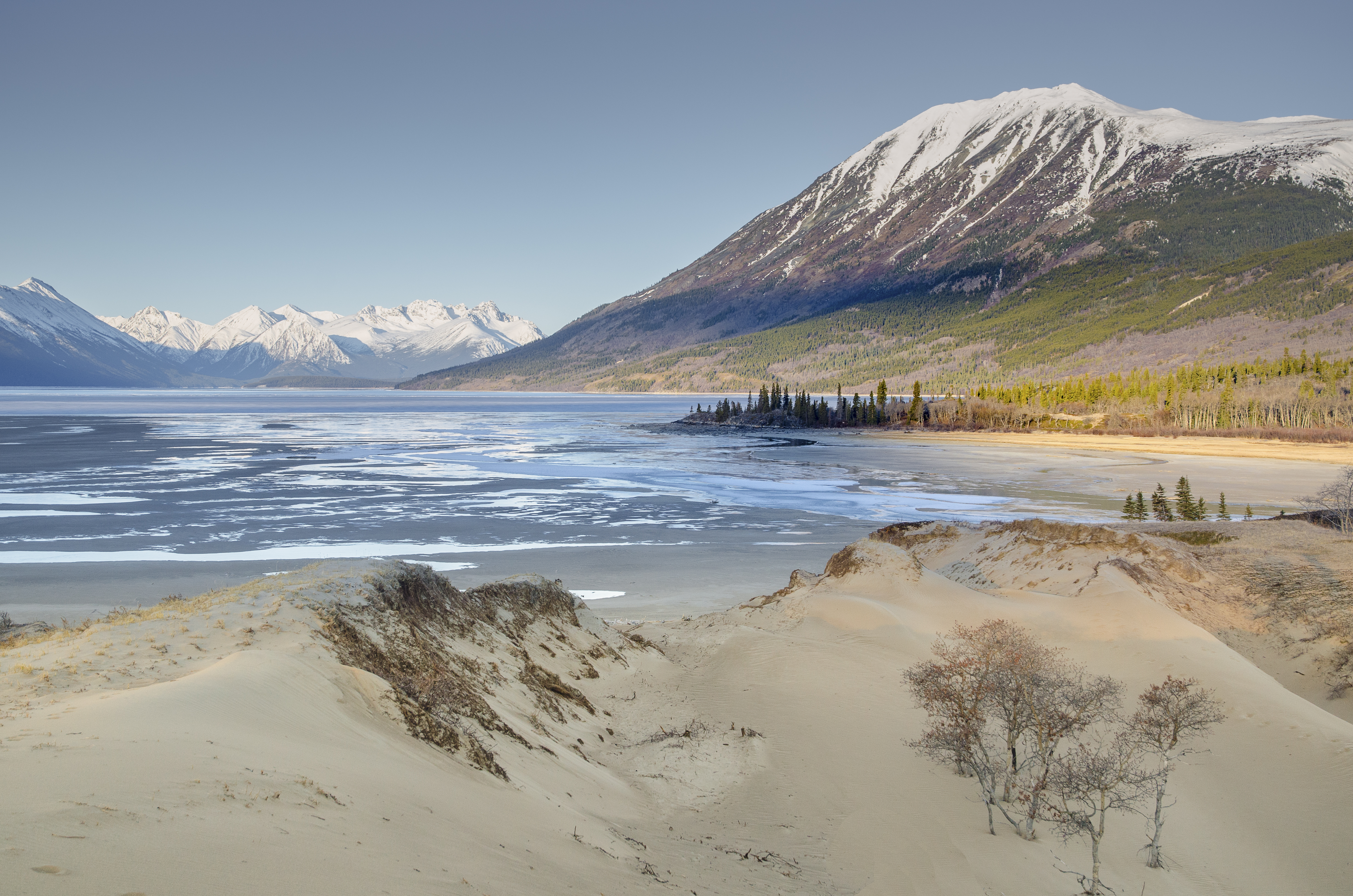
- Bennett Lake and a part of the Carcross Desert after sunrise

- Location in Yukon
- Location: British Columbia, Yukon
- Coordinates: 60°05′30″N 134°51′56″W
- Part of: Bering Sea drainage basin
- Primary inflows: Watson River, Wheaton River, Partridge River, Homan River
- Primary outflows: Nares River
- Basin countries: Canada
- Max. length: 41 km (25 mi)
- Max. width: 3.7 km (2.3 mi)
- Surface area: 90.68 or 96.8 km (56.35 or 60.15 mi)
- Average depth: 61.9 m (203 ft)
- Max. depth: 123 m (404 ft)
- Surface elevation: 656 m (2,152 ft)
- Islands: Bennett Lake

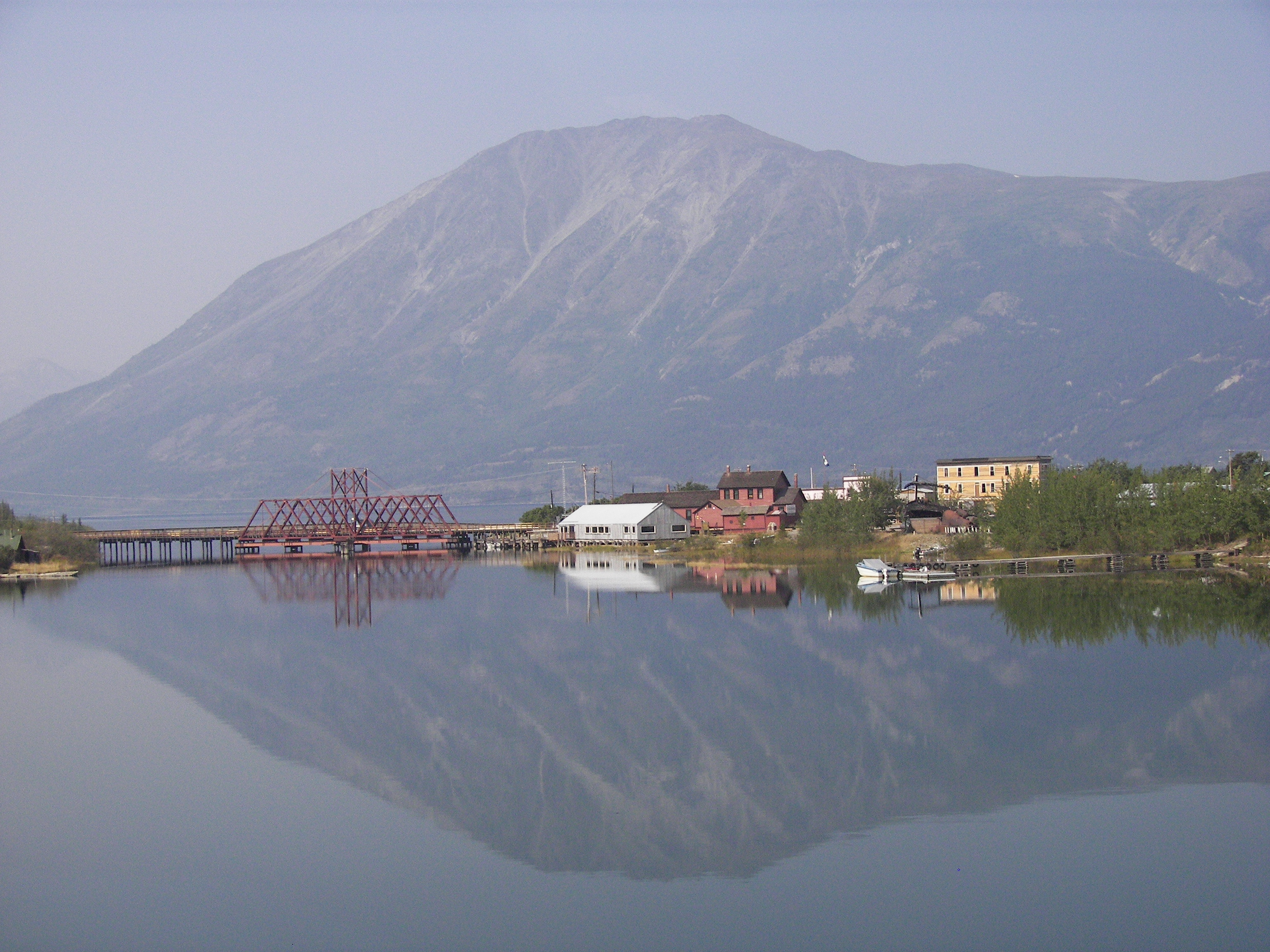
The White Pass and Yukon Route rail bridge over the strait between Bennett Lake and Nares Lake in Carcross, Yukon. Mount Gray is in the background.

Bennett Lake is a lake in the Province of British Columbia and Yukon Territory in northwestern Canada, at an elevation of 656 m (2,152 ft). It is just north of the border with the United States state of Alaska, near the Alaskan port of Skagway. The lake has an estimated area of about 90.68 or 96.8 km^{2} (35.01 or 37.37 sq mi) (sources differ). The average depth is 61.9 m (203 ft) and the maximum depth is 123 m (404 ft).

The narrow-gauge White Pass and Yukon Route Railroad connects the community of Bennett at the south end of the lake with Skagway further south and Whitehorse, Yukon on the north. It runs between Skagway and Fraser, British Columbia during the summer months.

The abandoned town of Bennett, British Columbia, historically usually referred to as Lake Bennett or Bennett Lake and the town of Carcross, Yukon are on the shores of Bennett Lake.

== History ==
During the Klondike Gold Rush, Bennett Lake was where the gold-seekers who had crossed the Coast Mountains from Skagway or Dyea, carrying their goods over the Chilkoot Trail or the White Pass, purchased or built rafts to float down the Yukon River to the gold fields at Dawson City, Yukon, Canada. A large tent city sprang up on its shores, numbering in the thousands and offering all the services of a major city.

In late May 1898, the North-West Mounted Police counted 778 boats under construction at Lindeman Lake (located a difficult portage above Bennett Lake), 850 in Bennett and the surrounding area, and another 198 at Caribou Crossing (now Carcross) and Tagish Lake to help transport thousands of goldfield-bound travellers. It was further estimated that another 1,200 boats were built in these areas over the next few weeks.

== Name origin ==
Named in 1883 by Frederick Schwatka, US Army officer and explorer, after James Gordon Bennett Jr (1841–1918), editor of the New York Herald, who was sponsor of Schwatchka's search for the remains of the Franklin Expedition, 1878-81.

== Hydrology ==
The main outflow of the lake is the Nares River, which flows to Nares Lake. Nares Lake empties into Tagish Lake; then via the Tagish River to Marsh Lake, the source of the Yukon River, which flows to the Bering Sea.

=== Inflows ===
Counter clockwise from Nares River outflow

- Watson River
- Wheaton River
- Millhaven Creek
- Dry Creek
- MacAuley Creek
- Partridge River
- Latreille Creek
- Homan River
- Lindeman Creek
- Dundalk Creek
- Knob Creek
- McDonald Creek

== Historical image gallery ==
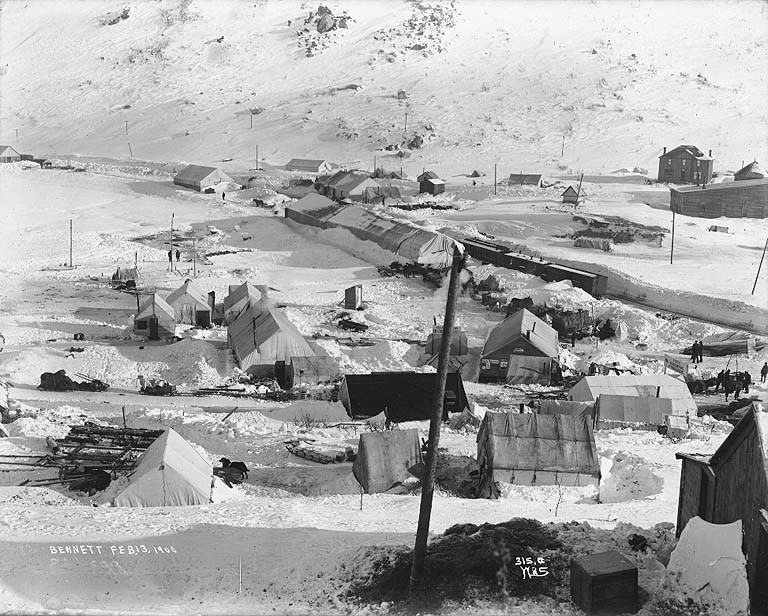
White Pass & Yukon Route train passing through Bennett on February 13, 1900

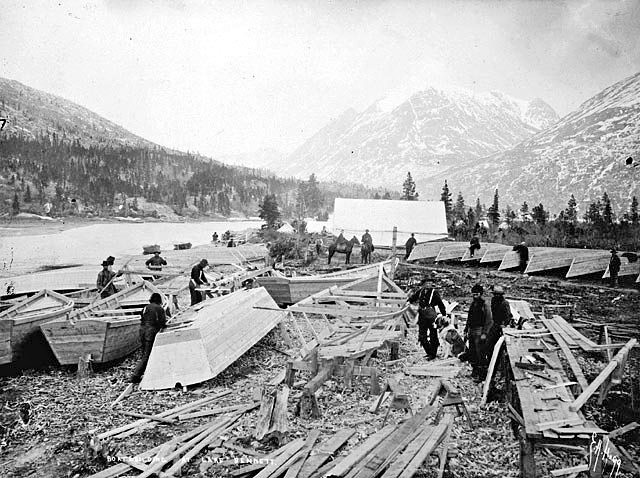
Photograph of boat building on the lake during the Klondike Gold Rush by Eric A. Hegg

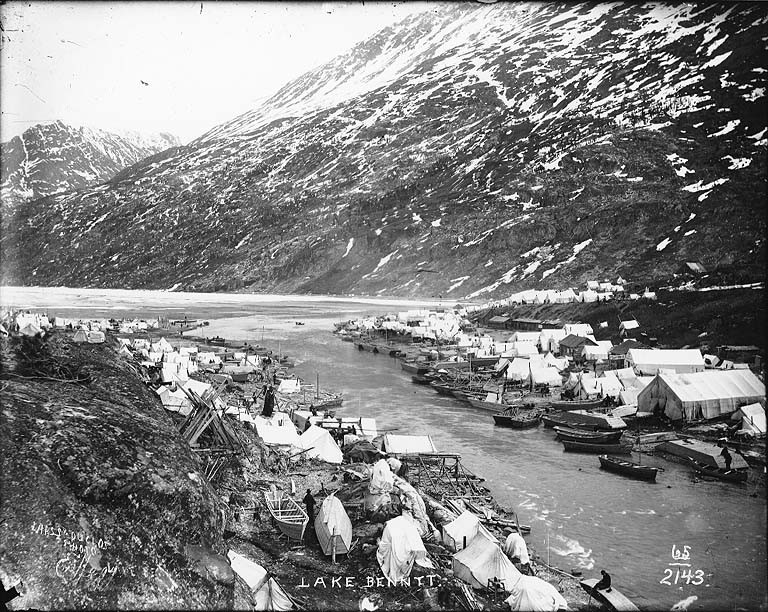
Photograph of tent city of Bennett along One Mile River and Lake Bennett by Eric A. Hegg ca. 1898

== See also ==
- List of lakes of British Columbia
- Bennett Lake Volcanic Complex
- Bennett Range
