= Tagish Lake =

Lake in British Columbia and Yukon in Canada

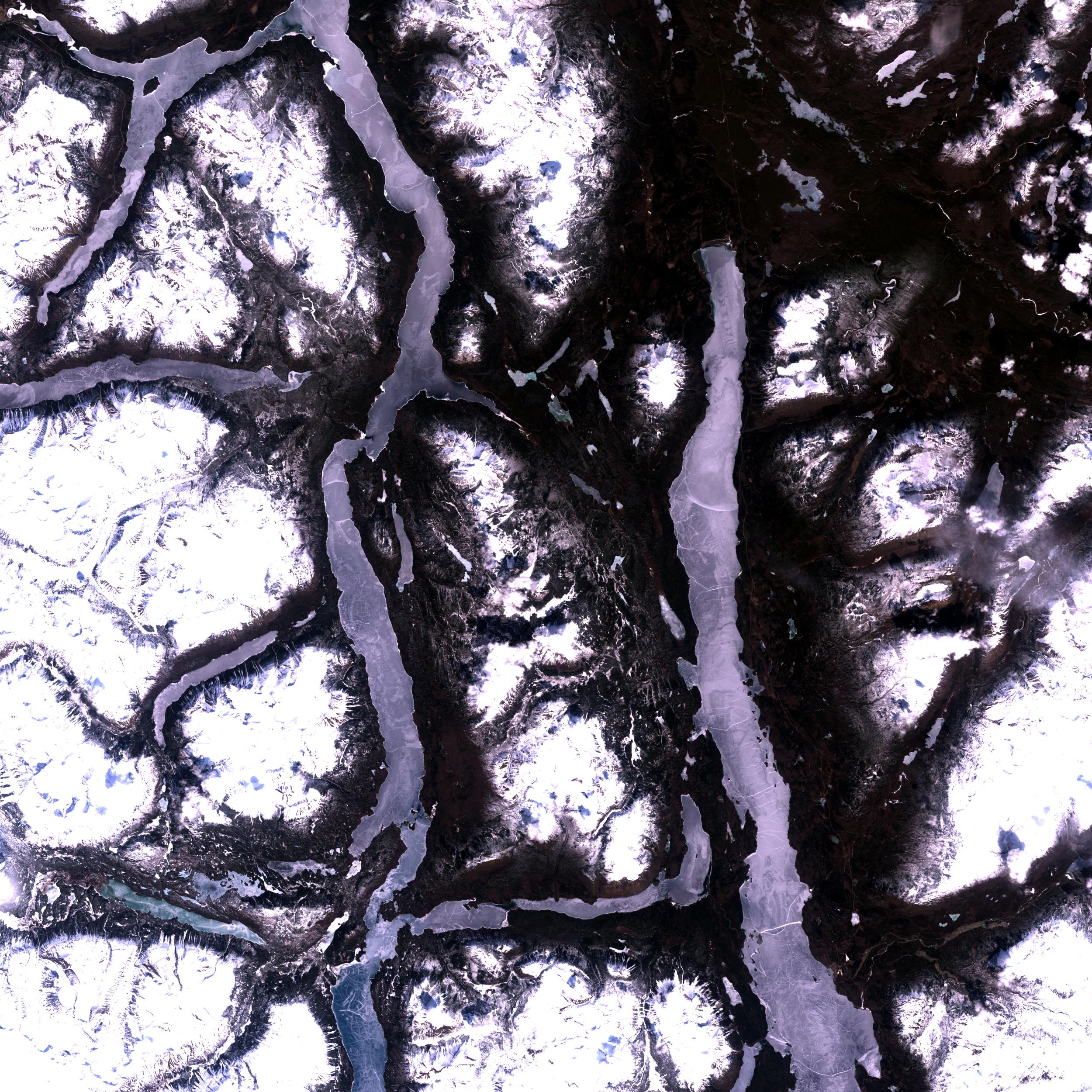
- A portion of Tagish Lake (on the left half of the image) during the Winter, as seen from space. Windy Arm is in the upper left corner, while the Taku Arm is on the right centre. The lake seen on the right half of the image is Atlin Lake.

- Location within Yukon
- Location: Yukon, British Columbia
- Coordinates: 60°00′N 134°15′W
- Primary inflows: Wann River, Swanson River, Fantail River, Tutshi River
- Catchment area: 5,340 km^{2} (2,062 sq mi)
- Basin countries: Canada
- Max. length: 119 km (74 mi)
- Max. width: 3.2 km (2 mi)
- Surface area: 354.48 km^{2} (136.87 sq mi)
- Average depth: 62 m (203 ft)
- Max. depth: 307 m (1,007 ft)
- Water volume: 21.98 km^{3} (5.27 cu mi)
- Surface elevation: 662 m (2,172 ft)

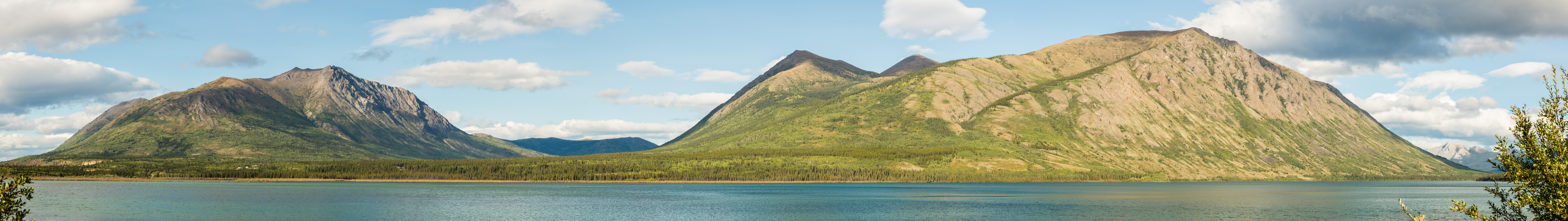
Tagish Lake.

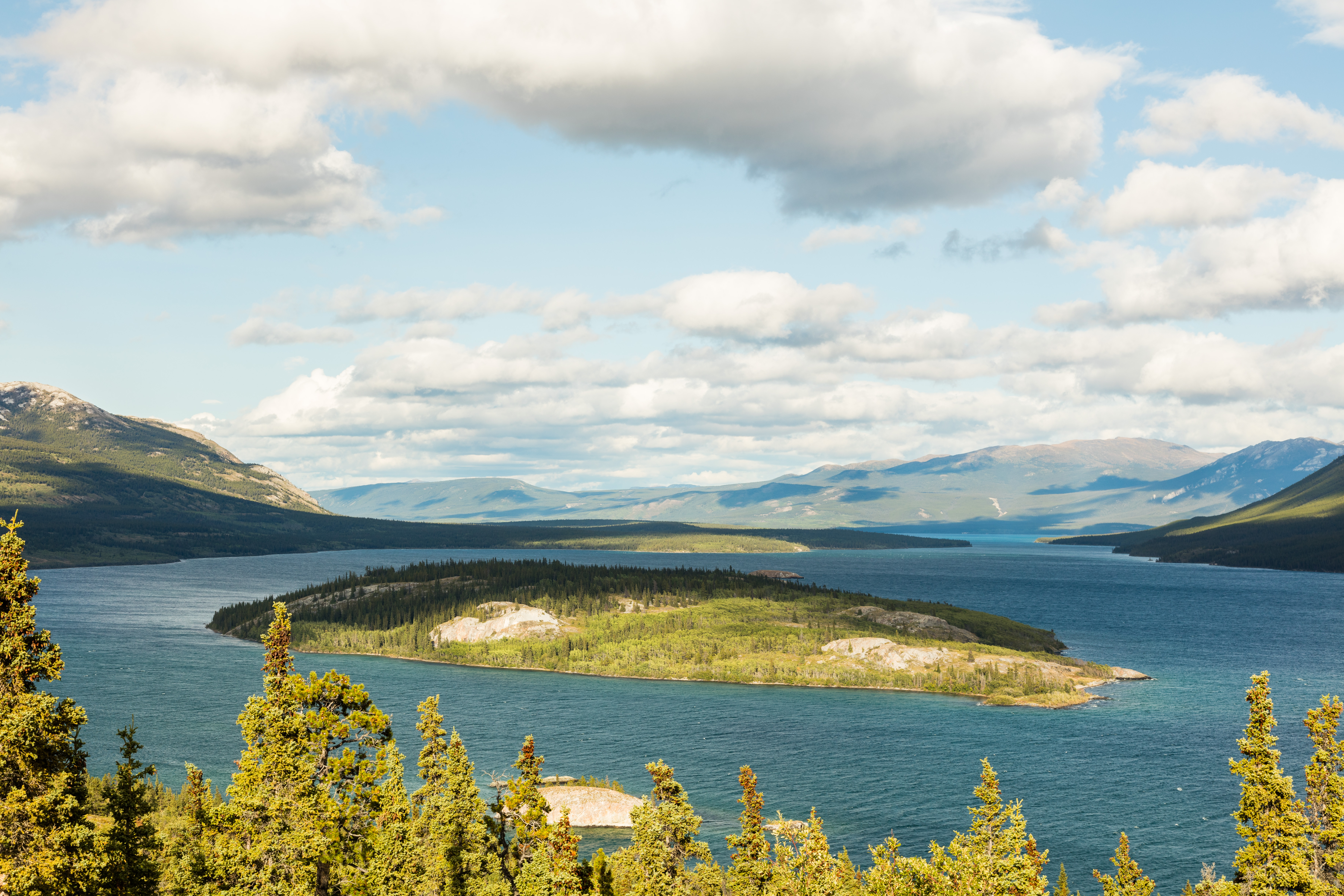
Bove Island on the Tagish Lake.

Tagish Lake is a lake in Yukon and northern British Columbia, Canada. The lake is 119 kilometres (74 mi) long and averages 3.2 km (2 mi) wide with an area of 354.48 km^{2} (136.87 sq mi), about two thirds of which is in British Columbia. The average depth is 62 m (203 ft) and maximum depth is 307 m (1,007 ft).

It has two arms, the Taku Arm in the east which is very long and mostly in British Columbia and Windy Arm in the west, mostly in Yukon. The Klondike Highway runs along Windy Arm south of Carcross. Bennett Lake flows into Tagish Lake, so the northern portion of Tagish Lake was part of the route to the Klondike used by gold-seekers during the Klondike Gold Rush.

== The meteorite ==
On January 18, 2000, a carbonaceous chondrite meteorite now known as "Tagish Lake", fell on the frozen surface of the Taku Arm. A number of fragments were recovered and studied by researchers from the University of Calgary, University of Western Ontario, and NASA; the meteorite currently resides in the University of Alberta meteorite collection.

== The name ==
The lake is named for the Tagish people. Tagish means fish trap in the Tagish language, an Athabascan language. Other sources translate Tagish as "it (spring ice) is breaking up".

== Fauna ==
Tagish lies in the path of migratory swans that come every spring to wait out the melting of the more Northern Lakes.

Tagish is also home to the Southern Lakes with trophy fishing.

== See also ==
- List of lakes of British Columbia
