= Southern Ohio Storytelling Festival =

Annual storytelling festival

The Southern Ohio Storytelling Festival is an annual storytelling festival held Thursday through Saturday after Labor Day in Chillicothe, Ohio. Local, regional and nationally known storytellers are invited to perform their favorite stories for thousands of school children and storytelling enthusiasts. A board of community volunteers and local/regional storytellers makes up the 503(c) non-profit organization that is responsible for organizing and overseeing the festival.

== History ==
The history of storytelling in southern Ohio extends back to the Native Americans. The Shawnee and Mingo tribes that inhabited southern Ohio maintained their history through stories passed down from generation to generation. The pioneers who established communities in the same area brought with them the stories of their ancestors even as they created their own. The travelers, and those who helped them, along the Underground Railroad encouraged one another with their stories of hope as they passed through the southern Ohio area.

Bill McKell, a local storyteller and business leader, visited both the National Storytelling Festival and, later, a regional storytelling festival in Kentucky with his family. With no other festivals in the Ohio area, Bill McKell spearheaded a committee of local volunteers and storytelling organizations that developed plans and secured grants and donations to hold the first Southern Ohio Storytelling Festival in Chillicothe, the historic first-capital of Ohio, in 2004.

Various venues have been used over the years, in addition to the historic Majestic Theatre, to accommodate thousands of school children that attend the festival. The locations have included the Stevenson Center library, Bennett Hall auditorium and the Shoemaker Center gymnasium at the Ohio University-Chillicothe Branch, a tent at the Pump House Art Gallery in Yoctangee Park, 30 East Main Street, the J.A. Smith Middle School auditorium, local school libraries/gymnasiums/auditoriums and a tent in the courtyard of the Majestic Theatre.

There was no festival in 2020.

== The festival ==
The festival begins on Thursday evening with a "meet the storytellers" reception that is open to the public and includes a concert that previews each of the festival's storytellers. Thousands of students participate during the day on Friday. Students around the state of Ohio also participate through the videoconferencing network provided by the South Central Ohio Computer Association. Ghost stories were added in 2009 and have been held on Friday evenings in the historic Majestic Theatre.

Past performers include Bill Harley, Carmen Agra Deedy, Donald Davis, Elizabeth Ellis, Connie Regan-Blake, Sheila Kay Adams, Bobby Norfolk, Bil Lepp, Antonio Rocha, Len Cabral, Kate Long, Lyn Ford, Kevin Cordi, Bill Harley, Andy Offutt Irwin and Jim Flanagan. Participants are encouraged to share their own stories with an open microphone during Saturday's schedule.
