= Cordi =

Cordi may refer to:

- Cordì 'ndrina, criminal organisation
- Cordi Elba, EP
- Cosimo Cordì (1951–1997), Italian mobster
- Kevin Cordi, American teacher, storyteller and author

== See also ==
- Cordis (disambiguation)
