= Elizabeth Ellis =

American storyteller and author

Elizabeth Ellis (born 1943) is an American storyteller and author known for her live performances of traditional tales, literature, Texas and Appalachian history and folklore, and personal memoir. She was awarded the Circle of Excellence in 1997 by the National Storytelling Network after being recognized by her peers as a master storyteller. She is a regular performer at the National Storytelling Festival. She was selected as a "Listener's Choice" at the 30th Anniversary National Storytelling Festival and a Storyteller-In-Residence at the International Storytelling Center. She was the first John Henry Faulk Award recipient from the Tejas Storytelling Association.

== Background and early career ==
Born in Winchester, Kentucky, in 1943, Ellis grew up in the Appalachian Mountains of Eastern Kentucky and Eastern Tennessee. Ellis credits her interest in stories to a storytelling family; she grew up hearing stories from her mother's parents and siblings.

Ellis went to library school and in the fall of 1969 became a children's librarian at the Dallas Public Library. When Ellis attended gigs of her musician friends, they would invite her on stage to tell stories between sets.

== Festivals ==
American Storytelling Festivals performed at include the National Storytelling Festival, the Bay Area Storytelling Festival, the Corn Island Storytelling Festival, the Flying Leap Festival, Haunting In The Hills, the L.A.U.G.H.S. Festival, the Mariposa Storytelling Festival, the Mesa Storytelling Festival, the Taos Storytelling Festival, the Southern Ohio Storytelling Festival, the Timpanogos Storytelling Festival and the Texas Storytelling Festival.

== Bibliography ==
- Inviting the Wolf In: Thinking About Difficult Stories, written with Loren Niemi, August House, 2006
- From Plot to Narrative, Parkhurst Brothers Publishing, 2012
- Every Day a Holiday: A Storyteller's Memoir, Parkhurst Brothers Publishing, 2014

== Discography ==
- Like Meat Loves Salt and other tales, 1984
- I Will Not Talk in Class: Stories for Children, 1989
- Mothers and Daughters: Recorded Live At The National Storytelling Festival, 2001
- Meddling In Wal-Mart ®: Recorded Live At The Mariposa Storytelling Festival, 2002
- One Size Fits Some: Recorded Live At The National Storytelling Festival, 2008
- Wading In The Jordan: Recorded Live At The National Storytelling Festival, 2008

== Awards ==
- Anne Izard Storyteller's Choice Award
  - 2013, From Plot to Narrative
  - 2014, Every Day a Holiday: A Storyteller's Memoir
- Oracle Award, National Storytelling Network
  - 1997 - Circle of Excellence
  - 2004 - South Central Region Service and Leadership
  - 2013 - Lifetime Achievement Award
- Storytelling World Special Storytelling Resources
  - 2002: Inviting the Wolf In
  - 2013: From Plot to Narrative
- Tejas Storytelling Association 1986: John Henry Faulk Award

== See also ==
- Storytelling
- Storytelling festival
