= Tsymbaly =

Musical instrument

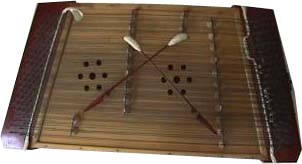
- Classification: Chordophone
- Hornbostel–Sachs classification: 314.122-4

Playing range
- various

Related instruments
- Chang; Cimbal, cimbalom, cymbalom, or cymbalom; Hackbrett; Joqin; Kanun; ţambal; tsymbaly; tsimbl; Qanun; Santir; santouri; santur; hammered dulcimer; ţambal; Tamthap-luk; Tsintsila; Tympani

The tsymbaly (Ukrainian: цимбали) is the Ukrainian version of the hammer dulcimer. It is a chordophone made up of a trapezoidal box with metal (steel or bronze) strings strung across it. The tsymbaly is played by striking two beaters against the strings.

The strings are strung in groups of 3–5, which are tuned in unison. The bass strings may have 1 or 2 wrapped strings tuned in unison. The beaters were quite short in comparison to those used by the cymbalom although not as short as those of the Belarus variety. Traditionally they had leather wrappings rather than the cotton wrap used by Hungarian and Romanian players.

Under the Hornbostel-Sachs system of classification of musical instruments, it has the catalog number 314.122-4,5.

== History ==
A small multi-stringed chordophone was first was depicted on Assyrian frescoes dating back to 3500 B.C. It is thought to have developed from the Persian santur, which entered Europe in the Middle Ages during the Crusades.

=== Eastern Europe ===
With the rise of piano manufacturing Vienna in the 19th century, access to metal tuning pins and strings became much easier. The hammered dulcimer became popular throughout the Austro-Hungarian Empire, where it was quickly spread by itinerant Jewish and Romani (Gypsy) musicians. It spread to Romania, Moldavia, Hungary, Slovakia, Ukraine and Belarus, where a variety of regional folk versions and concert instruments were developed. These instruments differed in size, tuning, number of strings and method of holding and playing the hammers.

=== Ukraine ===
According to Hnat Khotkevych, the tsymbaly has existed in Ukraine since the 9th century. The first documented evidence of the tsymbaly in Ukraine dates to 17th century, where it appears in various dictionaries.

The tsymbaly were relatively easy to make and quite forgiving in its manufacture. With access to piano wire and metal tuning pegs, an instrument could easily be constructed in the village environment. The instrument spread in popularity among the population in the Carpathians in Southwestern Ukraine particularly among the Hutsuls and Bukovinians. It also became relatively popular in Boikivshchyna, Transcarpathia, Podolia, Bessarabia and Eastern Ukraine.

The instrument is often used in folk ensembles known as Troyista muzyka, usually made up of 3 instruments played in an ensemble with the violin, basolia, sopilka or bubon.

=== Tsymbaly in the Ukrainian diaspora ===
Tsymbaly playing is popular in Western Canada among the ethnic Ukrainian diaspora there. Numerous music competitions exist, and the instrument defines what "Ukrainian-ness" is in the local music scene.

== Types of Ukrainian Tsymbaly ==
1) The Hutsul tsymbaly: a small instrument usually carried by the musician, using a strap around the player's neck and leaning one edge of the instrument against the player's waist. These instruments usually have 12-13 courses of strings.

2) A semi-concert tsymbaly: manufactured by the Chernihiv Musical Instrument Factory in three sizes designed by Olexander Nezovybat'ko and Ivan Skliar. These instruments were manufactured from 1950 to 1986.

3) Concert cimbaloms: originally developed in Hungary by József Schunda in the 1870s. These instruments stand on four legs, have many more strings, and a damping pedal. The concert cymbalom has replaced most of the smaller folk tsymbaly previously used in Ukrainian orchestras and in Academic Conservatory courses. These instruments are fully chromatic and have a range of over four octaves.

== Use of the Tsymbaly in Ukrainian music ==
Concert works have been composed for the tsymbaly by professional Ukrainian composers V. Shumeiko, Volodymyr Zubytsky, Anatoliy Haidenko, Bohdan Kotiuk, Izydor Vymer, Dezyderiy Zador, Myroslav Skoryk and Yevhen Stankovych.

== Tsymbaly manufacturers in Ukraine ==
Among the first concert tsymbaly to be manufactured in Ukraine were made by the Melnytse-Podilsk workshop in Western Ukraine by Vasyl Zuliak. These instruments had two pedals and were slightly smaller than the concert Hungarian instruments, although the range was the same. Zuliak later made three different types of instrument.

Instruments were also made by the Chernihiv Musical Instrument Factory. These instruments were designed by Ivan Skliar aided by O. Nezovybat'ko. They were made in 3 sizes: prima, alto and bass.

== Prominent Tsymbaly players of Ukraine ==
Some notable Ukrainian tsymbaly players are:

- Taras Baran: Professor of tsymbaly at the Lviv Conservatory.
- Gheorghe Agratina: Professor of tsymbaly at the Kyiv Conservatory.
- Dumitru Popiciuc: One of the first tsymbaly graduates from the Kyiv Conservatory.
- Oleksander Nezovybatko: One of the pioneers of tsymbaly playing in Eastern Ukraine.

== See also ==
- Hammered dulcimer
- Cimbalom
- Ukrainian folk music
- Khim
