= Kimeli =

Kimeli is both a surname and a given name. Notable people with the name include:

- Isaac Kimeli (born 1994), Belgian middle-distance runner
- Kipkemboi Kimeli (1966–2010), Kenyan long-distance runner
- Kimeli Wilson Naiyomah, Maasai warrior
- Nicholas Kimeli (born 1998), Kenyan middle-distance runner
