= Peter Iverson =

American historian (1944–2021)

Peter Iverson (4/4/1944 - 2/14/2021) was the Regents Professor of History (Emeritus) at Arizona State University. Iverson received his B.A. in 1967 from Carleton College; his M.A. in 1969, and Ph.D., 1975, from the University of Wisconsin–Madison where he studied with Al Bogue, Robert Berkhofer, Catharine McClellan, and Herb Lewis. He was awarded the Guggenheim Fellowship in 1999 and served as the President of the Western History Association. His primary area of research is Native American history in the 20th and 21st centuries.

== Bibliography ==
Iverson is the author of twelve books in American Indian history, as well as many articles. Those works include:

- With Zah, Peterson, We Will Secure Our Future: Empowering the Navajo Nation (2012).
- With Benally, AnCita, Finding History. Western Historical Quarterly (2005).
- Review of The Anguish of Snails: Native American Folklore in the West. Western Historical Quarterly (2005).
- American Indian History as a Continuing Story. The Historian (2004).
- 'For Our Navajo People': Diné Letters, Speeches, and Petitions, 1900-1960. University of New Mexico Press (2004).
- American Indians in the 20th Century. A Companion to the American West. Blackwell (2004).
- Foreword. Treasures of the Navajo Horsemen: Historic Saddle Blankets From the Getzwiller Collection (2003).
- Four Legged Beings: Native Culture and the Horse. Native Peoples (2003).
- With Carpio, Myla Vicenti, 'The Inalienable Right to Govern Ourselves': Wendell Chino and the Struggle For Self-Determination in Modern New Mexico. New Mexico Lives: Profiles and Historical Stories (2002).
- Foreword. Chronology of the American West: From 23,000 B.C.E. Through the 20th Century (2002).
- Diné: A History of the Navajos. University of New Mexico Press (2002). ISBN 978-0826327154.
- For Our Navajo People: Diné Letters, Speeches, and Petitions, 1900-1960. University of New Mexico Press (2002).
- With Vicenti Carpio, Myla. 'The Inalienable Right to Govern Ourselves' Wendell Chino and the Struggle for Self-Determination in Modern New Mexico. New Mexican Lives. University of New Mexico Press (2002).
- It's Time for Arizona to Grow Up. Arizona Republic (2001).
- The Road to Reappearance: Indian History Since 1890. Montana: The Magazine of Western History (2001).
- Carlos Montezuma and the Changing World of American Indians. University of New Mexico Press (2001). ISBN 978-0826307620.
- With Hurtado, Albert, Major Problems in American Indian History. Houghton Mifflin (2001).
- Riders of the West: Portraits from Indian rodeo (1999). Seattle, WA: University of Washington Press. ISBN 0-295-97786-8. Photographs by Linda MacCannell; foreword by Carolyn O Buffalo.
- Indians in American History: An introduction (1998). Wheeling, IL: Harlan Davidson. ISBN 0-88295-939-5. Co-editor Frederick E Hoxie.
- We Are Still Here: American Indians in the twentieth century (1998). Wheeling, IL: Harlan Davidson. ISBN 0-88295-940-9.
- Barry Goldwater: Native Arizonan (1997). Norman, OK: University of Oklahoma Press. ISBN 0-8061-2958-1.
- Major Problems in American Indian History: Documents and essays (1994). Lexington, MA: D.C. Heath and Co. ISBN 0-669-27049-0.Co-editor Albert L Hurtado.
- When Indians Became Cowboys: Native peoples and cattle ranching in the American West (1994). Norman, OK: University of Oklahoma Press. ISBN 0-8061-1867-9.
- The Navajos (1990). New York: Chelsea House Publishers. ISBN 1-55546-719-9.
- The Plains Indians of the Twentieth Century (1985). Norman, OK: University of Oklahoma Press. ISBN 0-8061-1866-0.
- Carlos Montezuma and the Changing World of American Indians (1982). Albuquerque, NM: University of New Mexico Press. ISBN 0-8263-0641-1.
- The Navajo Nation (1981). Westport, CT: Greenwood Press. ISBN 0-313-22309-2.
- The Navajos: A critical bibliography (1976). Bloomington, IN: Indiana University Press. ISBN 0-253-33986-3.
