= Cimbalom =

Hammered dulcimer musical instrument

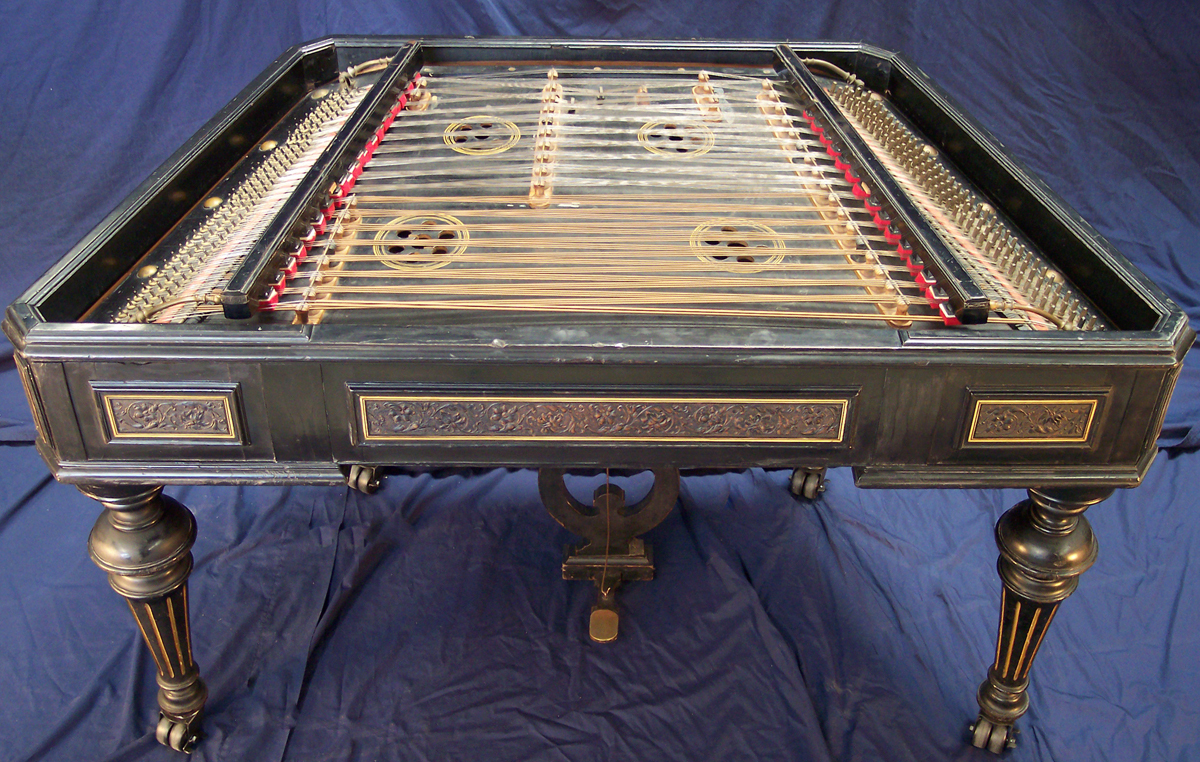
- Top view and playing area of a modern concert cimbalom

String instrument
- Classification: String instrument (struck or plucked); Chordophone

Playing range
- Various (see § The concert cimbalom below)

Related instruments
- hammered dulcimer; santoor; tsymbaly; yangqin

The cimbalom (/ˈsɪmbələm, -ˌlɒm/; Hungarian: [ˈt͡simbɒlom]; also cimbal or concert cimbalom) is a type of chordophone composed of a large, trapezoidal box on legs with metal strings stretched across its top and a damping pedal underneath. It was designed and created by V. Josef Schunda in 1874 in Budapest, based on his modifications to the existing hammered dulcimer instruments which were already present in Central and Eastern Europe.

Today the instrument is mainly played in Hungary, Slovakia, Moravia, Belarus, Romania, Moldova, and Ukraine.

The cimbalom is typically played by striking two sticks, often with cotton-wound tips, against the strings which are on the top of the instrument. The steel treble strings are arranged in groups of 4 and are tuned in unison. The bass strings which are over-spun with copper, are arranged in groups of 3 and are also tuned in unison. The Hornbostel–Sachs musical instrument classification system registers the cimbalom with the number 314.122-4,5.

== History ==
Taraf de Akácfa performing "Geamparale de la Clejani" on violin, accordion, double bass, and cimbalom.

The modern Hungarian concert cimbalom was designed and created by V. Josef Schunda in 1874 in Budapest based on his modifications to existing folk dulcimers. He demonstrated an early prototype with some improvements at the 1873 Vienna World's Fair, gaining praise from audiences and drawing the attention of highly-placed Hungarian politicians such as József Zichy, Gyula Andrássy, and King Franz Joseph. He then continued to work to modify and improve his design. He extended the length of the strings and redesigned the position of the bridges to improve the tone and musical range. He added heavy dampers which would allow a greater degree of control over the ringing of the strings, and a metal brace inside the instrument which would increase its stability. Four detachable legs were added to support this much larger instrument; its folkloric predecessors had usually been played on a barrel or table.

Schunda began serial production of his concert cimbalom in 1874, manufacturing them in a piano shop located on Hajós utca, across the street from the Budapest Opera House in Pest. He also started to develop a playing method and school to popularize his new instrument, eventually recruiting Géza Allaga, a prominent musician and pedagogue, to publish method books. Prominent Hungarian musicians such as Franz Liszt became increasingly interested in the instrument and its possibilities. The instrument quickly became popular among the Bourgeoisie as well as Roma musicians, and by 1906, Schunda had produced over ten thousand instruments.

Walter Zev Feldman took to reintroducing the instrument for Jewish folk music and derivatives in the 1970s.

Concert cimbalom with a range of C to e′′′ made by Vencel József Schunda.

== Characteristics ==
Concert instruments from Schunda onward are fully chromatic. The Schunda tuning system established a standard pitch range of four octaves plus a major 3rd; extending from C to e′′′ (Helmholtz pitch notation). The cimbalom has continued its development and modern concert instruments are often further expanded and have numerous refinements beyond Schunda's design. These instruments can now have a pitch range that extends five fully chromatic octaves from AA to a′′′.

Contemporary cimbalom makers also create smaller instruments. These run the gamut from less weighty versions of Schunda's original concert layout to truly portable, fully chromatic cimbaloms (which use Schunda's signature tuning pattern and note layout but with reduced range in the bass). Modern makers also continue to craft new and traditional folk-style instruments.

A smaller, more portable version of the concert cimbalom was produced in Ukraine from the 1950s to the 1980s that came with detachable legs and dampers, but could be carried more easily than the larger concert instrument. These instruments were produced by the Chernihiv factory and the Melnytso-Podilsk folk instruments workshop which also produced many types of other folk instruments.

== Compositions for cimbalom ==
=== Classical and contemporary music ===
Modern concert cimbalom with a range of AA to a′′′ made by Kovács Balázs.

Many composers have written for the cimbalom. Zoltán Kodály made extensive use of the instrument in his orchestral suite Háry János which helped make the cimbalom known outside Eastern Europe. Igor Stravinsky was also an enthusiast. He owned a cimbalom which he purchased after hearing Aladár Rácz perform on the instrument. He included the cimbalom in his ballet Renard (1915–16), his Ragtime for eleven instruments, his original (1917) scoring for Les Noces, and his Four Russian Songs. Franz Liszt used the cimbalom in his Ungarischer Sturmmarsch (1876) and in the orchestral version of his Hungarian Rhapsody No. 6. Béla Bartók used it in his Rhapsody No. 1 for violin and orchestra (1928).

More recently, other composers including Pierre Boulez, Peter Maxwell Davies, Peter Eötvös, György Kurtág, Miklós Kocsár, Richard Grimes, Louis Andriessen, and Peter Machajdík have made a great use of cimbalom in their works. Henri Dutilleux used it extensively in Mystère de l'Instant for chamber orchestra, and L'arbre des songes for violin & orchestra. Elvis Costello's orchestral ballet score Il Sogno includes several extended cimbalom passages. Harrison Birtwistle's operas Gawain (1991) and The Minotaur (2008) each utilize the cimbalom. John Adams uses the instrument prominently in his large 2012 symphonic oratorio The Gospel According to the Other Mary as well as in his 2014 dramatic symphony Scheherazade.2. Cimbalom is used in a popular arrangement of Debussy's La plus que lente which the composer approved but did not actually score. (La plus que lente with cimbalom saw renewed popularity with its inclusion in world tours of the Hundred Gypsy Violins starting in 1985.)

=== Film and television ===
The cimbalom has occasionally been used in film scores, especially to introduce a "foreign" feel. The cimbalom appears in Christmas in Connecticut (1945) in a scene in Felix's (S. Z. Sakall) Hungarian restaurant in Manhattan. It was also featured in the films Captain Blood (1935), The Divorce of Lady X (1938), and Sherlock Holmes and the Secret Weapon (1943).

The cimbalom was used in the film score for the movie In the Heat of the Night (1967). Composer Carmine Coppola made heavy use of the cimbalom in his soundtrack for The Black Stallion (1979) to accentuate the Arabian heritage of the majestic horse. Miklós Rózsa used the cimbalom in the main theme and throughout the score for the science-fiction thriller The Power (1968). John Barry used it in the title theme for the film The Ipcress File (1965), as well as in the main theme of the ITC TV series The Persuaders! (1971); in both examples the performer was John Leach. James Horner made use of the instrument in his "Stealing the Enterprise" cue from Star Trek III: The Search for Spock (1984). In addition, John Williams has made less prominent use of the instrument in scores such as Raiders of the Lost Ark (1981). Howard Shore used the cimbalom as well to express Gollum's sneaky nature in Peter Jackson's film The Lord of the Rings: The Two Towers (2002). The cimbalom is also featured prominently in Hans Zimmer's scoring of Sherlock Holmes (2009). Alexandre Desplat uses cimbalom in works such as The Golden Compass (2007), The Curious Case of Benjamin Button (2008), and The Grand Budapest Hotel (2014).

In television, composer Lalo Schifrin made use of the cimbalom in several scores he wrote for the original Mission: Impossible television series, from which several cues were regularly recycled throughout the series' run.

Composer Debbie Wiseman used the cimbalom, played by Greg Knowles, in her score for the BBC television series 'Dickensian' (2015–16).

The cimbalom, played by John Leach, features prominently in the score of the BBC television drama serial from 1988, 'Babylon Bypassed' by Gareth Glyn.

=== Rock ===
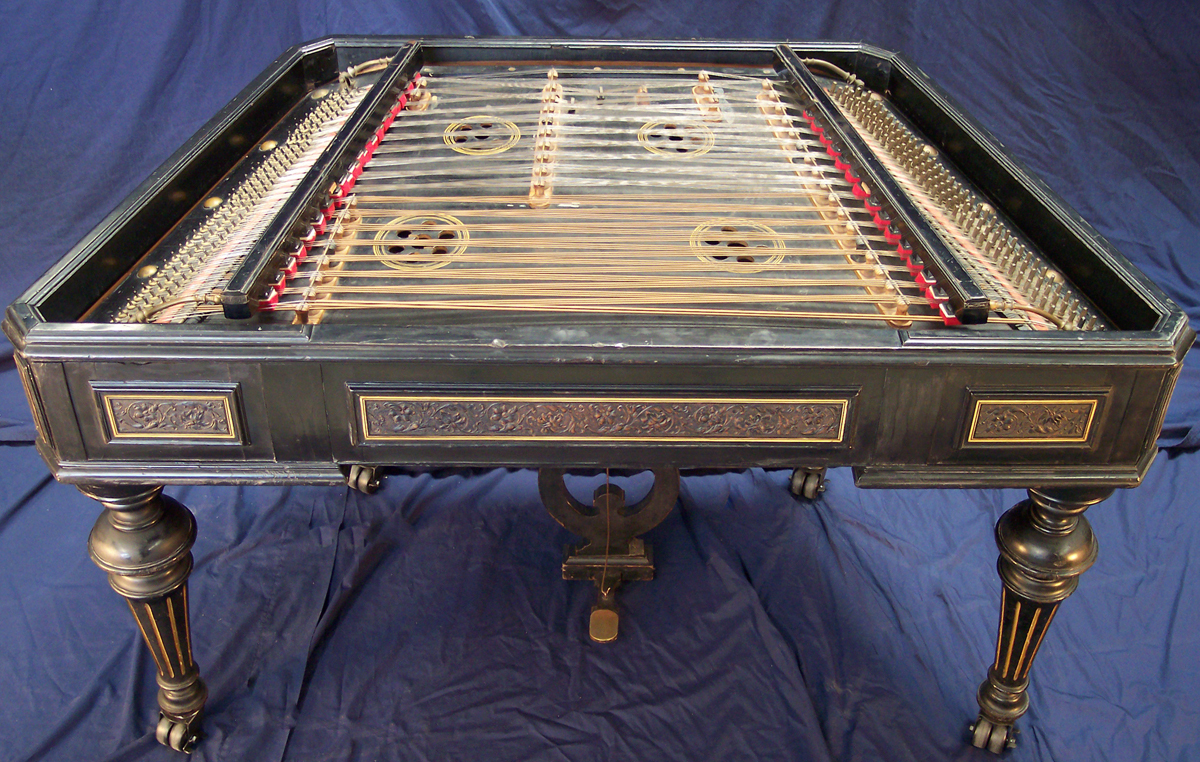
Schunda Cimbalom, late 1800s, E2-E6, + D2 string (from Emil Richards Collection)

The cimbalom was used by Alan Parsons on his "I Robot" and Tales of Mystery and Imagination albums and is included in the guest musician acknowledgments. The experimental rock group Mr. Bungle made use of the cimbalom on Disco Volante and California. It is included in the guest musician acknowledgments. The experimental performance organization Blue Man Group has used a cimbalom in its productions. American progressive chamber group, cordis, uses electric and acoustic cimbalom as a centerpiece in their music. Romanian rock group Spitalul de Urgență has frequently used cimbalom, including a full-time player in some line-ups of the band. New York multi-instrumentalist Rob Burger used a cimbalom on the album L'Entredeux (2008) by Tucson chanteuse Marianne Dissard. Alternative rock band Garbage incorporated cimbalom into their track "The Trick Is to Keep Breathing" from their 1998 album Version 2.0. Portishead track "Sour Times" includes samples from Lalo Schifrin's "Danube Incident" that has cimbalom in its arrangement.

== Schools of performance ==
=== Belarus ===
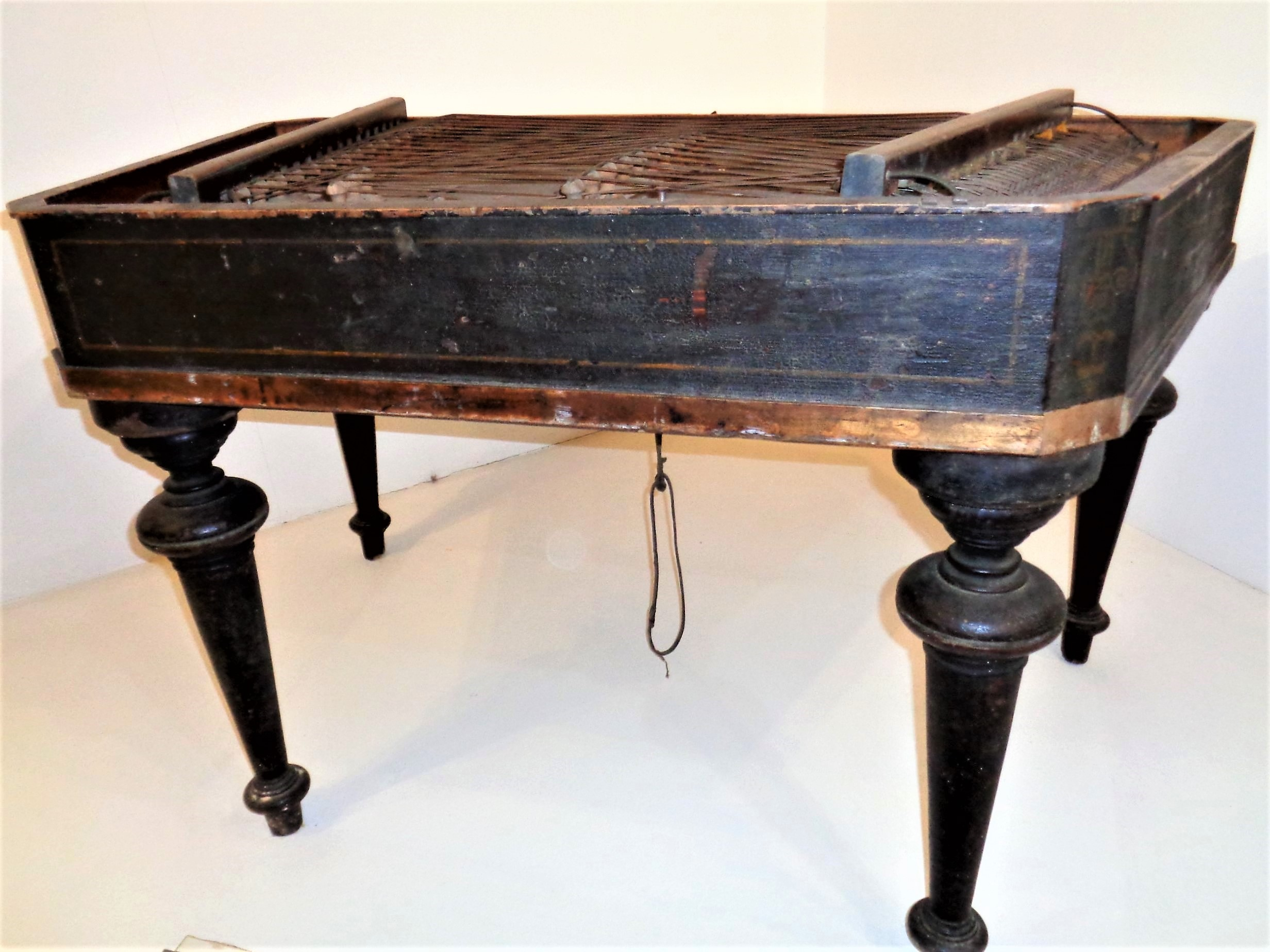
Old cimbule exhibited in the Međimurje County Museum in Čakovec, northern Croatia

Hutsul tsymbaly (Ukraine)

In Belarus a cymbaly school was established in 1948 by J. Zynovych. The Belarusian cymbaly differs from the concert cimbalom in timbre and size—it is smaller and produces a sweeter, more mellow tone. Also, pedal dampers are not typically used. Instead, hands and fingers are used to dampen the strings.

=== Croatia ===
The cimbal (or cimbule) today is a rare instrument found in folk groups (Međimurje, Zagorje and Podravina regions, parts of northern Croatia near the Hungarian border).

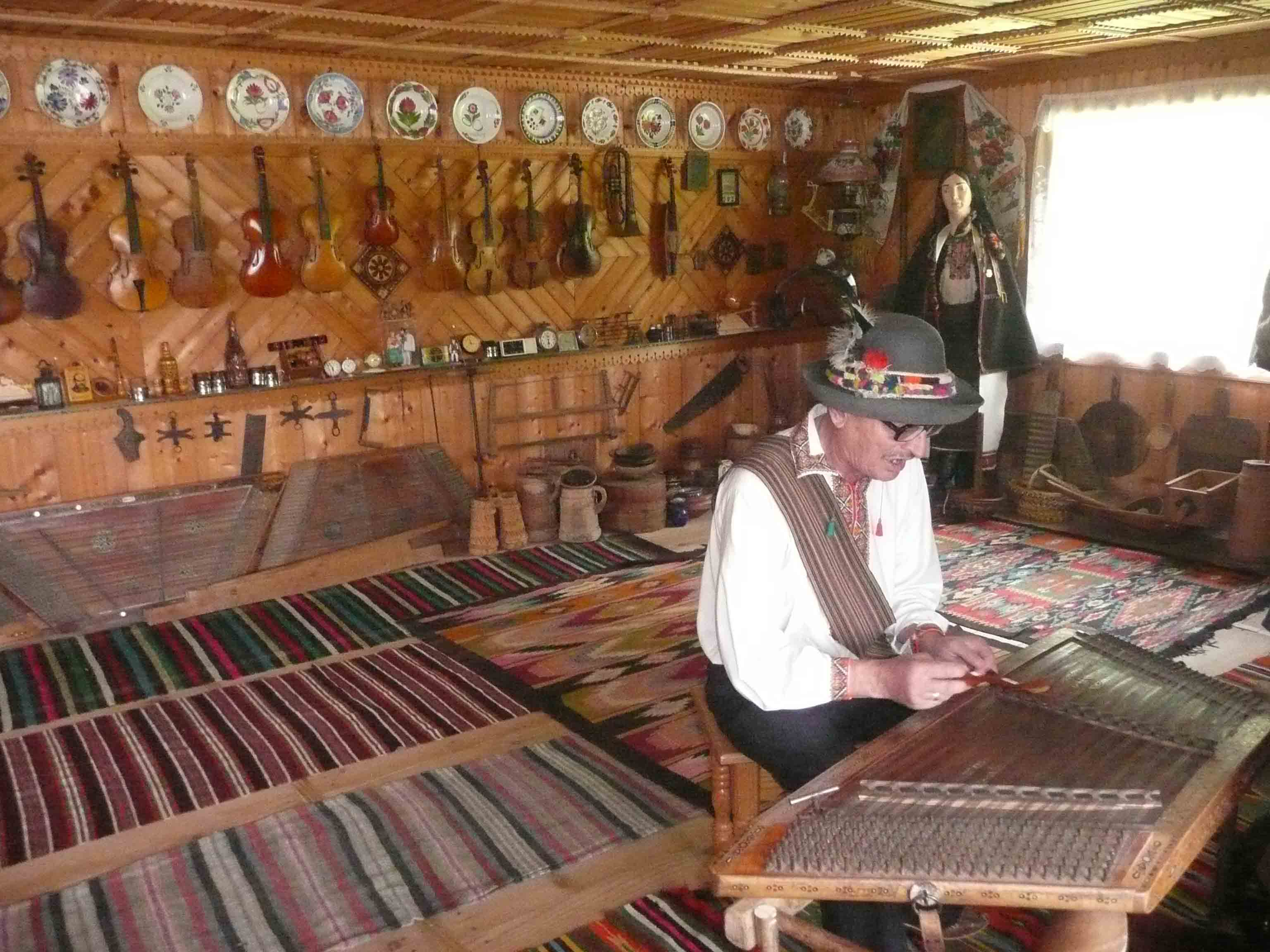
Roman Kumlyk, Hutsul musician, playing in the Museum of Musical Instruments and Hutsuls Lifestyle in Verkhovyna, Western Ukraine

=== Moravia ===
The instrument is used foremost in the historical region of Moravia as a basis for Moravian traditional music ensembles. Foremost in regions of Moravian Slovakia and Moravian Wallachia.

=== France ===
Luigi Gaggero teaches since 2004 at the Conservatoire de Strasbourg and at the Académie Supérieure de Musique de Strasbourg. His teaching focuses on classical and contemporary repertoire for cimbalom.

=== Greece ===
In Athens, a cimbalom school was established in 2004 by M. Papadeas. The Greek musicians play on small portable folk-style instruments.

=== Hungary ===
Besides the main cimbalom centre in Budapest, there is also a notable school of performance in Debrecen in Hungary.

=== Moldova ===
In 1952, cimbalom classes were opened at the Chişinău conservatory in Moldova.

=== Romania ===
A strong performance school was established in Bucharest. Toni Iordache, a Romani-Romanian lăutar, was the most famous Romanian cimbalom player.

=== Slovakia ===
The cimbal is a very popular instrument found in all Slovak regions, as well as in the ethnically Slovak/Hungarian mixed southern regions and among Romani folk ensembles.

=== Slovenia ===
Used historically in the Prekmurje region. Cimbalom is traditionally played in musical groups called Banda, accompanied by two violins, a viola, violoncello and a double bass. Classes are held in the town of Beltinci.

=== Ukraine ===
In Ukraine, the concert Cimbalom was first formally used in the Orchestra of Ukrainian Folk Instruments organized and directed by Leonid Haydamaka from 1922 by Oleksandr Nezovybatko. In time, it was replaced by 2 smaller instruments in order to facilitate transportation. Music for the cimbalom has been published in Ukraine since 1930. With the serial manufacture of tsymbaly by the Chernihiv Musical Instrument Factory cimbalom playing became popular in Eastern Ukraine in the post-war years. Textbooks for the tsymbaly were published in 1966 by O. Nezovybatko, and initially, players played on semi-concert instruments manufactured by the Chernihiv Musical Instrument Factory. In recent times, most professional performers have switched over to the Schunda system of playing on concert-size instruments. Classes for the instrument exist in the Lviv, Kyiv and Kharkiv conservatories. Currently, most Ukraine folk instrument ensembles and orchestras, such as the Orchestra of Ukrainian Folk Instruments and the State Bandurist Capella usually have 2 concert cimbaloms. Roman Kumlyk was a famous player from the Hutsul area. After his death, a museum was named for him and is now run by his family.
