= Donald Davis (storyteller) =

American novelist

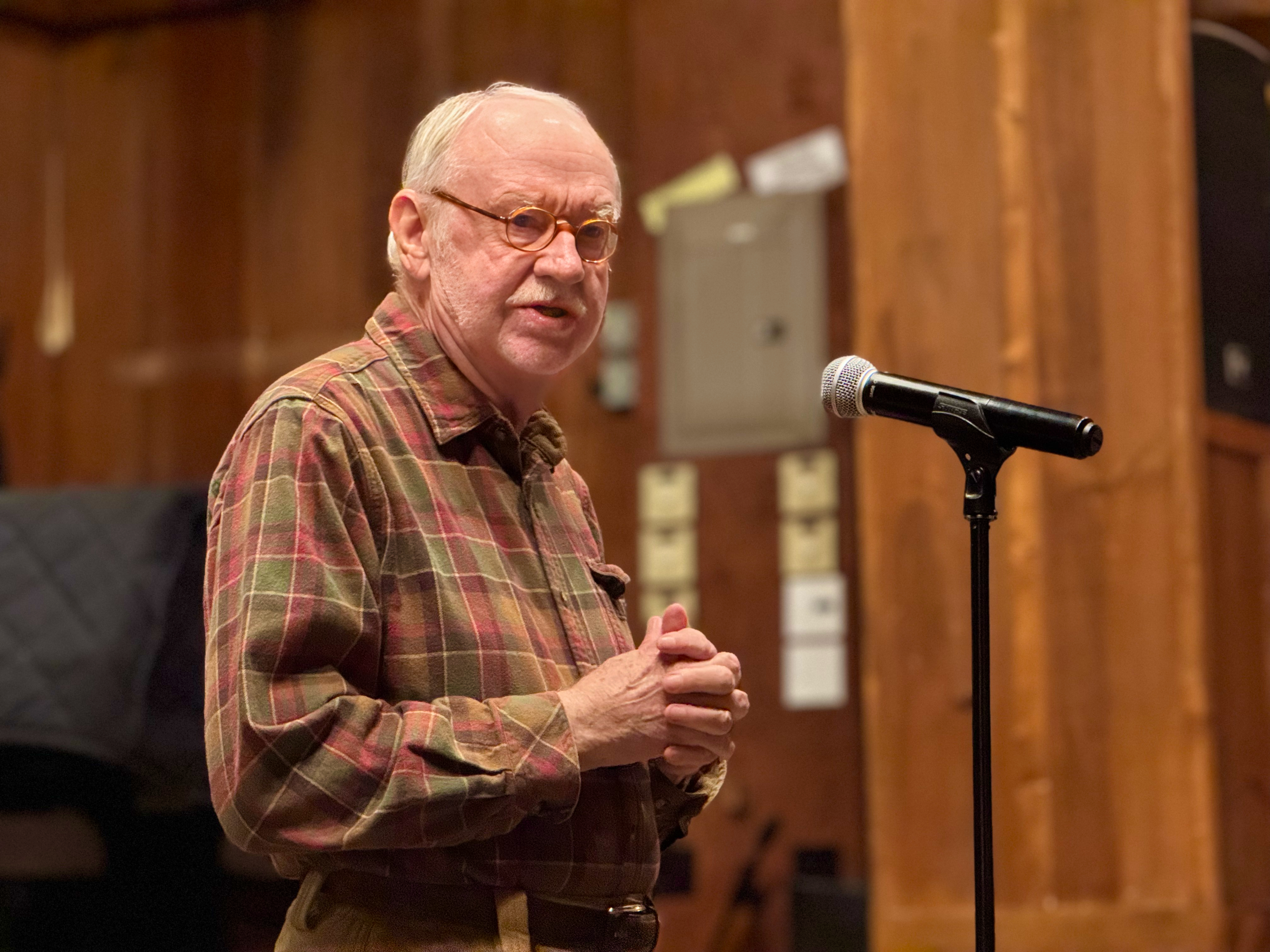
- Davis at the John C. Campbell Folk School
- Born: 1944 (age 81–82); Waynesville, North Carolina, U.S.
- Education: Davidson College (BA); Duke Divinity School (MDiv)
- Occupations: Author; storyteller; minister
- Children: 3
- Website: ddavisstoryteller.com

Donald Davis (born 1944) is an American storyteller, author and minister. Davis had a twenty-year career as a minister before he became a professional storyteller. He has recorded over 25 storytelling albums and written several books. His long career as a teller and his promotion of the cultural importance of storytelling through seminars and master classes has led to Davis being dubbed the "dean of storytelling".

== Background ==
Donald Davis was born in Waynesville, North Carolina, a small town in the mountainous region of Western North Carolina. As a child, storytelling was a daily part of his family life. "My grandmother did lots of telling," Davis recalled to the Winston-Salem Journal. "I remember hearing those stories, and I remember by the time I was in the second grade telling other kids in school stories I'd heard my grandmother tell."

He received a B.A. from Davidson College in 1966 and a Master of Divinity degree from Duke University Divinity School in 1969. Davis served as a Methodist minister in several cities in North Carolina, including High Point, Andrews, and Charlotte for more than 20 years before retiring to become a professional storyteller.

== Storytelling ==
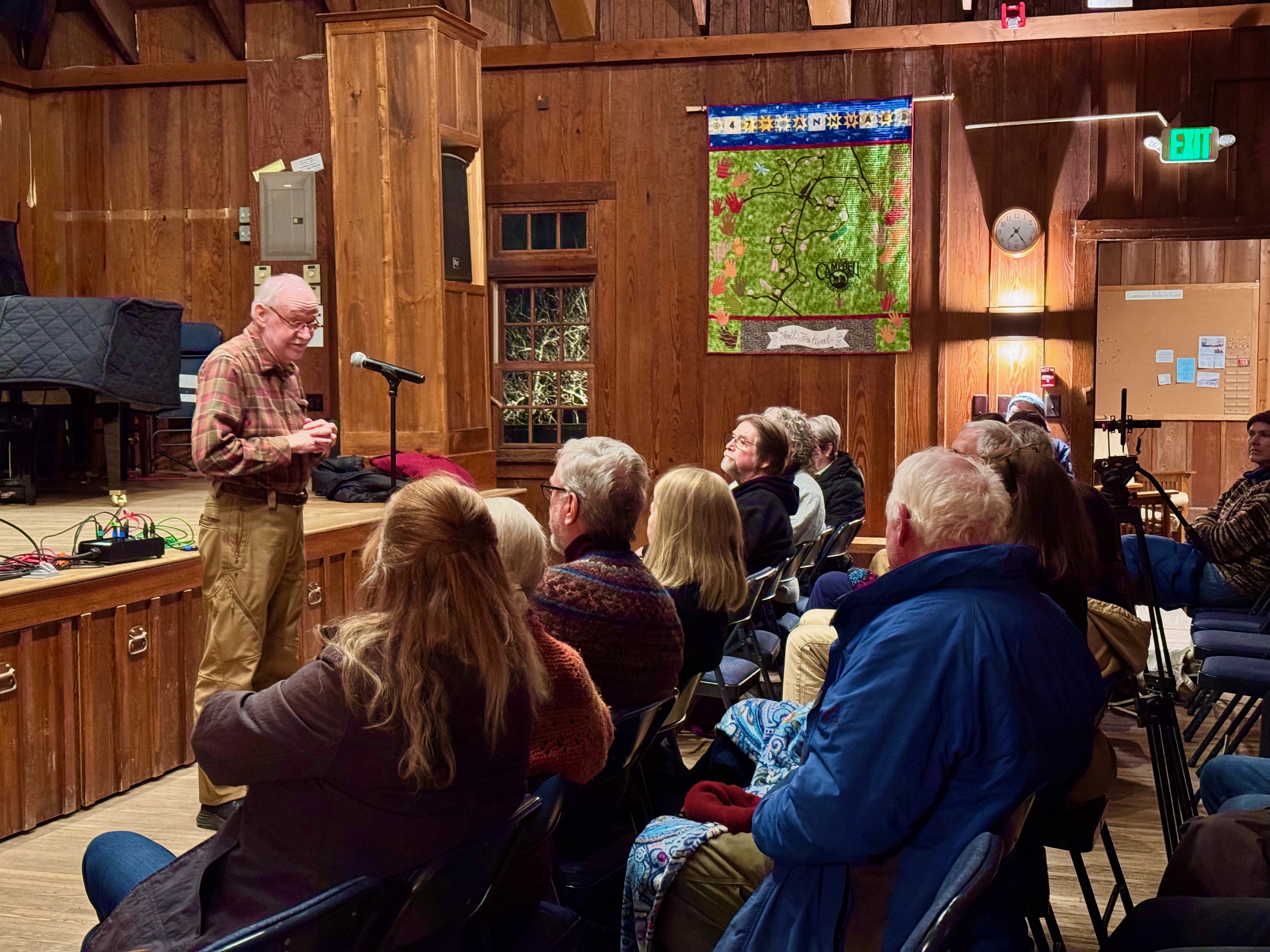
Davis tells stories at Keith House in Brasstown, North Carolina

Davis currently performs at storytelling festivals, schools and libraries across the country. Past storytelling festival appearances include the Village of Tales Ojai Storytelling Festival in California, the Hoosier Storytelling Festival in Indianapolis, Indiana, the Southern Ohio Storytelling Festival, and the Colonial Williamsburg Storytelling Festival in Virginia. He is also a regular performer at the National Storytelling Festival in Jonesborough, Tennessee.

Davis received the Circle of Excellence award in 1996 from the National Storytelling Network after being recognized by his peers as a master storyteller. He is the former chair of the board of directors for the National Storytelling Association and has been a featured teller at the Smithsonian Institution and the World's Fair.

Davis has appeared on National Public Radio, CNN and ABC's Nightline. He also conducts seminars and master classes on storytelling throughout the United States.

Davis is a strong advocate of storytelling, not just the profession, but also storytelling in everyday life. He feels that we connect with one another through the stories that we tell each other across the family dinner table or at a bar after work. He believes that stories are really about identity, about who we are, and that technology may be all about moving information but it is in our stories that wisdom is passed down.

Davis has recorded more than two dozen storytelling albums during approximately two decades. He considers himself to be primarily a storyteller, but Davis is also an author of numerous books. While the majority of his books are based on his recorded stories, he has also written a novel, a memoir and two educational books about storytelling and language.

=== Awards ===
His books and albums have won numerous awards including the South Carolina Middle-School Young Reader's Award, YALSA's Popular Paperback for Young Adults Award, Anne Izard Storyteller's Choice Award, Publishers Weekly Listen Up Award, AudioFile Earphones Award, Parents' Choice Award (Gold Title), and several Storytelling World Awards.

== Personal life ==
Davis currently lives on Ocracoke Island on the Outer Banks of North Carolina. He has three sons. He usually wears a bow tie.

== See also ==
- Storytelling
- Storytelling festival
