= António Rocha =

António Rocha may refer to:

- Tony Rocha (born 1993), American soccer player
- António Rocha (fado singer) (born 1938), Portuguese fado singer
- Antonio Rocha (mime), Brazilian-American mime and storyteller
