= Michael Allen Austin =

American illustrator

Michael Allen Austin (born August 30, 1965) is an American illustrator, best known for his work in children’s books. Among the titles he has illustrated are Cowpoke Clyde and Dirty Dawg, written by Lori Mortensen; The Horned Toad Prince, written by Jackie Mims Hopkins; and Railroad John and the Red Rock Run, written by Tony Crunk. His illustrations have also appeared in magazines, such as Highlights for Children, Spider and Cricket, as well as galleries and museums throughout the United States.

The older of two sons, Austin grew up in Florida, drawing favorite characters from The Addams Family, Scooby-Doo and Disney films. Early on in college, Austin trained to be a Medical Technologist, but later found he couldn’t resist the call of art and changed his major. After college, he moved to New Orleans where he began his illustration career, creating displays for the music industry. He now lives in Georgia with his wife, Kim, and their sheep dog, Riley, both who appear regularly in his books. Austin is represented by Portfolio Solutions in New York and has served as a juror for the Young Georgia Authors Competition.

Artistic influences: Charles Addams, Chris VanAllsburg, C.F. Payne, Edward Gorey, Peter de Séve

== Recognition ==
Austin has appeared in the GCPSTV program, The Author in You, as well as The Georgia Department of Education’s Georgia Read More Literacy Program. A reading by Fred Newman, author and host of PBS's Between the Lions, was broadcast on PBS. Austin’s books have been recognized by the Society of Illustrators, the IRC/CBC Children’s Choice Awards, Pura Belpre Medal, Parent’s Guide to Media Awards, Bank Street College of Education and the Irma Simonton & James H. Black Award for the Best Picture Book of the Year, to name a few.

Both Railroad John and the Redrock Run and Martina the Beautiful Cockroach have been nominated for the 2010-2011 Georgia Children's Picture Book Award. Books are nominated for the awards by teachers and media specialists from the state of Georgia.

School Library Journal called Austin's artwork "luminous" and "stunning". Publishers Weekly called his illustrations "whimsical, haunting and dynamic". Children's Literature said, "Austin's characters are sculpturesque." Kirkus Reviews called Austin’s compositions "clever".

== Honors ==
Sam Patch; Daredevil Jumper

- Gold Award Winner in the Society of Illustrators Los Angeles Illustration 48 West
- Storytelling World Resource Awards

Martina the Beautiful Cockroach

- Pura Belpre Medal (honor book)
- NCSS/CBC Notable Trade Books for Young People in the Field of Social Studies Kansas State Reading Circle Recommended Reading List (primary - starred review)
- The Best Children’s Books of the Year (Bank Street College of Education)
- Irma Simonton and James H. Black Award for the Best Picture Book of the Year (honor book)
- International Latino Book Awards (Best Children’s Picture Book, English)
- Américas Award for Children’s and Young Adult Literature
- Read On Wisconsin! (primary age group)
- Volunteer State Book Awards (master list, K-3)
- Junior Library Guild Selection
- Criticas Magazine Starred Review
- Society of School Librarians International Book Awards
- Odyssey Award (honor book)
- Storytelling World Resource Awards
- Children's Book Award (Florida)
- Texas Bluebonnet Award
- Virginia Reader's Choice Awards

Railroad John and the Red Rock Run

- Selected by the Society of Illustrators of Los Angeles for inclusion in the Illustration West Exhibition and annual
- Storytelling World Awards: Stories for Pre-Adolescent Listeners (honor book)

Late For School

- Selected by the Society of Illustrators for inclusion in the Annual Exhibition
- Children's Choice
- Parent's Guide to Children's Media Award
- Reader/Selector List, Show Me Readers Award (MO)
- Master Reading List, Volunteer State Book Award (TN)

The Horned Toad Prince

- Selected by the Society of Illustrators for inclusion in the Original Art exhibition
- 2 x 2 Reading List, Children’s Round Table, Texas Library Association
- Masterlist, Land of Enchantment Award, New Mexico Library Association
- Willa Award

== Bibliography ==
=== Storybooks ===
- Cowpoke Clyde and Dirty Dawg, by Lori Mortensen (Clarion, 2013)
- 10 Rules You Absolutely Must Not Break If You Want to Survive the School Bus, by John Grandits (Clarion, 2011)
- Sam Patch; Daredevil Jumper, by Julie Cummins (Holiday House, 2009) ISBN 978-0-8234-1741-4
- Martina the Beautiful Cockroach, by Carmen Agra Deedy (Peachtree Publishers, 2007) ISBN 978-1-56145-399-3
- Railroad John and the Red Rock Run, by Tony Crunk (Peachtree Publishers, 2006) ISBN 1-56145-363-3
- Late For School, by Mike Reiss (Peachtree Publishers, 2003) ISBN 1-56145-286-6
- Bats, Bats, Bats, by Amy Levin (Scholastic, 2002) ISBN 0-439-40379-0
- The Horned Toad Prince, by Jackie Mims Hopkins (Peachtree Publishers, 2000) ISBN 1-56145-195-9
- 13 Monsters Who Should be Avoided, by Kevin Shortsleeve (Peachtree Publishers, 1998) ISBN 1-56145-146-0
