= Budapest Gypsy Symphony Orchestra =

Hungarian symphony orchestra

- Founded: 1985
- Principal conductor: László Berki (1941–1997)
- Website: www.100tagu.hu

Budapest Gypsy Symphony Orchestra is a Hungarian symphony orchestra of Romani (Gypsy) musicians. It emphasizes works by composers inspired by Hungarian folk and urban music including Franz Liszt, Johannes Brahms, Vittorio Monti, Piotr Tchaïkovski, Johann Strauss and Johann Strauss II. The orchestra has been performing for 30 years as a classical symphony orchestra.

== Recognition ==
The orchestra was awarded the Hungarian Heritage Prize and it was entered in the Golden Book and the Invisible Museum of the Hungarian Spirit. In 2000 the Orchestra entered the Guinness Book of Records. In 2014 the Orchestra, both commonly referred to as Budapest Gypsy Symphony Orchestra and One Hundred Gypsy Musicians (100 Tagú Cigányzenekar) was designated a "hungaricum", a national treasure recognized by the Hungarian Parliament.

== History ==
In 1984, soloist and Hungarian Romani conductor, the primas (first violin and leader) Sándor Járóka ('The Primas of kings and the king of Primases') died. At his funeral, the Roma community gathered. Musicians gathered and from a gloomy serenade over a grave, the group was born.

The orchestra became world-famous. Budapest rehearsals were repeatedly visited by György Cziffra, the Hungarian gypsy pianist who later became the association's honorary president.

László Berki, the conductor of the National Hungarian State Ensemble, led the orchestra until his death in October 1997. It is his doing that Hungary's best musicians are members. Members have family names such as Lakatos, Lendvai Csócsi, Boross, Berki, all Hungarian Romani musician dynasties.

In 1997, Sándor Rigó Buffó became the conductor and artistic director. He rose to president since December 2005. He died on 27 April 2014. Nándor Beke Farkas was the President and the leader of the orchestra from May 2014 and the new artistic director with József Lendvai Csócsi as violin master.

== Formation ==
- 60 violins
- 9 violas
- 6 cellos
- 10 double basses
- 9 clarinets
- 6 cimbaloms

== Members ==
=== Directors ===
- President: Nándor Beke Farkas
- Leader and artistic director: József Lendvai Csócsi

=== Leading soloists ===
- First violins:
  - László Berki Jr
  - András Suki
  - Ferenc Lendvai Jr
  - Gyula Mici Farkas
  - Tibor Lukács
  - Lőrinc Danyi
  - Norbert Salasovics
  - Jenő Lendvai
  - József Sárközi
  - János Johan
- Cimbalom: Oszkár Ökrős
- Alto violins: László Tabányi, Lajos Bóni
- Second violins: Jenő Horhát, József Toldi
- Clarinet: András Puporka, Dezső Oláh
- Double bass: Károly Horváth, Tamás Radics
- Cello: Károly Szegfű, Barnabás Vajda
