= Angela Sidney =

Tagish storyteller (1902–1991)

- Born: Ch'óonehte' Ma; Stóow; Angela Johns; October 9, 1905 near Carcross
- Died: April 9, 1990 (aged 84)
- Citizenship: Canadian
- Occupations: Storyteller, author
- Spouse: George Sidney,
- Children: Ida Calmegane and 6 other children
- Relatives: Skookum Jim; Kate Carmack; Dawson Charlie; Johnny Johns (brother)
- Writing career
- Period: 20th century
- Genre: Native culture
- Subjects: Folklore, traditions, place names
- Notable awards: Order of Canada

Angela Sidney CM (January 4, 1902 – July 17, 1991) was a Tagish storyteller. She co-authored two narratives of traditional Tagish legends and a historical document of Tagish place names for southern Yukon. For her linguistics and ethnography contributions, Sidney received the Order of Canada, becoming the first Native woman from the Yukon to be so honoured.

"Well, I have no money to leave for my grandchildren. My stories are my wealth!"

== Biography ==
Sidney was born near Carcross in 1902. She was given two names at birth, Ch'óonehte' Ma (in Tagish), Stóow (in Tlingit), and a third, Angela, by her godfather, when she was two weeks old.

Her mother, Maria John (or Maria Tagish) (born ca. 1871), was of Tlingit Deisheetaan (Crow) clan ancestry. Her father, Tagish John (born ca. 1856), was Tagish Dakhl'awedi. Maria was left weak after epidemics killed the family's first four children. A brother, Johnny Johns, and a sister, Alice Dora, were Sidney's siblings from the couple's second family. Because her mother was not well, Sidney, eldest daughter, spent much of her time assisting her mother and listening to her stories. However, Sidney did receive some schooling in Carcross at the Anglican mission school prior to age ten.

Her father's cousins, Skookum Jim, Kate Carmack and Dawson Charlie, were credited with making the gold discovery that led to the Klondike Gold Rush in 1896.

== Adulthood ==
At age 14, Sidney married George Sidney (ca. 1888 - 1971). They had seven children, four of whom died young. George worked seasonally for White Pass and Yukon Route railroad, he later became chief at Carcross.

Sidney loved to listen to her parents' stories, and those of her relatives. To ensure that the dances, language, stories, and traditions of her people were recorded for future generations, Sidney started teaching Tagish traditions to schoolchildren. She assisted linguists Victor Golla, Jeff Leer and John Ritter and anthropologists Catharine McClellan and Julie Cruikshank with their research on Tagish language and traditions to ensure the Tagish language would not be lost. In teaching the craft of storytelling to her niece, Louise Profeit-LeBlanc, Sidney emphasized the need to be cognizant of the needs of the audience, preface the telling with a prayer, and seek forgiveness before offense is taken.

Sidney died in 1991. She was survived by a daughter, Ida Calmegane.

== Awards and honors ==
- 1986, Member of the Order of Canada
- Sidney was the inspiration for the development of the Yukon International Storytelling Festival, created in 1988, when fellow storytellers learned that Sidney had to travel to Toronto in 1984 to be part of a storytelling festival.

== Selected stories ==
- Getting married
- The stolen woman
- How people got flint
- The old woman under the world
- Moldy head
- Fox helper
- Wolf story
- Potlatch story

== Partial bibliography ==
- Sydney, Angela (1980). Place-names of the Tagish region, southern Yukon. Whitehorse: Yukon Native Language Centre. OCLC 22812216.
- ——; Cruikshank, J. (1983). Haa Shagóon = Our family history. Whitehorse: Yukon Native Languages Project. OCLC 21441642.
- ——; Cruikshank, J. (1982). Tagish tlaagú = Tagish stories. Whitehorse, Yukon: Council for Yukon Indians and the Gov't. of Yukon. OCLC 29444896.
- ——; Smith, K.; Dawson, R.; Cruikshank, J.; McCallum, S. B. (1977). My stories are my wealth. Whitehorse: Council for Yukon Indians. OCLC 7434511.
