= Tsintsila =

Ancient Georgian precision instrument

Tsintsila (Georgian: წინწილა) is an ancient Georgian percussion instrument that represents a couple of oval plates with handholds.

== History ==
During archeological excavations in a sepulchre near the territory of castle ("Modinakhe") a couple of plates (i.e. "Tsintsila") were found with other relics. The sepulchre is thought to date back to the 4th century A.D. The similar instruments were found during excavations near the castle of "Mtskheta", "Armazi" (eastern part of Georgia). 4 couples of plates i.e. 8 Tsintsilas were found of large and small size there. The diameter of large plates is 40 cm but the small ones' 20 cm. By their appearance, they look like usual plates. They are holed all around. That plays a great role in sound distributing. The comparison of the old and new plates showed that the Tsintsila found during the excavations in the sepulchre has a better design and sound reproducing than the simple plates used in the modern (military) orchestras that do not have girdles of sound distributing and holes of sound balancing. Tsintsila is also mentioned in many ancient works of literature, for example in Shota Rustaveli's immortal poem "Knight in the Panther's Skin". Different rattling instruments made of metal were also found there: "Lini", "Ezhvani" and "Daira with jingles".

== See also ==
- Music of Georgia
- Tsymbaly
