= Carmen Agra Deedy =

American writer

- Born: Havana, Cuba
- Occupations: author, storyteller
- Writing career
- Genre: Children's literature
- Notable work: 14 Cows for America, Martina the Beautiful Cockroach, The Yellow Star, The Library Dragon
- Notable awards: Pura Belpre Honor, Odyssey Honor, Christopher Award, Jane Adams Peace Prize Honor, Bologna Ragazzi Award for Children's Non-Fiction, Parents Choice Gold
- Website: www.carmenagradeedy.com

Carmen Agra Deedy is an author of children’s literature, storyteller and radio contributor.

== Early life ==
Born in Havana, Cuba, she migrated to the United States with her family in 1963 after the Cuban Revolution. Deedy grew up in Decatur, Georgia.

== Storyteller ==
As a storyteller, Deedy has performed across the United States and Canada including the Disney Institute, the New Victory Theater, the Folger Shakespeare Library and the Kennedy Center as well as numerous storytelling festivals including the St. Louis Storytelling Festival, the Athens Storytelling Festival, the Timpanogos Storytelling Festival, the Southern Ohio Storytelling Festival and as a Featured Teller at the National Storytelling Festival. She delivered the 2010 commencement address for the women's college of Brenau University in Gainesville, Georgia, where she was also awarded an honorary doctorate.

== Children's books ==
=== English ===
Deedy is the author of nine children's books written in English, with two titles published in Spanish. All of her books were published by Peachtree Publishers. They are listed below. Some with the honors they have received.

- TreeMan (Douglas J. Ponte, illustrator), October 1993
  - 1993 Georgia Author of the Year for Juvenile Literature
- Agatha's Feather Bed: Not Just Another Wild Goose Story (Laura L. Seeley, illustrator), September 1994

- The Library Dragon (Michael P. White, illustrator), October, 1994
  - 1997 Flicker Tale Children's Book Award Honor Book
  - 1997-1998 Children's Book Award (Honor Book), Florida Reading Association
  - 2002 Volunteer State Book Award (master list)
  - 2003 Selected book for GA for National Book Festival by GA Center for the Book
  - Georgia Top 25 Reading List, Georgia Center for the Book

- The Last Dance (Debrah Santini, illustrator), September, 1995

- The Yellow Star: The Legend of King Christian X of Denmark (Henri Sorensen, illustrator), September 2000
  - 2000 Parent's Choice Gold Award
  - 2000 Best Bets for the Classroom, Virginia Center for Children's Books
  - 2000 Parent's Guide to Children's Media Award
  - 2001 Book Sense 76, Book Sense
  - 2001 Bologna Ragazzi Award
  - 2001 Christopher Award (books for young people)
  - 2001 ABC Children's Booksellers' Choices (non-fiction), Association of Booksellers for Children
  - 2001 Notable Children's Books of Jewish Content, Association of Jewish Libraries
  - 2001 Jane Addams Peace Association Honor Book Award
  - 2001 Children's Literature Choice List (short books or picture books with more text than usual for younger readers)
  - 2001 Notable Books for a Global Society, IRA
  - 2001 Teachers' Choices (Intermediate Category), IRA
  - 2001 Notable Social Studies Trade Books for Young People (Selector's Choice), NCSS/Children's Book Council
  - 2001 Combined Book Exhibit: Children's Books Mean Business, Children's Book Council
  - 2002-2003 Texas Bluebonnet Master List
  - 2001 Teacher's Choice, International Reading Association
  - Selector's Choice, 2001 Notable Social Studies Trade Book for Young People
  - 2001 Notable Books for a Global Society, International Reading Association
  - 2001 Storytelling World Awards Stories for Adolescent Listeners
  - 2002 National Literary Association of England WOW! Award
  - 2002-2003 Texas Bluebonnet Award (Master List)
  - 2003-2004 Land of Enchantment Book Awards (Master List)
- The Secret of Old Zeb (Michael P. White, illustrator), September 2002
  - Award of Merit, Southern Books Competition, Southeastern Library Association
- Martina the Beautiful Cockroach: A Cuban Folktale (Michael Austin, illustrator), September 2007
  - 2007 Cybils (nominee, fiction picture books)
  - 2008 Pura Belpré Award (Honor)
  - 2008 Best Children's Books of the Year, Bank Street College of Education
  - 2008 Society of School Librarians International Book Awards (honor book, Language Arts picture books)
  - 2008 Irma Simonton and James H. Black Award for the Best Picture Book of the Year (honor book)
  - 2008 Kansas State Reading Circle Recommended Reading List (Primary, starred)
  - 2008 Notable Social Studies Trade Books for Young People, NCSS/Children's Book Council
  - 2008 International Latino Book Awards (Best Children's Picture Book, English), Latino Book & Family Festival, Latino Literacy Now
  - 2008 Americas Award for Children's and Young Adult Literature (commended title), National Consortium of Latin American Studies Programs (CLASP)
  - 2008-2009 Children's Book Award, Florida Reading Association
  - 2009 Storytelling World Resource Awards (winner, Stories for Young Listeners)
  - 2009 Read On Wisconsin! (primary age group)
  - 2009-2010 Volunteer State Book Awards (master list, K-3)
  - 2009-2010 Texas Bluebonnet Award (Master List)
  - 2011 California Young Reader Medal (Primary)

- 14 Cows for America (Thomas Gonzalez, illustrator. Wilson Kimeli Naiyomah, afterword), 2009
  - 2010-2011 Texas Bluebonnet Award (Master List)

- The Cheshire Cheese Cat: A Dickens of a Tale - coauthor Randall Wright (Barry Moser illustrator) 2011
- The Rooster Who Would Not Be Quiet! (2017)

=== Spanish ===
- La Cama De Plumas De Agata (Alfaguara Infanfil) (Laura L. Seeley, illustrator), Santillana USA Publishing Company (December 1996)

- Martina una Cucarachita muy Linda: Un Cuento Cubano (Michael Austin, illustrator. Cristina de la Torre, translator)
  - 2008 Notable Social Studies Trade Books for Young People, NCSS/Children's Book Council
  - A Junior Library Guild Selection

- Un Colchon de Plumas para Agata: Un Cuento de "ALAS" para Ninos (Laura L. Seeley, illustrator. Cristina de la Torre, Translator)

== Radio/audio ==
Deedy has contributed to National Public Radio's Weekend All Things Considered and Latino USA. Her audio collection of twelve short stories originally heard on NPR, Growing up Cuban in Decatur, Georgia, (Peachtree Publishers, 2004) was named Publishers Weekly 1995 Best Audiobook—Adult Storytelling and received the Parents' Choice Gold Award 1996. Deedy's most recent audio recording is her CD for Martina the Beautiful Cockroach, which includes a reading of the book in both English and Spanish, as well as a performance version of the story. That CD is an ALA Notable Children's Recording and an Odyssey Award Honor.

== Personal life ==
Deedy is married to musician John McCutcheon. They live in Decatur, Georgia.

== See also ==
- List of Cuban-American writers
- List of famous Cuban-Americans
