= Yukon International Storytelling Festival =

The Yukon International Storytelling Festival was held every Summer in Whitehorse, Yukon, generally in an outdoor setting. Cofounders of the storytelling festival were storytellers Louise Profeit-Leblanc and Anne Tayler. Profeit-Leblanc, from the Northern Tutchone Nation, was the niece of Angela Sidney CM (1902 – 1991), one the Yukon's last Tagish. Sidney had devoted her life to preserving the stories of the Tagish of Southern Yukon, Profeit-Leblanc and Tayler were motivated to found a more local venue for sharing Yukon stories when they realized that Sidney had had to travel in 1984 to the Toronto Festival of Storytelling to disseminate her peoples' stories to a world audience. In 1987 interested parties came together to plan the first Yukon Storytelling Festival in 1988. It later grew beyond the scope of Yukon and Canada to attract storytellers from all over the world with an emphasis on native peoples storytelling and circumpolar countries.

== History ==
In 1984 Angela Sidney shared her stories at the Toronto Festival of Storytelling. Fellow storytellers were inspired by her to develop the Yukon International Storytelling Festival which was created in 1988. First decade. The first edition in 1988 proposed storytellers from 4 continents and 23 languages (including 16 native languages). In 1989 the festivals take flight and promotes attendance by schoolchildren and Jerry Alfred was one of the artists. In 1990 the festival grows. In 1991 the festival gains notoriety from a national festival reviewer and changes its name to "Yukon International Storytelling Festival". The Tagish lady who inspired the creation of the festival, Angela Sidney, died. 1992's edition experienced diplomatic problems with its scheduled Russian guests. 1993 saw record attendance and box office sales. 1994 the festival experienced severe financial losses due to a windstorm that nearly destroyed the festival tents and caused the festival to relocate. In 1995 the festival was scaled down in order to recoup past financial losses, and produced a surplus for the first time. In 1996 the festival grew once more and saw its second best attendance. The 10th anniversary edition in 1997 experienced its best attendance yet and interest from the Canada Council finally started happening.

Second decade. The 1998 edition felt a loss of attendance because of competing local events. In 1999 it proposed a new successful "Winter tour" and finally garnered support from the Canada Council. The 2000 edition was held in June and had great weather . 2001, rain did not impede the festivals popularity. In 2002 the festival gained much political support and moved into new offices with a new dynamic leader. The 2003 edition saw a successful Circumpolar Banquet and other workshops and events throughout the day. The many forest fires of 2004 created a unique atmosphere for the festival, the highlight storytellers were Red Sky Performance Troupe from Ontario. The largest festival in 2005 had 12 tents with many different activities. Highlighted artists were Uzume Taiko Japanese drumming ensemble, Aché Brasil performing the Brazilian martial art of capoeira and Robert Bly. 2006, with MacPap International Brigades veteran Jules Paivio as highlight remembering the Spanish Civil War, was a similarly large and well attended endeavour. Partnership with "Harvest Fair" and the Mongolian yurts provided cozy, warm and intimate storytelling venues. The 20th anniversary was held indoors for the first time at the Yukon Arts Center in August. Highlighted artists were SunsDrum, an interactive Inuit presentation of traditional drumming and throat singing, Jeanne Doucet Currie, an Acadian traditional storyteller and singer/songwriter, Dan Yashinsky (founder of the Toronto Festival of Storytelling) and Ida Calmagne (Tagish, Yukon), daughter of the founder of the festival.

The festival is currently on an indefinite sabbatical.

== Regular local guest storytellers ==
Jerry Alfred - Michele Emslie - Anne-Louise Genest - Backwoods Benny

== See also ==
- World storytelling day

== External links and references ==
- International Storytelling Center
- International listing of links to storytelling festivals
- Yukon International Storytelling Festival fonds (yuk-170) at Yukon Archives
