= Cordis =

Cordis, Latin for of the heart, may refer to:

- Cordis (band), an American chamber music group
- Cordis (medical), a medical device company
- Cordis Hotels, hotel brand owned by Langham Hospitality Group
  - Cordis, Auckland, a hotel in New Zealand
  - Cordis Hong Kong, a hotel
- Community Research and Development Information Service (CORDIS)
- Lyria cordis, a sea snail of family Volutidae
- Cordis Die, the main antagonistic force of the 2012 video game, Call Of Duty: Black Ops II

== See also ==
- Cordish (disambiguation)
