= Louise Profeit-LeBlanc =

Indigenous/Canadian storyteller, cultural educator, artist, writer

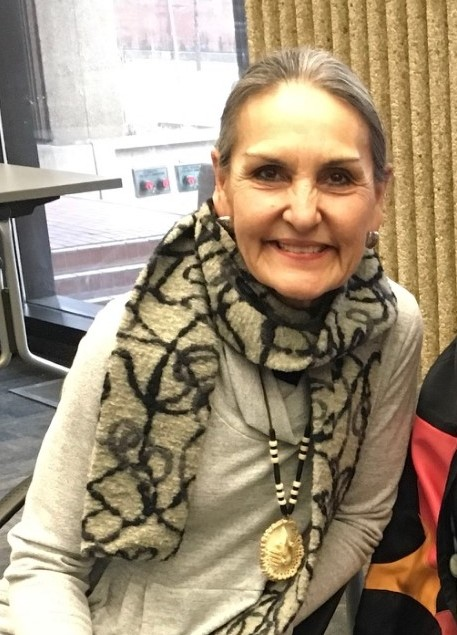
- Louise Profeit-LeBlanc (2019)
- Born: November 16, 1951 (age 74); Whitehorse, Yukon, Canada
- Occupation: Canada Council for the Arts
- Organization(s): Yukon International Storytelling Festival; Society of Yukon Artists of Native Ancestry
- Known for: Storyteller, keeper of the stories, cultural educator, artist, writer
- Spouse: Robert LeBlanc
- Children: Ellenise, Krystal, Tanana

Louise Profeit-LeBlanc is an Aboriginal storyteller, cultural educator artist, writer, choreographer, and film script writer from the Northern Tutchone Nation, Athabaskan language spoken in northeastern Yukon in Canada. She was raised in Mayo.

== Early life and education ==
Profeit-LeBlanc was raised in the First Nation of Na-Cho Nyäk Dun (English: First Nation of the Big River People) in the Yukon Territory in Canada. She grew up in the cultural lifestyle of the Na-Cho Nyäk Dun, speaking the Northern Tutchone language, an endangered Athabaskan language. Many of the First Nation members in this area are still very traditional, as they continue to live off the land while also holding employment positions where ever they reside.

Profeit-LeBlanc attended a boarding school in her primary grades but her grandmother withdrew her from the boarding school because the teachers were talking "more about 'sin' than learning about God."

In her teen years, Profeit-LeBlanc attended the Yukon Hall residential school in Whitehorse, Yukon.

"150,000 children were taken from their families and placed in residential schools across the nation. Some of these children were flown out of their communities to distant places for the entire year while others were placed in schools just down the road from their traditional lands and homes to work on farms or in the textile industry."

— Louise Profeit LeBlanc (CBNS) 2011

== Career ==
=== Storyteller ===
Louise Profeit-LeBlanc, was taught the craft of storytelling by her aunt Angela Sidney, who devoted her life to preserving the stories of the Tagish of Southern Yukon. Profeit-LeBlanc, who grew up listening to stories told by her Kookum, captivated the audience with a fable about jealousy." Sidney emphasized the need to be cognizant of the needs of the audience, preface the telling with a prayer, and seek forgiveness before offense is taken. Profeit-LeBlanc went on to become keeper of stories from the Nacho Nyak Dun First Nation.

Profeit-LeBlanc

...has come from a long line of storytellers and is now the keeper of many of these stories of the ancient and not so distant past. For 15 years she worked with her people all over the Yukon to ensure that the oral histories and stories of the First Nations people were recorded and transcribed for posterity. Cofounder of the Yukon International Storytelling festival, Yukon and the Society of Yukon Artists of Native Ancestry, Louise has attempted to ensure the voice of her people is heard and will be protected for the future generations. This voice and information is a gift that her people must share for the betterment of the world."

— Banff Centre for the Arts 2013

Profeit-LeBlanc identified four categories of Aboriginal storytelling in the Yukon;

"The role of storytelling in Yukon Native Culture" classic stories, which include the creation story-for example, how crow made the universe, how man became a human being; regional stories, which resemble folklore stories from other cultures such as how the south wind came to be, and which talk about certain Yukon environmental characteristics and about relationships of people with actual places; familial stories are those that are specific to individual families; and communal stories are accounts of events that took place in the local community (usually kin-based)."

— Echevarria 2008 citing Profeit-LeBlanc nd

=== Yukon International Storytelling Festival ===
In the 1980s, Profeit-LeBlanc and storyteller Anne Taylor were cofounders of the Yukon International Storytelling Festival, in Whitehorse, Yukon which was held every summer generally in an outdoor setting. Profeit-LeBlanc, from the Northern Tutchone Nation, was the niece of Angela Sidney CM (1902 – 1991), one the Yukon's last Tagish. Sidney had devoted her life to preserving the stories of the Tagish of Southern Yukon, Profeit-LeBlanc and Taylor were motivated to found a more local venue for sharing Yukon stories when they realized that Sidney had had to travel in 1984 Toronto Festival of Storytelling to disseminate her peoples' stories to a world audience. In 1987 interested parties came together to plan the first Yukon Storytelling Festival in 1988. It later grew beyond the scope of Yukon and Canada to attract storytellers from all over the world with an emphasis on native peoples storytelling and circumpolar countries.

=== Society of Yukon Artists of Native Ancestry ===
Profeit-LeBlanc was cofounder of the Society of Yukon Artists of Native Ancestry.

=== Media arts ===
Profeit wrote a piece for the New Media Arts program at Banff in 2006.

=== Canada Council for the Arts ===
Profeit-LeBlanc worked as Coordinator of the Aboriginal Arts Office at the Canada Council for the Arts in Ottawa, Ontario where she served the needs of many Aboriginal artists of Canada and abroad. The Canada Council for the Arts helped to bring the work of Rebecca Belmore to the Venice Biennale hip-hop electronica band A Tribe Called Red to the WOMEX World Music Expo in Thessaloniki, Greece in 2012 and the Association of Performing Arts Presenters in New York City in 2013.

== Personal life ==
Profeit-LeBlanc served on the National Spiritual Assembly of the Bahá'ís of Canada.

== Sources ==
- "Canada's Truth and Reconciliation Commission", Canadian Bahá'í News Service (CBNS), La Pêche, Quebec, 10 May 2011
- "Program to Support Diverse Artists: Communities, Culture and Heritage", Nova Scotia News, 24 June 2013
- "Louise Profeit LeBlanc", The Banff Centre for the Arts, Banff, Alberta, 2013
- Chrapko, Darlene (2011), Storytelling – in all its forms – provides insight into life, vol. 18, Alberta Sweetgrass
- Echevarria, Lynn (2000b), Interview with Louise Profeit-LeBlanc and Sawin, transcriptions
- Echevarria, Lynn (Fall 2008), "A New Skin for an Old Drum: Changing Contexts of Yukon Aboriginal Bahá'í Storytelling", The Northern Review, 29: 39–62
- Petten, Cheryl (2003), Footprints: Angela Sidney, vol. 21, Windspeaker
- Profeit-LeBlanc, Louise, "The role of storytelling in Yukon Native Culture", Yukon College, Whitehorse, NWT Video recording
- Profeit-LeBlanc, Louise (28 February 2013), RE-FRAME International spotlight on Aboriginal art, Canada Council for the Arts
