= Young Storyteller of the Year =

UK storytelling competition

Official logo of the Young Storyteller of the Year competition

Young Storyteller of the Year is an annual storytelling competition in the UK for people aged between 15 and 25, which has been running since 2005. There are a range of awards, including cash prizes and performance platforms at various storytelling festivals. Many of these are sponsored by both organisations and individuals.

The event raises the profile of young public speakers, providing them with an annual platform and showcase.

== Winners ==
The most recent winners are Jacob Williams (2015), Jake Evans (2014), Tamar Williams (2013), Banterous Potential (Sam Aitken and Jon Wingard) (2012), Polly Tisdall (2011), Samuel Aitken & Jonathan Wingard (2010), Wilf Merttens (2009), Tom Bland (2008) and Rachel Rose Reid (2007), who is a storytelling hit in more than one capital (London Evening Standard).

== Partnership ==
The event is supported by the Traditional Arts Team and the Society for Storytelling. It has been supported financially by Arts Council England and Birmingham City Council, and in 2011–12 received a grant from the Paul Hamlyn Foundation to produce Pass It On, a complete resource for teaching storytelling to young people. As of 2015, the event is managed by NOYS (National Organisation of Young Storytellers).
