= Roman Kumlyk =

Ukrainian folk and philharmonic musician

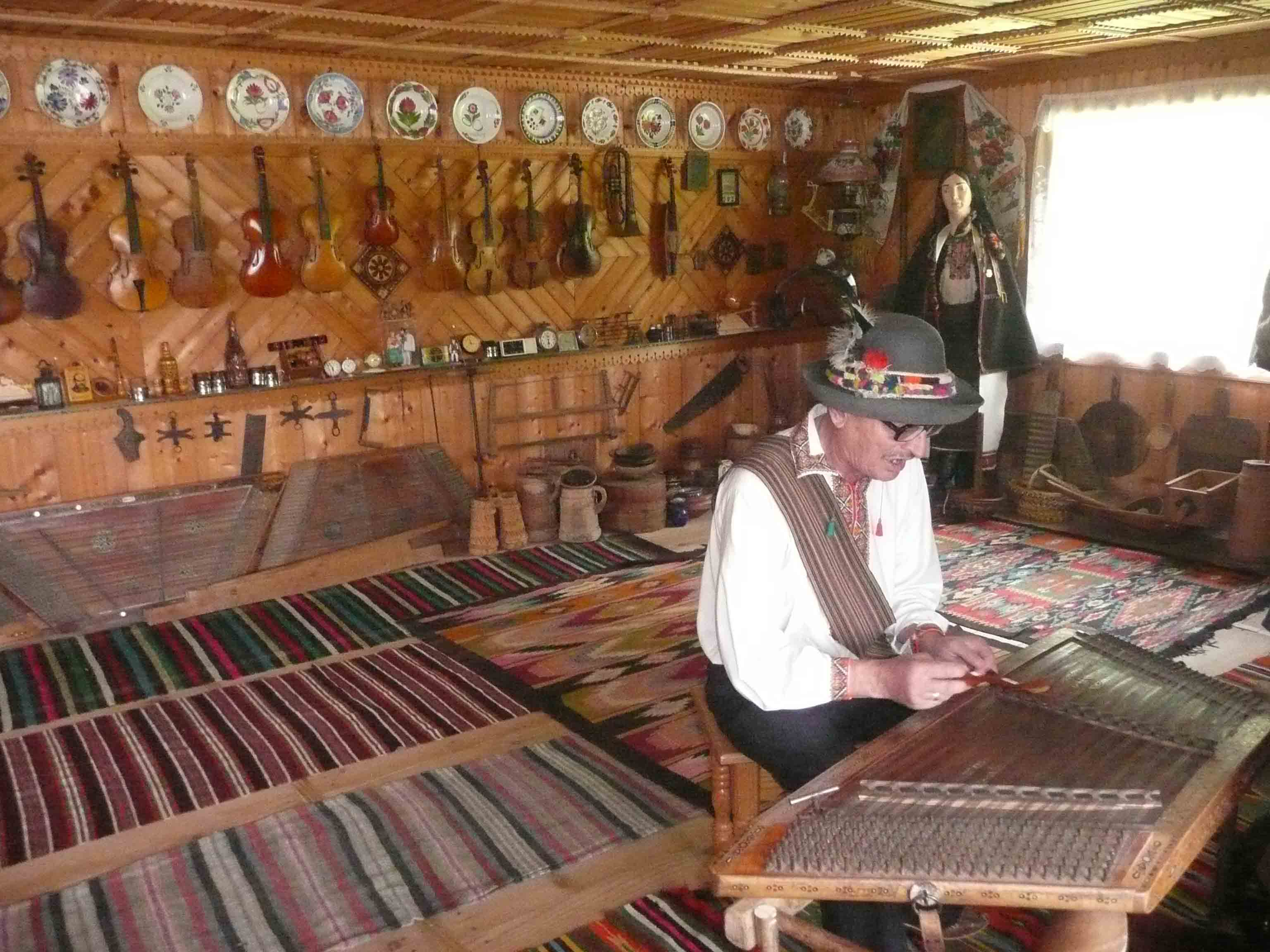
Roman Kumlyk, owner of Museum of Musical Instruments and Hutsuls Lifestyle in Verkhovyna, Western Ukraine

Roman Kumlyk's daughter playing Hutsul cimbalom at late artist's museum.

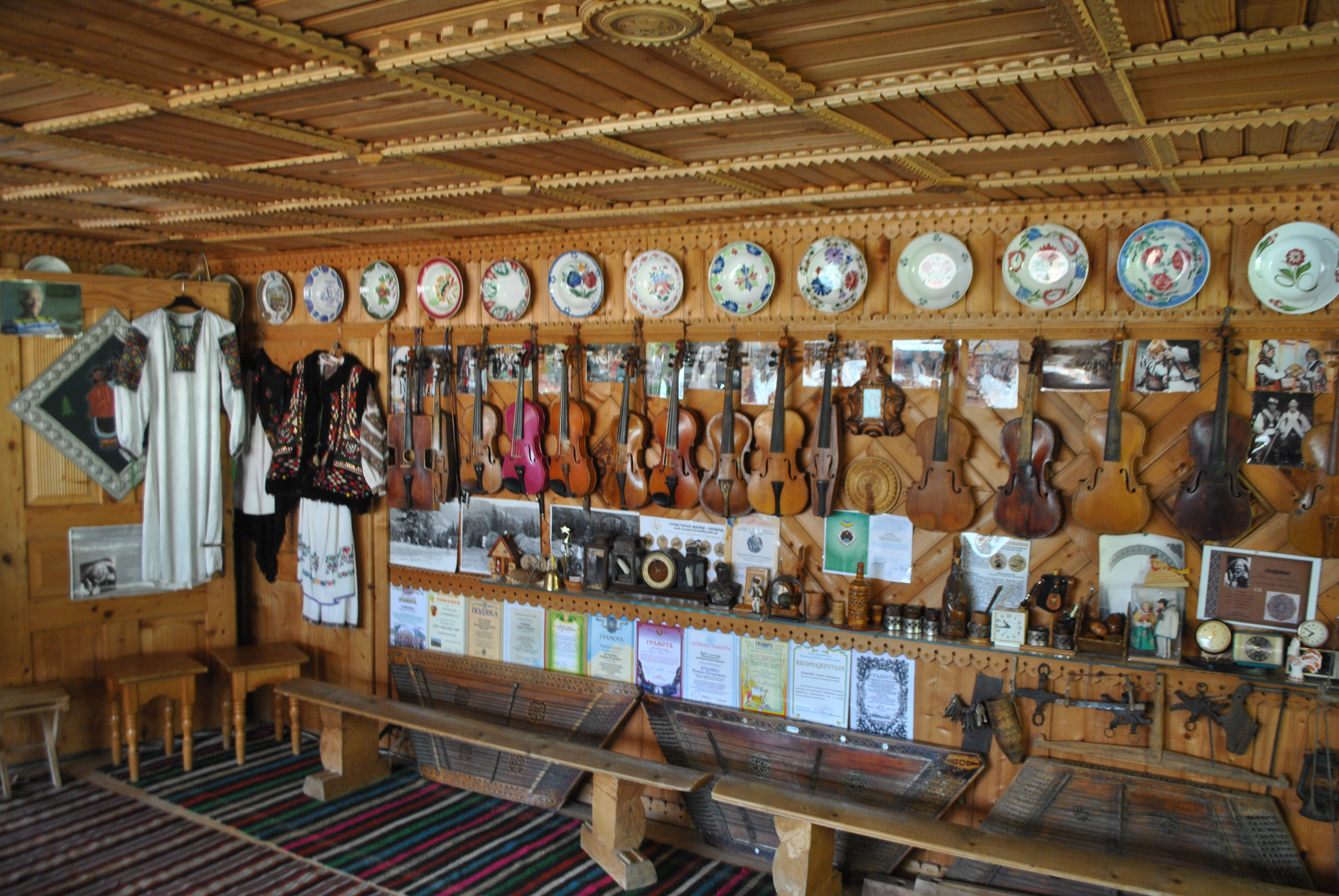
Hutsul Museum of Roman Kumlyk

Roman Kumlyk (4 December 1948 – 22 January 2014) was a Ukrainian folk and philharmonic musician, a folk instrument constructor, and a founder of the folk band zCheremosh (Ukrainian: Черемош, romanized: Cheremosh; Polish: Czeremosz).

== Career ==
He was a founder of the Museum of Musical Instruments and Hutsuls Lifestyle in Verkhovyna (2000). He managed exhibits and collected items such as traditional clothes, Hutsul ceramics, households items and instruments (e.g. trembita, violins, cimbalom, hurdy-gurdy, bagpipes, accordions, and pipes) for over 30 years. After his death, his family continued the museum and musical shows.

He was a teacher for folk musicians and played over 30 different instruments. He performed many concerts in his country and abroad.
