= Kimeli Wilson Naiyomah =

Kenyan national and Maasai warrior

Kimeli Naiyomah
- Born: c. 1977 (age 48–49); Enoosaen, Kilgoris, Kenya
- Education: Stanford University; Duke University
- Known for: 14 Cows for America

Kimeli Wilson Naiyomah (born c. 1977) is a Kenyan writer and Maasai warrior.

== Biography ==
Naiyomah was born in Kilgoris, Kenya around 1977. There, he began his primary education at Empurkel Primary School and later attended Kilgoris Boys' Secondary School. He attended the University of Oregon and holds undergraduate and graduate degrees in biological sciences from Stanford University and Duke University.

He witnessed the September 11 attacks in 2001 while studying in New York and shared his experience upon returning to Kenya. A Maasai community gifted fourteen cows to the United States as a gesture of solidarity following the attacks. The story inspired the children's book 14 Cows for America, written by Carmen Agra Deedy in collaboration with Naiyomah. It was illustrated by Thomas Gonzalez and published by Peachtree Publishers.
