= 14 Cows for America =

Children's book

- Author: Carmen Agra Deedy
- Publisher: Peachtree Publishers
- Publication date: August 1, 2009
- ISBN: 978-1561454907

14 Cows for America is a 2009 children's book by Carmen Agra Deedy with Kimeli Wilson Naiyomah, illustrated by Thomas Gonzalez, published by Peachtree Publishers.

== Summary ==
14 Cows for America tells the true story of a Maasai tribe's donation of 14 cows to the United States after the September 11 attacks. It opens with Kimeli Wilson Naiyomah, who had been in New York studying to be a doctor, returning to his village in Kenya and being asked for stories about his experience in America. Kimeli tells the people about the destruction of the twin towers, and one elder asks what can be done to help the people affected. Kimeli states that he wishes to give his only cow to those suffering in America, and the elders of the village add another thirteen. All fourteen cows are later presented to a visiting American ambassador.

An afterword by Kimeli himself explains that the book is based on a true story.

== Reception ==
The book was a New York Time's best seller in 2009. In 2010, it was listed as a Notable Book for a Global Society (NBGS) by the Children's Literature & Reading Special Interest Group and as a CCBC Choice book by the Cooperative Children's Book Center.
