= Géza Allaga =

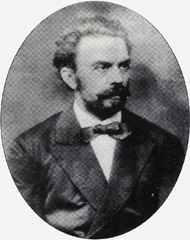

Background information
- Born: March 25, 1841; Bečej, Potisje, Kingdom of Hungary, Habsburg monarchy
- Died: August 13, 1913 (aged 72) Baja, Austria-Hungary
- Occupations: Teacher and composer
- Instruments: Cello, cimbalom
- Spouse(s): Róza Thewrewk of Ponor (married 1868–1891, her death); Lilla Sévits

Géza Allaga (1841 – 19 March 1913) was a Hungarian composer, cellist and cymbalist. He was a member of the Hungarian Royal Opera orchestra and published Cimbalom, his first textbook on the subject before 1889.
