= Lyn Ford =

American storyteller

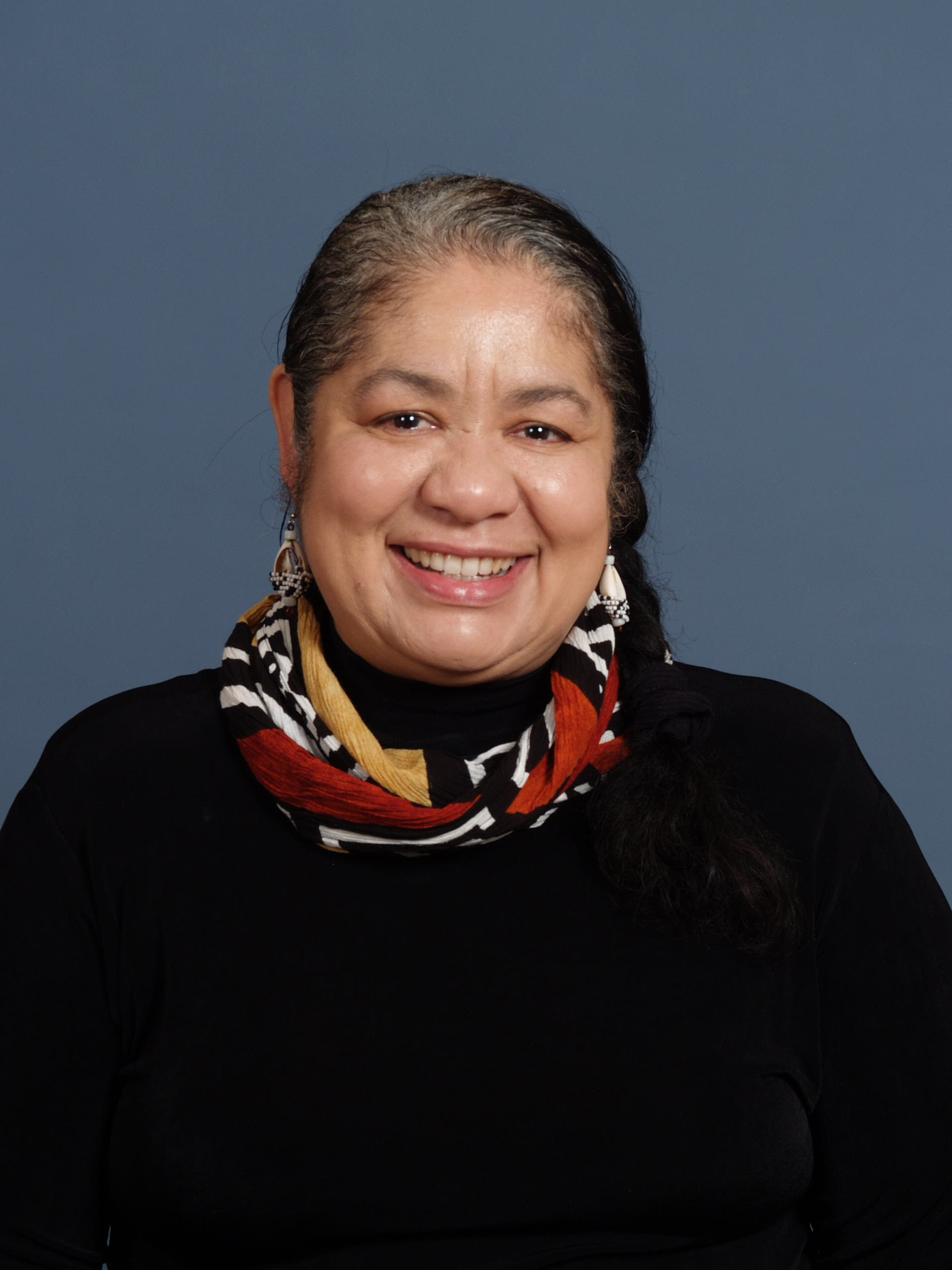
Lynette Ford in 2011 Lynette (Lyn) Ford

Lynette (Lyn) Ford, an American storyteller, teaching artist, author and creative narrative workshop presenter was the first storyteller in the state of Ohio to be nominated for a Governor's Award for the Arts. She is a regular performer at regional and national storytelling festivals and conferences, including the National Storytelling Festival, Hawaii's Talk Story Festival and the Timpanogos Storytelling Festival. Lyn has offered advice on sharing spooky narratives through live and online sessions for the John C. Campbell Folk School in North Carolina. Lyn has also shared keynote presentations, performances and workshops live in Australia and Ireland, and online in Germany and the Chennai Storytelling Festival, and for schools, libraries, and the Transformative Language Arts Network's and Ohio Literacy Resource Center's annual conferences and events.

Lyn is an Ohio teaching artist with the Ohio Arts Council's Teaching Artists and Creative Aging Project rosters, and a Thurber House writing workshop and Laughter Wellness presenter and mentor for young authors. Lyn's first publications as an individual author are Affrilachian Tales and Beyond the Briar Patch. Both books are compilations of stories from Lyn's childhood memories, enriched with information on Affrilachian culture.

Other book publications - Hot Wind, Boiling Rain: Scary Stories for Strong Hearts. Lyn has also contributed to several storytelling newsletters and magazines.

Publications written or edited with fellow storyteller and teaching artist Sherry Norfolk:

• Boo-Tickle Tales: Not So Scary Stories for Ages 4-9.

• Speak Peace: Words of Wisdom, Work, and Wonder.

• Supporting Diversity and Inclusion with Story: Authentic Folktales and Discussion Guides.

Lyn is a two-time recipient of the National Storytelling Network's ORACLE award, receiving both its Leadership and Service and Circle of Excellence awards. Lyn is a recipient of the National Association of Black Storytellers Zora Neale Hurston Award for the preservation and perpetuation of Black folktales and folklore. Lyn is also a member of the National Association of Black Storytellers' Black Appalachian Storytelling Fellows and the Brother Blue Circle of Elders.

Lyn has been called “An exceptional artist.” – Jim Arter, Greater Columbus Arts Council.

See more information in the Teaching Artist Roster at the Ohio Arts Council

== See also ==
- Storytelling
- Storytelling festival
