= Kevin Cordi =

American teacher, storyteller and author

Kevin Cordi is an American teacher, storyteller and author who has been awarded The Film Advisory Board of Excellence Award and The Storytelling World Award. He is a regular performer at storytelling festivals including the National Storytelling Festival. Cordi started the Youth Special Interest Group for the National Storytelling Network and founded the Voices Across America Youth Storytelling Project. Cordi also wrote the book "Playing with Stories: Story crafting for storytellers, writers, teachers and other imaginative thinkers" in 2014. He is the founder of the international StoryBox Project. Since 1995, he actively sends StoryBoxes loading with stories all over the world and they travel from place to place collecting more stories. This project has been mirrored all over the country and the world. For seven years he served as the Co-director for the Columbus Area Writing Project at the Ohio State University. He is currently teaching at Ohio University in Lancaster, Ohio. He was commissioned as the first Academic Storyteller in Residence for The Ohio State University. He used stories and narrative understanding to build programs for equity and social justice with the Multicultural Center at The Ohio State University. He is currently serving on the Advisory Panel for Teaching Tolerance with the Southern Law Poverty Center.

== See also ==
- Storytelling
- Storytelling festival
