= Catharine McClellan =

American cultural anthropologist (1921–2009)

Catharine "Kitty" McClellan
- Born: March 1, 1921; York, Pennsylvania
- Died: March 3, 2009 (aged 88); Peterborough, New Hampshire
- Education: Bryn Mawr College; University of California, Berkeley
- Occupation: Cultural anthropologist
- Spouse: John Hitchcock

Catharine "Kitty" McClellan (March 1, 1921 – March 3, 2009) was an American cultural anthropologist who is known for her documentation of the oral history and storytelling typical of Athabascan speaking, Tlingit and Tagish peoples of the Yukon Territory. Catharine's work extended past her academic research, as she also became an advocate for their rights on issues such as the Mackenzie Valley Pipeline debate in 1976. Her husband was fellow anthropologist John Hitchcock whom she married in 1974; he died in 2001 from natural health complications.

== Biography ==
Catharine was born in York, Pennsylvania, lived throughout the United States and Yukon Territory throughout the course of her life, and died in Peterborough, New Hampshire. She did extensive work in the Yukon from the 1950s to 1980s, where she conducted a detailed research study using their traditional oral stories as research material to study the Aboriginal peoples in the Yukon. For over 30 years she worked as a scholar and close companion with many northern individuals as they used their traditional stories to instruct and guide her work.

Her work became a model for applied anthropology. She was one of the first anthropologists to dedicate research to northern oral tradition, and in doing so, she helped standardize the rules for transcribing oral history. Catharine's attitude towards her Northern research was inherently feminist.

At the age of 52 she married cultural ecologist John Hitchcock. Their scholarly partnership began when they worked at the University of Wisconsin, Madison together, though they were not romantically involved until years later.

== Education ==
Catharine graduated from her undergraduate degree in anthropology from Bryn Mawr College in 1942. She began her doctorate in 1946 at the University of California, Berkeley, where she was supervised by Robert Lowie. In 1950 Catharine received her PhD in Anthropology.

== Fieldwork ==
Catharine's research in the Yukon was characterized by her forerunner interest as an "outsider" documenting their oral tradition. These initial interviews helped to encourage the precise documentation of particular transcripts of narrative accounts which allowed her to begin to identify the nature of differences among these traditional stories. Her research relied on time-intensive work in the North as used oral interviews and many visits to the communities to gain both a proper relationship with her informants, such as Angela Sidney, as well as to act ethically as a participant observer.

Her work on the manuscript for My People's Stories began in the 1980s, most were taken down between 1948 and 1952 and appear here as a collection of 175 narratives or cycles of narrative. Thirty-five were told by Southern Tutchone speakers. The Inland Tlingit stories or cycles number sixty-two.

Catharine collaborated with Frederica de Laguna in Angoon in 1950 as well as traveling North with her to conduct ethnological investigations at Yakutat in 1952, along with Francis A Riddell. In this ethnological work, the group discovered there were two individuals in the community who were native speakers of the nearly extinct Athabascan language Eyak.

Catharine's early contribution to documenting oral tradition among the Aboriginal people of the Yukon has opened the region up to study from others. This includes Lynn Echevarria's research on storytelling in the Baháʼí Faith. She explores similar stories and myths, though from the perspective of a recently introduced religion. Between 1960 and 1974, 205 people adopted the Baháʼí Faith. Many of the individuals maintained their oral storytelling traditions, and Echevarria's research, published in 2008, worked to document as much of this history as they could. Echevarria credits the forerunner work done by Catharine and Julie Cruikshank, stating "their extensive work with Yukon First nations peoples have done much to show that Aboriginal oral narratives provide types of knowledge different from the western scientific model."

== Employment ==
Catharine was first employed in the U.S. Navy WAVES following graduation from Bryn Mawr for four years until attending University of California, Berkeley. She began working with the University of Washington in 1952 and until 1956 she remained with them while frequently visiting the Yukon as both a friend and scholar. She then held later positions at Barnard College from 1956 to 1961 and then moving to University of Wisconsin-Madison from 1961 to 1983 when she officially retired from professorship. She remained a Professor Emeriti there until her death.

Her teaching style was unique, and though unstructured, it was comprehensive and multisensory in helping her students understand the way of life in the North. To illustrate important elements of the stories from her research, she would bring in tools, clothes, and weapons from both the Tlingit and Athapaskan peoples for her students. She would also insist her graduate students read Kroeber, Lowie, and de Laguna, as she worked closely with all of them in the prime of their careers.

Catharine was also a visiting professor at Bryn Mawr College in 1954, the University of Missouri in 1962, University of Alaska twice in 1973 and again in 1987.

== Published works ==
- My Old People's Stories: A Legacy for Yukon First nations. 3 vols. Julie Cruikshank, ed. and additions. Catherine Kernan, illustrations. Occasional Papers in Yukon History 5 (1–3). Whitehorse: Government of Yukon, Cultural Services Branch (reprinted in 2010) (2007)
- Part of the Land, Part of the Water: A History of the Yukon Indians. Vancouver: Douglas and McIntyre. (1987)
- History of Research in the Subarctic Cordillera (pp. 35–42): Intercultural Relations and Cultural Change in the Cordillera (pp. 387–401); Inland Tlingit (pp. 469–480); Tagish (pp. 481–492); Tutchone (pp. 493–505); Ahtna (pp. 641–663; with Frederica de Laguna). In Handbook of North American Indians, vol.6: Subarctic. June Helm, ed. Washington, DC: Smithsonian Institution. (1981)
- My Old People Say: An Ethnographic Survey of Southern Yukon Territory. 2 vols. Publications in Ethnology 6 (1–2). Ottawa: National Museums of Canada (reprinted in 2001) (1975)
- Indian Stories about the First Whites in Northwestern North America. In Ethnohistory in Southwestern Alaska and the Southern Yukon. Margaret Lantis, ed. pp. 103–133. Lexington: University Press of Kentucky. (1970b)
- The Girl Who Married the Bear. Publications in Ethnology, 2. Ottawa: National Museums of Canada. (1970a)
- Culture Contacts in the Early Historic Period in Northwestern North America. Arctic Anthropology 2(2):3-15. (1964)
- Wealth Woman and Frogs among the Tagish Indians. Anthropos 58:121-128. (1963)
- Avoidance between Siblings of the Same Sex in Northwestern North America. Southwestern Journal of Anthropology 17(2):103-123. (1961)
- Shamanistic Syncretism in Southern Yukon Territory. Transactions of the New York Academy of Science, series 2, 19(2): 130–137. (1956)
- The Interrelations of Social Structure with Northern Tlingit Ceremonialism. Southwestern Journal of Anthropology 10(1):75-96 (1954)
- Culture Change and Native Trade in the Southern Yukon Territory, Ph.D. dissertation, Department of Anthropology, University of California, Berkeley. (1950)
