= Antonio Rocha (mime) =

Antônio Rocha is a mime and storyteller.

Originally from Brazil, in 1988 he moved to Maine after receiving a Partners of the Americas grant to study in the United States. He has studied under the mime master Tony Montanaro, and has a theater degree from the University of Maine. He regularly performs at festivals and the National Storytelling Festival.

== See also ==
- Storytelling festival
