= József Schunda =

Family of musical instrument makers (1818–1923)

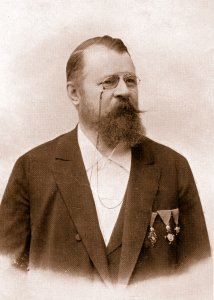
József Schunda

József Schunda (1818–1893) and Vencel József Schunda (19 May 1845 – 26 January 1923) were uncle and nephew Czech musical instrument makers.

József Schunda started a workshop in Pest in 1848, and his brother joined him as an apprentice in 1856, advancing to become a partner, and later the owner of the factory. The workshop produced the first pedaled Hungarian concert cimbalom in 1874 and also redesigned a modern tárogató, a clarinet-like instrument specific to Hungary. The workshop was closed in World War II.
