= Chernihiv Musical Instrument Factory =

Musical instrument maker in Ukraine

Coordinates: 51°28′44″N 31°16′21″E

The Chernihiv musical instruments factory was a factory founded to make stringed instruments in Ukraine. It is named after Soviet politician Pavel Postyshev.

== History ==
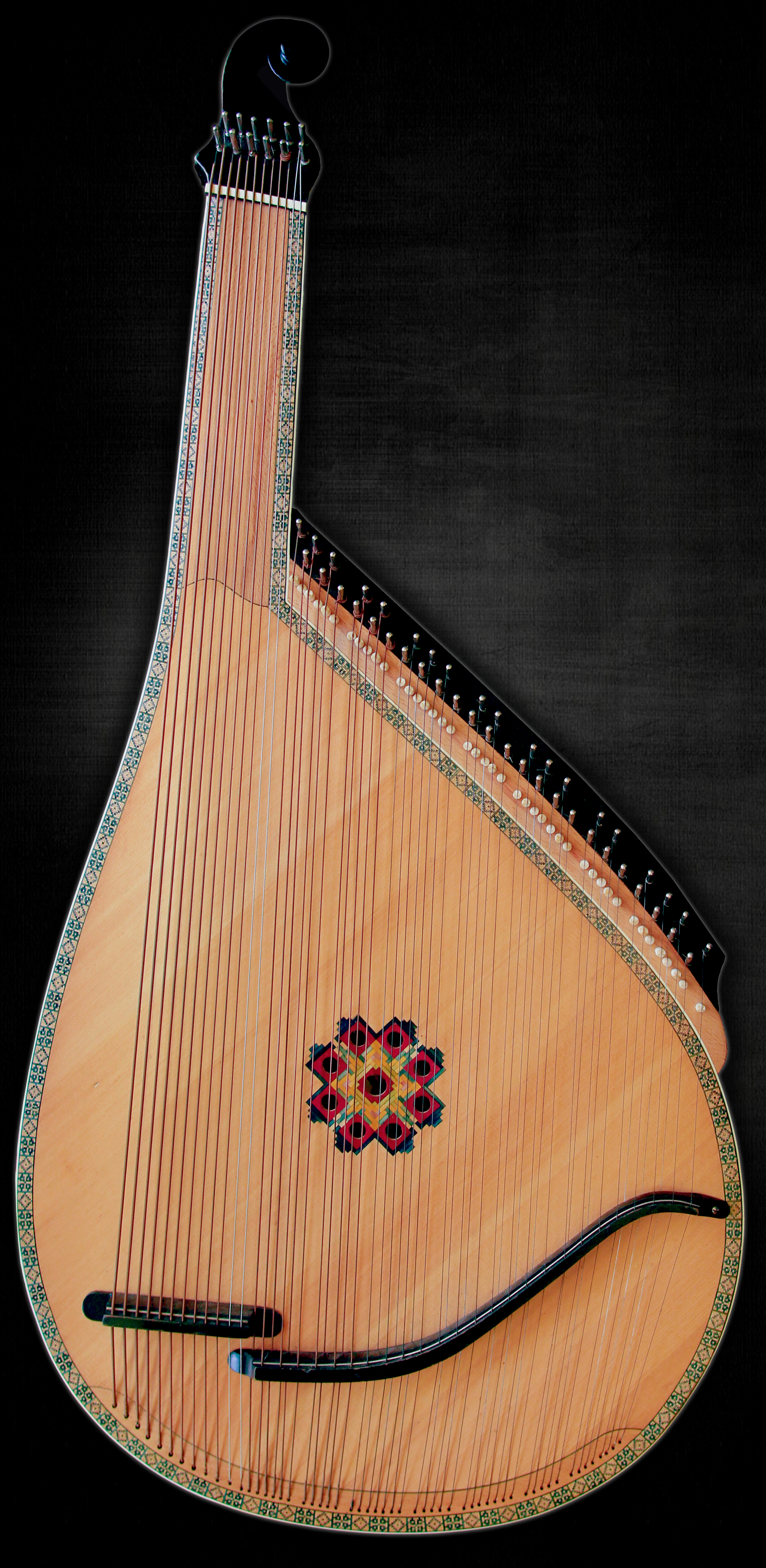
An early mode of bandura from the Chernihiv factory of musical instruments.

The Chernihiv musical instruments factory opened in 1933. Initially it made balalaikas, mandolins, guitars, and domras. There is evidence that Mykhailo Yerchenko made five banduras in the late 1930s. These instruments were probably diatonic Kharkiv style banduras. In time, more instruments Mykola Martynchuk made instruments at the factory.

In 1950, the factory began to manufacture pianos. Eventually it made banduras, based on construction plans by a Chernihiv bandura maker named Olexander Kornievsky. Ivan Hladlin—working with Oleksander Shulaikovsky, Mykola Martynuk, and Oleksiy Kilochytsky—continued this series until 1954.

In 1953 the factory began to manufacture 100 banduras a month. In 1954, they began to making banduras designed by Ivan Skliar. This serially made instrument had no mechanism, and the form was based on a design by Opanas Slastion.

Until then, a special bandura workshop existed in Kyiv—initially set up by Hryhory Paliyivetz—and after he was arrested, directed by Tuzychenko. After the war, Ivan Skliar became director and the factory primarily made instruments for the Kyiv Bandurist Capella and associated bandurist ensembles. To capitalize on the availability of experienced bandura makers and better conditions for drying and storing materials, they move to Chernihiv. They established a special workshop at the factory for these craftsmen. In 1955, they made their first concert banduras with mechanism. Initially, they made around 10 concert banduras a year, and customers had to have special written permission from the Ministry of Culture to buy one.

Skliar made a great contribution to Kyiv style bandura development at the Chernihiv factory, but other craftsmen contributed too. Oleksy Kilotsky developed a method of placing colored decoration around the side of the bandura. Bandurist Andry Omelchenko suggested the one-sided head in the early 1960s. D. Vasiliev designed the Taras Shevchenko bas-relief.

To earn hard currency, the factory began to manufacture instruments for export. In the late 1960s they received their first orders from North America. The Kyiv experimental workshop that moved to Chernihiv also made orchestral banduras and chromatic tsymbaly, also designed by Ivan Skliar with the help of Oleksander Nezovybat'ko. Instruments bore the signatures of the individual craftsmen who made them: Oleksander Shulkovsky, Oleksy Kilotsky, Iosif Mentej, Volodymir Mentej, Mykola Yeshchenko, and Sofia Zolotar. Oleksander Shlionchyk headed the experimental workshop.

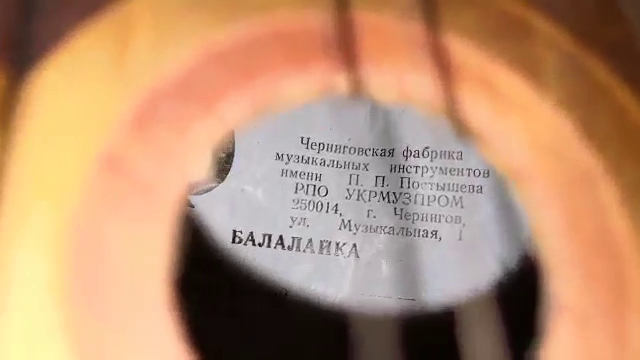
Inside of a 6 string balalaïka made in the Chernihiv factory with the name and address of the factory (text in Ukrainian)

In 1967 the factory began manufacturing a new Skliar design, the Kyiv-Kharkiv bandura. They made eight instruments without mechanisms. Due to Ivan Skliar's death in 1970, the manufacturing process for the instrument was not perfected and the factory dropped the Kyiv-Kharkiv bandura from further production.

By 1978, the factory had made 26000 pianos, 110,000 balalaikas, and guitars using over 34,000 cubic meters of wood. The manufacturing of banduras used 500 cubic meters of willow. By 1991, they had made around 30,000 banduras.

The use of willow in bandura backs and bodies caused problems for the factory, as this is not a commercial wood. It takes a willow 20–30 years to grow to maturity, so they had to find a substitute. In the 1970s the factory began making instruments with backs of poplar. These instruments, however, did not sound as good as previous instruments. They had to make the backs heavier because poplar tended to split. They continued to use willow, when they could get it, only in concert banduras.

In time, the experimental workshop manufactured 200 concert banduras a year. Each maker made 1.5-2 instruments a month. These instruments were better finished and made of better material. In the 1980s, they had 10-12 makers. Today there is only one craftsman, Petrenko.

== Current situation ==
In the period of economic restructuring, the factory shrank from 1600 workers to 68. It no longer manufactures musical instruments, but now makes coffins for an Italian firm. The production of pianos is also under question. Some authorities feel that Ukraine does not need a piano manufacturing facility. In 2008 it had become an automobile servicing centre.

Bandura manufacturing in Ukraine has come to a standstill. There are two makers in Chernihiv who still make banduras in their own homes and charge $850 US (1999) per instrument. In 2007, the price of a used Kyiv concert bandura made in the Chernihiv Musical Instrument Factory was around $2000 US.

All the banduras in the museum collection at the factory have been stolen. Some of the instruments were unique. Some have surfaced for sale with asking prices of $6000.

== Bandura models ==
The following are the most common banduras made by the Chernihiv factory with their 1988 price in roubles in order to compare the instruments.

- Children's bandura (48 R)
- Prima Chernihiv bandura (86 R)
- Concert Chernihiv bandura (220 R)
- Hand made Concert Chernihiv bandura (350-420 R)
- Hand made Concert Chernihiv bandura with Shevchenko Bar relief. (450-550 R)

== Sources ==
- Deko, O - Majstry charivnykh zvukiv - Muz. Ukr 1968
- Deko, O - Majstry charivnykh zvukiv - Muz. Ukr 1984, - Second edition
