= Cordis (band) =

American progressive chamber music group

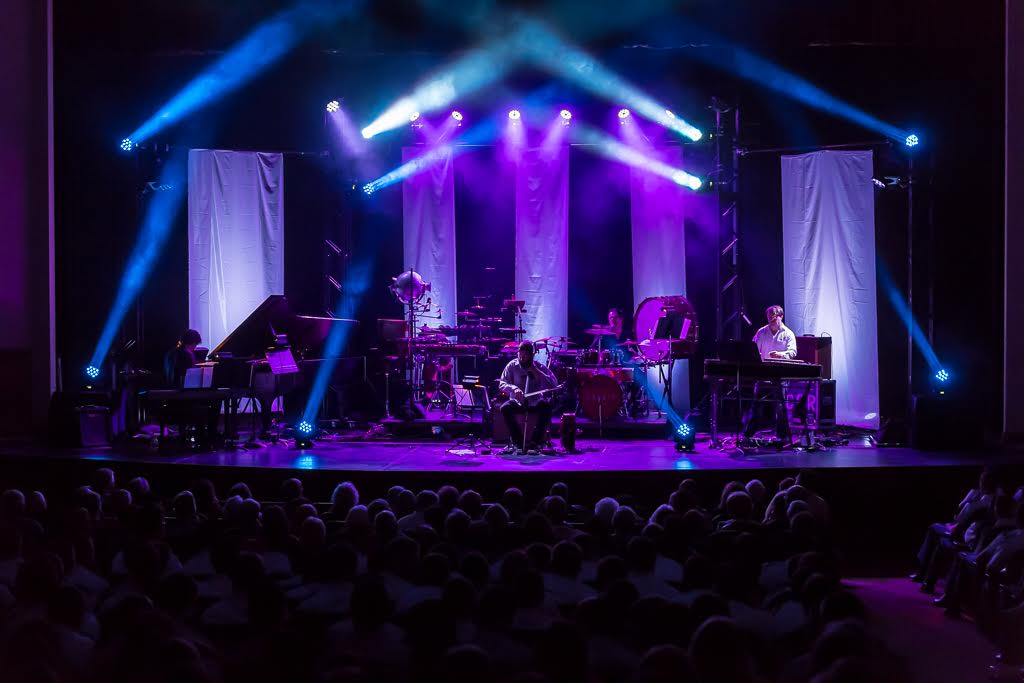
- Cordis performing live at Culver Theatre, Culver, IN.

Background information
- Origin: Boston, Massachusetts
- Genres: Post-rock, Chamber Music
- Years active: 2004–present
- Labels: Landspeed Records
- Members: Richard Grimes; Jeremy Harman; Jeremiah Cossa; Hayes Cummings; Andrew Beall
- Past members: Oscar Rodriguez; Dan Padgett
- Website: cordismusic.com

Cordis is an American progressive chamber music group featuring "an original combination of custom-made and traditional ethnic instruments." The band's primary lineup consists of Richard Grimes on cimbalom, Jeremy Harman on cello, Jeremiah Cossa on keyboard, Hayes Cummings on guitar, and Andrew Beall on percussion. The band also makes use of ethnic instruments such as the electric mbira or African thumb piano, as well as household objects repurposed as musical instruments — for example, Beall utilized a Tibetan prayer bowl and "a big metal vase which looks like a space ship" as percussion instruments on the album "Seams."

Cordis has been variously described as sounding like "if Igor Stravinsky and Sigur Ros started a band together," being "hard to pin a genre label on," and having "a very very interesting, eclectic mix of sounds." Grimes cites Soul Asylum, Afghan Whigs, and "indigenous bluegrass" as musical inspirations, and Beall says that the band's members "all come from an indie and punk background."

== Members ==
- Richard Grimes – electric cimbalom, acoustic cimbalom, (since 2008)
- Andrew Beall – percussion (since 2008)
- Jeremy Harman – cello (since 2008)
- Jeremiah Cossa – keyboards
- Hayes Cummings - guitars

== Discography ==
- Here on Out (2008)
- Seams (2016)
- Suite is the Sound (2023)
