= Storytelling festival =

A storytelling festival is an event that features local, regional and/or nationally known oral storytellers. Each storyteller will have a scheduled amount of time to share a story (or stories) with an audience. The featured storytellers are often professional performing artists, but semi-professional or amateur storytellers may also be included among the events.

A festival may be a single or multiple day event. Depending upon the venue, the festival schedule is organized around blocks of time for the storytellers to share their stories. The storytellers may rotate between smaller venues or the crowds may move from venue to venue. Often storytelling festivals will include an open mic event, sometimes referred to as "story swapping," where amateurs from the audience may share their own stories. Some festivals showcase the winners of storytelling contests such as the Young Storyteller of the Year.

At some festivals (including the National Storytelling Festival (USA)), paper tickets are substituted by "swatches" of patterned cloth that are pinned on and worn by festival participants. These swatches of cloth have a different/unique pattern each year and various colors may be used to distinguish the level of participation.

== List ==
=== Storytelling events ===
- StorySLAM (US)
- The Moth
- Young Storyteller of the Year (UK)

=== Storytelling festivals ===
- National Storytelling Festival (US)
- Southern Ohio Storytelling Festival
- Timpanogos Storytelling Festival
- Yukon International Storytelling Festival

== See also ==
- Oral storytelling - some history of festivals
- World Storytelling Day - international storytelling day with small festivals
