= Troy, Alabama =

County seat and City in Alabama, United States

- County seat and City
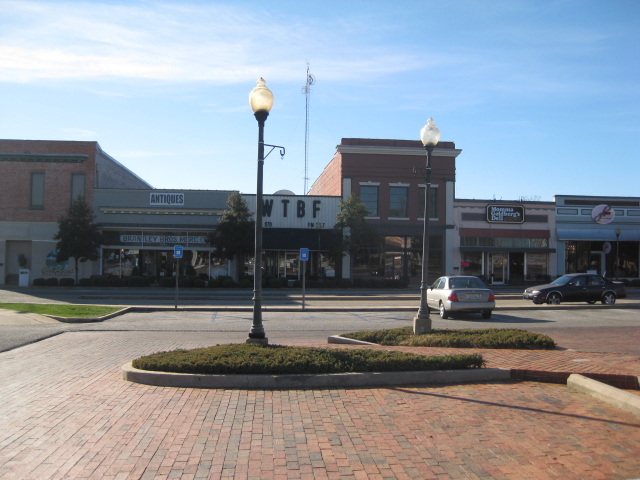
- Historic Downtown Square of Troy

- Seal
- Nicknames: T-Town, T-Roy
- Motto: "A Wonderful Place to Live!"
- Location of Troy in Pike County, Alabama.
- Coordinates: 31°48′12″N 85°59′12″W
- Country: United States
- State: Alabama
- County: Pike
- Founded: 1838
- Incorporated: 1843

Government
  - Type: Mayor-Council
  - Mayor: Jason Reeves

Area
  - Total: 28.42 sq mi (73.61 km^{2})
  - Land: 28.34 sq mi (73.41 km^{2})
  - Water: 0.081 sq mi (0.21 km^{2})
- Elevation: 535 ft (163 m)

Population (2020)
  - Total: 17,727
  - Density: 625.5/sq mi (241.49/km^{2})
- Time zone: UTC-6 (CST)
  - Summer (DST): UTC-5 (CDT)
- ZIP codes: 36079, 36081, 36082
- Area code: 334
- FIPS code: 01-76920
- GNIS feature ID: 2405606
- Website: www.troyal.gov

Troy is a city in and the county seat of Pike County, Alabama, United States. It was formally incorporated on February 4, 1843.

Between 1763 and 1783, the area where Troy sits was part of the colony of British West Florida. After 1783, the region fell under the jurisdiction of the newly created United States of America.

As of the 2020 census, its population was 17,727, down from 18,033 in 2010. The 2022 estimated population was 17,774. The City of Troy had previously been considered one of the fastest-growing cities in Alabama. Troy is home to Troy University, the fourth-largest university in total enrollment in Alabama.

== History ==
=== Before the Civil War ===
A map from 1767 of British West Florida, including the area of present-day Troy

For many centuries, the area around Troy was settled by different tribes of Native Americans, but became primarily known for its Muskogee Creek presence. Most Creek tribes lived along rivers or streams at that time. Near the Troy area, many Native Americans settled around the Conecuh River and the Pea River.

With the coming of European explorers and colonists, the area of present-day Alabama was claimed by Spain, France, and Great Britain, although very few Europeans settled in the inland parts. After being swapped among those three powers in the course of the 18th century, the United States acquired the region from Spain with the Treaty of Madrid (1795) and created the Mississippi Territory in 1798, including most of the present-day states of Mississippi and Alabama. In 1819, the State of Alabama was admitted to the Union and was soon organized into counties. Pike County, founded in 1821, was one of the first counties established in Alabama, and it was named after the American explorer Zebulon Montgomery Pike. It comprised a large tract of country, so large that it was called the "State of Pike", which included parts of what are now Crenshaw, Montgomery, Macon, Bullock, and Barbour Counties, and extended to the Chattahoochee River on the east.

After Pike County's borders were resized, the land that later became Troy was settled in the early 1830s. Originally known as Deer Stand Hill (an Indian hunting ground), which was first settled about 1824, it was later known as Zebulon and then Centreville before being renamed Troy in 1838. Troy became the county seat that same year after a new county courthouse was built in the city, replacing the previous county seat town of Monticello. The court met in local stores until the courthouse was built in 1839.

To promote movement of settlers and to speed mail from Washington City to New Orleans, the Federal Road was laid out after 1805. In 1824, a military road was laid out from Fort Barrancas in Pensacola, Florida, and ran on top of the ridges to Fort Mitchell in Russell County, Alabama, and connected to the Federal Road. Captain Daniel E. Burch of the U.S. Army marked the route using three notches on trees for a crew under Lt. Elias Phillips to follow. The route was eventually cleared in 1824 at a cost of $1,130. It followed the ridge dividing the watersheds of the Conecuh River to the northwest, and the Yellow River and Pea River to the southeast. This road became known as the Three Notch Road and ran through Troy and Pike County. While never being highly needed as a military supply road, it became a boon to the settlers who used it to move into south-central and southeast Alabama and into northwest Florida.

During this time, tensions began to rise between the local Creek Indians and the European settlers who were moving into the area. As settlers began to force their way onto Creek lands and push the Indians out, the Creeks began to retaliate, first in small factions, then in larger ones. During this time, the Second Indian War was beginning in the Southeastern United States.

Battle of Hobdy's Bridge

On February 10, 1837, the Battle of Hobdy's Bridge occurred after a force of over 100 American militiamen under Captain Jack Cooper intercepted about 75 Creeks making their way to Florida. After locating the site of the Creek camp, the militia divided into two groups to converge on the refugees by surprise.

A brief fight ensued upon their approach, which centered around two fallen trees the Creeks had used as a natural breastwork. The Creeks, being extremely low on ammunition, fired nails instead of bullets from the muskets they possessed. The militiamen eventually overran their position and captured the camp, wherein they found items recently plundered from area plantations. Exact casualties are unknown, but it is believed four or five Creeks and perhaps one American were killed. Though stripped of their supplies, the Creeks managed to continue their flight even as they continued to skirmish with other American troops. Near the Florida border, they retaliated by killing two American settlers.

Battle of Pea River

In one of the last battles of the Second Creek War, on March 27, 1837, the Battle of Pea River occurred roughly 17 miles to the east of Troy, where the Pea River and Pea Creek converge near Hobdy's Bridge. A force of over 250 combined Alabama and Georgia militiamen led under General William Wellborn tracked a party of about 400 Creek fugitives that included men, women, and children. The Creeks, angry that the land that had been promised to them was being taken from them by local settlers by violent force, responded by burning local homes and plantations along the Pea River swamp. The Three Notch Trail that traversed through Troy was also considered dangerous at this point, as local Creek Indians around the area were turning violent and burning and looting houses along the stretch. The path of the Creeks had become easy to find due to the several looted and burned plantations they had left behind them as they moved south. After finding their temporary camp in a nearby swamp, General Wellborn divided his command into two wings to encircle the Creeks. He personally commanded one wing, and placed the other under Colonel Jefferson Buford. The Creeks detected the approach, however, and attacked and scattered Buford's wing.

When Wellborn's command neared the camp, trudging through waist-high water, gunfire could be heard erupting further down the river. Wellborn ordered his men through the mud and water at a full run. Upon encountering the Creeks downstream, a fierce four-hour battle began on opposite sides of a nearby lagoon. The Creek warriors, many of whom were later found to have been using bullets made of melted pewter plates, made several unsuccessful charges on the militia's line before being overrun. Records from some of the participants in the battle reported that some of the Creek women and children also took up arms to fight, raining showers of rifle balls and arrows on the militiamen. In one case, two of the Creek women attacked a member of the militia with knives. Unable to defeat the desperate Creeks with gunfire alone, Wellborn finally ordered a direct charge on their lines. The tactic worked, as many of the Creeks fled to their encampment to carry off their children, some even swimming the river to flee. The fighting then devolved into a massacre in which at least 50 Creek men, women and children were killed and an unknown number captured. The Creek survivors continued their flight south in small groups. According to some reports, some of the captured Creeks were enslaved by local planters. Only five Americans were killed, among them General Wellborn's teenage son, James H. Wellborn.

In winning the Battle of Pea River & Pea Creek, Wellborn had defeated the refugee Creeks but had failed to surround and capture all of them as he had hoped. Instead they fled south down the Pea River to its confluence with the Choctawhatchee and continued across the line into Florida. Furious at their treatment, they continued to battle the Whites for years to come.

=== During Civil War ===
At the outbreak of the American Civil War in 1861, the small village of Troy had a population around 600. The 57th Alabama Infantry Regiment of Troy was formed in 1863. The group of soldiers from that regiment fought at the Battle of Peachtree Creek on July 20, 1864.

Troy was mostly spared from the ravages of the war, except that its sons were dying on battlefields throughout the South. On April 26, 1865, a brigade of Union cavalry under the command of General Benjamin Henry Grierson camped outside of Troy. These soldiers moved on to Louisville, Clayton, and Eufaula the next day without incident. However, roughly 20 miles east of Troy at the Pike County border, the Skirmish at Hobdy's Bridge, what some consider the last battle of the Civil War, took place on May 19, 1865.

Skirmish at Hobdy's Bridge

A detachment of Union soldiers from the 1st Florida U.S. Cavalry had been sent from Montgomery to Eufaula to escort a mail shipment through the unsettled regions of eastern Alabama. General Robert E. Lee had already surrendered and Wilson's Raid had just devastated the region, but many former Confederate soldiers were still drifting through the region trying to get home, which presented a threat.

A mail escort, commanded by Lt. Joseph Carroll of the Union Army, left Montgomery on May 11, 1865, and reached Eufaula without difficulty. The total strength of the detachment was only 25 men, but because all seemed quiet, Carroll decided to spend a few days in Eufaula to rest his horses. Since some of his men were natives of the area, he granted them short leaves to go to visit their families. The entire detachment was to reassemble at Hobdy's Bridge over the Pea River on May 19, 1865.

After many of his men dispersed to their homes, however, Carroll learned that a party of pro-Confederate "guerrillas" had been seen in the area. The identity of this unit, if it had an identity, is unknown, but at about the same time, General Alexander Asboth in Pensacola reported that several companies of cavalry made up of "unrepentant rebels" were still active in the Alabama and Florida borderlands.

Upon receiving this intelligence, Carroll decided to return to Montgomery as quickly as possible and crossed Hobdy's Bridge with the main body of his detachment two days before the appointed rendezvous. The other men of his command, at home and visiting their families, had no way to know of his decision to leave early or of the danger they faced.

According to military records, the remaining Union soldiers gathered at Hobdy's Bridge as ordered on the morning of May 19, 1865, only to learn that Carroll and the main body were already gone. Turning their horses onto the long wooden bridge over Pea River, the cavalrymen started off to follow their commander's route. Unfortunately, they rode straight into a group of Confederate rebel guerillas.

Three Confederate soldiers were wounded in the fight, and one Union soldier was killed, identified as Corporal John W. Skinner of Company C, 1st Florida U.S. Cavalry. He was killed in action six days after Private John J. Williams of the 34th Indiana, who died at Battle of Palmito Ranch, and is generally said to have been the last man killed in the Civil War. That sad distinction actually belongs to Corporal Skinner, who died on the wooden planks of Hobdy's Bridge in Alabama.

=== After the war ===
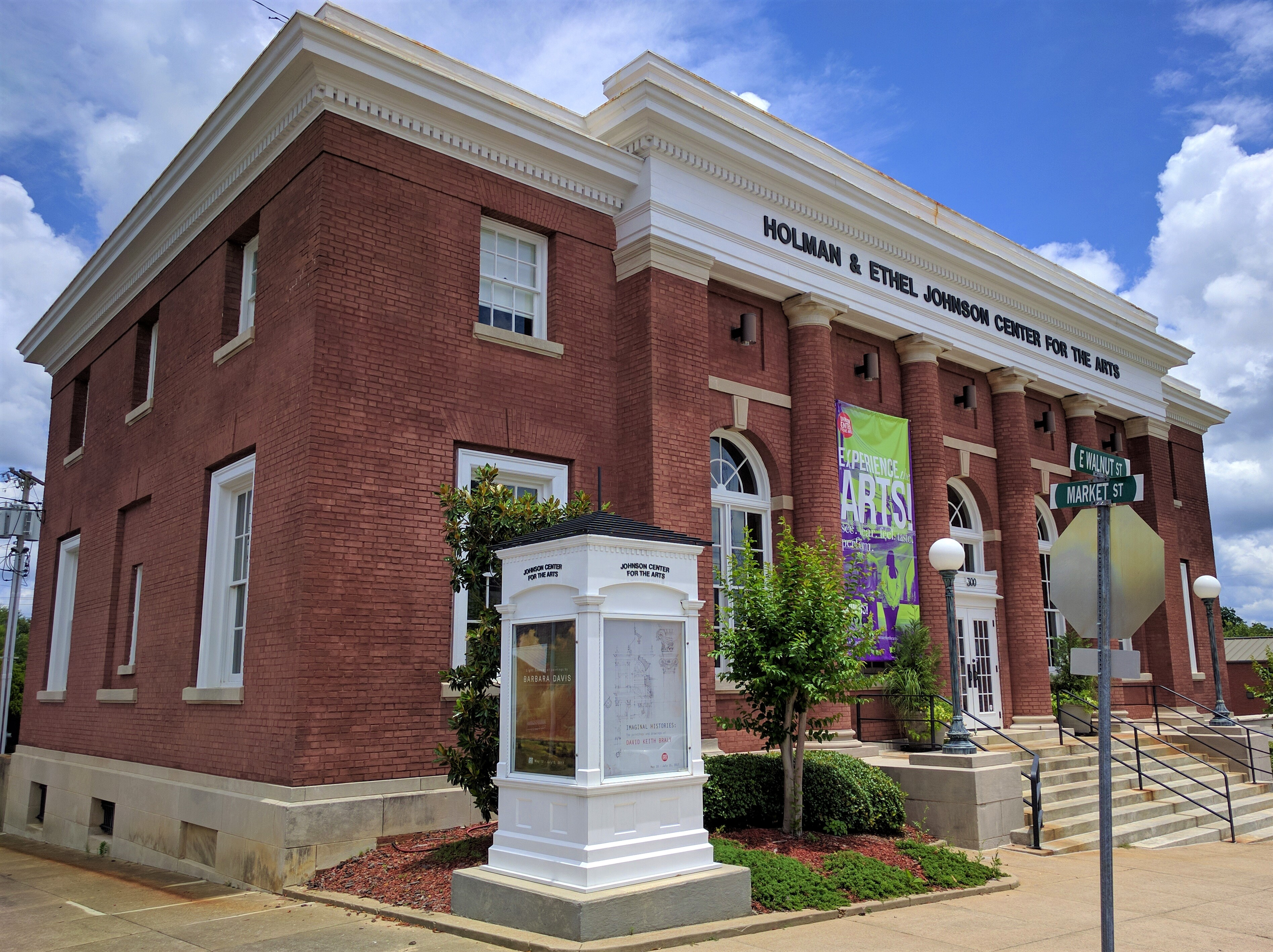
The old Troy Post Office (built 1920); now, the Johnson Center for the Arts

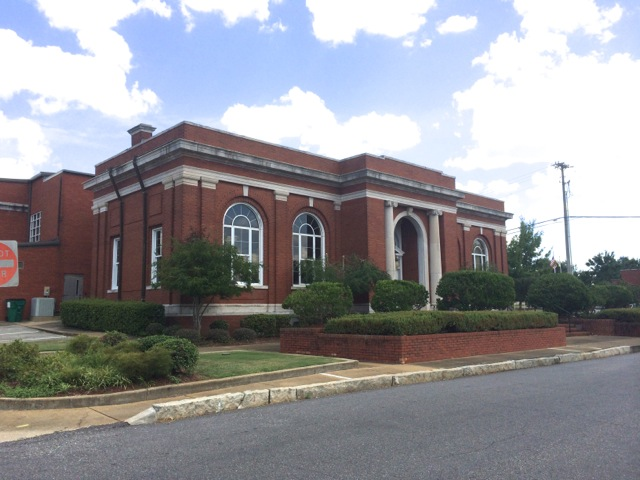
An original Carnegie Library (built 1908) located in Historic Downtown Troy; now, the Troy City Hall

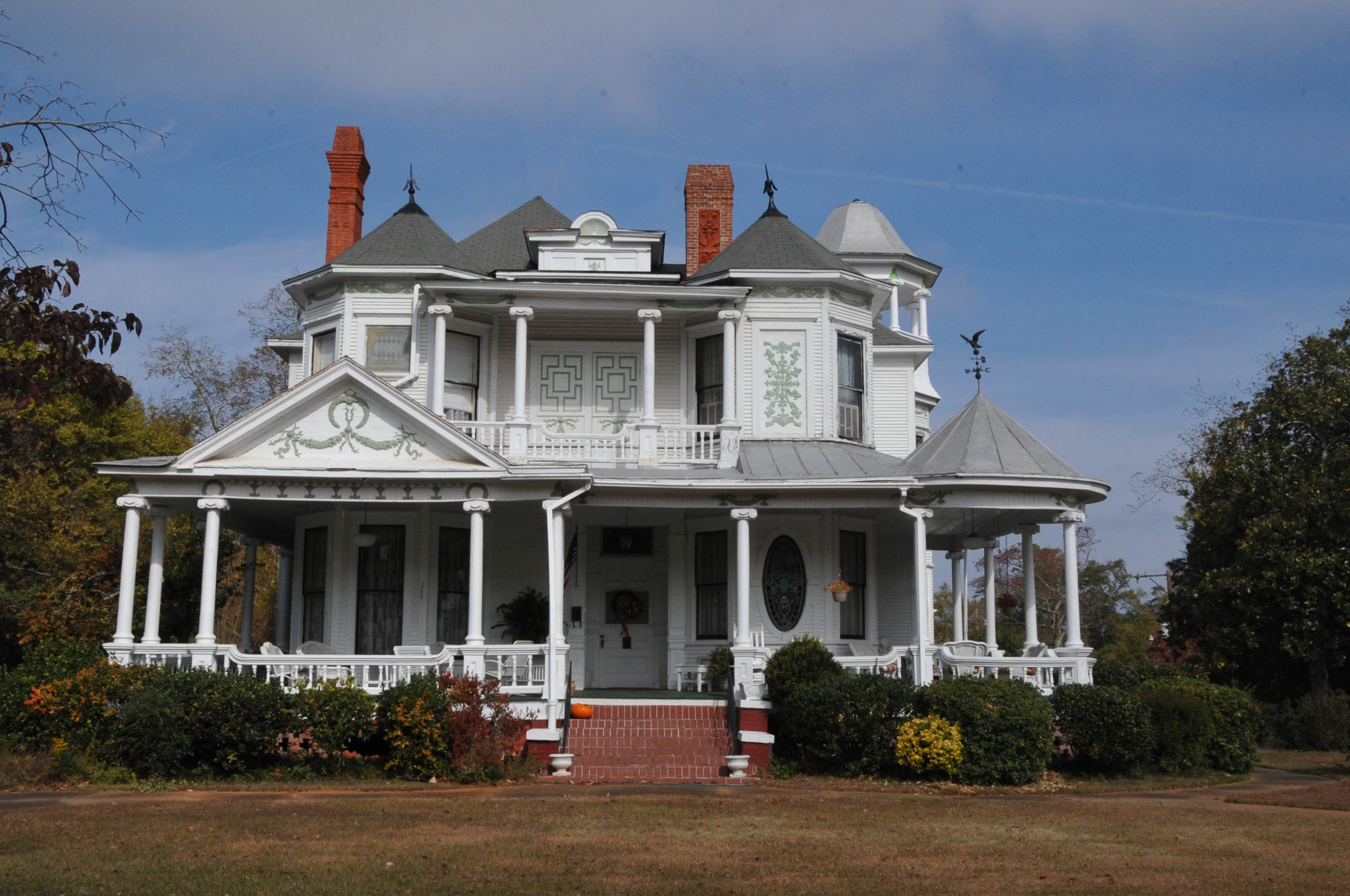
The Wood-Spann House on Historic College Street

During the Reconstruction Era after the end of the Civil War, Troy began to have new railroads and roads converging into the city. After the completion of the Mobile & Girard Railroad (later part of the Central of Georgia Railway) in 1870, Troy had a quick spike in population. One of the many to have made the journey to Troy was Jeremiah Augustus "Gus" Henderson. Having owned a large store in nearby Gainers Store (now known as Henderson), he found it difficult to transport and receive shipments by wagon. In 1869, Henry moved his mercantile store to nearby Troy to be closer to the Mobile and Girard Railroad. One of his sons, Charles Henderson, would soon be the governor of Alabama and a large contributor to Troy.

Troy had a quick period of growth in the following years. By 1890, the Alabama Midland Railway (later part of the Atlantic Coast Line Railroad) was completed from Montgomery to Bainbridge, Georgia, via Troy. Rapid growth outside of the Troy downtown square consisted of factories, churches, stores, and Victorian-style houses. Many of the early houses, churches, and cemeteries dating back to this era can still be found in the College Street Historic District, just on the edge of historic downtown Troy. Many of the buildings in the two-block area date from as early as the 1870s. The district was added to the National Register of Historic Places on August 13, 1976.

In 1887, a group of local educators and prominent citizens of Troy joined to acquire a state normal school (teacher training school) for Troy. Thanks mostly to the efforts of Ariosto A. Wiley, a powerful state senator who was born in Troy, the city won the education prize over Lowndesboro, Alabama, which had also wanted a normal school. The school, which was to be known as Troy Normal School, was eventually constructed and completed in 1887 in downtown Troy on a four-acre campus.

This school, which went on to become Troy University, had a stormy early history and was lucky to have survived in its cramped downtown location. Its survival was assured when the third president of the college, Edward Madison Shackelford, led the movement from downtown to its present site starting in 1924. In 1929, the name was changed to Troy State Teacher's College. The name was again changed in 1957 to Troy State College to reflect the expanded educational offerings of the school. The school was still segregated at that time. The college underwent yet another name change in 1967, being called Troy State University until reaching its current name, Troy University, in 2005.

Regarding the town's courthouse, a pre-Civil War structure was torn down in 1880 and a brick courthouse was erected. A hotel and taverns along with small mercantile stores were soon created, quickly making the town the social center of the county. Unfortunately, the town of Troy burned down in 1901 in a devastating fire. The courthouse, originally in the center of the town square, was demolished because of fire damage and relocated one block away.

== Geography ==
Troy is in the East Gulf Coastal Plains region of Alabama. It is located along the Troy Cuesta ridge, which runs across the state from east to west and is the boundary that separates the Chunnenuggee Hills and Southern Red Hills geographical boundaries. Elevations commonly reach 400 feet (120 m) in these hills and can reach up to 500 feet (150 m) in some areas. About 40 miles (64 km) north of Troy near the Montgomery area, the Chunnenuggee Hills region ends and the flat Black Prairie region begins, commonly known as the Black Belt region. About 60 miles (97 km) south of Troy in the Dothan area, the Southern Red Hills region ends and the Dougherty Plains region begins. Map

Much of the region consists of pine forests. Most tree species found in the area are pine, hickory, oak, pecan, and poplar. The 231-mi-long Conecuh River flows at the northern end of Troy. A 45-acre (18 ha) lake called Pike County Lake is located at the southern end of Troy.

According to the U.S. Census Bureau, the city has a total area of 26.3 square miles (68 km^{2}), of which 26.2 square miles (68 km^{2}) are land and 0.1 square miles (0.26 km^{2}) (0.34%) is covered by water.

=== Climate ===
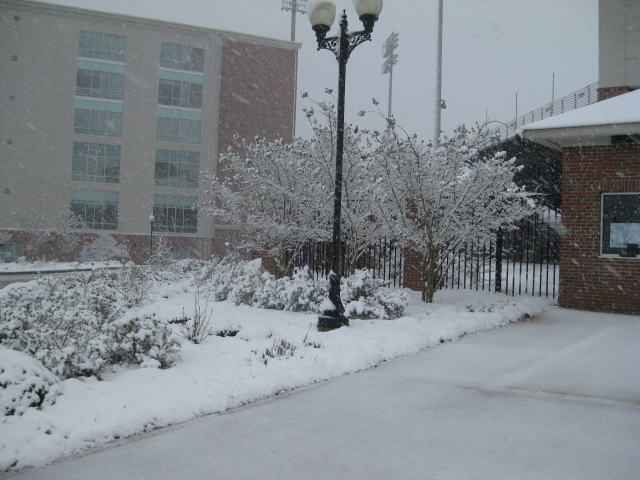
Snowstorm in Troy in 2010

Troy's climate is described as humid subtropical using Köppen climate classification. It is typical of areas along the Gulf of Mexico in that it has hot, humid summers and mild winters. (See table below for average temperatures for Troy.)

During the summer and fall, Troy is occasionally affected by tropical storms and hurricanes. The most recent major hurricanes to affect Troy have been Hurricane Opal, Hurricane Ivan, Hurricane Katrina, and Hurricane Sally. Thunderstorms occur throughout the summer, but are most severe in the spring and fall, when destructive winds and tornadoes occasionally occur.

The late winter occasionally brings very small sleet/snow showers, with a significant snow storm happening rarely. Deep winter is occasionally accompanied by a tornado touching down in the county. The last deep-winter tornado touched down in the county on Christmas Day, 2012. The last two big snow events to affect Troy were part of the 2010 Southern Snow event and 1993 Storm of the Century.

Climate data for Troy, Alabama (1991–2020 normals, extremes 1908–present)
Month	Jan	Feb	Mar	Apr	May	Jun	Jul	Aug	Sep	Oct	Nov	Dec	Year
Record high °F (°C)	83 (28)	85 (29)	92 (33)	97 (36)	102 (39)	108 (42)	107 (42)	107 (42)	108 (42)	103 (39)	89 (32)	82 (28)	108 (42)
Mean maximum °F (°C)	73.0 (22.8)	77.1 (25.1)	82.4 (28.0)	86.1 (30.1)	92.0 (33.3)	94.7 (34.8)	96.0 (35.6)	95.8 (35.4)	93.3 (34.1)	88.0 (31.1)	80.9 (27.2)	75.6 (24.2)	97.0 (36.1)
Mean daily maximum °F (°C)	58.1 (14.5)	62.6 (17.0)	69.9 (21.1)	76.8 (24.9)	83.8 (28.8)	88.6 (31.4)	90.6 (32.6)	89.9 (32.2)	86.6 (30.3)	78.1 (25.6)	67.9 (19.9)	60.7 (15.9)	76.1 (24.5)
Daily mean °F (°C)	47.6 (8.7)	51.5 (10.8)	58.0 (14.4)	64.6 (18.1)	72.5 (22.5)	78.7 (25.9)	80.9 (27.2)	80.3 (26.8)	76.4 (24.7)	66.9 (19.4)	56.3 (13.5)	50.2 (10.1)	65.3 (18.5)
Mean daily minimum °F (°C)	37.1 (2.8)	40.5 (4.7)	46.1 (7.8)	52.5 (11.4)	61.1 (16.2)	68.7 (20.4)	71.1 (21.7)	70.7 (21.5)	66.3 (19.1)	55.6 (13.1)	44.8 (7.1)	39.8 (4.3)	54.5 (12.5)
Mean minimum °F (°C)	20.6 (−6.3)	24.7 (−4.1)	29.3 (−1.5)	38.2 (3.4)	46.8 (8.2)	61.1 (16.2)	65.4 (18.6)	64.3 (17.9)	54.8 (12.7)	40.6 (4.8)	30.0 (−1.1)	25.3 (−3.7)	18.4 (−7.6)
Record low °F (°C)	−1 (−18)	9 (−13)	13 (−11)	29 (−2)	38 (3)	47 (8)	54 (12)	54 (12)	37 (3)	26 (−3)	12 (−11)	4 (−16)	−1 (−18)
Average precipitation inches (mm)	4.54 (115)	3.91 (99)	4.83 (123)	4.60 (117)	3.54 (90)	5.11 (130)	5.33 (135)	4.92 (125)	3.91 (99)	3.34 (85)	3.80 (97)	4.96 (126)	52.79 (1,341)
Average snowfall inches (cm)	0.0 (0.0)	0.0 (0.0)	0.0 (0.0)	0.0 (0.0)	0.0 (0.0)	0.0 (0.0)	0.0 (0.0)	0.0 (0.0)	0.0 (0.0)	0.0 (0.0)	0.0 (0.0)	0.1 (0.25)	0.1 (0.25)
Average precipitation days (≥ 0.01 in)	9.0	8.0	7.2	6.5	6.8	9.3	10.6	9.3	6.6	5.1	6.6	9.0	94.0
Average snowy days (≥ 0.1 in)	0.0	0.0	0.0	0.0	0.0	0.0	0.0	0.0	0.0	0.0	0.0	0.0	0.0
Source: NOAA (snow/snow days 1981–2010)

== Demographics ==
Historical population
Census	Pop.	Note	%±
1850	600		—
1870	1,058		—
1880	2,294		116.8%
1890	3,449		50.3%
1900	4,097		18.8%
1910	4,961		21.1%
1920	5,696		14.8%
1930	6,814		19.6%
1940	7,055		3.5%
1950	8,555		21.3%
1960	10,234		19.6%
1970	11,482		12.2%
1980	13,124		14.3%
1990	13,051		−0.6%
2000	13,935		6.8%
2010	18,033		29.4%
2020	17,727		−1.7%
U.S. Decennial Census

=== 2020 census ===
As of the 2020 census, Troy had a population of 17,727. The median age was 26.8 years. 16.4% of residents were under the age of 18 and 13.2% of residents were 65 years of age or older. For every 100 females, there were 82.0 males, and for every 100 females age 18 and over, there were 78.5 males age 18 and over.

80.0% of residents lived in urban areas, while 20.0% lived in rural areas.

There were 7,248 households in Troy, including 3,227 families, and 23.8% of households had children under the age of 18 living in them. Of all households, 29.2% were married-couple households, 24.1% were households with a male householder and no spouse or partner present, and 41.9% were households with a female householder and no spouse or partner present. About 37.4% of all households were made up of individuals, and 10.6% had someone living alone who was 65 years of age or older.

There were 8,266 housing units, of which 12.3% were vacant. The homeowner vacancy rate was 1.3% and the rental vacancy rate was 12.5%.

Troy racial composition
Race	Num.	Perc.
White (non-Hispanic)	9,054	51.07%
Black or African American (non-Hispanic)	7,028	39.65%
Native American	62	0.35%
Asian	509	2.87%
Pacific Islander	3	0.02%
Other/Mixed	610	3.44%
Hispanic or Latino	461	2.6%

=== 2010 census ===
As of the census of 2010, 18,003 people, 7,844 households, and 3,187 families were residing in the city. The population density was 531.1 inhabitants per square mile (205.1/km^{2}). The 6,436 housing units averaged 245.3 per sq mi (94.7/km^{2}). The racial makeup of the city was 55.00% White, 39.01% African American, 0.40% Native American, 3.36% Asian, 0.82% from other races, and 1.38% from two or more races. About 1.97% of the population were Hispanics or Latinos of any race.

Of the 7,844 households, 20.34% had children under the age of 18 living with them, 36.6% were married couples living together, 17.2% had a female householder with no husband present, and 42.9% were not families. About 33.4% of all households were made up of individuals, and 11.1% had someone living alone who was 65 years of age or older. The average household size was 2.28, and the average family size was 2.98.

In the city, the age distribution was 18.30% under 18, 21.97% from 20 to 24, 12.30% from 25 to 34, 14.04% from 35 to 49, 13.68% from 50 to 64, and 10.05% who were 65 or older. The median age was 27 years. For every 100 females, there were 86.0 males. For every 100 females age 18 and over, there were 81.8 males. Of the reported population, 78.2% were born in Alabama. The percentage of foreign-born residents was 2.8%, and 16.2% of those individuals were naturalized citizens.

The median income for a household in the city was $25,352, and for a family was $39,601. Males had a median income of $29,190 versus $20,368 for females. The per capita income for the city was $15,589. About 17.7% of families and 23.5% of the population were below the poverty line, including 27.5% of those under age 18 and 19.8% of those age 65 or over.

== Education ==
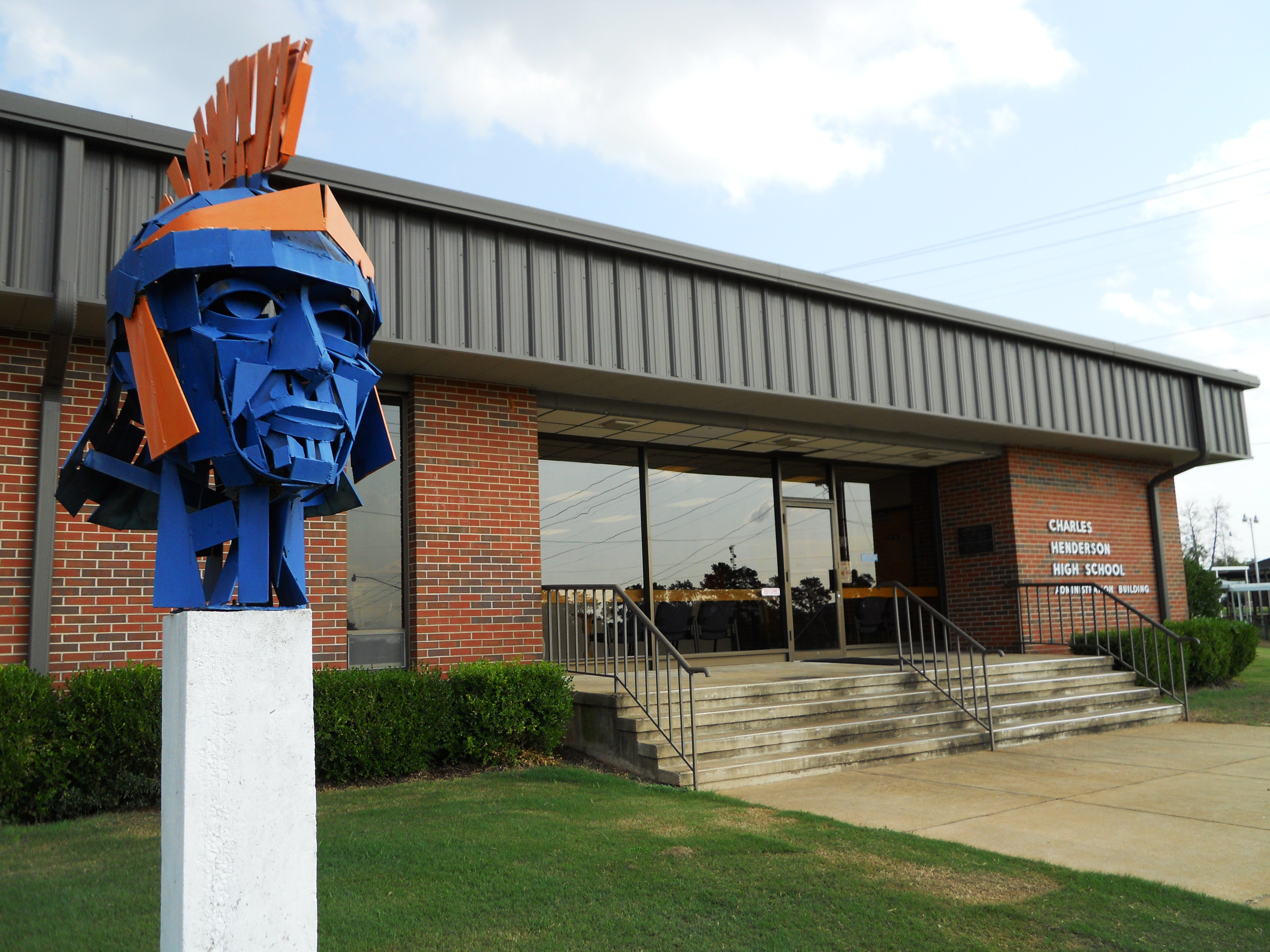
Charles Henderson High School

=== Primary and secondary schools ===
==== Public schools ====
- Charles Henderson High School
- Charles Henderson Middle School
- Troy Elementary School
- Troy-Pike Center for Technology

==== Private schools ====
- Pike Liberal Arts School
- Covenant Christian School
- Collegedale Christian School
- New Life Christian Academy

=== Higher education ===
- Troy University

== Culture ==
Troy was selected as the 2010 Corporate Investment and Community Impact Award Winner by Trade and Industry Development, describing Troy as being on the cutting edge of economic development.

Troy was also listed as one of "The Top 50 Best College Towns to Live in Forever" by CollegeRanker.com in 2016.

=== TroyFest ===
Originally called the Jean Lake Memorial Art Show, this arts festival was started in 1982 and has been an annual attraction since. Named for Jean Lake, a popular Southern artist who was from Troy, the festival is held in the downtown square of Troy yearly, combining local art shows and showcasing the region's best artists. In 2001, TroyFest was named the "Official Year of Alabama Art Event." Today, the festival continues to be recognized as a top emerging art show by many art show review publications and is a "Top 10 Event by the Alabama Bureau of Travel and Tourism." The artwork of Jean Lake is still exhibited all over the world today. She continues to be recognized as the namesake of the festival and the exclusive scholarship that is awarded each year to a high-school senior pursuing the arts.

=== Troy Pioneer Days ===
Every year, the Pioneer Museum of Alabama hosts Troy Pioneer Days. This event features horse and wagon rides, trips on the Pioneer Express, and Native American camps with demonstrations of candlemaking, spinning, weaving, quiltmaking, blacksmithing, drum, and dance.

=== Pike Piddlers Storytelling Festival ===
Started in 2006, the festival traditionally features some of the top storytellers in the country. Performers who have routinely taken part in the annual festival include nationally known Donald Davis, Kevin Kling, Carmen Agra Deedy, Elizabeth Ellis, Andy Offutt Irwin, Bil Lepp, and Kathryn Tucker Windham. The Pike Piddlers Storytelling Festival features preshow music by traditional musicians prior to each storytelling concert, featuring different genres such as bluegrass, country, jazz, and Southern gospel music. The festival opens at the We Piddle Around Theater in Brundidge, Alabama before moving to the Trojan Center Theater on the campus of Troy University for three storytelling concerts.

=== Alabama Torch Run for Special Olympics ===
The Alabama Law Enforcement Torch Run is held every May to coincide with the Alabama Special Olympics State Games. The run starts out in north Alabama on Thursday and then makes its way south, stopping in the Birmingham area overnight and then on to Montgomery and Troy. The State Games Opening Ceremony convenes on Friday evening in Troy University's Veterans Memorial Stadium. The event features the Flame of Hope being carried into the stadium by members of the agencies that participate in the Cops on Top fund-raising campaign. Over 50 uniformed officers and deputies form a rank along the front of the stage as the flame passes through.

== Economy ==
The largest employers in the Troy micropolitan area are Troy University, Lockheed Martin, Sikorsky Aircraft, CGI Group, the Wal-Mart distribution center in nearby Brundidge, Alabama, and the various branches of Sanders Lead, Wiley Sanders Truck Lines, and KW Plastics operations. Troy University's main campus, located in Troy, employs about 700 faculty and staff.

=== Major employers ===
- Troy University
- Walmart Distribution Center
- City of Troy
- CGI Group
- Lockheed Martin Operations Facility
- Sikorsky Aircraft Corporation
- Wayne Farms
- AirTek Inc.
- Troy Regional Medical Center
- Horn Beverage Company, a Budweiser distribution facility
- HB&G Architectural Columns
- Sanders Lead Company
- Wiley Sanders Truck Lines, Inc.
- KW Plastics
- Golden Boy Foods, Ltd.
- Southern Classic Food Group
- Supreme Oil Company
- TroyCable
- Kimber Firearms Manufacturing (headquarters)
- Rex Lumber Company
- Conecuh Ridge Whiskey Distillery

== Government ==
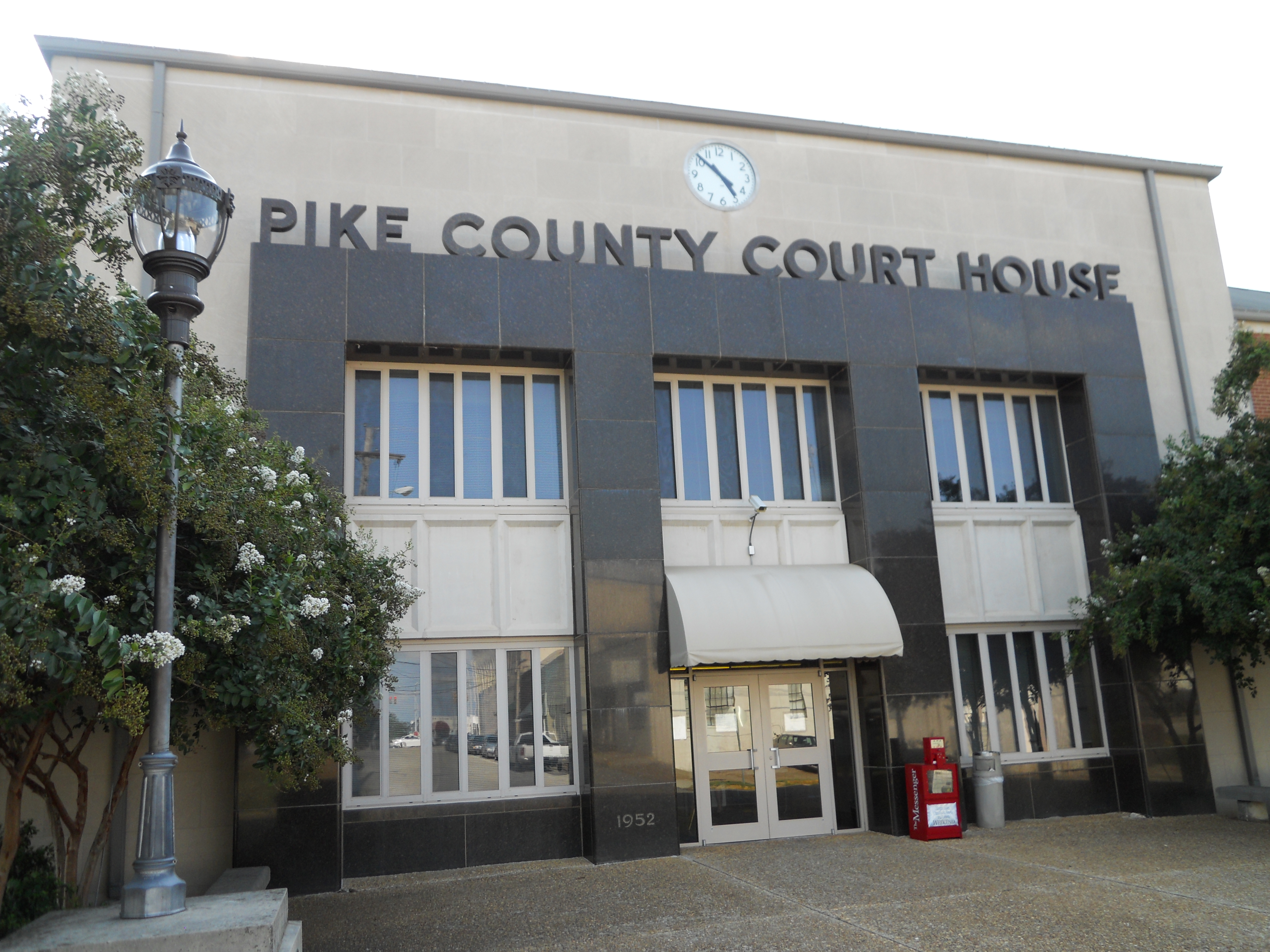
The Pike County Court House in downtown Troy

Troy operates under a mayor-council government system. The city is served by a mayor, who is elected at-large, and a five-member city council, which is composed of five single-member districts. Former mayor Jimmy C. Lunsford was elected to his first term in 1985. He won re-election each year since, until his retirement in 2012, and is the longest-serving mayor in Troy history.

== Infrastructure ==
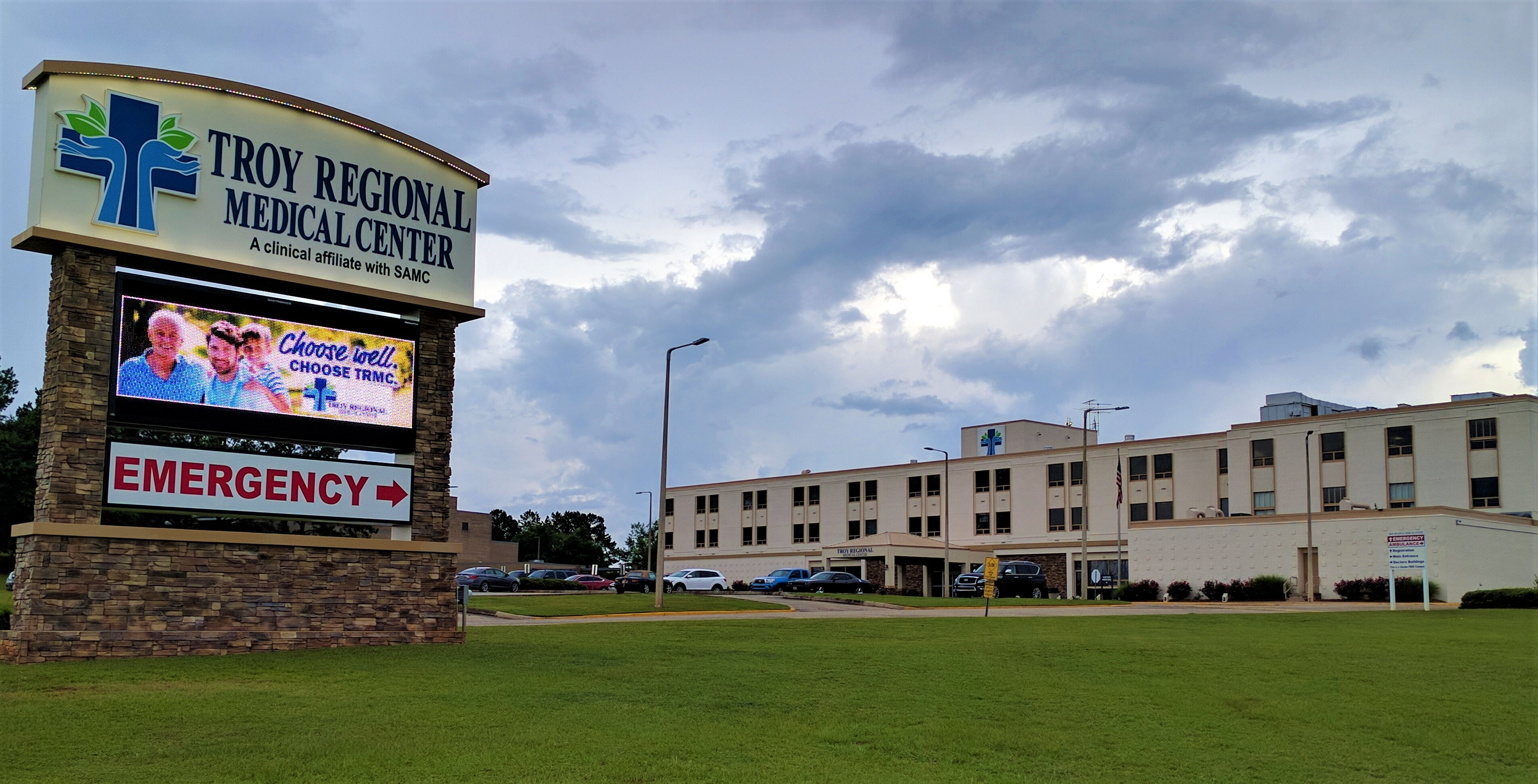
Troy Regional Medical Center

=== Medical centers ===
- Troy Regional Medical Center
- Charles Henderson Child Health Center
- SARHA Doctors Center
- Pike Internal Medicine

=== Transportation ===
==== Bus services ====
Troy and Pike County offer various bus transportation services:

- Greyhound Lines Bus Station
- Pike County Transportation System (operates on weekdays by reservation only)
- Troy University Transportation System (for university students and employees only)

==== Airports ====
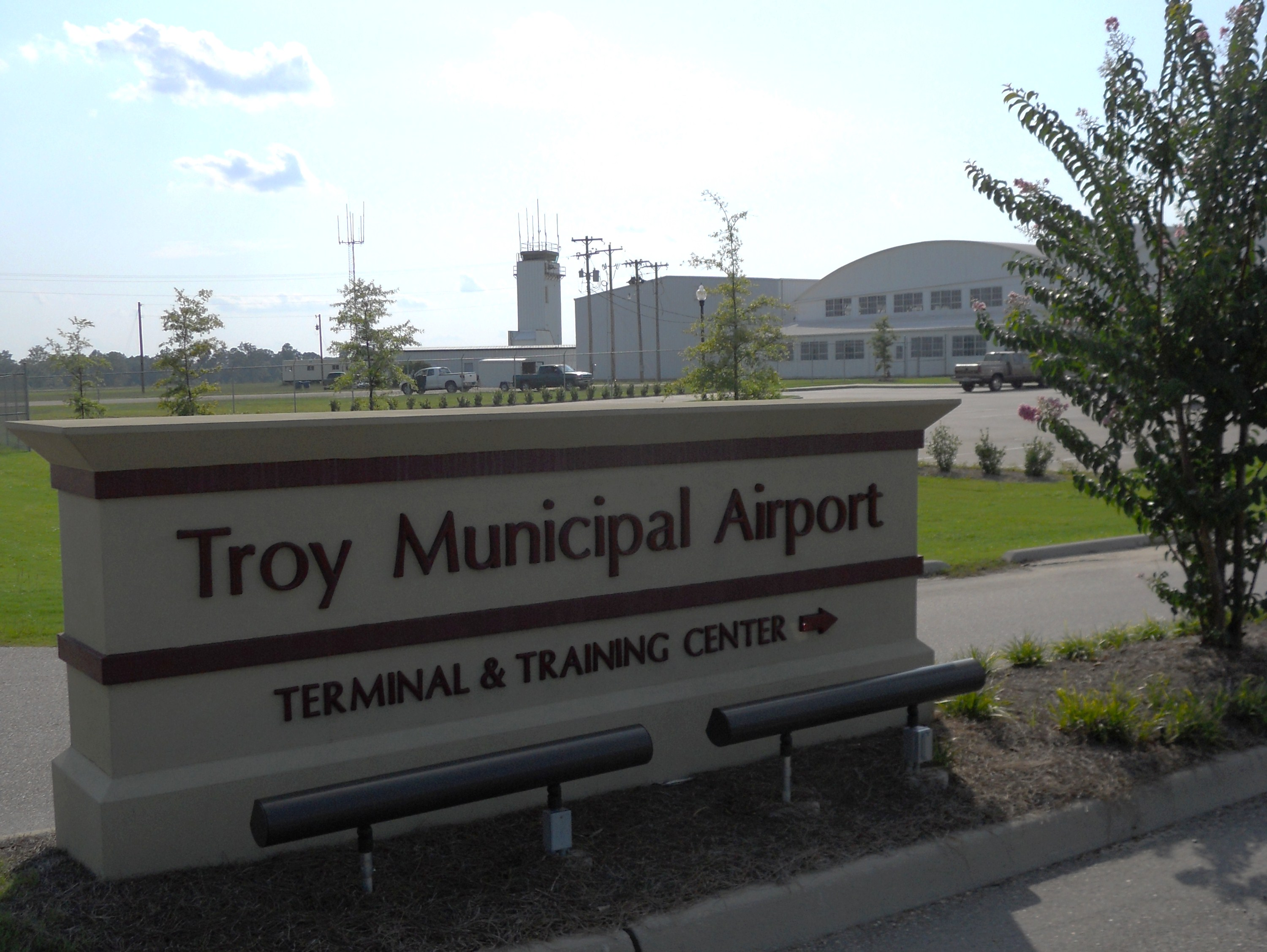
Troy Municipal Airport.

About 5 miles north of Troy is the Troy Municipal Airport, which can accommodate general aviation, but not commercial flights. Most travelers use the nearby Montgomery Regional Airport, which is located 51 miles to the north and is served by two commercial airlines, or the Dothan Regional Airport, which is located 50 miles to the southeast and is served by one commercial airline. Troy is about 2.5 hours north by highway from the major Northwest Florida Beaches International Airport, and about 3 hours southwest by highway from the major Hartsfield–Jackson Atlanta International Airport.

The airport was originally opened in 1942 during World War II as an auxiliary air field to Maxwell Air Force Base in nearby Montgomery. The air field has since been designated as a general-aviation airport. The tower and radar facilities are currently run by U.S. Army air traffic controllers. The airport allows for private jets to fly in, and is dominated by student pilots flying TH-67 helicopters from nearby Fort Novosel.

==== Highways ====
The nearest interstates to Troy are Interstate 65, which is located 40 miles west of Troy, and Interstate 85, which is 45 miles north. U.S. highway 231 is the city's main thoroughfare, which connects nearby Montgomery, Alabama to Panama City Beach, Florida. U.S. 29, which travels through downtown Troy, is known as Historic Three Notch Street. Troy is served by three state routes - Alabama Highways 87, 167, and 10.

U.S. Routes:

- U.S. Route 231
- U.S. Route 29

State Routes:

- State Route 87
- State Route 167
- State Route 10

==== Rail ====
Rail service for freight is provided by Conecuh Valley Railroad and CSX.

== Media ==
=== In popular culture ===
Troy was the filming location of the Kid Rock song "Redneck Paradise", featuring Hank Williams Jr. Both music artists have residences in Troy. The bar scene in the music video was shot at the Double Branch Bar in Troy, which has existed for over 50 years.

During the early years of the bar, Hank Williams Sr.'s band, the Drifting Cowboys, could be seen there. In the 1960s, Billboard Hot 100 artist Bobby Purify of James & Bobby Purify took the stage at the Double Branch. Dean Daughtry from Classics IV and the Atlanta Rhythm Section was seen playing the bar in the 1970s, among other well-known artists.

=== Newspaper ===
- Troy Messenger (one of the oldest newspapers in Alabama, established 1866)
- The Tropolitan (Troy University paper)

=== Radio stations ===
- WTBF (FM)/94.7 Talk/Personality/Oldies
- WZHT (FM)/105.7 Urban Contemporary/Hip-Hop
- WAXU (FM)/91.1 Christian
- WTSU (FM)/89.9 Classical music
- WTBF (AM)/970 Talk/Personality

=== Television stations ===
- WIYC
- Troy TrojanVision
- Studio 52

== Notable people ==
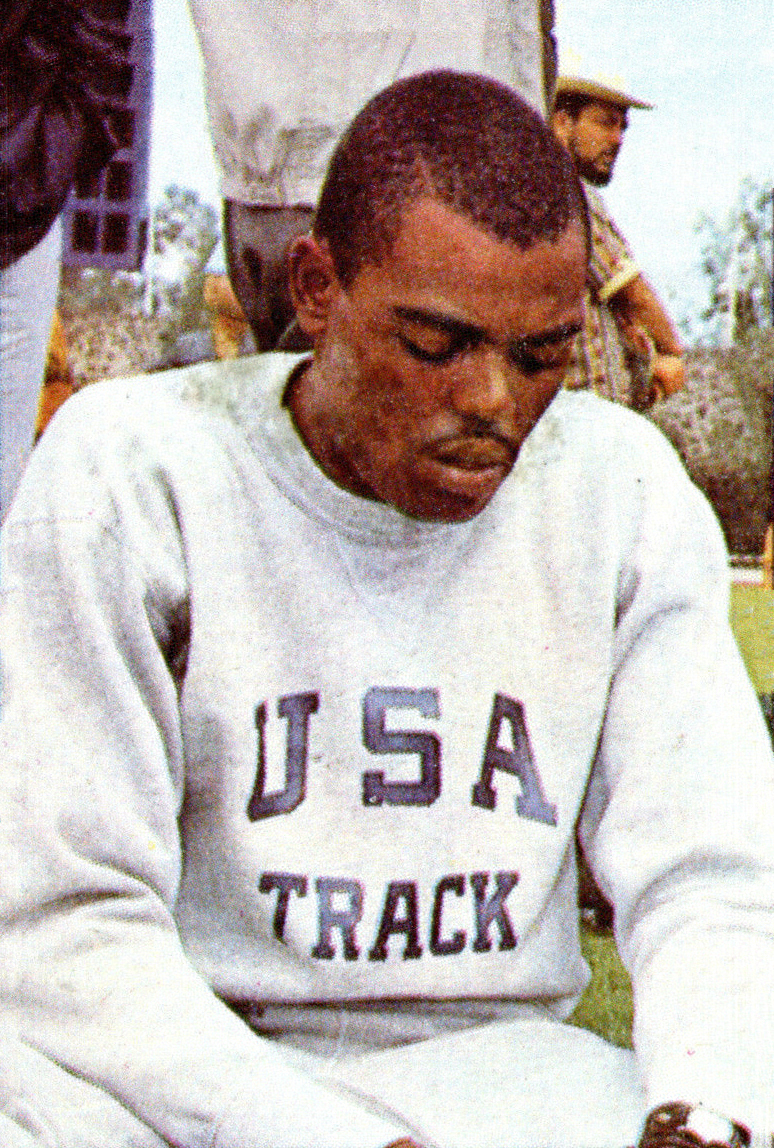
Olympic gold-medalist Willie Davenport was born and raised in Troy

- Wes Allen, Alabama Secretary of State
- Robert H. Bennett, politician
- J. Richard Blankenship was a United States Ambassador to the Bahamas.
- Major General Gwen Bingham was commander of the White Sands Missile Range.
- John Crawley, jurist
- Willie Davenport, Olympic medalist sprinter
- William J. Dyess, former U.S. Assistant Secretary of State for Public Affairs and United States Ambassador to the Netherlands
- Jesse Hill Ford, Southern literature writer
- George M. Grant, former U.S. Congressman for the 2nd District of Alabama
- Cornelius Griffin, former NFL defensive tackle
- Charles Henderson, 35th governor of Alabama
- Fox Henderson, businessman and banking entrepreneur
- Fred Nall Hollis, artist
- Manuel H. Johnson, economist
- John Lewis, American civil rights leader and former U.S. Representative
- William Lundy is claimed to be one of the last living Confederate veterans of the American Civil War.
- C. Steven McMillan, CEO of Sara Lee Corporation from 2000 to 2005
- Brian Meadows, Major League Baseball player
- Max Rafferty, academic
- Jean Sasson, author
- Clarence "Pine Top" Smith, inventor of boogie woogie music, pianist
- Art Stringer, former linebacker for the Houston Oilers
- Henry A. Wiley, Commander-in-Chief, United States Fleet, 1927-1929
- Oliver C. Wiley, U.S. Representative
- A. N. Worthy, doctor and state legislator

== Points of interest ==
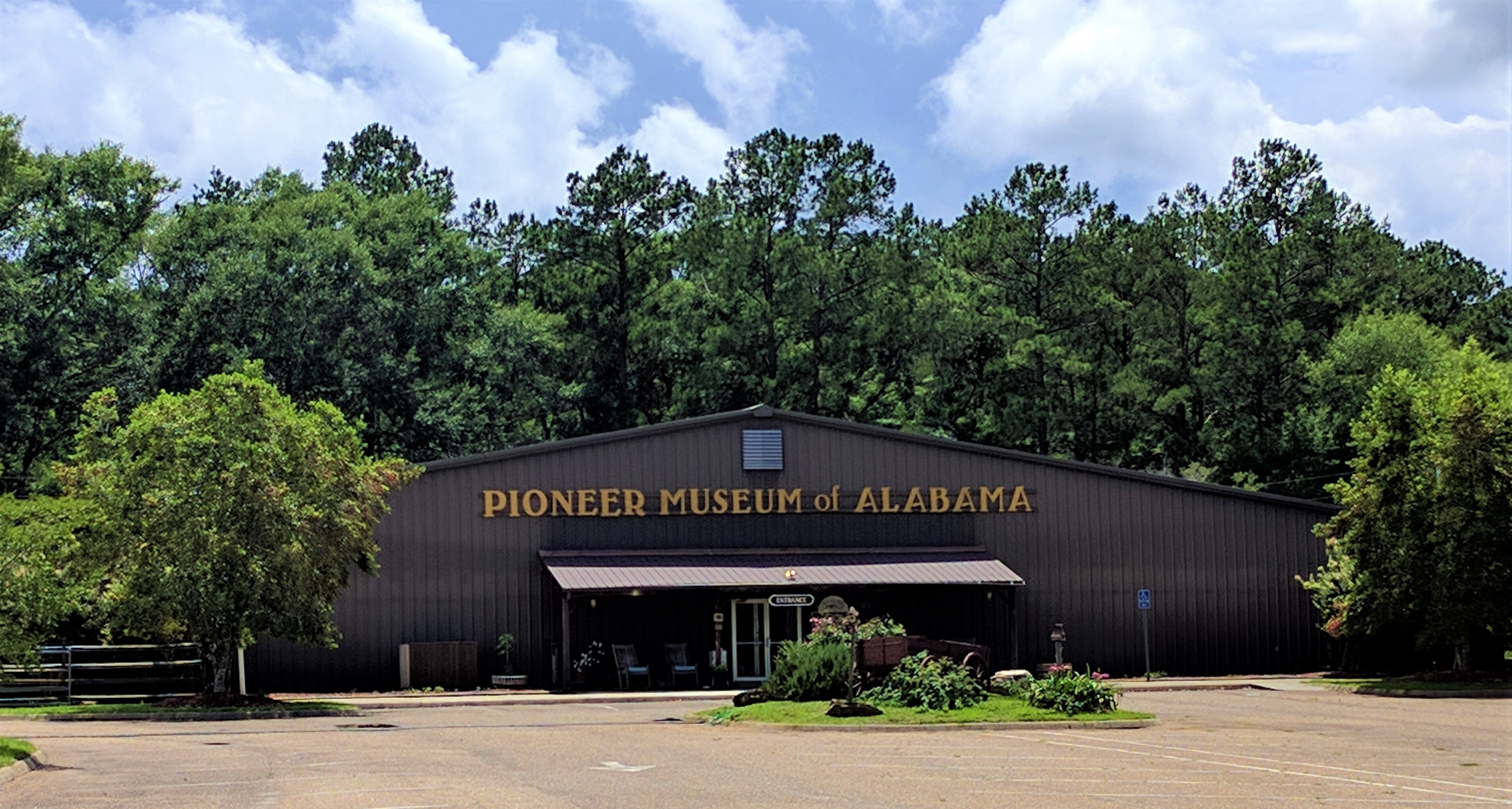
The Pioneer Museum of Alabama

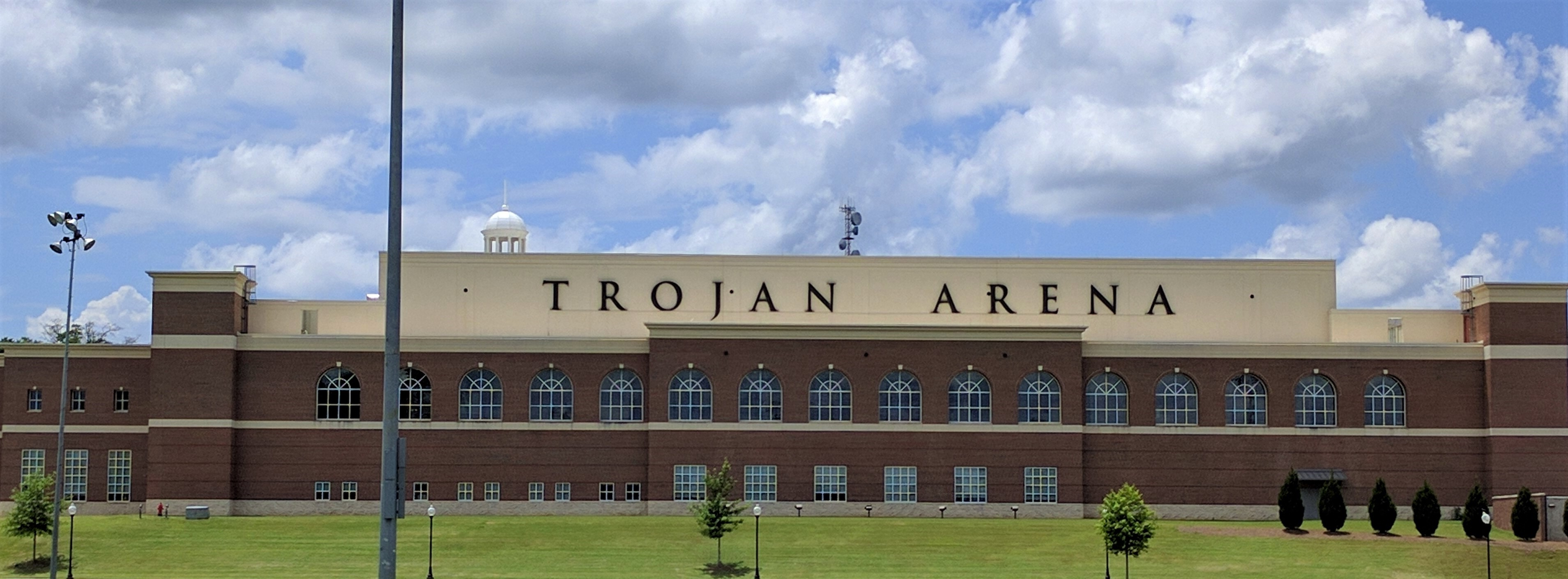
Trojan Arena

- Troy University
- College Street Historic District
- Troy University Arboretum and Pocosin Nature Preserve
- Pioneer Museum of Alabama
- National Band Association Hall of Fame
- Johnson Center for the Arts
- Troy University International Art Center
- Pike County Lake and Fishing Dock
- Heart of Dixie Trail Ride
- Town Square Confederate Memorial Monument
- Troy-Pike Cultural Arts Center
- Troy Recreation Center
- Troy SportsPlex
- Bicentennial Park
- Murphree Park

== Gallery ==
Troy, Alabama Gallery
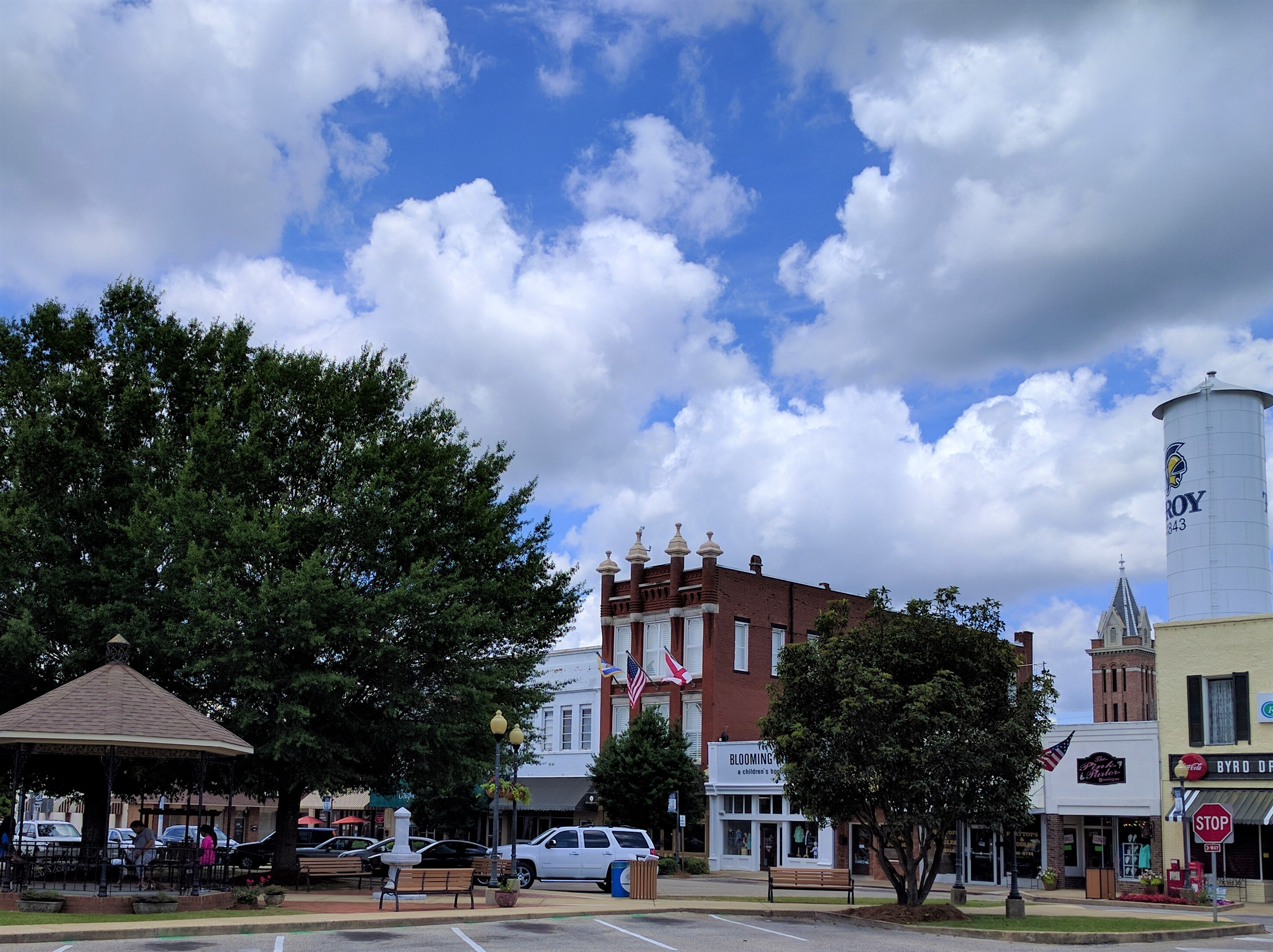
A view of historic downtown Troy

A Norman Rockwell painting on the side of Byrd Drugs in downtown Troy

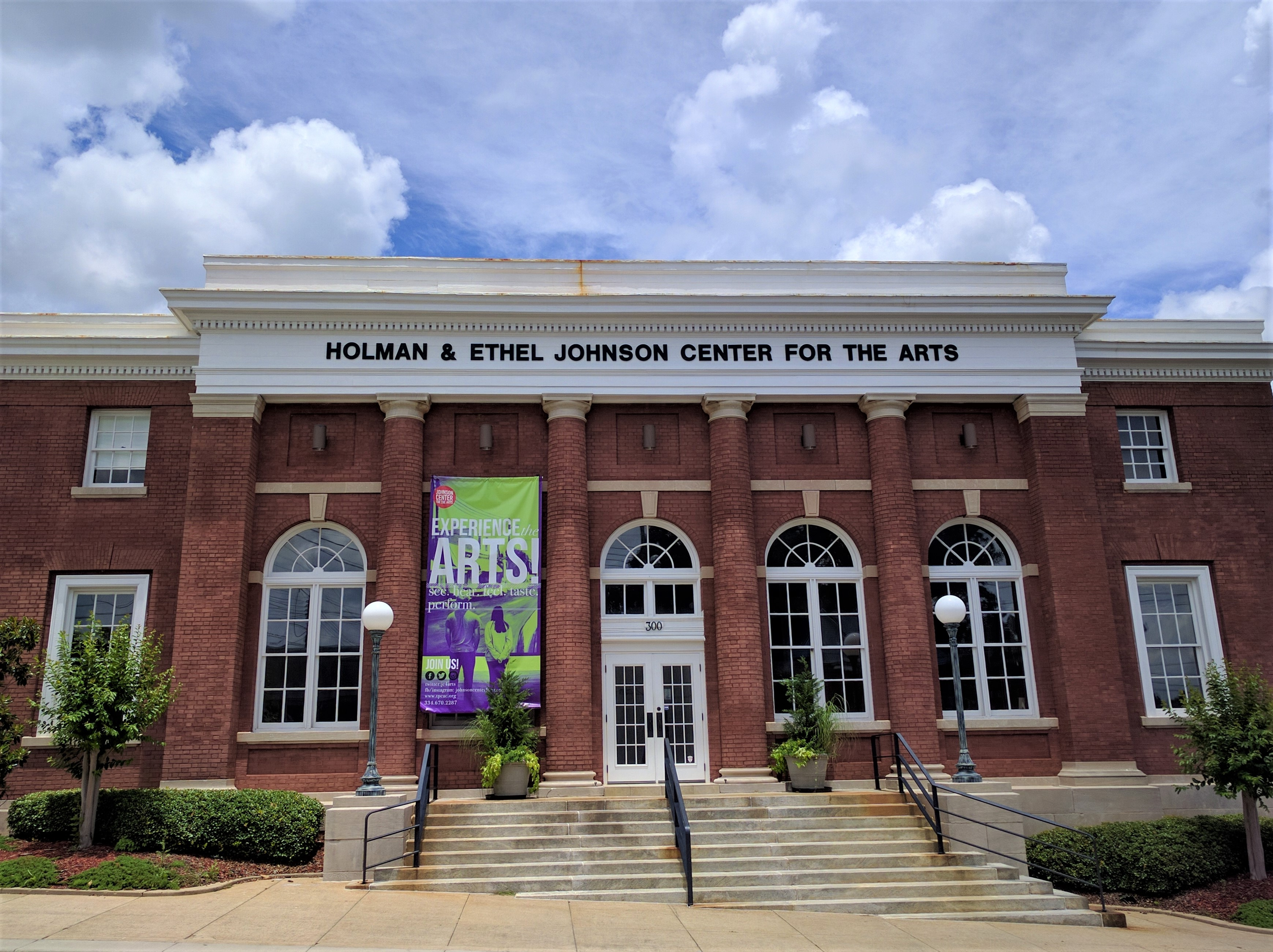
The Johnson Center for the Arts

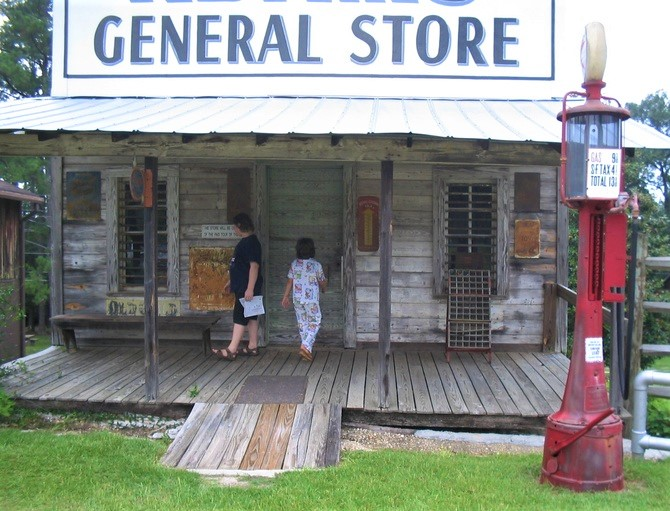
The old Adams General Store at the Pioneer Museum

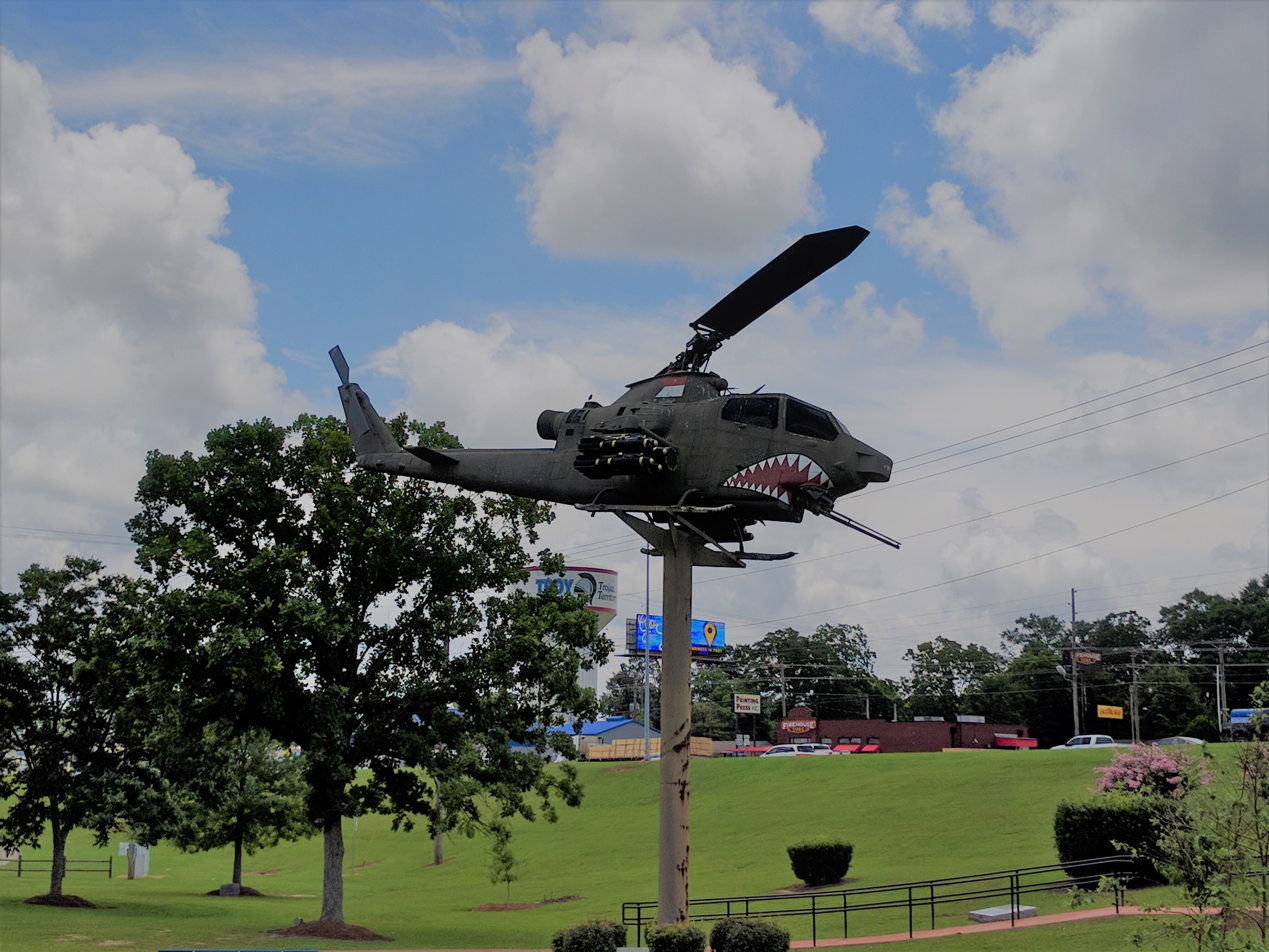
A Bell AH-1 SuperCobra in Bicentennial Park

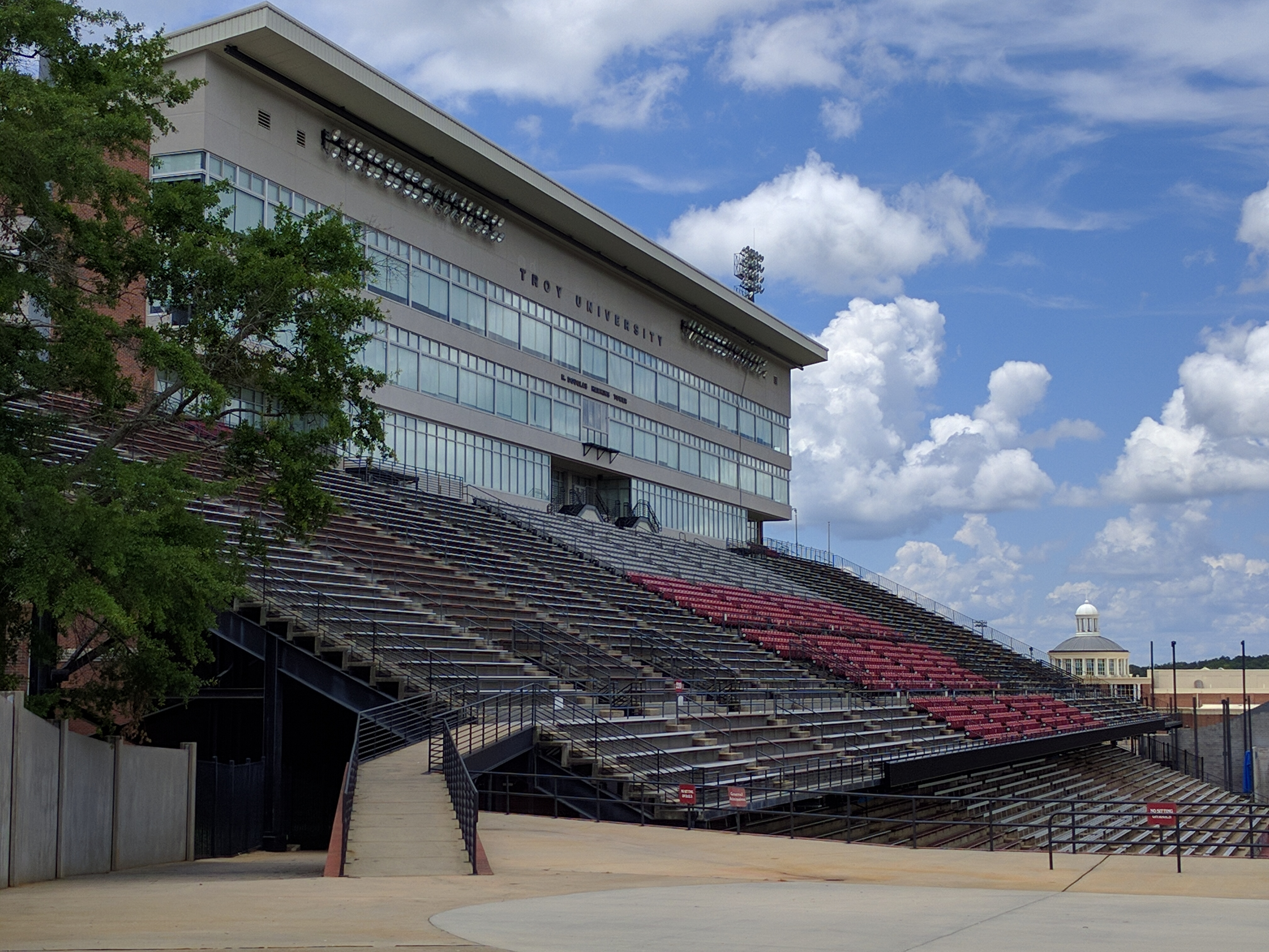
A view of Veterans Memorial Stadium
