= Battle of Pea River =

Battle of the 2nd Creek War

- Part of Second Creek War
Date	March 27, 1837
Location	Near Louisville, Alabama; Near Troy, Alabama
Result	U.S. victory

Belligerents
Muscogee Creeks	United States

Commanders and leaders
Unknown	William Wellborn

Strength
400 Creeks	250 militiamen

Casualties and losses
50 killed, multiple wounded	5 killed, multiple wounded

The Battle of Pea River was fought between the Alabama Militia and the Creek Indians during the Second Creek War, in the vicinity of the present-day Pike County, Alabama, roughly 17 miles east of Troy, Alabama in the United States.

== Background ==
Many Creek Indians in central and south Alabama were being forced off their lands that were guaranteed to them by the United States. The Creeks, angry that the land that had been promised to them was being taken from them by local settlers by violent force. A band of about 400 Creeks responded by burning local homes and plantations along the Pea River swamp as they moved south. Even the Three Notch Trail that traversed through Troy was considered dangerous at this point, as other local Creek Indians around the area were turning violent and burning and looting houses along the stretch of road.

In response to the threat by the Creeks, a force of over 250 combined Alabama and Georgia militiamen led under U.S. General William Wellborn tracked the band of 400 Creeks that included men, women, and children. The path of the Creeks had become easy to find due to the several looted and burned plantations they had left behind them as they moved south.

== Battle ==
The battle occurred on March 27, 1837, roughly 17 miles to the east of Troy, where the Pea River and Pea Creek converge near Hobdy's Bridge. After General Wellborn found the temporary camp that the Creeks had set up in a nearby swamp, he divided his command into two wings to encircle the Creeks. He personally commanded one wing, and placed the other under U.S. Colonel Jefferson Buford. The Creeks detected the approach, however, and attacked and scattered Colonel Buford's wing.

When Wellborn's command neared the camp, trudging through waist-high water, they could hear gunfire erupting further down the river. Wellborn immediately ordered his men through the mud and water at a full run. Upon encountering the Creeks downstream, a fierce four-hour battle began on opposite sides of a nearby lagoon. The Creek warriors, many of whom were later found to have been using bullets made of melted pewter plates, made several unsuccessful charges on the militia's line before being overrun. Records from some of the participants in the battle reported that some of the Creek women and children also took up arms to fight, raining showers of rifle balls and arrows on the militiamen. In one case, two of the Creek women attacked a member of the militia with knives. Unable to defeat the desperate Creeks with gunfire alone, Wellborn finally ordered a direct charge on their lines. The tactic worked as many of the Creeks fled to their encampment to carry off their children, some even swimming the river in order to flee. As the fighting was drawing to an end and many of the Creeks began to flee, the scene then devolved into a massacre among the Creek Indians.

== Aftermath ==
Reports show that at least fifty Creek men, women and children were killed and an unknown number captured. The Creek survivors continued their flight south in small groups. According to some reports, some of the captured Creeks were enslaved by local planters. Only five Americans were killed, among them General Wellborn's teenage son, James H. Wellborn.

In winning the Battle of Pea River & Pea Creek, Wellborn had defeated the refugee Creeks but had failed to surround and capture all of them as he had hoped. Instead they fled south down the Pea River to its confluence with the Choctawhatchee River and continued across the line into Florida. Furious at their treatment, they continued to battle the local populace for years to come.

The Battle of Pea River is the last recorded battle of Second Creek War, as the war with the Creeks shifted south to Florida where the eventual Second Seminole War would take place.
