= College Street Historic District (Troy, Alabama) =

Historic district in Alabama, United States

- U.S. National Register of Historic Places
- U.S. Historic district
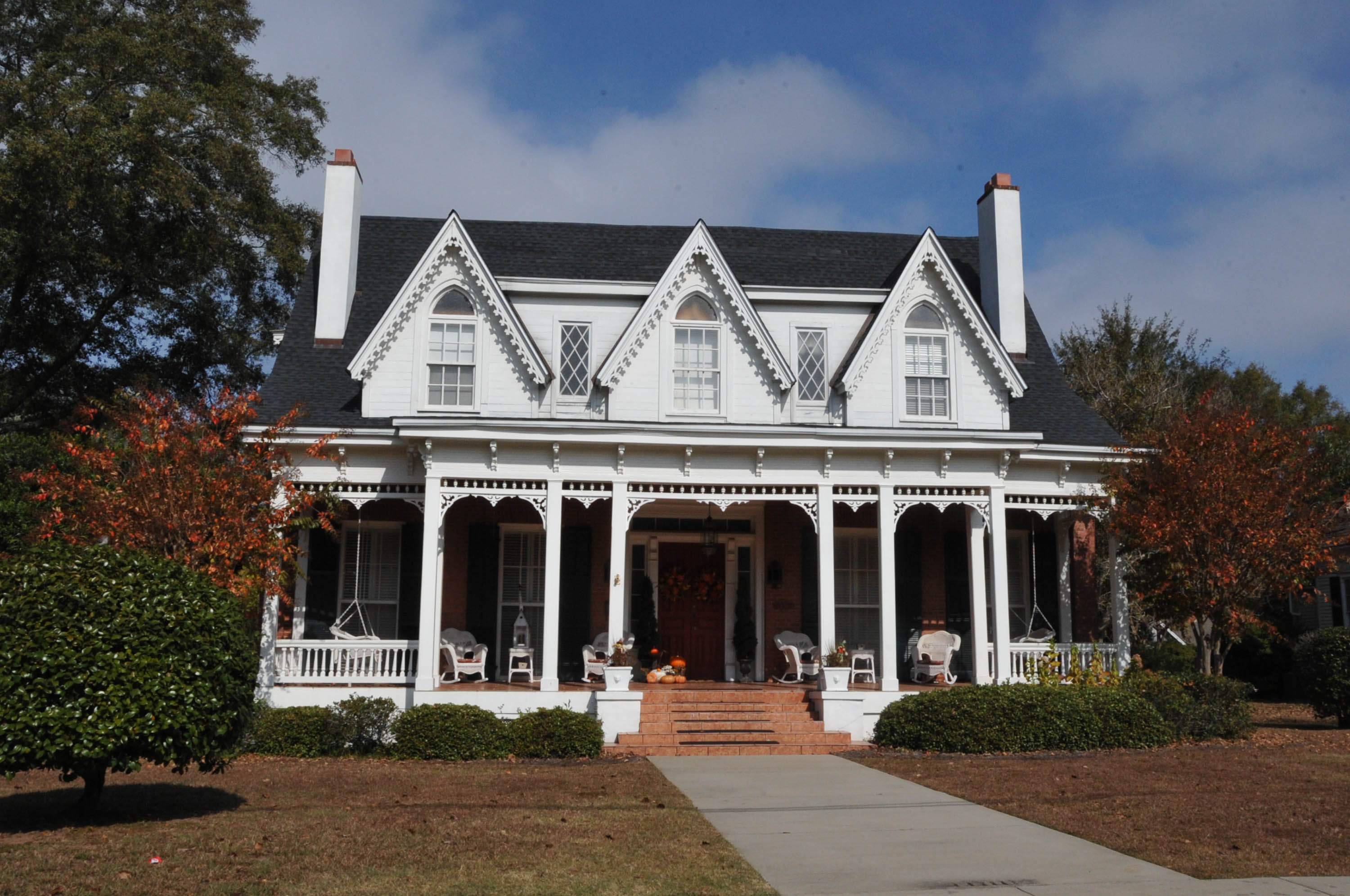
- Murphree House, built in the 1870s

- Location within Alabama Location within the United States
- Location: West College Street between Pine and Cherry Streets, Troy, Alabama
- Coordinates: 31°48′35″N 85°58′31″W
- Area: 15.5 acres (6.3 ha)
- Built: 1880
- Architectural style: Mid-19th Century Revival, Late Victorian, Mixed
- NRHP reference No.: 76000352
- Added to NRHP: August 13, 1976

The College Street Historic District is a historic district in Troy, Alabama. The district encompasses West College Street between Pine Street and Cherry Street. The district covers 15.5 acres (6.3 ha) and comprises 19 contributing properties, including 17 houses, a church, and a cemetery. Buildings in the two-block area date from as early as the 1870s, although some houses were built off of older homes. The district contains only one house built since the 1920s, keeping intact the historic character of the neighborhood. Architectural styles include Second Empire, Late Victorian, Queen Anne, and Greek Revival.

The district was added to the National Register of Historic Places on August 13, 1976.

== Gallery ==
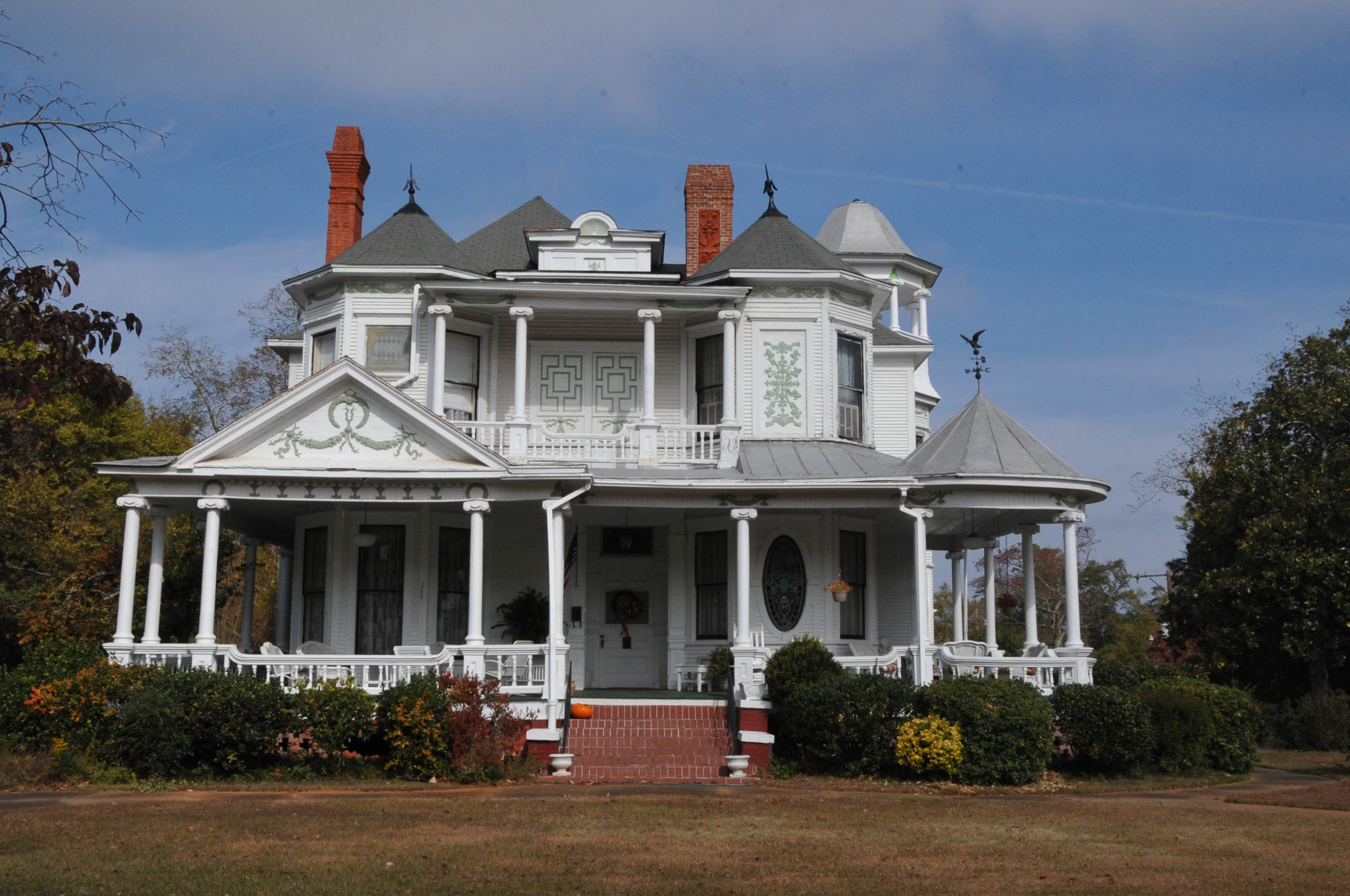
Wood-Spann House, c. 1895

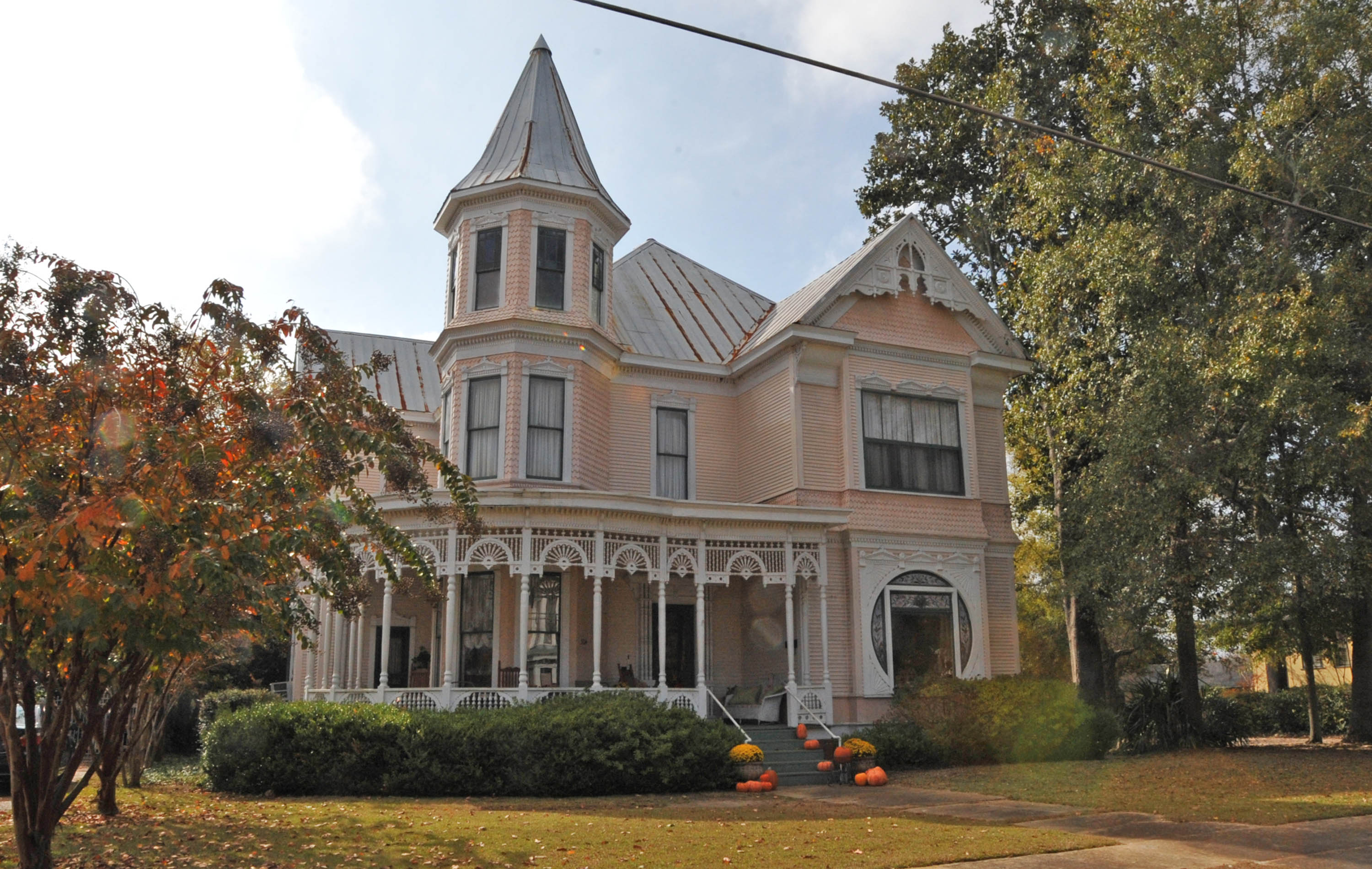
Henderson-Denison House, late 19th century

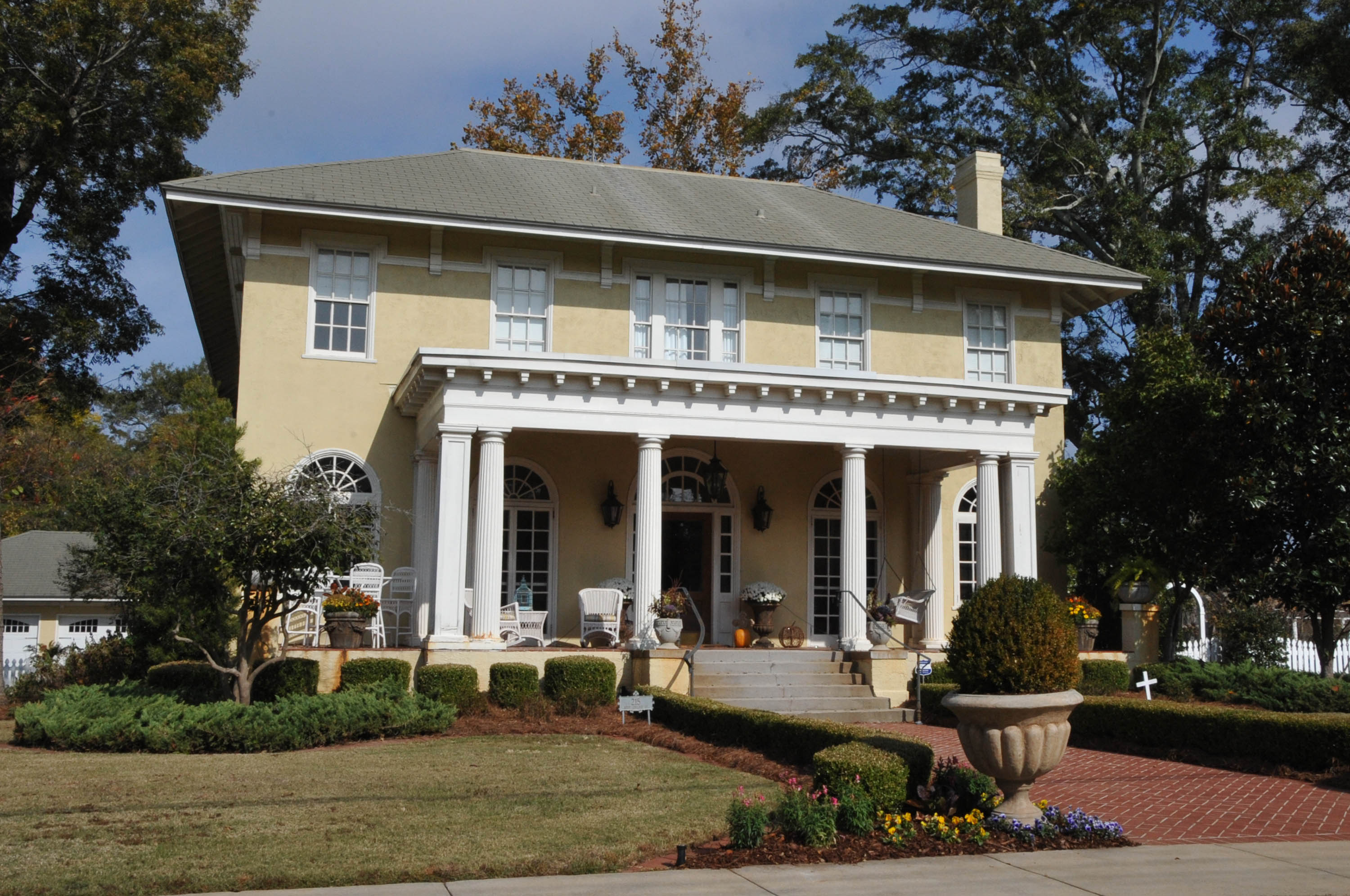
Henderson-Jones House, 1913-1915

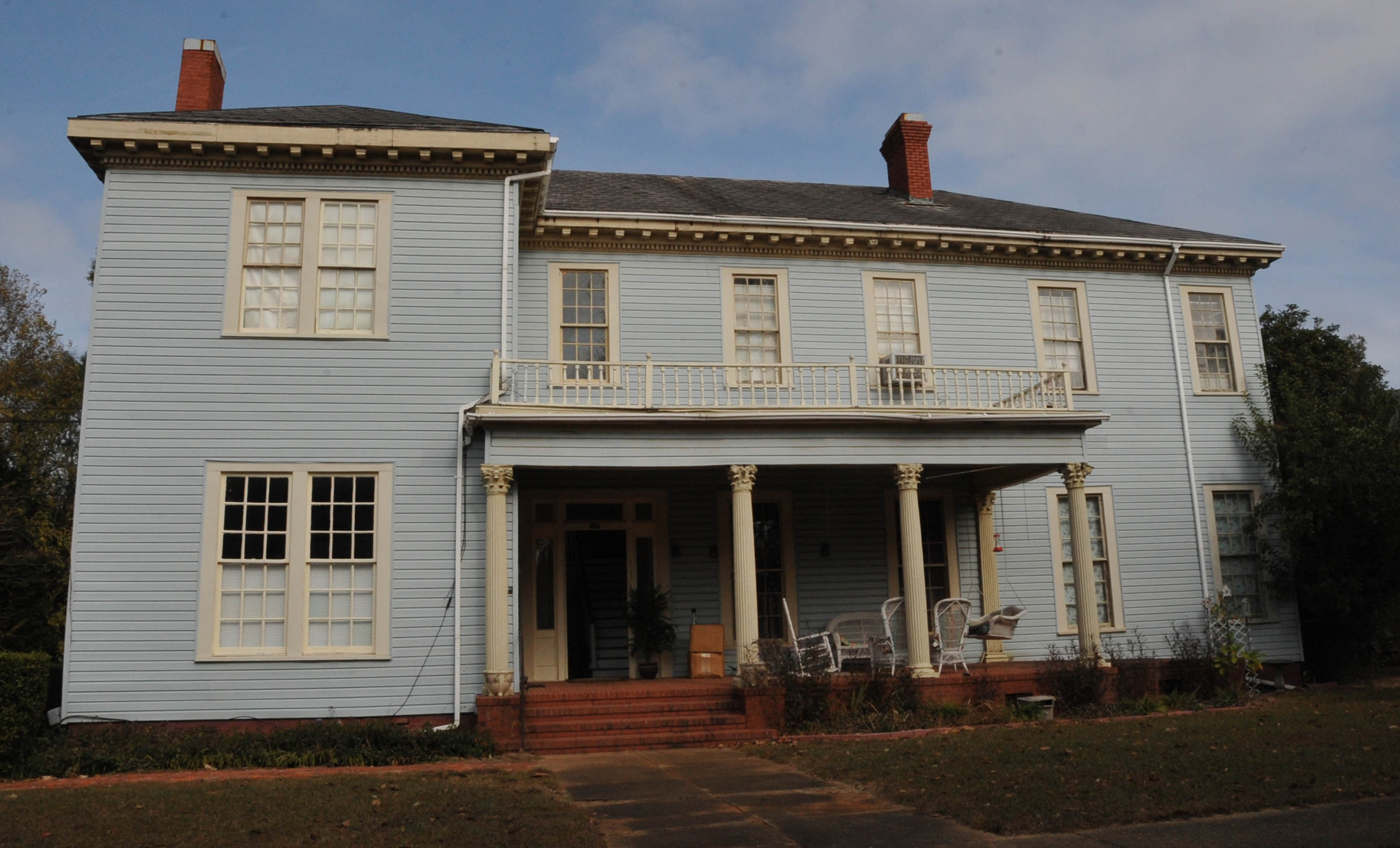
Knox-Chapman House, 1880s

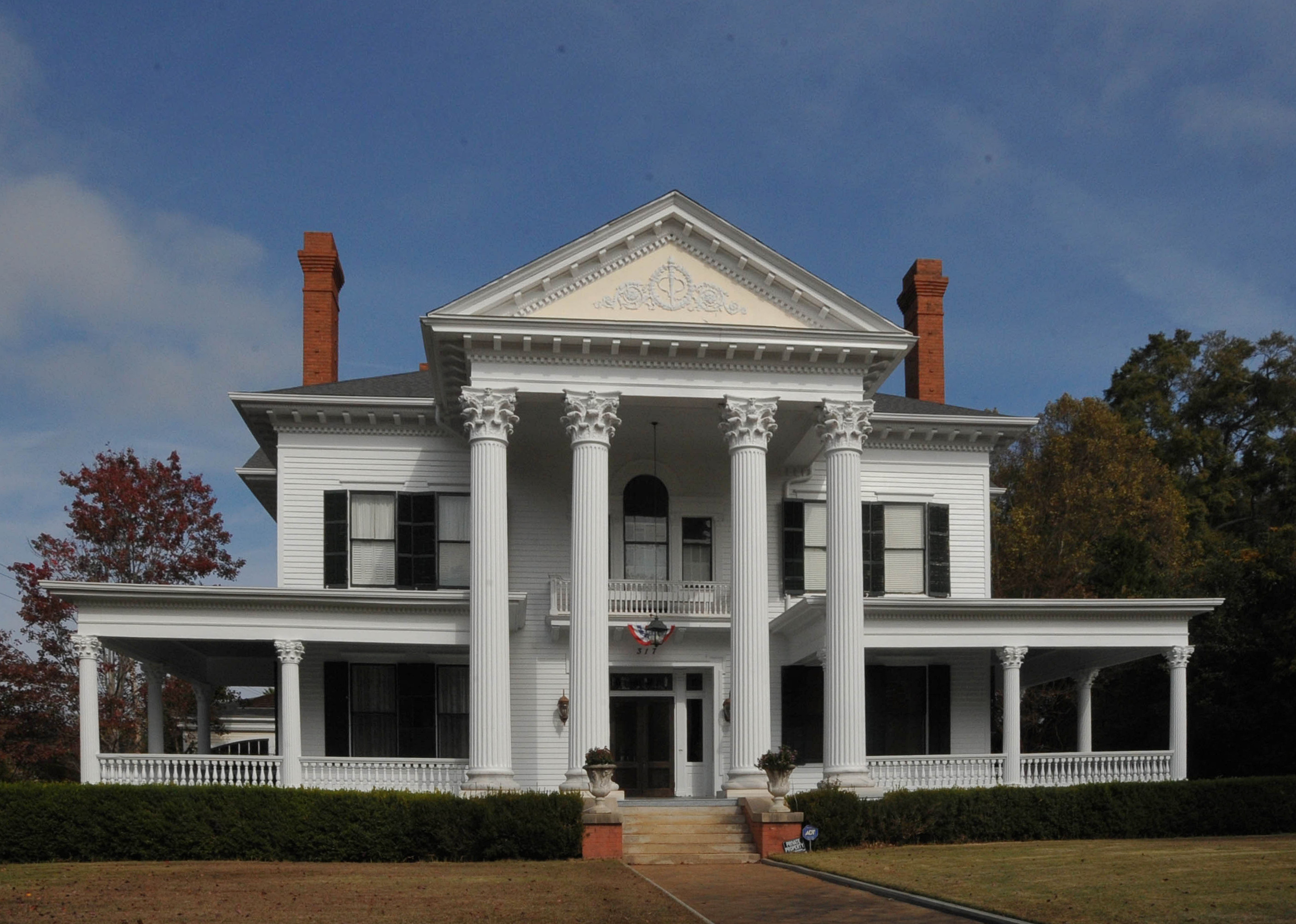
Bashinsky-Fowee House, 1902–03
