= Creek War of 1836 =

1836 US Indian War

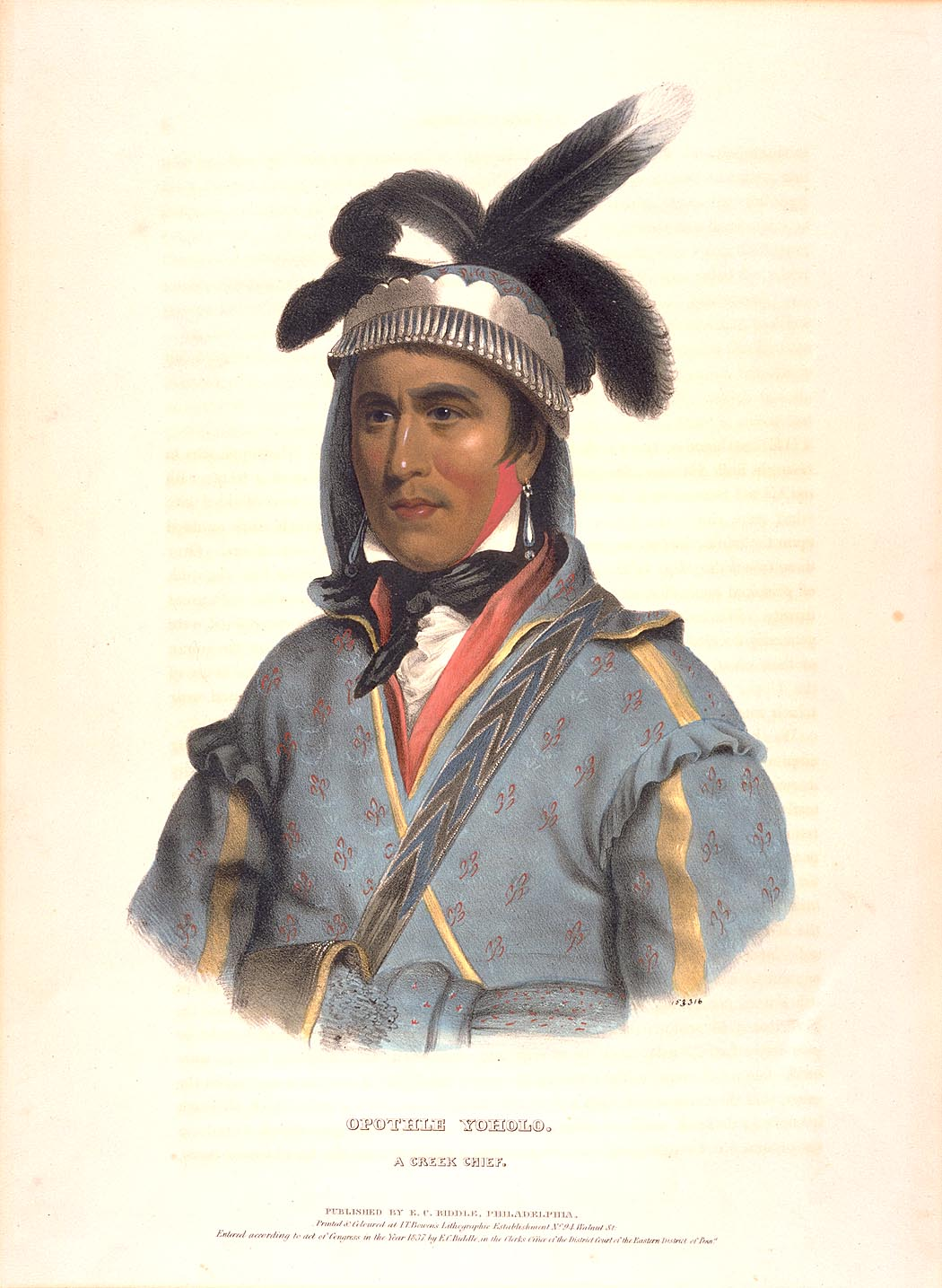
During the Creek War of 1836, in Alabama, Opothleyahola, a Creek chief was commissioned as a Colonel by the U.S. government, led 1,500 of his warriors against the rebellious Lower Creek tribe who had allied themselves with the Seminole in fighting against the U.S army invasion.

The Creek War of 1836, also known as the Second Creek War, was a conflict in Alabama at the time of Indian removal between the Muscogee Creek people and non-native land speculators and squatters.

Although the Creek people had been forced from Georgia under the Treaty of Washington of 1826, with many Lower Creeks moving to the Indian Territory, about 20,000 Upper Creeks were still living in Alabama.

The state acted to abolish tribal governments and extend state laws over the Creek. Chief Opothle Yohola appealed to the administration of President Andrew Jackson for protection from Alabama but he supported removal. The Creek signed the Treaty of Cusseta on 24 March 1832, which divided up Creek lands into individual allotments. Creeks could either sell their allotments and receive funds to remove to the west, or stay in Alabama as state and federal citizens, who would have to submit to state laws.

Land speculators and squatters began to defraud Creeks out of their allotments, resulting in some violent backlash from these Creeks. U.S. officials described the violence as a "war" in order to argue that the Creeks were thereby forfeiting their prior treaty rights. Secretary of War Lewis Cass dispatched General Winfield Scott to end the violence by forcibly removing the Creeks to the Indian Territory west of the Mississippi River.

== See also ==
- Battle of Pea River
