= Chilkoot Trail tramways =

Aerial trams

Coordinates: 59.6800°N 135.2626°W

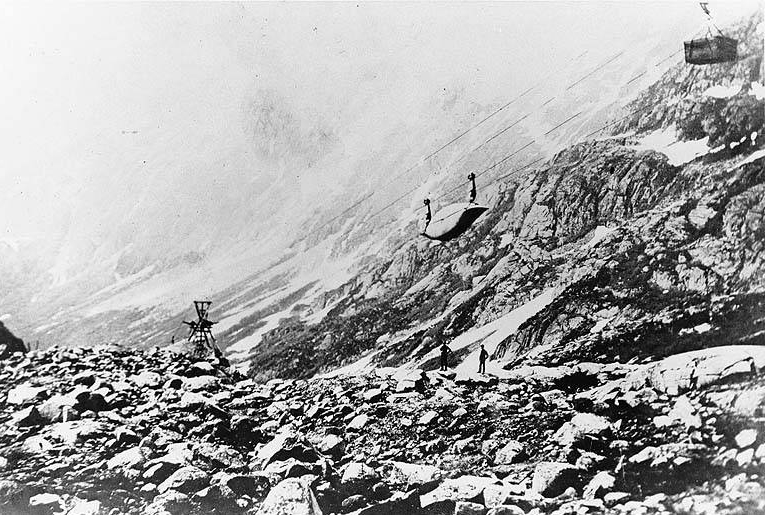
Chilkoot tramway, possibly the Dyea-Klondike Transportation Company, c.1898

The Chilkoot Trail tramways were aerial tramways that played a significant role in the Klondike Gold Rush and the Chilkoot Trail as a transportation system to move prospectors and equipment towards the Dawson City/Klondike gold fields in Canada.

Four tramways and one hoist operated on the trail, although all eventually closed before 1900 when the White Pass and Yukon Route railroad became the transportation method of choice for remaining prospectors.

== Peterson Hoist ==
The Peterson Hoist, set up in 1896, was one of the first of semi-permanent gear-hauling infrastructures to be built on the trail. Little is known about P.H. Peterson's hoist, including its location. He may have in fact operated on the adjacent, eponymous Peterson Pass instead of the Chilkoot Pass. Peterson's hoist simply consisted of, according to an observer, a pulley at the top of the pass with a rope running through it. Attached to one end of the rope was a sled with runners and the other a box. Gear would be loaded into the sled while the box would be filled with snow and gravity would work its magic with the snow-filled box pulling the sled up as it went down. Everything would be emptied and the operation repeated. The hoist's simplicity leads to part of the befuddlement over the location, as this hoist left a minimal number of artifacts.

On February 17, 1898 Peterson leased the hoist to J.F. Hielscher for the subsequent five months, which were the peak months of the rush.

== Archie Burns' Tramway ==
Archie Burns, in the spring of 1897, instituted the first tramway on the trail, running from the Scales to the false summit on the Chilkoot Pass. The tramway was horse-powered but also combined its services with manual hauling services from Dyea to The Scales.

In the winter of 1897-1898 the tram was purchased by Juneau merchant C.W. Young and the tram and associated hauling services became C.W. Young Freighting and Trading Company with Burns remaining as manager. As early as December 1897 or as late as February 1898 (the precise date is unknown), the newly coined C.W. Young Tramway upgraded from horse power to steam power. With the less-developed Peterson Hoist as its only competition, the C.W. Tramway was heavily used and profits rolled in. By late February 1898, the tram was hauling over five tons of freight daily with its rates changing upon demand. Later, for unknown reasons, Burns decided to supplement the steam-powered tram with a gasoline powered hoist operating in a similar manner to the Peterson Hoist except using gasoline power instead of a gravity counterweight. In January 1899 Burns purchased the tram and hauling infrastructure back from C.W. Young for $5,000 as the number of prospectors taking the Chilkoot dwindled. Either the end of that winter or the beginning of that spring, Burns closed his tram for the last time leaving Southeast Alaska for Nome, Alaska. He came back in 1900, however, only to reclaim the valuable portions of machinery although many artifacts from his operation remain as artifacts on the trail today.

== Dyea-Klondike Transportation Company (DKT) ==
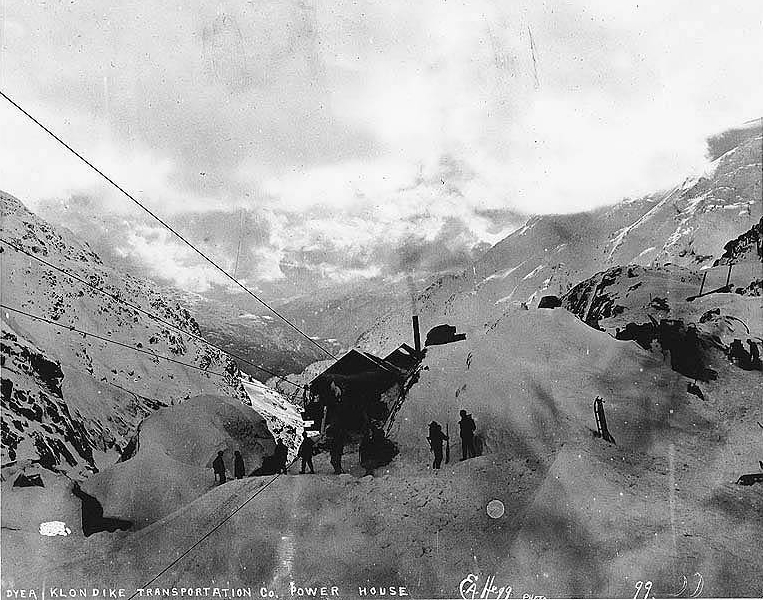
Aerial tramway powerhouse, Dyea-Klondike Transportation Company, ca. 1898

The Dyea-Klondike Transportation Company (DKT) came into the Chilkoot Trail scene in the fall of 1897 with ambitious plans. It originally set out to build a "narrow gauge tramroad like those used in mines" from their wharf in Dyea up to The Scales. From there an aerial tramway would haul gear up and over the pass creating a comprehensive freight transportation system from the waters of Lynn Canal all the way into Canada. However, like many ideas tossed around during gold rush days, this one fell through after the company, which was located in Portland, Oregon, ran into financial difficulties. The operation was subsequently scaled back and replaced the planned tramroad with horses, although plans for an aerial tram at the pass remained.

On March 17, 1898, the DKT opened its 2,400-foot (730 m) aerial tramway proudly announcing it to be "the only tramway in the world powered by electricity." This turned out to be true, with the electricity originating from the company's Canyon City power plant which was originally created to power the tramroad. Ruins of a steam boiler exist at the location. Seven miles of power lines from Canyon City up to The Scales carried the electricity to the tramroad. The tramway ruined Archie Burns'/C.W. Young's monopoly on tramways on the pass and, for just under a month, it was the only aerial tramway over the pass.

The tramway's history as an independent company turned out to be relatively short. In June 1898, four months after the tramway opened, the Dyea-Klondike Transportation Company merged with both the Alaska Railroad and Transportation Company and Chilkoot Railroad and Transport Company (the other two substantial tram companies in operation) for a more cooperative and coordinated operation. In June 1899, one year after the merger, the conglomerate tram company was purchased by the White Pass and Yukon Route railroad to prevent competition and began to be scrapped in the fall of 1899.

== Alaska Railroad and Transportation Company (AR&T) ==
The Alaska Railroad and Transportation Company (AR&T) was the second most-developed tramway system on the Chilkoot Trail and the second of three aerial tramways to be constructed.

The AR&T, under the jurisdiction of the Pacific Coast Steamship Company, showed interest in the Chilkoot Trail area around December 1897 by purchasing tidewater property for a wharf in Dyea and building freight depots at both Dyea and near Sheep Camp. The company's intentions, as its name reveals, was to build a railroad up to The Scales and construct an aerial tram from there over the pass. While it is not known how the concept of a railroad was dropped soon after the company's creation, the railroad portion of construction was no longer pursued.

Construction began and sometime around May 1898, the gas-powered, 6,000-foot (1,800 m) long aerial tramway was completed. Unlike the three other tram companies, AR&T's operation consisted only of the tramway, with no horse-hauling services or other subcontracted services. The tramway, however, was far superior to the Dyea-Klondike Company's tram in terms of weight able to be carried, length, and strength but its spell as the dominant freight agent in the Taiya River valley was short-lived as well. Soon the Chilkoot Railroad and Transport Company finished construction on their longer, more durable, and more comprehensive system and by June of the same year all three tram companies merged and began charging uniform rates.

It is believed that the tram operated until June 1899 when it was purchased by the White Pass and Yukon Route railroad which was aiming to clear competition for its services. By March 1900, workers had cleared everything of value from the tram line leaving only empty wooden structures.

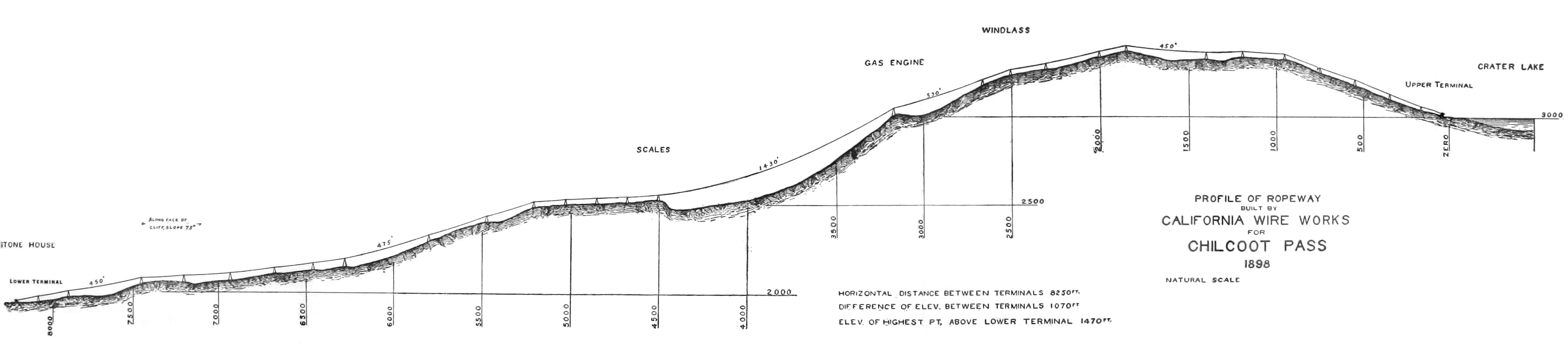
Horizontal elevation plan for an aerial tramway 8,250 feet (2,510 m) long at the Chilkoot Pass from Stone House to Crater Lake. Each line mark represents 500 feet (150 m)

== Chilkoot Railroad and Transport Company (CR&T) ==
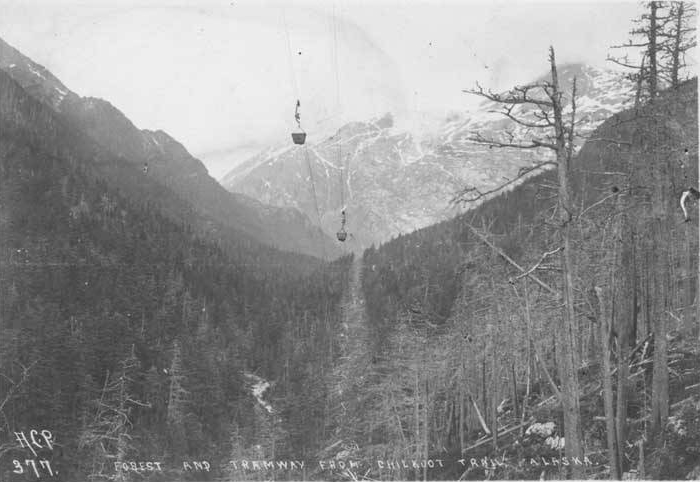
Chilkoot Trail tramway in forest, 1898

The Chilkoot Railroad and Transport Company (CR&T) was the largest, most comprehensive, and last of the Chilkoot Trail tramways to be constructed.

At first, planners toyed with a horse-drawn tramroad and even a railroad going straight up the Taiya River valley, but financial restraints tempered these plans. The company settled on a wagon road to Canyon City, a two-stage aerial tram system (Canyon City to Sheep Camp and Sheep Camp to Stone Crib), and contracted packing services from Stone Crib to Lake Lindeman. This system enabled the company to be the first to offer an integrated transportation option that would transfer prospectors' gear from the wharfs of Dyea to the headwaters of the Yukon River (i.e., Lake Lindeman and Lindeman City).

Construction began in December 1897 and both trams began running by May 1898. While CR&T merged with the Alaska Railroad Transportation Company and the Dyea-Klondike Transportation Company just a month after CR&T opened its trams, its infrastructure was heavily used well into June 1899 when the White Pass and Yukon Route railroad construction reached Lake Bennett in British Columbia effectively rendering CR&T obsolete. Even then, however, CR&T's freight rates were comparable to those of the railroad and so in 1899 White Pass and Yukon Route purchased the Chilkoot Railroad and Transportation Company's trams and began dismantling them beginning in January 1900 and finishing by April of the same year.
