= Chilkoot Pass =

Mountain pass in British Columbia and Alaska

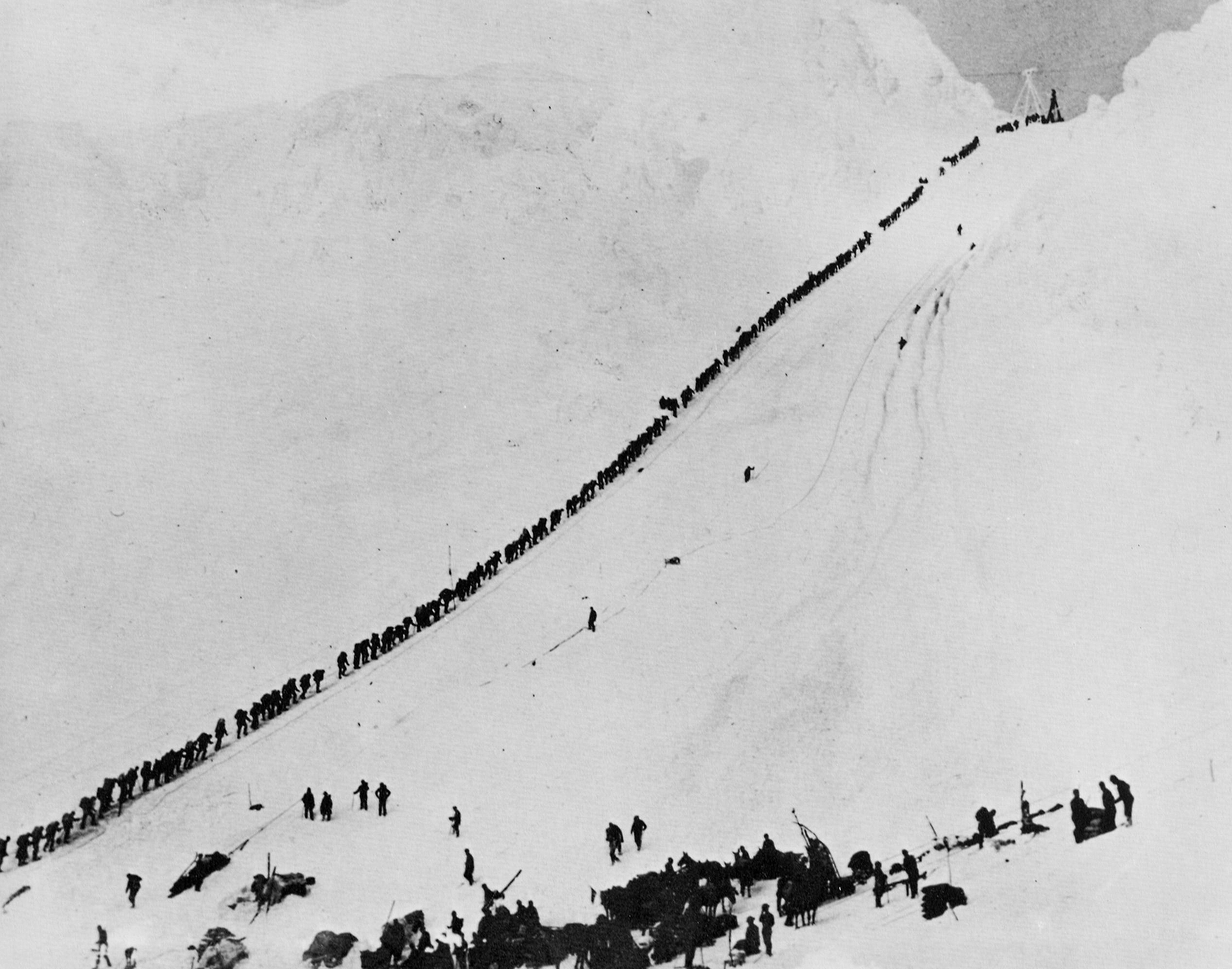
- Miners and packers climbing the Chilkoot Pass, September 1898, during the Klondike Gold Rush

- Location within Alaska Location within British Columbia
- Elevation: 3,759 ft (1,146 m)
- Traversed by: Chilkoot Trail

Third Approach
- Location: United States: Municipality of Skagway Borough, Alaska; Canada: Atlin District, British Columbia
- Range: Boundary Ranges
- Coordinates: 59°41′49″N 135°14′19″W
- Topo map: NTS 104M11 White Pass

Chilkoot Pass (el. 3,759 feet or 1,146 metres) is a high mountain pass through the Boundary Ranges of the Coast Mountains in the U.S. state of Alaska and British Columbia, Canada. It is the highest point along the Chilkoot Trail, which leads from Dyea, Alaska, to Bennett Lake, British Columbia. The Chilkoot Trail was long a route used by the Tlingit for trade.

During the Klondike Gold Rush of the late 19th century, it was used by prospectors and packers to get through the mountains. During the gold rush, three aerial tramways and several surface hoists were constructed and operated briefly over the pass. When the White Pass and Yukon Route railroad was built in neighboring White Pass, the Chilkoot Pass route fell out of favor with miners.

The Pass and the Trail are administered by the national park services of the U.S. and Canada. On the B.C. side, it is administered as Chilkoot Trail National Historic Site. On the Alaska side, it is one unit of the Klondike Gold Rush National Historical Park. In the summer of 1998, the Site and the Park united to form Klondike Gold Rush International Historical Park. Modern-day visitors can hike the 33-mile (53 km) trail after registering and paying a fee.

== Background ==
The Klondike Gold Rush began on August 16, 1896, on Bonanza Creek, near Dawson, about 50 miles (80 kilometers) east of the Alaskan border. The Chilkoot Trail is reported to have spanned between 28 and 33 miles (45 and 53 km) from sea level at Dyea, Alaska, to Lake Bennett, British Columbia, elevation 2602 ft. (642 m). The Chilkoot Pass was an important milestone that travellers had to conquer in order to reach the Klondike. The travellers were called 'stampeders', and some had earlier sought the riches of the 1889 gold rush in Alaska.

To be allowed to enter the Klondike and take part in the gold rush, Canadian officials required that stampeders take one ton of provisions with them, to try to ensure they were prepared to survive on the frontier. This was broken down into a year's supply of food, which was half of the weight, and 1,000 pounds (450 kg) of equipment. The supplies and food requirements were broken down into two lists. The clothing items included a waterproof blanket, 6 pairs of wool socks, 2 flannel overshirts, and a medicine chest. The list continues with the essential clothing needed. Some of the supplies required included rolled oats, flour, salt, and bacon. The weight ranged from 20 to 400 pounds (10–180 kg) for one ingredient. This list was taken very seriously, as there was rarely a return journey after the Klondike was reached.

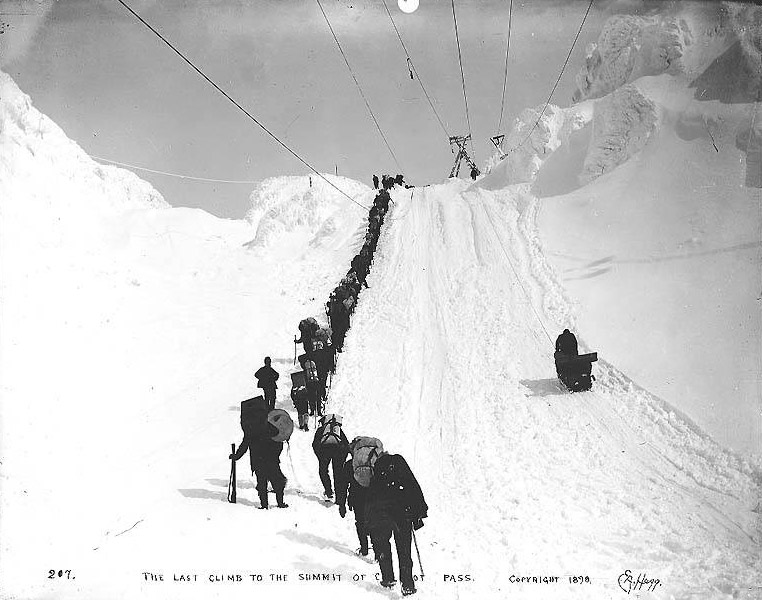
Last trek over the summit, 1898

Park officials still require travellers to make preparation for hiking in this area. But the list for travelling the Trail and Pass is now very different, as the technologies allow for a much smaller supply list. In addition, more creature comforts are available, such as lightweight camp stoves.

No traveller could take his supplies across the pass at once, so several trips had to be made in order to transport all needed goods to the destination. Quite often the supplies had to be carried by hand in 50–60-pound packs, as the passes proved to be too narrow for wagons or draft animals. The travel was slow and what would have taken a few hours in another environment required days to complete. It is estimated that for every mile their supplies moved, the travelers had to walk 80 miles to get it there.

Only the wealthiest of stampeders could afford to hire labour to transport their supplies. Most stampeders had to carry their own. The professional packers of the time mainly consisted of Alaska Natives and First Nations people (Indians), who charged 1 cent per pound they carried. Working the market, the packers quickly moved to new customers if there was a hint of more money to be offered by someone else. The packing fees charged by professional packers were subject to change as the weather changed. Ground conditions could make the packing much more difficult, and muddier ground was harder to traverse than frozen, snow-covered ground.

== The Pass ==
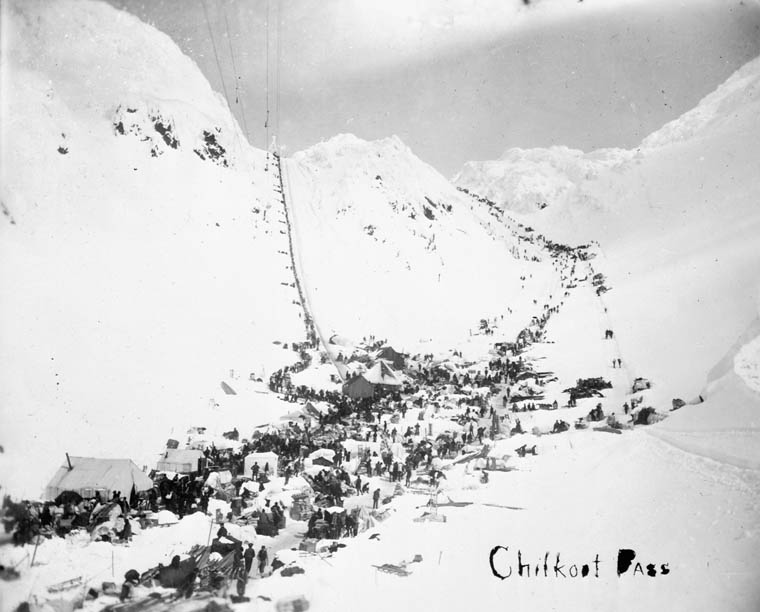
The Golden Stairs (left), Peterson Pass (right), the Scales (bottom)

The Chilkoot trail rose 900 feet (270 m) to the base of the Chilkoot Pass at an area called the Scales. This was a rough rock-strewn area, so named because it was the last place where travelers could have their packs reweighed and adjustments could be made to their payments. The Scales was also used as a place where travelers could store their provisions and supplies while going to lower levels to get the remainder, before continuing on their journey up the Pass. After the Scales, the ground rose about 500 to 600 feet (150–180 m) over a distance of approximately 1/2 mile (800 m). The trail was covered with giant, sharp slabs of rock, which made the footing treacherous and often induced crawling during the summer months.

In the winter, workers cut the ice into 1500 steps, which came to be known as the 'Golden Stairs'. The steps were too narrow for more than one person to climb at a time, so the trek was limited to a single-file line up the mountain, as shown in the photo for this article. The workers who had carved steps into the ice of Chilkoot Pass also charged travelers to ascend the mountain, as the travelers had to use their stairs.

=== Tramways ===
Ropes were lowered along the trail to help the travelers balance and continue up the slippery slopes. After 1897 a tramway was built so that wealthy travelers could ease their last 600 feet (180 m) up the Pass. The tramway was powered by two horses, and it cost 1 1/2 cents per pound (3.3 ¢/kg) to hire. Historians have estimated the builder of the tramway was making $150 per day by his development. On the other side of the Pass was Emerald Lake. To travel down the mountain, the travelers faced a descent of 1,300 feet (400 m) over the horizontal distance of approximately 9 miles (14 km). The crest through the mountain and the path down it were often filled with snow all year round, making the trek more difficult.

=== Environment ===
There was a high risk of avalanche along the Chilkoot Pass, as snow storms were frequent and the snow could give way and speed down the summit. The wet and heavy snow of the avalanches could kill 50 to 100 men at a time. Travelers persisted in using the high-risk pass the most because it was the least expensive route, as well as the shortest route, for transporting their supplies.

The weather through the Pass was unpredictable, and visibility could drop to a few feet. Travelers became soaked from rain and sweat from their physical exertion; the sun's reflection against the snow could burn their skin and almost blind them. The price of provisions took a discernible downturn, as many men who had packed their year's worth of provisions to White Pass (an alternative route) had decided to turn back and sold their provisions to anyone who chose to ascend the Passes. The price of horses had increased to approximately $200 an animal at the trip's beginning.

== North-West Mounted Police ==
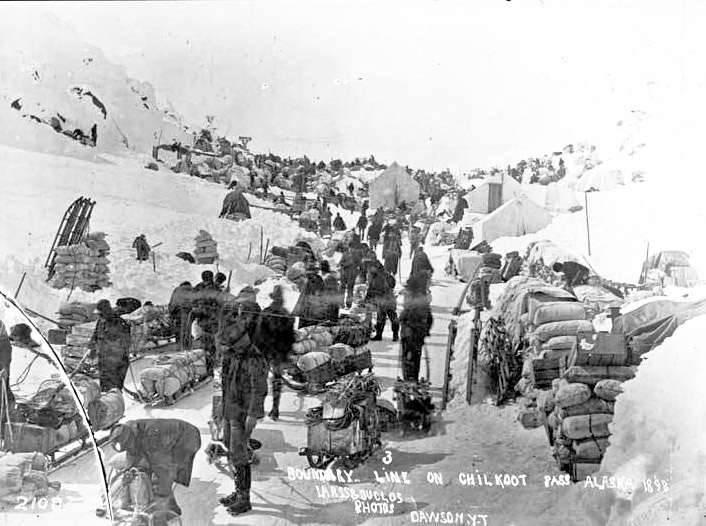
Border crossing at the top of the Chilkoot Pass

At both the Chilkoot Pass and the White Pass, members of the North-West Mounted Police (NWMP) were assigned to collect custom duties on the supplies brought into Canada. These officers were also used to protect supplies. As noted above, when stampeders traveled by the Chilkoot Pass, they had to leave some of their provisions at each end of the pass during the journey, as they could not manage transporting them all at once. To protect the supplies, a large detachment of the North-West Mounted Police was stationed to ensure that the proper wares went to the proper traveler. The police also ensured that the rule of 1 ton of goods per person was enforced.

Tensions arose between the NWMP and the Americans related to disputes about where the international borders were located. After several disputes between the governments, they decided to keep the international boundary at the Chilkoot and the White Passes. The NWMP had already built custom houses at both passes prior to the dispute being settled. Canada also used its militia, called the Yukon Field Force, to help the NWMP with guarding prisoners and protecting gold shipments. The NWMP also regulated the whisky trade along the trails.

The police had wanted to build a port of entry at the summits of both the Chilkoot Pass and the White Pass. This was to secure the border between Canada and the United States at these points. The endeavor would cost a small fortune, as the wood had to be taken up the tramway, and they had to bribe any offended packers. They wanted to avoid any delay in getting a cabin on the Chilkoot Pass summit. But the cabin was not constructed well and the high winds of the Chilkoot Pass drove snow into it. As the snow melted, the interior became wet, creating mould; living conditions were so poor that blankets and bedding would not dry. The collection of custom duties on the summit of Chilkoot Pass began on February 26, 1898. The role was transferred to customs officers when an office opened that June but closed in September 1900 after the building of the White Pass and Yukon Route.

== Women on the Trails ==
With rumors of some successes, both men and women viewed the Gold Rush as a chance to make a fortune and break out of poverty. Based on steamship passenger lists, historians estimate that approximately 1500 women made the trek through the Chilkoot and White trails. This represented 7 percent of all the travelers between December 1898 and September 1900. At the beginning of the gold rush stampede, only a few hundred non-native women participated. Some of these women were wives of the stampeders, while others had traveled in order to gain employment as clerks, teachers, cooks, nurses, or prostitutes. Camp Lindeman was reported to have a woman doctor.

Women's clothing of the time made their journeys through the trails and across the passes even more difficult. The long, full skirts were ill-suited for any physical labour, and were often made with five yards (or more) of material, making them very heavy and cumbersome. Having to wear corsets and petticoats further limited women's mobility. The high collars required women to hold their heads high and, depending on the outfit, tilt their heads back. During this period, a women's movement had formed to allow women more freedom in the way they dressed. The rigors of the trail meant that many women abandoned conventional clothing and began to wear bloomers or knickers. These long, full pants were gathered at the ankle or just below the knees. Women shortened their skirts over the bloomers, generally to knee length. This was considered controversial by many men, but was more acceptable than if the women had not worn skirts. Some of the women who traveled to the Klondike had left their children behind, as few were willing to subject their children to the dangers of the trails and passes.

== Alternative route ==
The trail from Skagway, Alaska, to White Pass and Lake Lindeman was an alternative, but the trail was subject to outlaws. Soapy Smith and his gang, centered in the port makeshift town of Skagway below the Pass, were conniving and murderous thieves—if they couldn't cheat someone out of their belongings or money, they would steal valuables, and killing those that got in their way was common. The White Pass became more narrow and difficult to travel than as first presented to stampeders. Dynamite from a site above the trail caused a massive block to fall on the Dunns [whose first names may have been Elizabeth and Michael], a married pair traveling with their horses. The block buried them and their horses; it remains there to this day on the trail, adorned with a black Christian cross, and is now known as Black Cross Rock. This pass became too narrow for wagons, but men still tried to use horses along the trail. Many had little or no experience working with animals and drove the horses to death. The men would either shoot the horses or, if the horse fell and could not get up, they would just pull its horseshoes and go off, leaving the animal to die in the mud and snow. This was a common occurrence on White Pass along a stretch that was dubbed Dead Horse Trail. The men traveled back down to the beach again and purchased more horses to replace the ones that died on this trail.

Most of the horses that died on the White Pass trail gave out or were killed within a 2-mile (3-kilometer) stretch of slope. By 1897, 3200 pack horses had died on White Pass trail, and their bodies were left there, often used as footing for other pack horses making their way through the trail. The horses that had fallen were not always dead, and suffered more under the hooves of others.

When the horses could not work anymore, or were of no further use along the Chilkoot Trail, the animals were turned loose without feed. Many animals were left at the base of Chilkoot Pass at Sheep Camp. Most of the animals became sick and starved as they staggered through the camps trying to find food. The horses were no longer useful and had lost their value.

Malnutrition was also a large problem for the human travelers on the Chilkoot and White Pass Trails, and many died from it. Sometimes people suffering from malnutrition ate the bodies of the dead horses left on the White Pass Trail, and became violently ill as a result. It was rumoured that a traveler had used his boots as a source of food by boiling them and drinking the broth after so he could eat something. Physical illness was not the only problem to plague the travelers, as many also went insane from the conditions along the trails. Historians have suggested that the high rate of mental problems recounted were caused by the poor diets of many travelers, added to what may have been poor condition before starting the trails. In addition, along the trail the only shelter against the sometimes -40 degree temperatures were thin tents.

== In culture ==
"Take the oath again, Daylight," the same voice cried. "I sure will. I first come over Chilkoot in '83. I went out over the Pass in a fall blizzard, with a rag of a shirt and a cup of raw flour. I got my grub-stake in Juneau that winter, and in the spring I went over the Pass once more. And once more the famine drew me out. Next spring I went in again, and I swore then that I'd never come out till I made my stake. Well, I ain't made it, and here I am. And I ain't going out now. I get the mail and I come right back. I won't stop the night at Dyea. I'll hit up Chilkoot soon as I change the dogs and get the mail and grub. And so I swear once more, by the mill-tails of hell and the head of John the Baptist, I'll never hit for the Outside till I make my pile. And I tell you-all, here and now, it's got to be an almighty big pile."

— Jack London, Burning Daylight (1910)

The pass is depicted in the 1925 Charlie Chaplin movie The Gold Rush, the 1929 silent The Trail of '98, and the 1991 film White Fang.

The name of the pass is also used instead of “Yosemite” for Yosemite Sam’s character in the 1952 Warner Bros. Looney Tunes animated cartoon 14 Carrot Rabbit.

== See also ==
- Klondike Gold Rush National Historic Park (US)
