= Chilkoot Trail =

Long-distance hiking trail in Canada and the United States

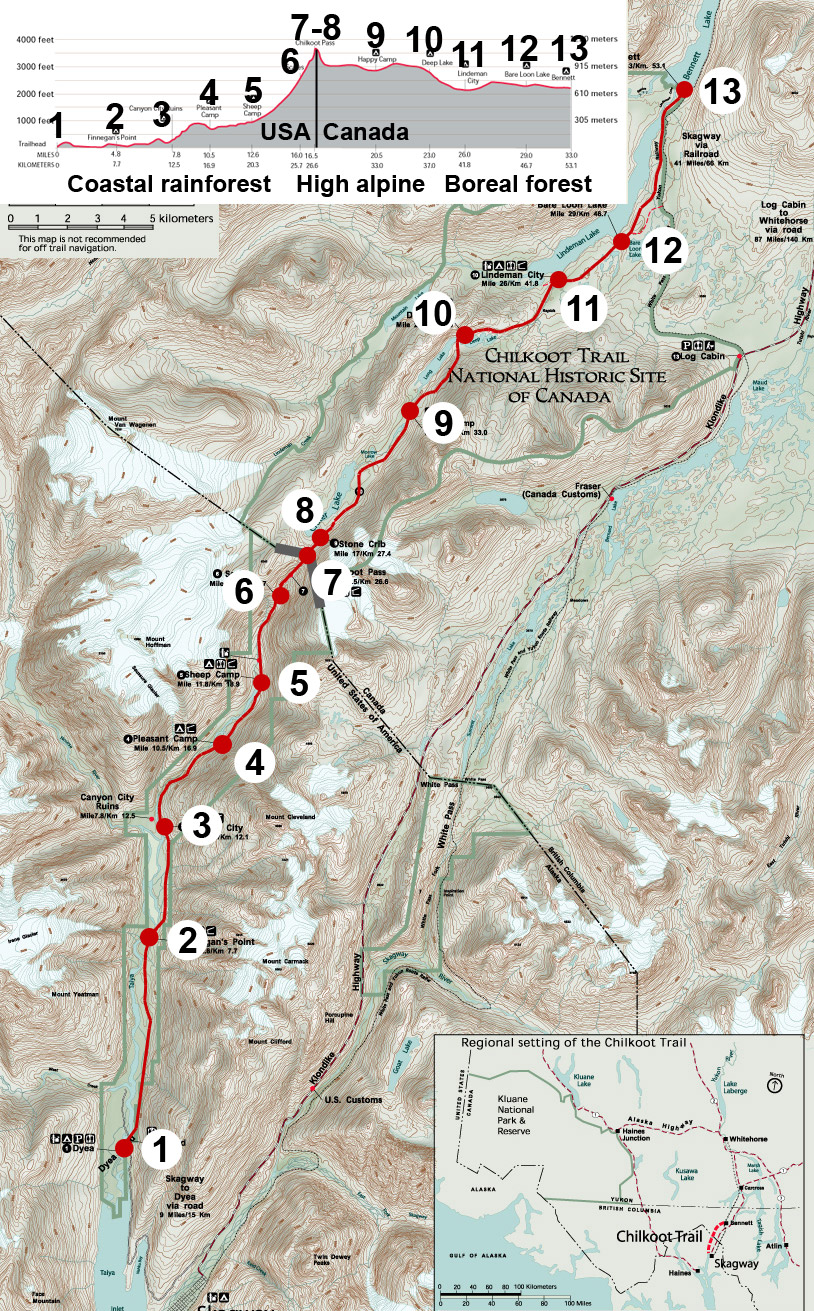
- 1. Dyea, 2. Finnegan's Point, 3. Canyon City, 4. Pleasant Camp, 5. Sheep Camp, 6. Scales, 7. Chilkoot Pass, 8. Stone Crib, 9. Happy Camp, 10. Deep Lake, 11. Lake Lindemann, 12. Bare Loon Lake, 13. Lake Bennett
- Length: 33 miles
- Summit: Chilkoot Pass; 1067 m / 3,525 feet
- Legacy: Trail for Klondike Gold Rush (1896–1899)
- Location: Southeast Alaska - Northwest British Columbia

National Historic Site of Canada
- Official name: Chilkoot Trail National Historic Site of Canada
- Designated: 1987

U.S. National Historic Landmark
- Official name: Chilkoot Trail and Dyea Site
- Designated: 1978

- Chilkoot Trail and Dyea Site
- U.S. National Register of Historic Places
- U.S. National Historic Landmark District
- U.S. Historic district – Contributing property
- Alaska Heritage Resources Survey
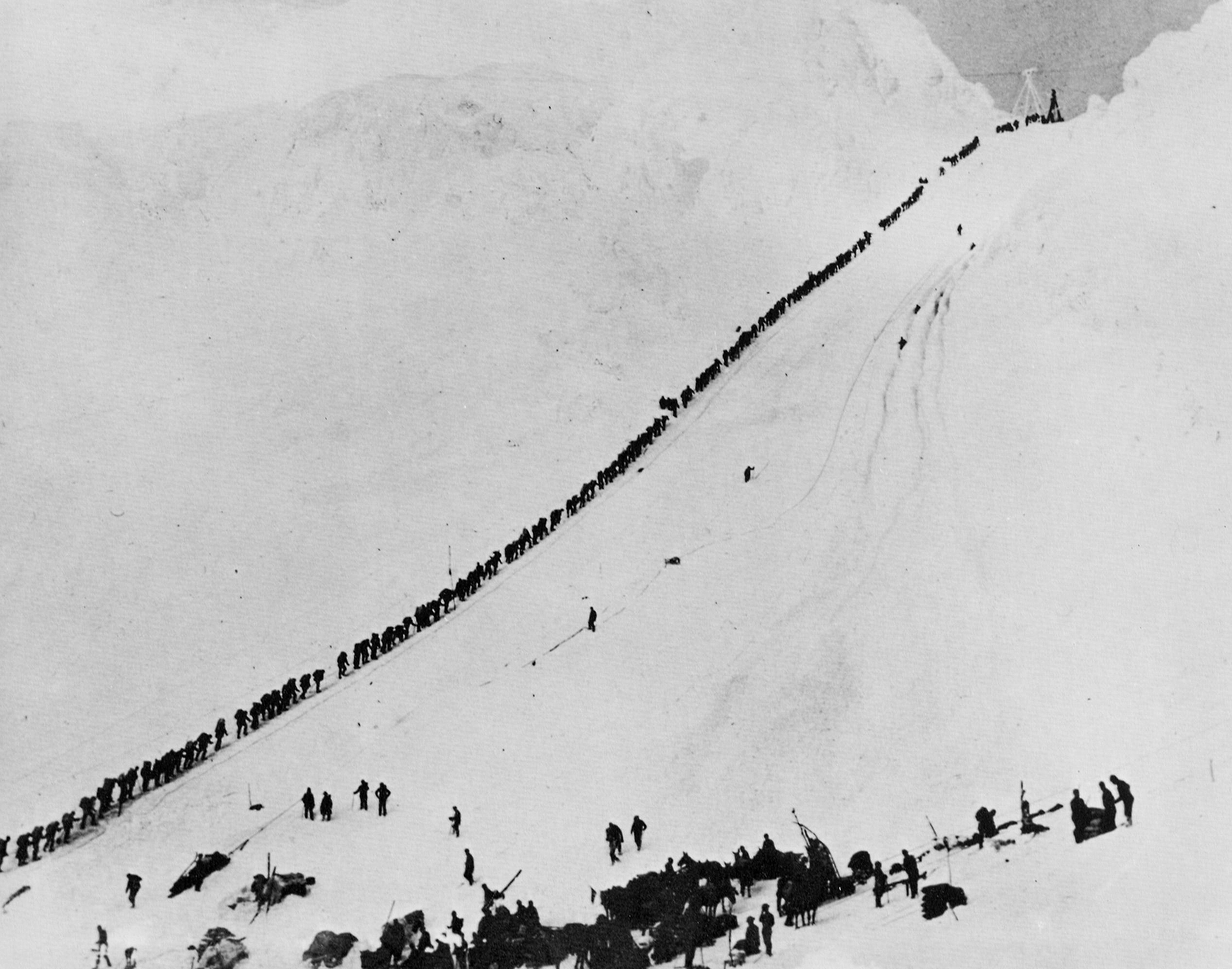
- Miners climbing Chilkoot

- Location within Alaska
- Nearest city: Skagway, Alaska
- Coordinates: 59°35′14″N 135°19′56″W
- Area: 11,882 acres (4,808 ha)
- Built: 1897
- Part of: Klondike Gold Rush National Historical Park (ID76002189)
- NRHP reference No.: 75002120
- AHRS No.: SKG-006; SKG-067

Significant dates
- Added to NRHP: April 14, 1975
- Designated NHLD: June 16, 1978
- Designated CP: June 30, 1976
- Designated AHRS: June 30, 1974; December 14, 1974

The Chilkoot Trail is a 33-mile (53 km) trail through the Coast Mountains that leads from Dyea, Alaska, in the United States to Bennett, British Columbia, in Canada. It was a major access route from the coast to Yukon goldfields in the late 1890s. The trail became obsolete in 1899 when a railway was built from Dyea's neighbor port Skagway along the parallel White Pass trail.

The U.S. portion of the Chilkoot Trail and Dyea Site were designated a National Historic Landmark in 1978, following creation of Klondike Gold Rush National Historical Park in 1976. In 1987, the B.C. portion of the trail was designated Chilkoot Trail National Historic Site. In 1998, the centennial of the gold rush, the National Historic Site in British Columbia joined with the U.S. National Historical Park to form Klondike Gold Rush International Historical Park. In 2022, the 16.5 mi (26.6 km) portion of the trail in Alaska was designated Chilkoot National Historic Trail, part of the National Trails System.

== History ==
=== Indigenous use ===
Tlingit Indigenous people used the trail as a vital trade route to trade for resources available in the interior. As pressures from American settlers and the Hudson's Bay Company weakened the traditional Tlingit trading system, the Chilkoot Trail slowly became utilized by explorers and prospectors.

The name Chilkoot Trail is a partial translation of the trail's Tlingit name, namely Chilkoot Dei•yi, which means Chilkoot-owned Trail. The trail's English name omits the reference to ownership. In addition, the second word of Chilkoot Dei•yi sounds like the name for the village of Dyea. Prior publications state that Dyea was derived from "to pack" [yaa] or "carrying place" [yaa yé]. However, the presence of the initial \d\ sound in Dyea casts doubt on those latter possibilities, and suggests that the first syllable had been dei (as in dei-yi).

=== Klondike era ===
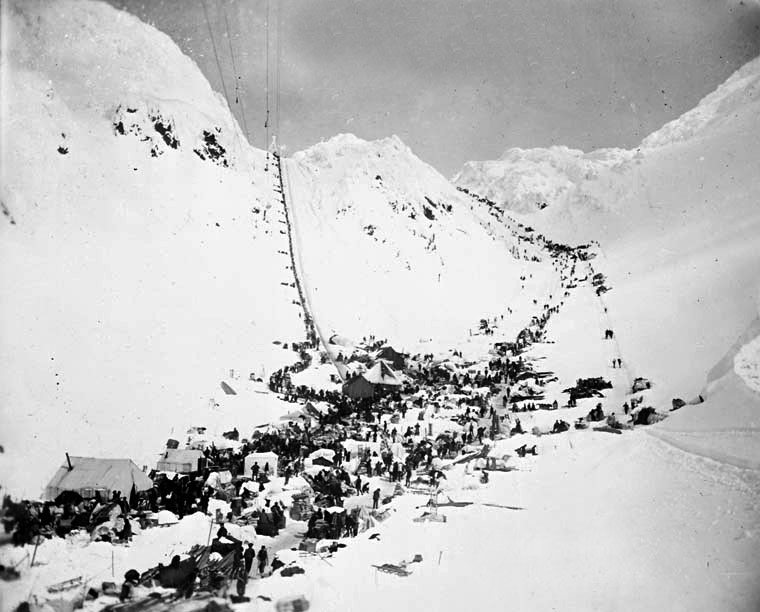
Chilkoot Pass during gold rush, March–April 1898

The Klondike Gold Rush (1896–1899) transformed the Chilkoot Trail into a mainstream transportation route to Canada's interior. The gold rush was primarily focused in the region around Dawson City in Yukon and the Yukon River. Of the several overland routes, the Chilkoot Trail was the most direct, least expensive, and, soon enough, most popular.

The other primary route to the headwaters of the Yukon River, however, was also based out of Skagway: the rival White Pass route. The White Pass route was slightly longer but less rigorous and steep, whereas the Chilkoot was shorter and more difficult. Skagway, because of its deepwater harbor, served as the principal port for both routes (nearby Dyea, the beginning of the Chilkoot Trail, was built on the extensive, shallow Taiya River delta).

Prospectors who chose the Chilkoot were ferried to Dyea by small boat or ferry. Soon, both Skagway and Dyea were bustling tent cities as sensationalist headlines of the gold rush spurred men from across the United States to leave their jobs and families and gain passage up the Inside Passage to Skagway.

As it became apparent that many of the prospectors who chose the Chilkoot simply were not going to survive the arduous terrain and harsh weather, Canada's North-West Mounted Police (now the Royal Canadian Mounted Police) declared that prospectors could only enter Canada if they had at least one ton of gear, enough to supply a prospector for one year (the Klondike supply list).

Prospectors ferried the gear from campsites along the trail, slowly moving closer to the headwaters of the Yukon. With all the equipment and supplies being transported, alternative methods, especially those with a little supplemental income, sprouted up. Many prospectors purchased pack animals (although that method was more commonly used on the rival White Pass), and many others paid Tlingit Indians to haul gear on a per-pound rate from campsite to campsite.

==== Tramways ====
Aerial tramway companies soon were hauling tons of gear over the head of the prospectors every day. By the end of the Chilkoot Trail's heyday, there were five distinct tramway operations on different parts of the trail competing for the influx of gear and money in the region. Many of the trams constituted world-class engineering feats of the era.

=== Post-Klondike ===
After the Klondike Gold Rush, the trail became more or less deserted. Prospectors late to the gold rush now made their way to the Yukon on the new White Pass and Yukon Route narrow-gauge railroad, which took them all the way to Whitehorse, Yukon in the Yukon Territory. In 1969, the U.S. and Canadian governments jointly declared their intention to make Chilkoot Trail a component of a Klondike Gold Rush International Historic Park. The U.S. portion was eventually established in 1976 as Klondike Gold Rush National Historical Park, comprising part of Pioneer Square in downtown Seattle, Washington, various sites throughout Skagway, Alaska, the abandoned town site of Dyea, Alaska, and the U.S. portion of the Chilkoot Trail.

The Canadian portion of the trail was christened Chilkoot Trail National Historic Site, one of several sites that comprise the Canadian national park associated with the Klondike. Klondike Gold Rush NHP and Chilkoot Trail NHS together form Klondike Gold Rush International Historical Park, a designation introduced at the time of the centennial of the gold rush in 1998.

== Current status ==
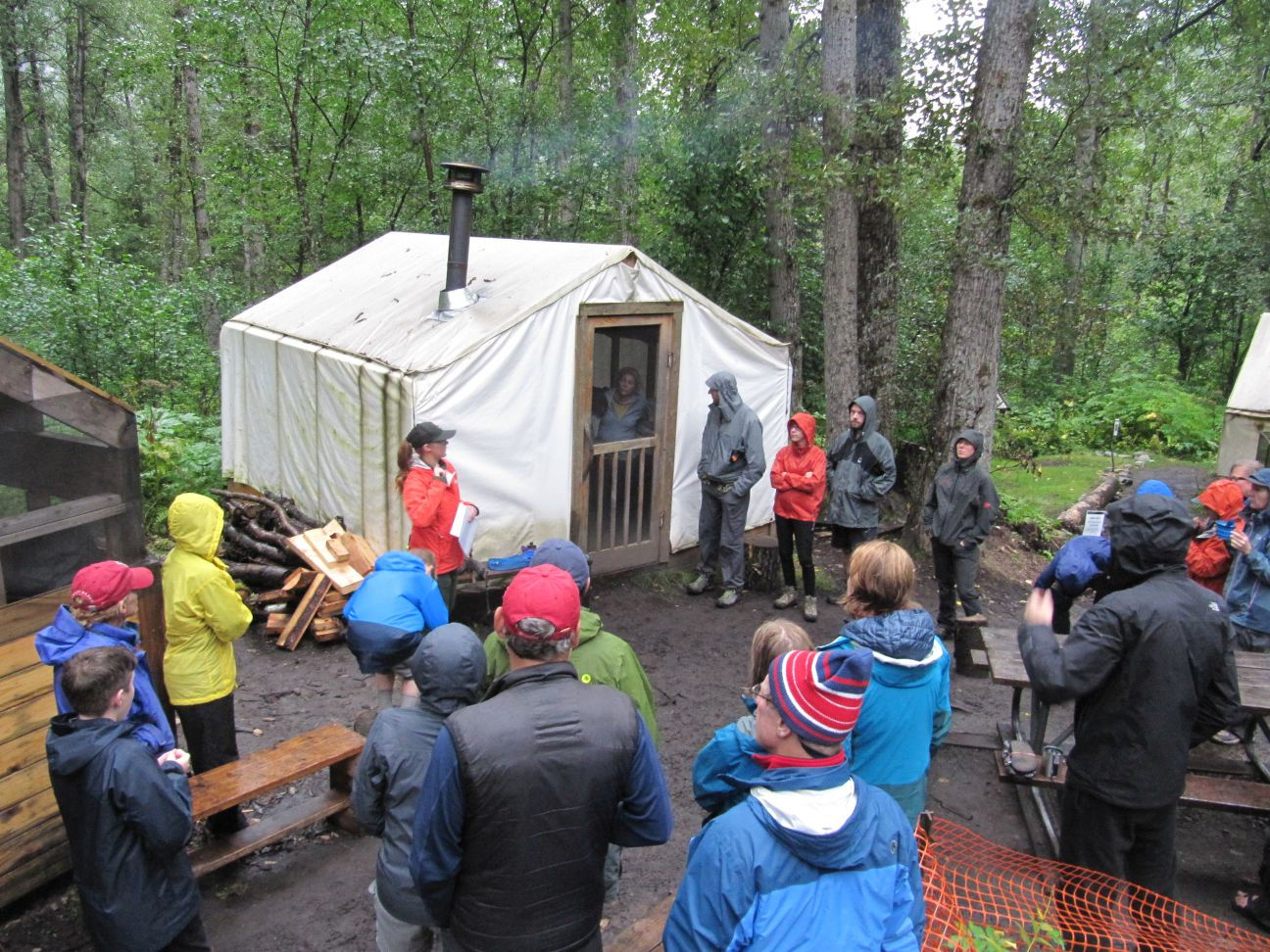
Briefing at Sheep Camp

The Chilkoot Trail is a popular recreational trail among residents of Southeast Alaska and Yukon Territory. The trail also attracts many tourists from abroad. To manage demand, and to prevent overuse and maintain the remote character of the trail, the National Park Service and Parks Canada allow no more than 50 backpackers to begin the trail each day by way of a permit system.

In return for these fees, both countries have full-time trail maintenance crews, ranger/warden stations, well-designed campgrounds, and have placed numerous interpretive signs adjacent to notable historical sites and objects.

The official hiking season (when rangers are on-duty and trail crew is on-site) varies, but usually begins in late May and ends in early September. Peak demand runs from June through August. Avalanche danger lingers into late May, as well as large snow fields that slow progress, whereas September is associated with rain and colder weather.

The Chilkoot is also a challenging ultra-run. The fastest known time belongs to ultramarathoner Geoff Roes in 5 hours and 27 minutes.

== Route and attractions ==
The Chilkoot trail features a number of natural and historical sites as shown on the map. By following the numbers on the map from south to north, the hiker will go along the same route as the old prospectors. The trip normally takes three to five days and to stay for the night, a number of designated campgrounds are made. The trail is roughly divided into three climatic zones: coastal rainforest, high alpine (above tree limit) and boreal forest. In the end it is connected to White Pass historical railway leading back to Skagway the modern port of the trail. In the following, the points of the map are highlighted with bold letters.

=== Dyea ===
Dyea is a ghost town located at the convergence of the Taiya River and Taiya Inlet on the south side of the Chilkoot Pass within the limits of the Municipality of Skagway Borough, Alaska. Confidence man and crime boss Soapy Smith, famous for his underworld control of the neighboring town of Skagway in 1897-98 is believed to have had control of Dyea as well.

The port at Dyea had shallow water, while neighboring Skagway had deep water. For a brief period between 1897 and 1899, this trail and town were full of prospectors. Dyea was abandoned when the White Pass and Yukon Route railroad chose the White Pass Trail, which begins in Skagway, over the Chilkoot Trail. By 1905, most of the buildings had been demolished or removed.

=== Coastal rainforest zone ===
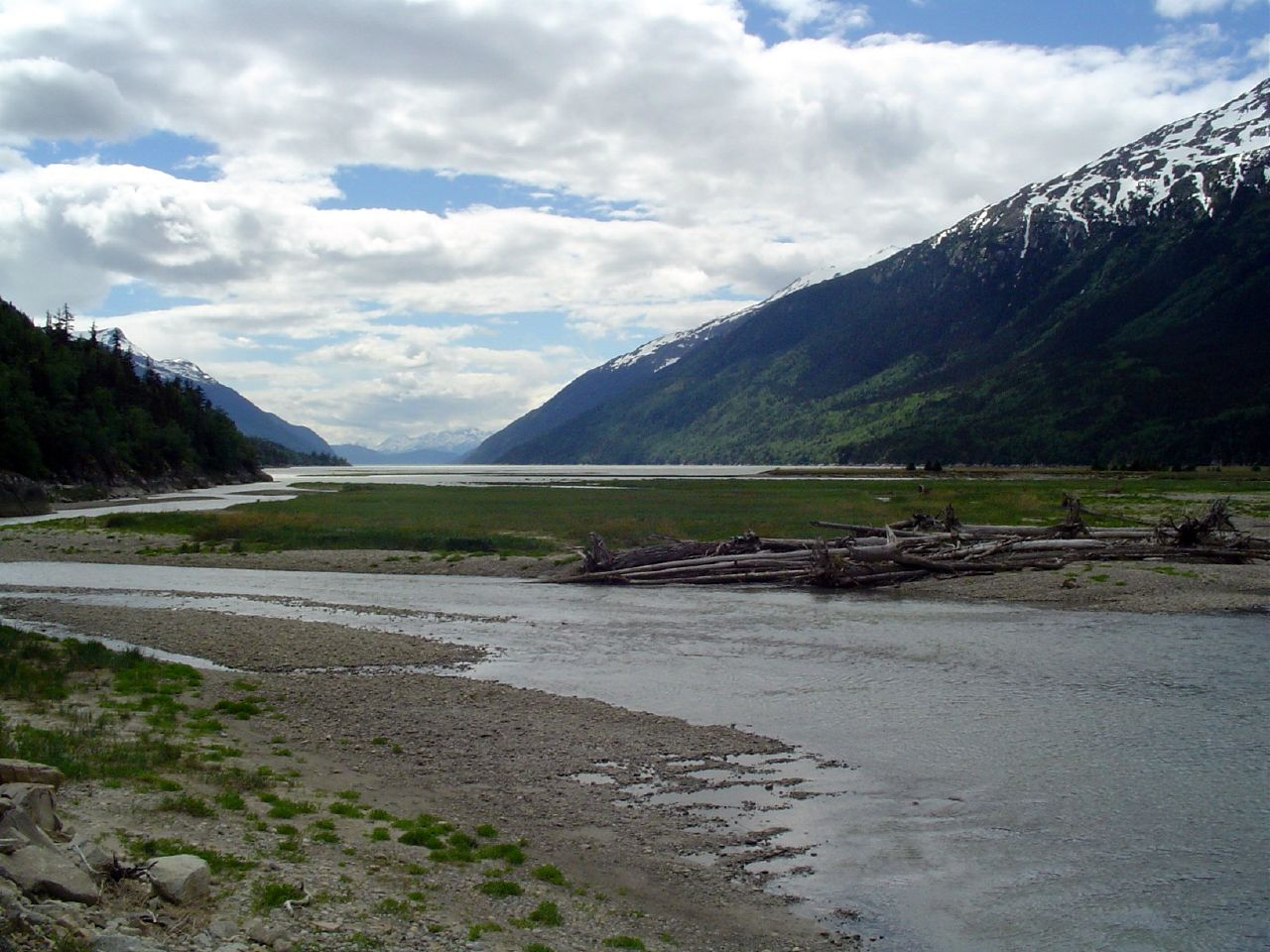
Dyea, head of Lynn Canal

The trail begins in Dyea, a ghost town and campground, 15 minutes from Skagway. From the trailhead, the route winds through coastal rainforest along to the Taiya River. The first campsite is Finnegan's Point. This stretch of the trail is in flat terrain with no substantial obstacles.

The trail becomes noticeably cooler after Finnegan's Point owing to cool air sinking down from snow and ice fields in the surrounding mountains. Numerous streams also cascade down the mountain sides. This stretch of the trail contains the least amount of visible artifacts. The next camp is Canyon City. Many hikers, especially those desiring a more modest pace or those who have had a late start, stop at Canyon City the first night. The shelter located at Canyon City houses many gold rush-era artifacts.

Close to the Canyon City campsite are the Canyon City ruins. Canyon City was a tent city during the gold rush and its ruins—building foundations, a large restaurant stove, a large boiler—are still visible. The ruins are accessible by crossing the Taiya River by suspension footbridge.

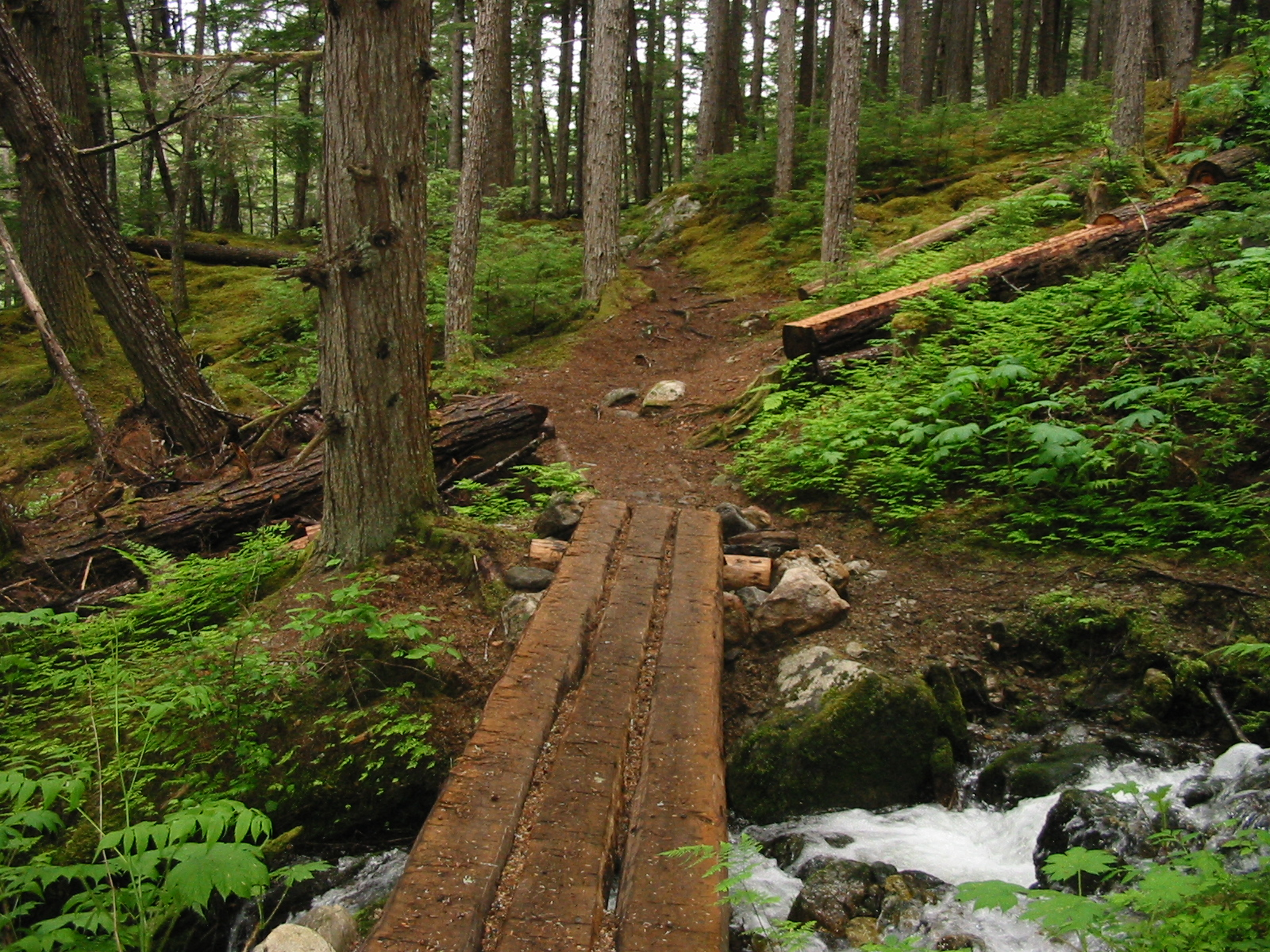
Between Finnegan's Point and Canyon City

After Canyon City ruins, the trail diverges away from the river for the first time as the river disappears into a small canyon (Canyon City's namesake) and climbs up valley wall, traversing sub-alpine forest. For many sections of the trail, old telegraph and tram wires are exposed adjacent to the trail. For the gold rush prospectors, this section of the trail was one of the most difficult. In winter, when the Taiya River was frozen, the gold rush stampeders could easily travel up the ice highway; however, in the summer this segment was described as "the worst piece of trail on the road, fairly muddy with many boulders and with some short, steep ascents and descents in and out of small gulches."

The next landmark is Pleasant Camp. There is an informational trail sign at the original site of Pleasant Camp, a quarter mile before the present Pleasant Camp campground. Pleasant Camp marks the reunion of the trail with Taiya River and serves as a lightly used, small campground. From Pleasant Camp the trail is fairly flat and weaves through forest and over small creeks.

The trail next comes to Sheep Camp, the last campground on the American side of the trail as well as the final resting stop before the trek up Chilkoot Pass. It is the largest of the campsites on the American side of the trail.

After leaving Sheep Camp and before the U.S. ranger station, the trail passes through a large avalanche chute. The slide has wiped out all previously existing forest and leaves a young brushy and alder-dominated landscape. A short distance after the ranger station is a small museum of gold rush-era artifacts in an old cabin. Soon after leaving the cabin the sub-alpine forest slowly yields to a treeless alpine landscape that allows a grand view of the rapidly narrowing Taiya River valley. As the trail climbs in altitude, its path becomes more improved, often demarcated by yellow markers planted in snowfields.

=== High alpine zone ===
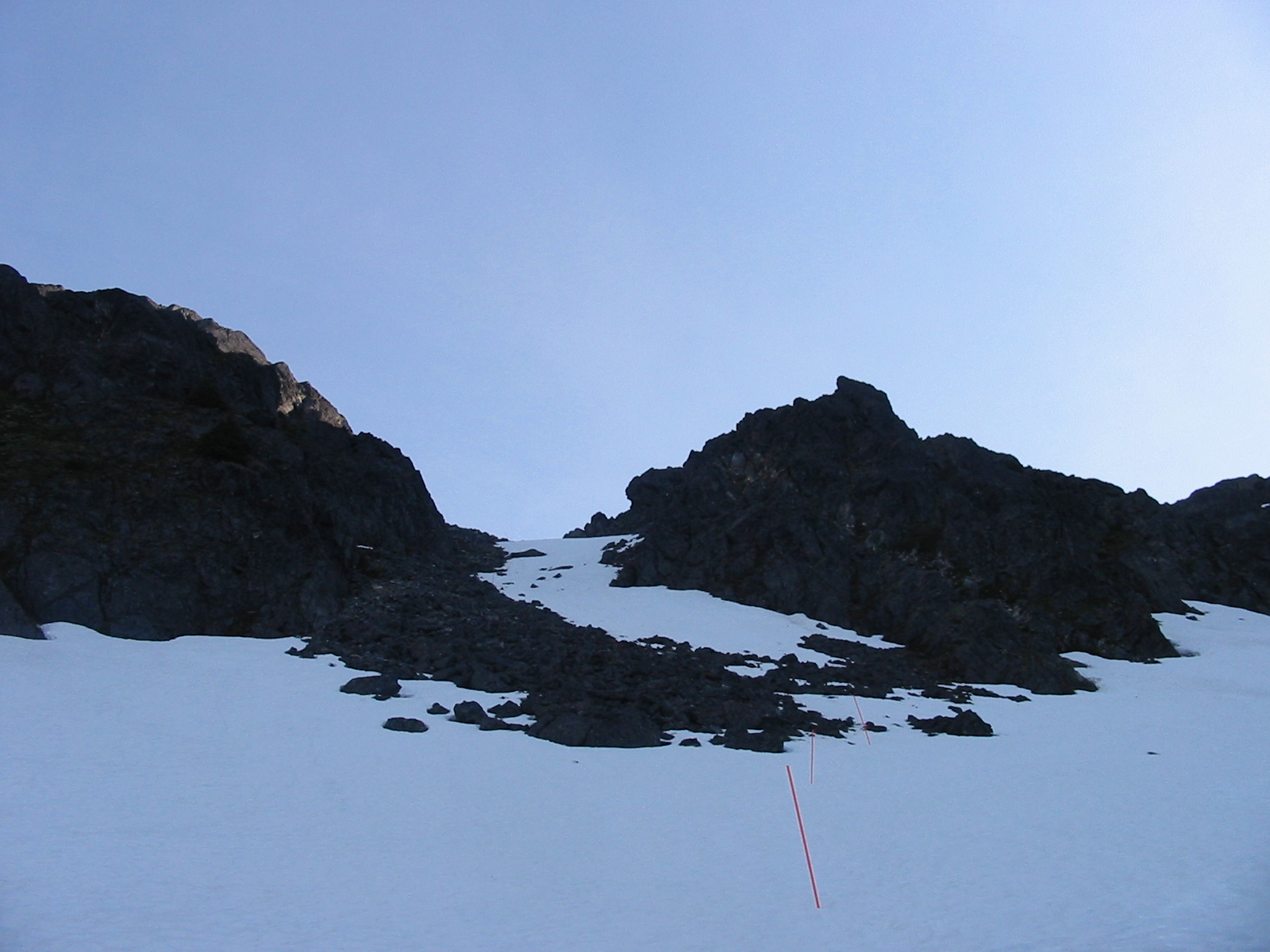
Chilkoot Pass in June

Within sight of the pass, and at the base of the "Golden Stairs" (the long difficult incline that leads to the pass), are The Scales. The Scales were a weight station where freight would be reweighed before the final trek to the pass. Often, Native packers would demand higher packing rates. The Scales also hosted a small tent city, including six restaurants, two hotels, a saloon, and many freighting offices and warehouses. The imposing Golden Stairs also prompted many would-be prospectors to turn around, often leaving behind their required ton of equipment. Because of this, and the snow's preserving properties, artifacts are prevalent at this altitude, including many remnants of wooden structures.

After The Scales is the final push up to the Chilkoot Pass: the fabled Golden Stairs. The Golden Stairs acquired its name from the steps that prospectors painstakingly carved into the snow and ice of the pass and has retained the name ever since. At the pass proper, at the Canada–US border, is a warming cabin and part-time Parks Canada warden station. Occasionally, if a party is making poor time, the warden or U.S. ranger will offer the warming cabin as an overnight shelter so to not risk the group from being caught in the barren and exposed alpine landscape between the pass and Happy Camp. There are also many artifacts scattered about the Golden Stairs and ridge lines surrounding the pass, including a cache of intact (canvas, wood, etc.) prefabricated boats on the southeastern side of the pass.

Stone Crib is situated a half mile after the pass. Stone Crib served as the terminus of the Chilkoot Railroad and Transport Company's aerial tramway, a huge rocky counterbalance for the tram. This function is still apparent today with the wooden structure collapsed along the west side of the valley.

The trail wends its way by a series of alpine lakes: First Crater Lake, Morrow Lake, and finally Happy Camp.

=== Boreal forest zone ===
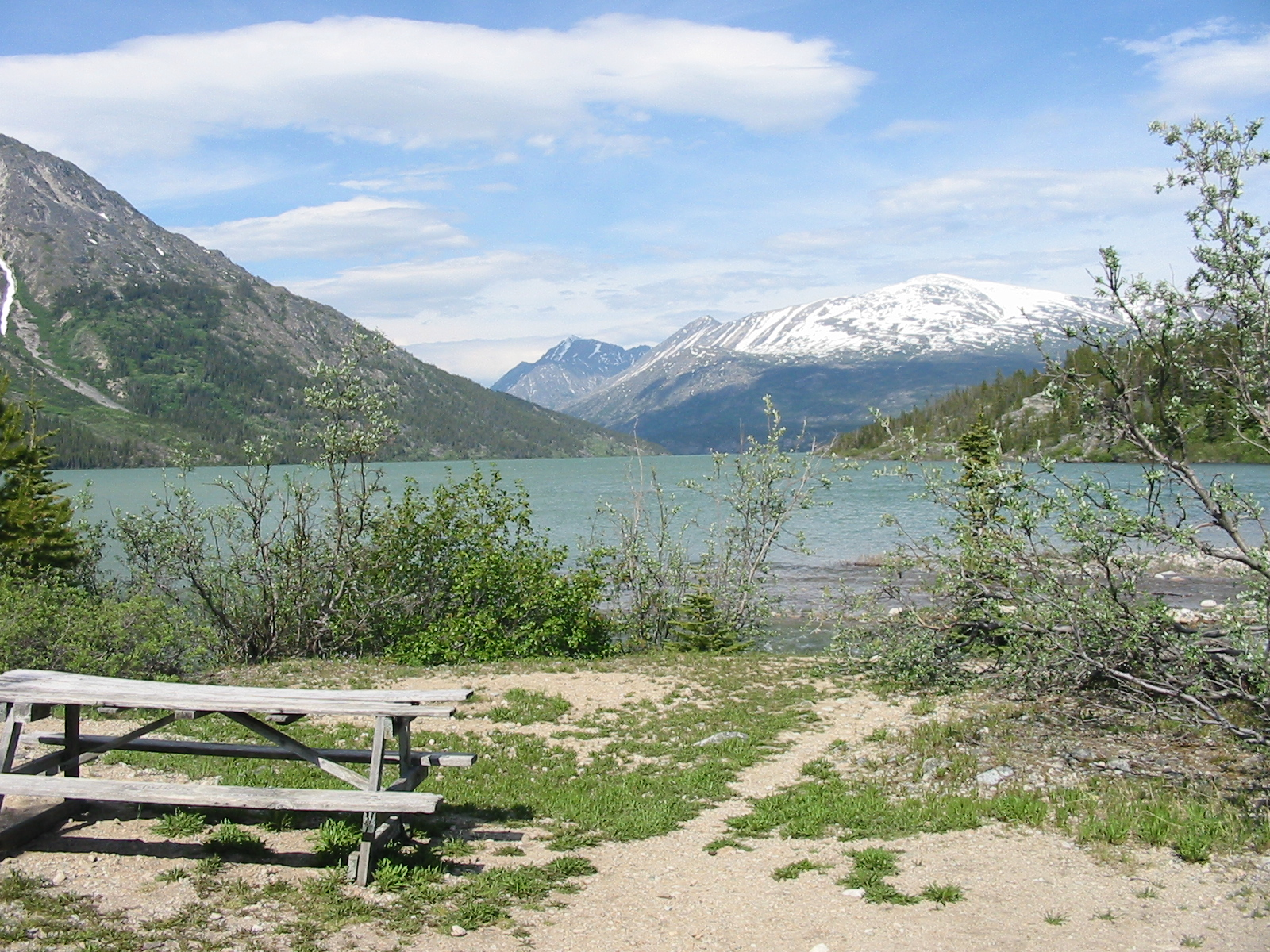
Lake Lindeman in the early summer

The trail continues to pass another couple of lakes—Long Lake and Deep Lake—before crossing tree line. Adjacent to Deep Lake, and amidst tree line, is another campground. The Canadian half of the Chilkoot Trail, in the rain shadow of the Coast Mountains, is much drier, and pine forest, first appearing at Deep Lake, readily contrasts to the more lush temperate rain forest on the U.S. half before Chilkoot Pass.

After the trail passes Deep Lake, the outlet river runs parallel to the trail for a short distance before entering a small canyon. Many boat and boat-related artifacts are visible in this area. The trail continues at a gentle decline until the turquoise-colored Lake Lindeman comes into view and the trail concludes its descent to the Lake Lindeman campground, the headquarters of Canadian trail operations.

The trail climbs a steep bluff after Lindeman and offers an expansive view of the lake and surrounding forest. After Lake Lindeman, the trail passes Bare Loon Lake and the Bare Loon Lake campground.

The trail diverges after Bare Loon Lake. One branch continues to Lake Bennett and the tracks of the White Pass & Yukon Route railroad. The other branch, the Log Cabin cut-off, connects with the Klondike Highway, but was closed by Parks Canada in 2010.

Bennett consists of a campground, a White Pass and Yukon Route depot, several houses (all private property) belonging to White Pass employees or First Nations citizens, and the only gold rush-era building still standing along the trail today, the renovated St. Andrew's Presbyterian Church. Pilings from bygone piers dot the lakeshore and an assortment of cans and other metal artifacts are scattered throughout the woods.

== Campgrounds ==
As shown on the route map there are nine designated, maintained campgrounds on the Chilkoot Trail. Camping is allowed in these places only. Hikers must use their own tents or shelters as the cabins at the campgrounds are for warming and cooking only. For cooking a backpacking stove must be brought along, even though wood stoves are available in some places. Open fires are prohibited. Use of campgrounds must be planned in advance.

In addition to the camps, a U.S. Ranger Station is located north of Sheep Camp to present the history of the pass and inform about weather and trail conditions before crossing the summit.

=== Finnegan's Point ===
Finnegan's Point then and now

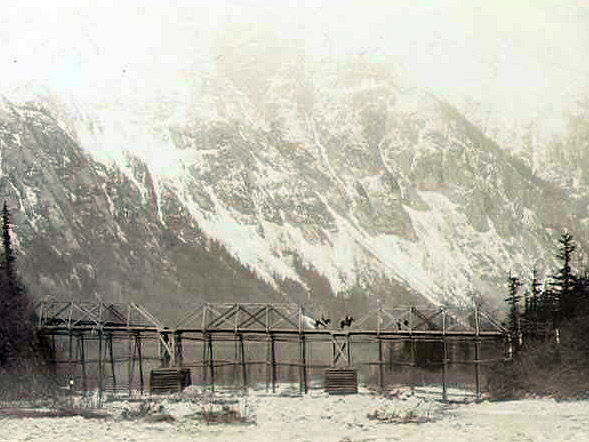
Finnegan's Point Bridge, Taiya River, 1897–98

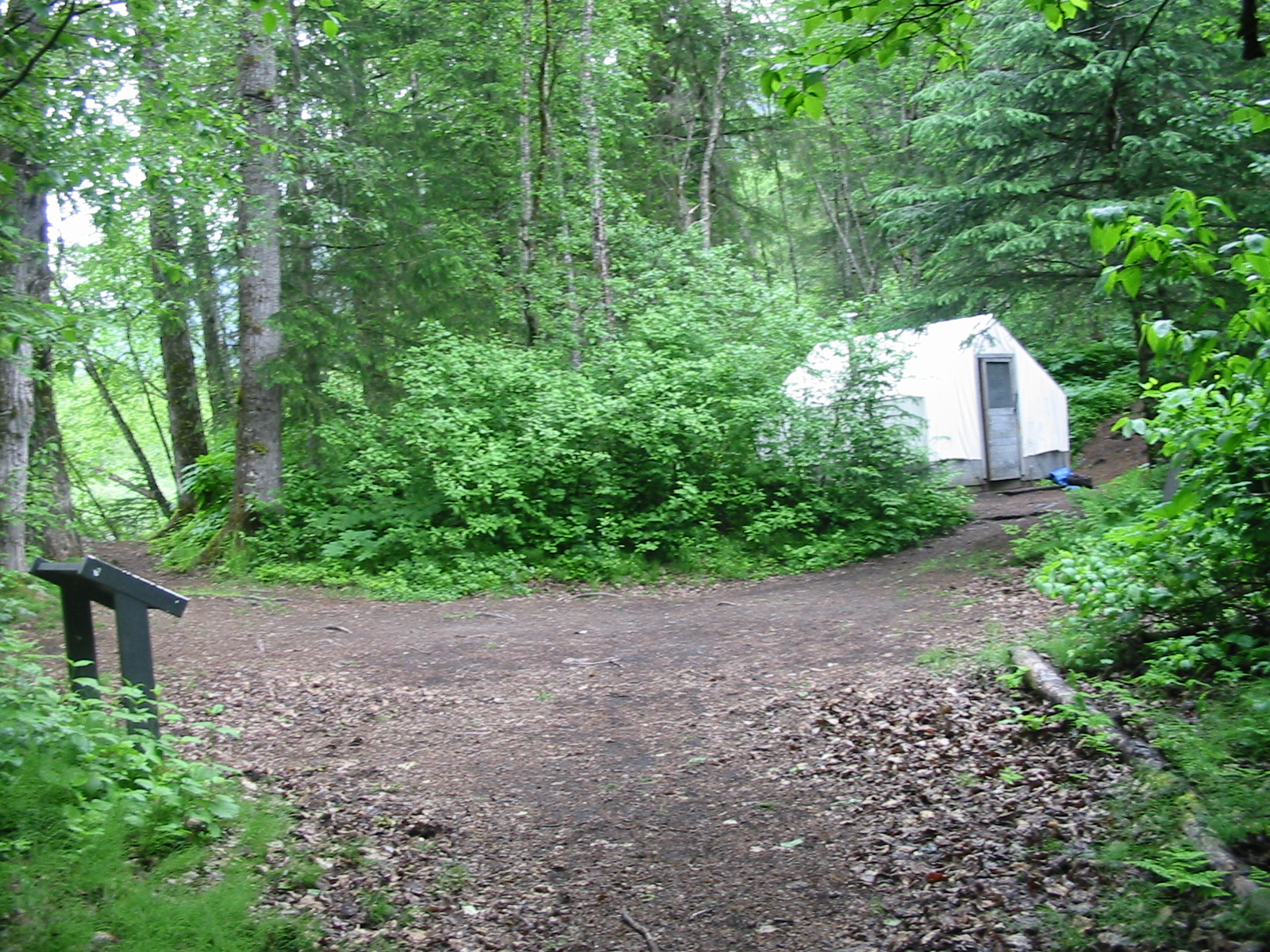
Finnegan's Point campground, 2004

This campground is located adjacent to the Taiya River while the valley is still relatively flat. The mosquitoes are very bad at Finnegan's Point partly due to its location and the abundance of standing water. The campsite itself includes a canvas warming and cooking shelter with mosquito screens, bear-proof food storage locker, an outhouse, and ample tent sites. Finnegan's Point often takes in very few hikers because of its proximity to the trailhead, and most parties pass Finnegan's Point within a few hours. However, for slower parties and those with a late start on the trail, Finnegan's Point is often the campground of choice.

The campground receives its name from Pat Finnegan, who enterprised to collect bridge-crossing tolls from stampeders. Finnegan's Point consisted of a "huddle of tents surrounding a hard core of blacksmith shop, saloon, and a restaurant."

=== Canyon City ===
The second-largest campground on the American side of the trail. It is located next to small tributary of the Taiya River. Canyon City includes a log cabin with a wood stove and several bunks (although sleeping is not permitted inside park shelters), several shelves for cooking, and a small porch for drying gear. This cabin was built by the CCC and juvenile delinquents in the 60s. Canyon City includes 16 campsites and two outhouses as well as food lockers and bear poles.

=== Pleasant Camp ===
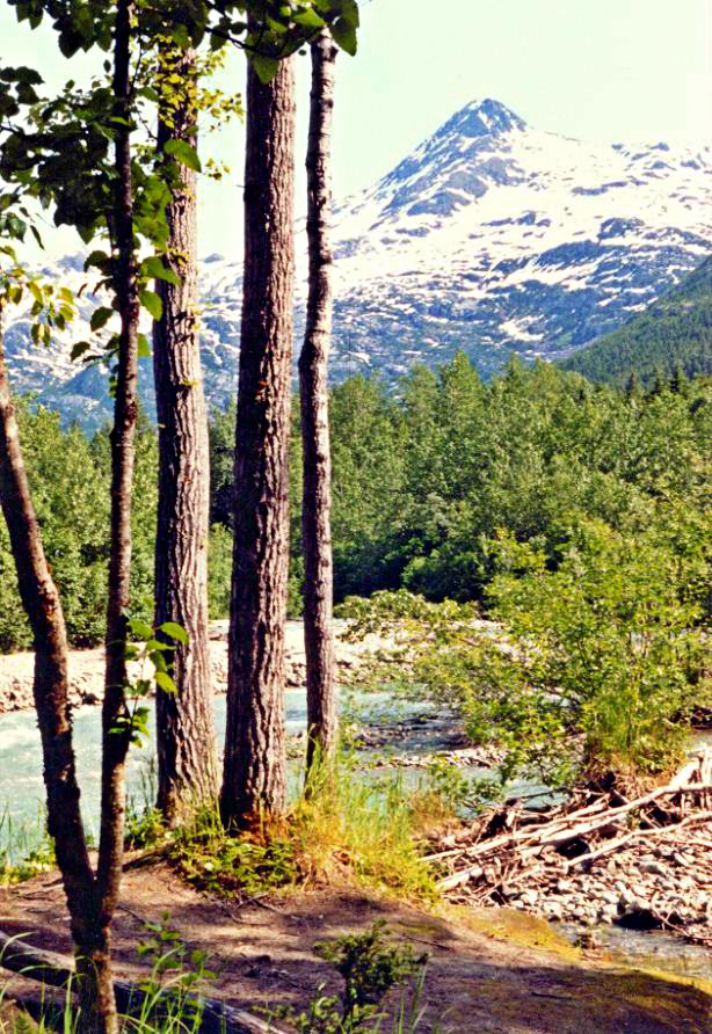
Pleasant Camp

This is the smallest of the campgrounds on the American side of the trail. It is located next to a sandbar in the Taiya River and consists of a canvas warming and cooking shelter, a small number of campsites, a bear pole and food lockers. Pleasant Camp usually serves as a spillover campsite if Sheep Camp is full. There is a sign near the cooking shelter notifying backpackers whether Sheep Camp is at capacity or can still take backpackers.

=== Sheep Camp ===
This is the largest of the American campsites. It is located adjacent to a braided Taiya River. Occasionally avalanches, rockslides, or exceptional rains, will flood Sheep Camp. Sheep Camp consists of two canvas shelters, 3 outhouses, and over 20 campsites. A large post-and-beam picnic pavilion was completed by the trail crew in 2017. The collapsed CCC cabin was rebuilt in 2018 by the trail crew. The only U.S. Ranger Station on the trail is located just a few hundred meters south of Sheep Camp and the ranger during the official season gives a nightly presentation on the history of the pass and current weather and trail conditions. From Sheep Camp many hikers leave early in the morning—as early as 4 a.m.—for the summit push into Canada. During the official hiking season the park ranger stationed just south of Sheep Camp gives a quick presentation outlining the route over the pass, the weather forecast, and snow conditions every evening in the pavilion. Rangers recommend 7.5 to 10 hours for a group to travel from Sheep Camp to Happy Camp.

=== Happy Camp ===
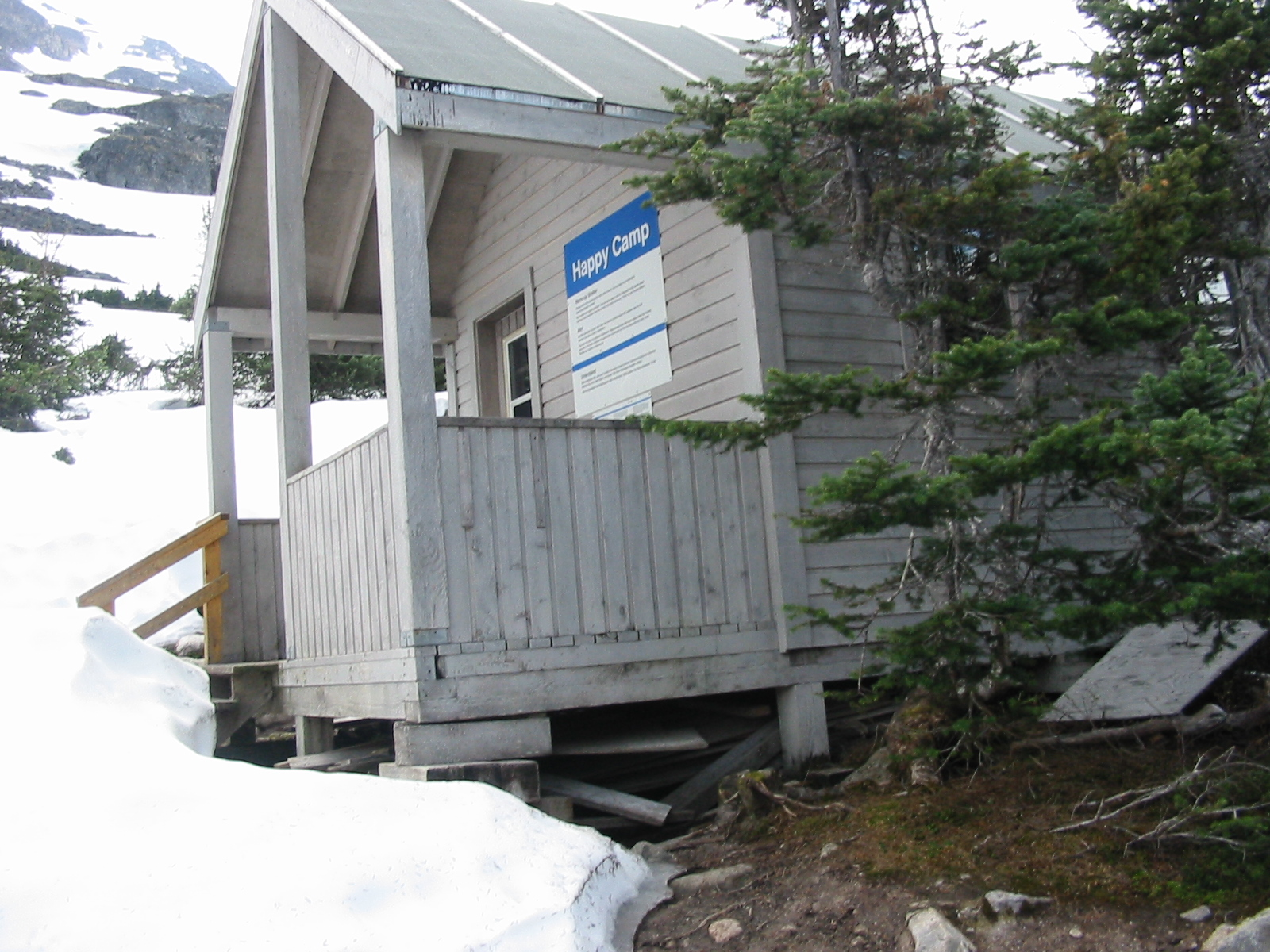
Happy Camp in the early season, 2004

Happy Camp is the only campground on the Chilkoot Trail in the alpine. A very small wooden warming cabin, an outhouse, and a modest number of campsites are all available at this campsite. Happy Camp owes its name to the relief prospectors (and hikers) experienced from arriving at the first outpost after the pass. The camp is situated in a true alpine ecosystem and receives heavy use because of its location.

=== Deep Lake ===
Deep Lake is one of only two campgrounds on the trail without permanent or semi-permanent shelter. Deep Lake includes an outside cooking area, bear proof lockers for food, and a small number of campsites. It is notable, however, for its scenic location, between the indigo hues of Long and Deep Lakes.

=== Lake Lindeman ===
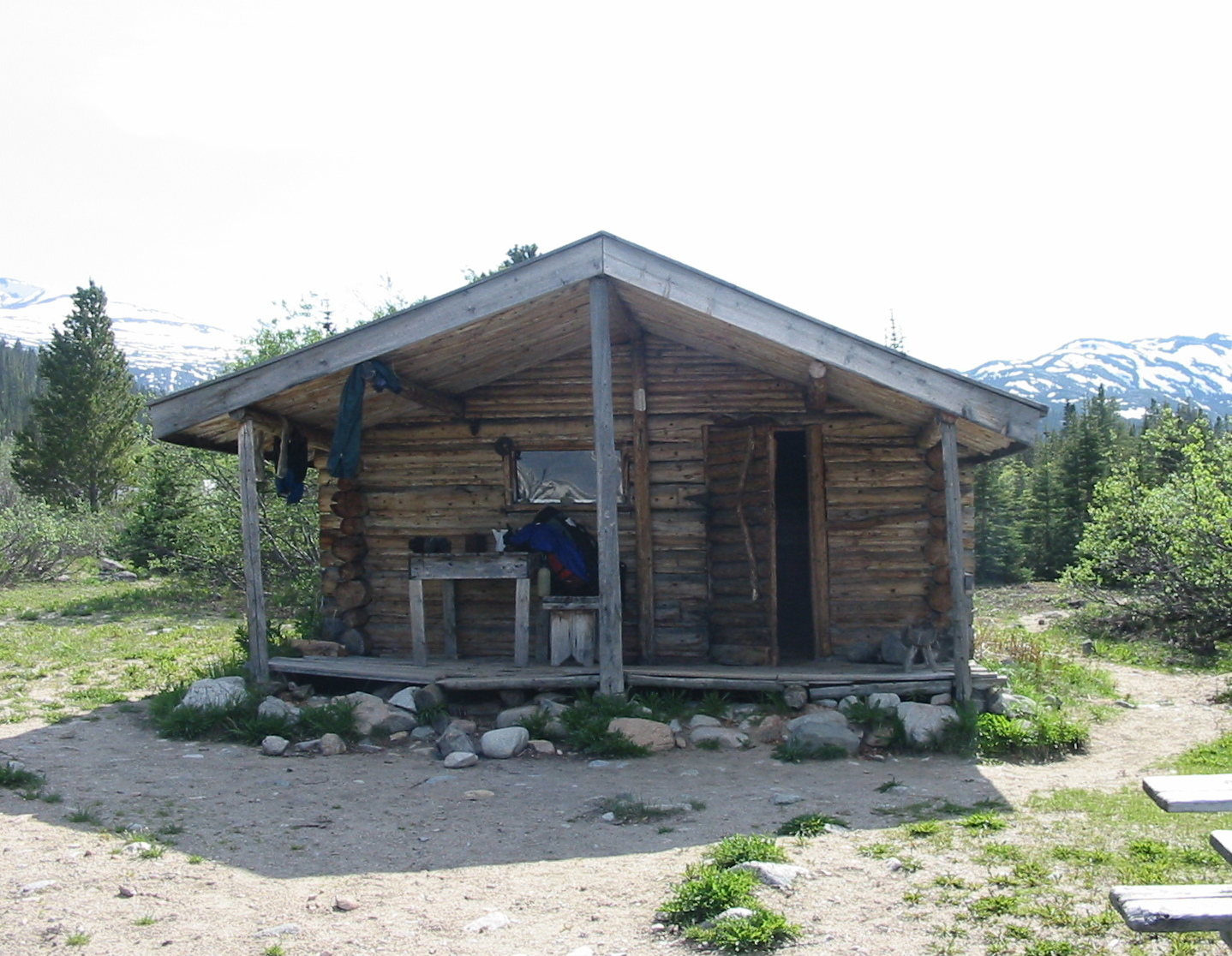
Lake Lindeman campground, 2004

The largest campground on the Canadian side. It includes separate north and south campsites, a small cluster of buildings for the trail warden and trail crew, a dock and Parks Canada powerboat, a canvas shelter containing a museum of photographs and small library on the outdoors and Klondike history, and a web of trails leading among the remains of the old town. The north and south campsites each include a large wooden cabin that serves as a cooking and warming shelter, numerous bear poles, and several picnic tables. The campsite is located on the site of what was Lindeman City during the gold rush: a cemetery of deceased prospectors from the gold rush era remains, as well as numerous foundations, former fire rings, old latrine holes, the ruts of Lindeman City's main street, and a plethora of artifacts ranging from broken wine and beer bottles to tin cans. Lake Lindeman hosts a small tent museum containing photographic displays and a small library of books on the Chilkoot, the outdoors, and other Canadian parks.

=== Bare Loon Lake ===
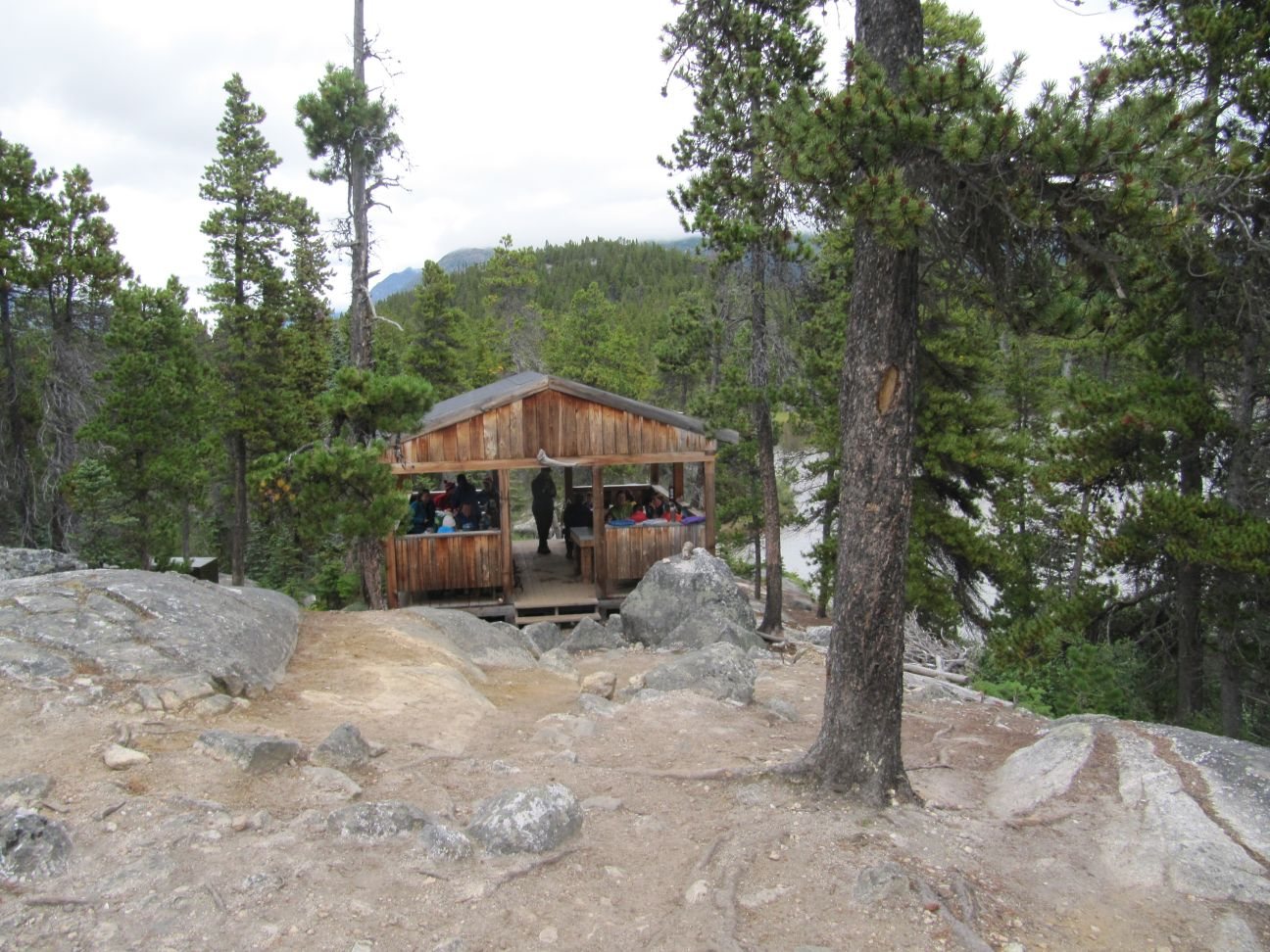
Bare Loon Lake Camp cooking shelter 2016

Bare Loon Lake is the second campground without semi-permanent shelter, though it now includes a pavilion-style cooking shelter. Located on a small ridge above Lake Lindeman in a pine forest and overlooking the Bare Loon Lake, the campground is one of the most beautiful on the trail. It includes two outhouses, a helicopter pad, and food lockers.

=== Bennett ===
This camp is the end of the trail. Several structures maintained by the White Pass and Yukon Route are clustered around the tracks, as well as a private First Nations residence. The campground is relatively small and includes bear poles, picnic tables, and an outhouse.

== Safety ==
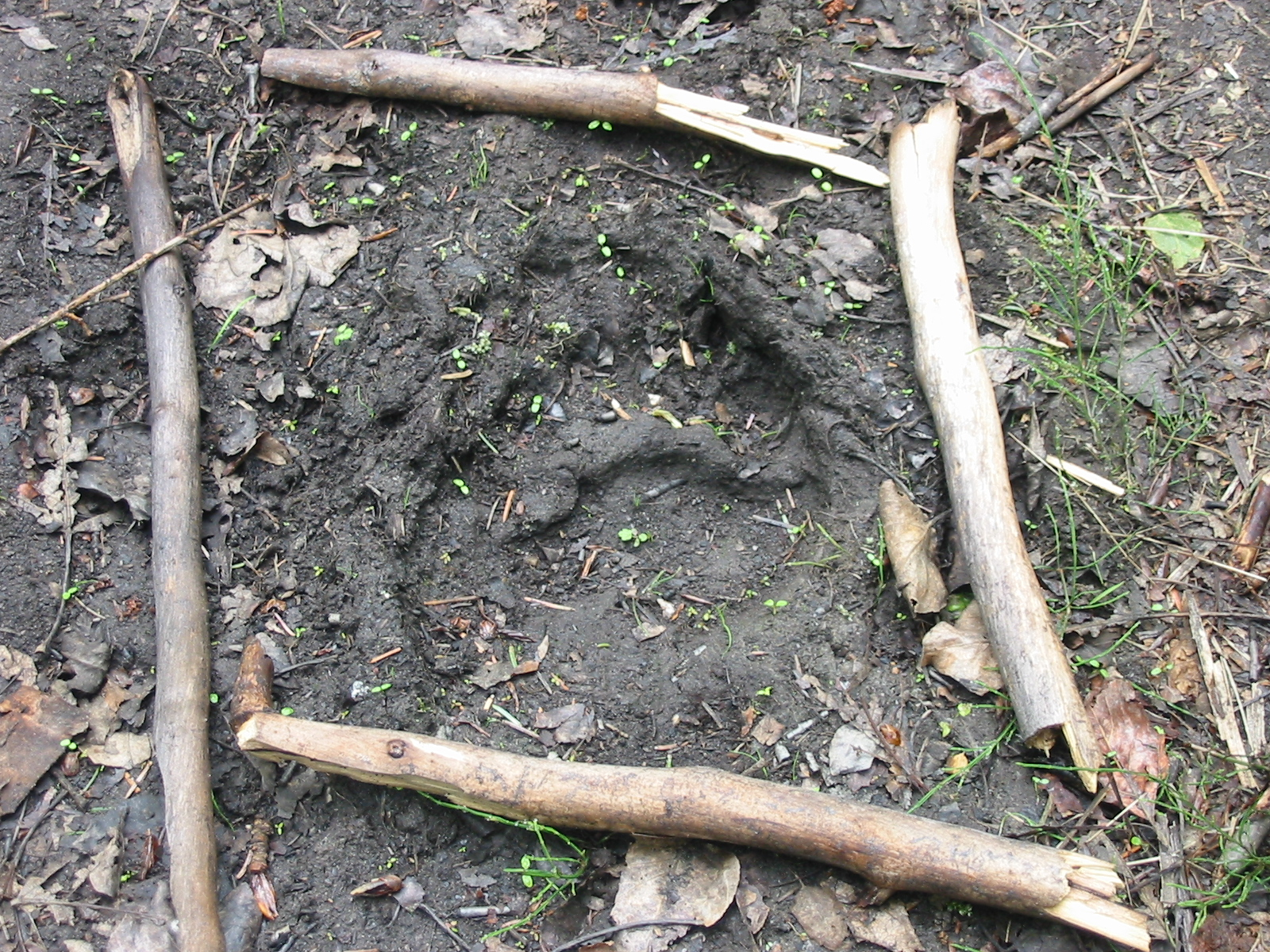
Bear track, 2004

Bears are the primary safety concern in the park. It is very common for hikers to encounter them. Firearms are not permitted on the Canadian side of Klondike Gold Rush International Historical Park. Almost all parties take bear spray and/or bear bangers as repellents, but most importantly both sides of the park mandate smart bear practices. It is required to stow food in bear-safe locations.

Weather and terrain also pose a challenge to hikers. There are few risks in the forest regions of the trail, however once the trail climbs into the alpine, weather and the elements pose more of a concern; the same does vertigo. Often the American ranger from Sheep Camp sweeps late in the day up to Chilkoot Pass to monitor for straggling groups that may not make Happy Camp and would be in need of emergency shelter.

== Klondike supply list ==
The list shows a suggestion of equipment needed for prospectors before they were allowed entry into Canada at the summit of the Chilkoot Pass, 1897–1899. Total weight: 1 ton.

- 150 lb (68 kg) bacon
- 400 lb (180 kg) flour
- 25 lb (11 kg) rolled oats
- 125 lb (57 kg) beans
- 10 lb (4.5 kg) tea
- 10 lb (4.5 kg) coffee
- 25 lb (11 kg) sugar
- 25 lb dried potatoes
- 2 lb (0.9 kg) dried onions
- 15 lb (6.8 kg) salt
- 1 lb (0.45 kg) pepper
- 75 lb (34 kg) dried fruits
- 8 lb (3.6 kg) baking powder
- 2 lb (0.9 kg) soda
- 0.5 lb (0.2 kg) evaporated vinegar
- 12 oz (0.3 kg) compressed soup
- 1 can mustard
- 1 tin matches (for four men)
- Stove for four men
- Gold pan for each
- Set granite buckets
- Large bucket
- Knife, fork, spoon, cup, and plate
- Frying pan
- Coffee and teapot
- Scythe stone
- Two picks and one shovel
- One whipsaw
- Pack strap
- Two axes for four men and one extra handle
- Six 8-inch (200 mm) files and two taper files for the party
- Draw knife, brace and bits, jack plane, and hammer for party
- 200 feet (60 m) of 3/8-inch (9.5 mm) rope
- 8 lb (3.6 kg) of pitch and 5 lb (2.3 kg) of oakum for four men
- Nails, five each of 6, 8, 10 and 12 penny, for four men
- Tent, 10 by 12 feet (3.0 m × 3.7 m) for four men
- Canvas for wrapping
- Two oil blankets to each boat
- 5 yd (4.6 m) of mosquito netting for each man
- 3 suits of heavy underwear
- 1 heavy mackinaw coat
- 2 pairs heavy mackinaw trousers
- 1 heavy rubber-lined coat
- 1 dozen heavy wool socks
- ½ dozen heavy wool mittens
- 2 heavy overshirts
- 2 pairs heavy snagproof rubber boots
- 2 pairs shoes
- 4 pairs blankets (for two men)
- 4 towels
- 2 pairs overalls
- 1 suit oil clothing
- Several changes of summer clothing
- Small assortment of medicines

== See also ==
- Backpacking (hiking)
- Long-distance trails in the United States
- National Historic Sites of Canada
- Klondike Trail
