= Taiya Inlet =

Water body in Alaska, USA

Coordinates: 59°22′24″N 135°22′10″W

Taiya Inlet

Taiya Inlet is part of the upper Lynn Canal located in the U.S. state of Alaska. Taiya Inlet is an estuary which lies in a deep valley, with Skagway, Alaska at its north end and the remainder of the Lynn Canal at its south end.

== History ==
Taiya Inlet received its name in 1868. Taiya was derived from the Tlingit term tayee, which means beneath or underneath. It was also called Dayday Inlet and Dejah Inlet but the latter two names fell out of favor. Taiya Inlet was an important waterway during the Klondike Gold Rush offering passage to the deep-water port of Skagway and, by smaller boat (due to sediment from the Taiya River), the now-ghost town of Dyea. These two boom towns were gateways to the respective White Pass and Chilkoot trails.

== Current status ==
Currently Taiya Inlet is used for marine transportation (such as the Alaska Marine Highway) and recreation such as fishing. The Taiya Inlet Watershed Council is also dedicating to its preservation.
