= Taiya River =

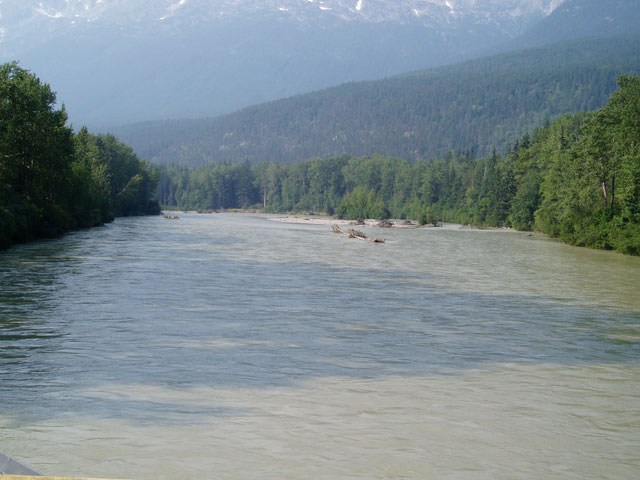
- The Taiya River a few miles from the mouth

- Location of the mouth of the Taiya River in Alaska

Location
- Country: United States
- State: Alaska

Physical characteristics
- Source
  - coordinates: 59°41′52″N 135°15′51″W
- Mouth: Taiya Inlet
  - coordinates: 59°28′48″N 135°20′52″W
- Length: 27 km (17 mi)

The Taiya River (also Dyea River) is a 17-mile-long (27 km) river in the U.S. state of Alaska running from the border with British Columbia, Canada, to the Taiya Inlet of upper Lynn Canal.

== Geography ==
The Taiya River is unique as it passes through a number of different ecosystems over a short distance. From alpine tundra to temperate rainforest a variety of fauna and flora reside in the Taiya River and its valley. The Taiya River valley and the synonymous Taiya River watershed are actually confined to a very small area as the valley is a very steep-sided glaciated valley (as a sidenote, because of glaciation, the valley is also experiencing post-glacial rebound). There are a number of small glaciers and icefields that the river drains from the surrounding mountains, but for the most part, it's relatively a very small watershed for its size. The Taiya River delta is quite expansive and makes the adjacent portion of the Taiya Inlet very shallow.

== History ==
The Taiya River received its name when the Tlingit word Taiya became noted as a common usage for the body of water in 1868.

The Taiya River is historically significant with its role in the Klondike Gold Rush. The river's terminus, the Taiya Inlet, was also home to the Klondike boom town of Dyea which was the start of the Chilkoot Trail. The sediment from the Taiya River in the Taiya Inlet made a deep-water dock in Dyea impossible.

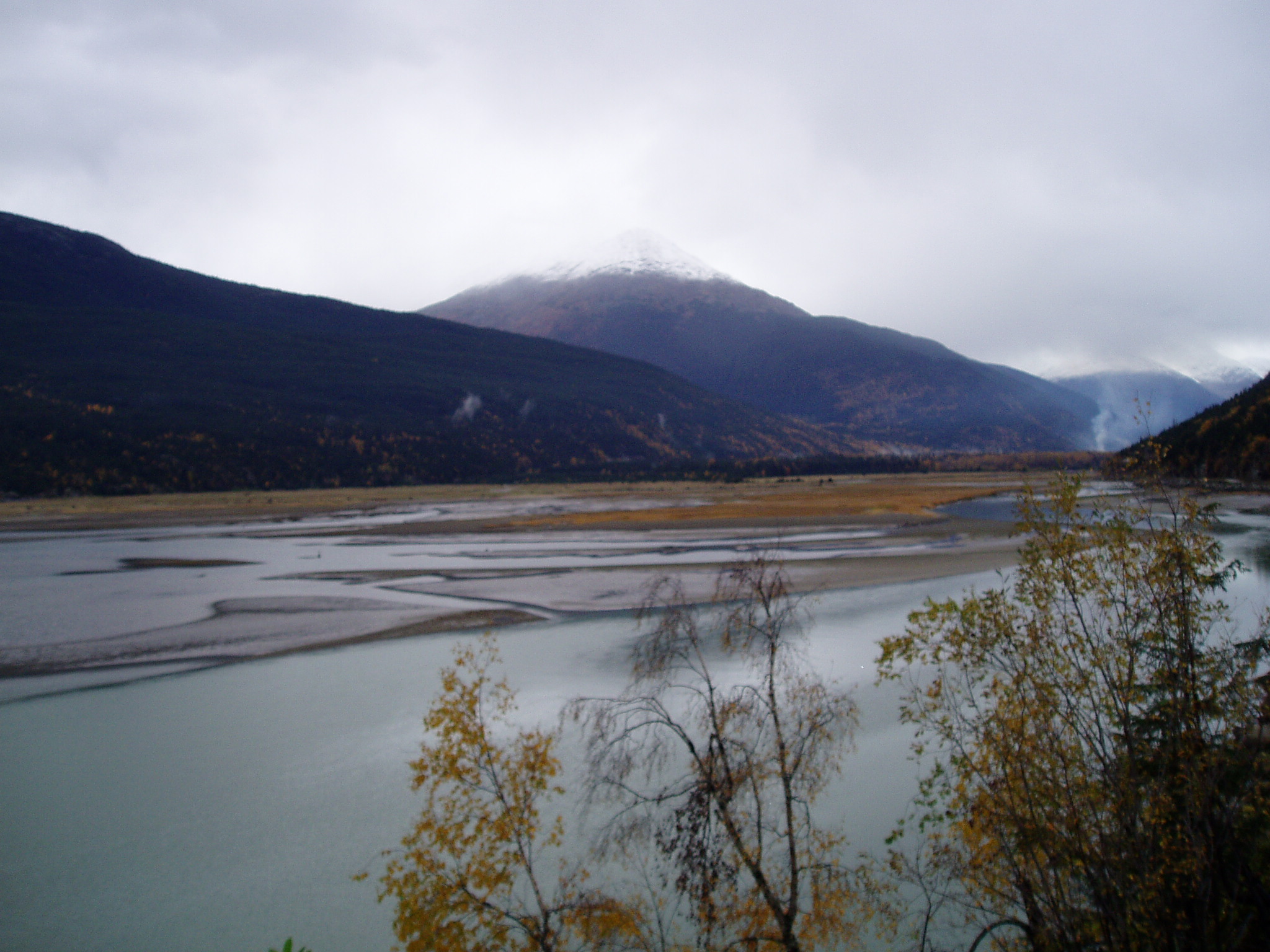
A picture of the Taiya River estuary from the Dyea Road.

This was one (but not the only reason) for the construction of the White Pass and Yukon Route taking the Skagway-White Pass route instead of the Dyea-Chilkoot Pass route which effectively sealed the fate of both the Chilkoot Trail and the town of Dyea. The Taiya was also a key component of transportation during the gold rush days. During the winter the river would freeze over allowing significantly easier transportation (especially with sledges and pack animals) than the overland trail. This was especially true when the Taiya went into a canyon between Canyon City and Pleasant Camp and the overland trail was especially difficult.

== Current status ==
Today the Taiya River is a centerpiece of the Klondike Gold Rush National Historical Park and the Chilkoot Trail it protects. It's also the recipient of rafting tours based out of Skagway and has an anadromous fish population that is popular with fishermen. It has a watershed council, the Taiya Inlet Watershed Council partially dedicating to its protection and its recreational users.

== See also ==
- List of rivers of Alaska
