= Emerald Lake (Yukon) =

Lake in Yukon, Canada

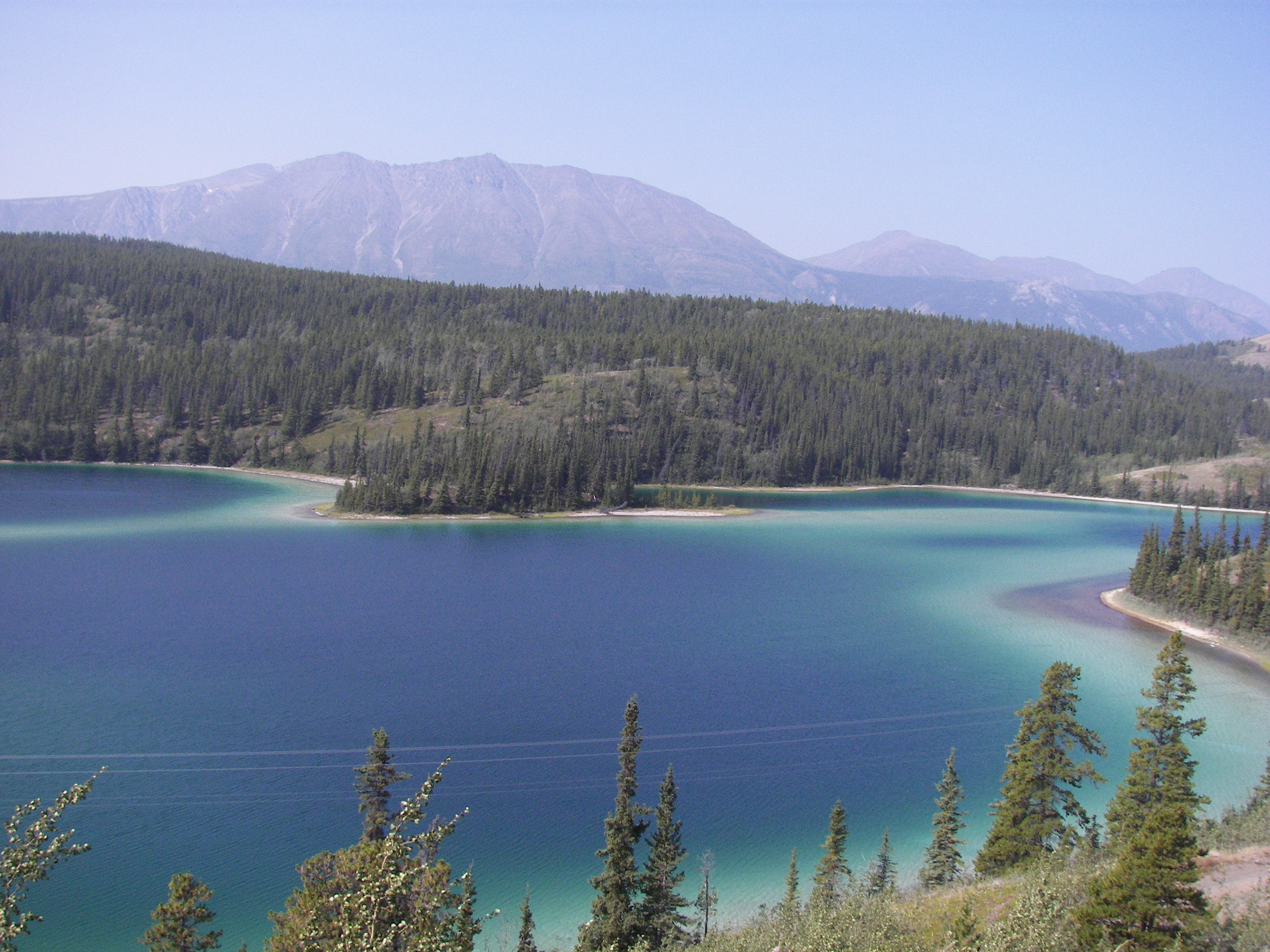

- Location: Yukon Territory, Canada
- Coordinates: 60°15′58.8″N 134°45′02.6″W

Emerald Lake is a lake in the southern Yukon, notable for its intense green colour. It is located on the South Klondike Highway at kilometre 117.5 (mile 73.5), measured from Skagway, Alaska. The colour derives from light reflecting off white deposits of marl, a mixture of clay and calcium carbonate, at the bottom of the shallow waters.

The high concentration of calcium carbonate in the water here comes from limestone gravels eroded from the nearby mountains and deposited here 14,000 years ago by the glaciers of the last ice age. Glacial erosion was likewise responsible for scooping out the shallow lakebed.

Natural hypoxic conditions during the summer may contribute to carbonate deposition and marl formation.

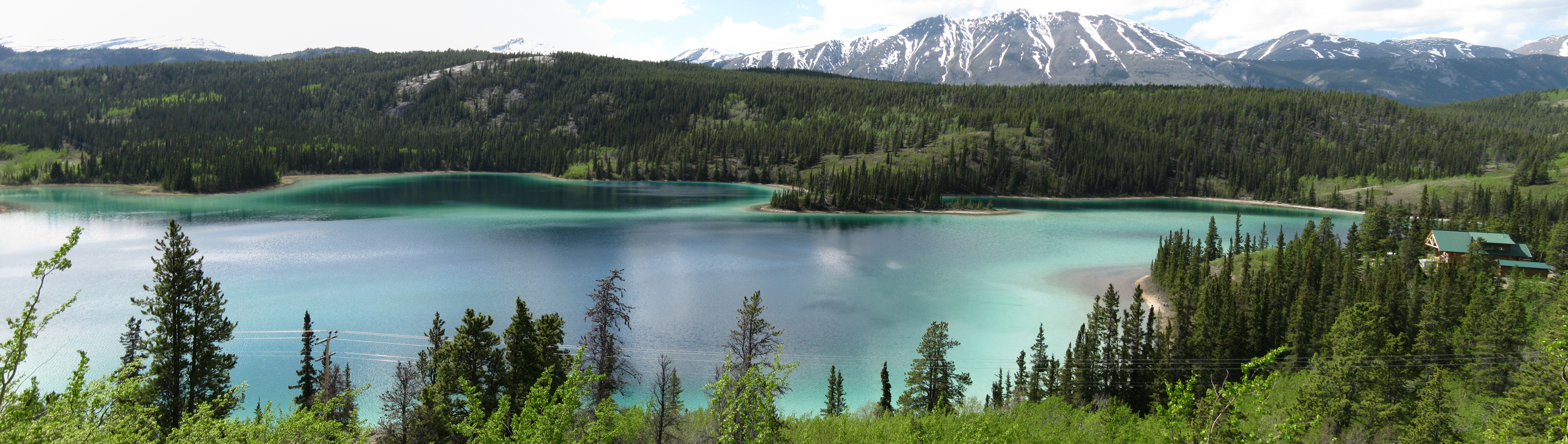
A wide view of Emerald Lake from the adjacent highway.
