= White Pass =

Mountain pass in the U.S. and Canada

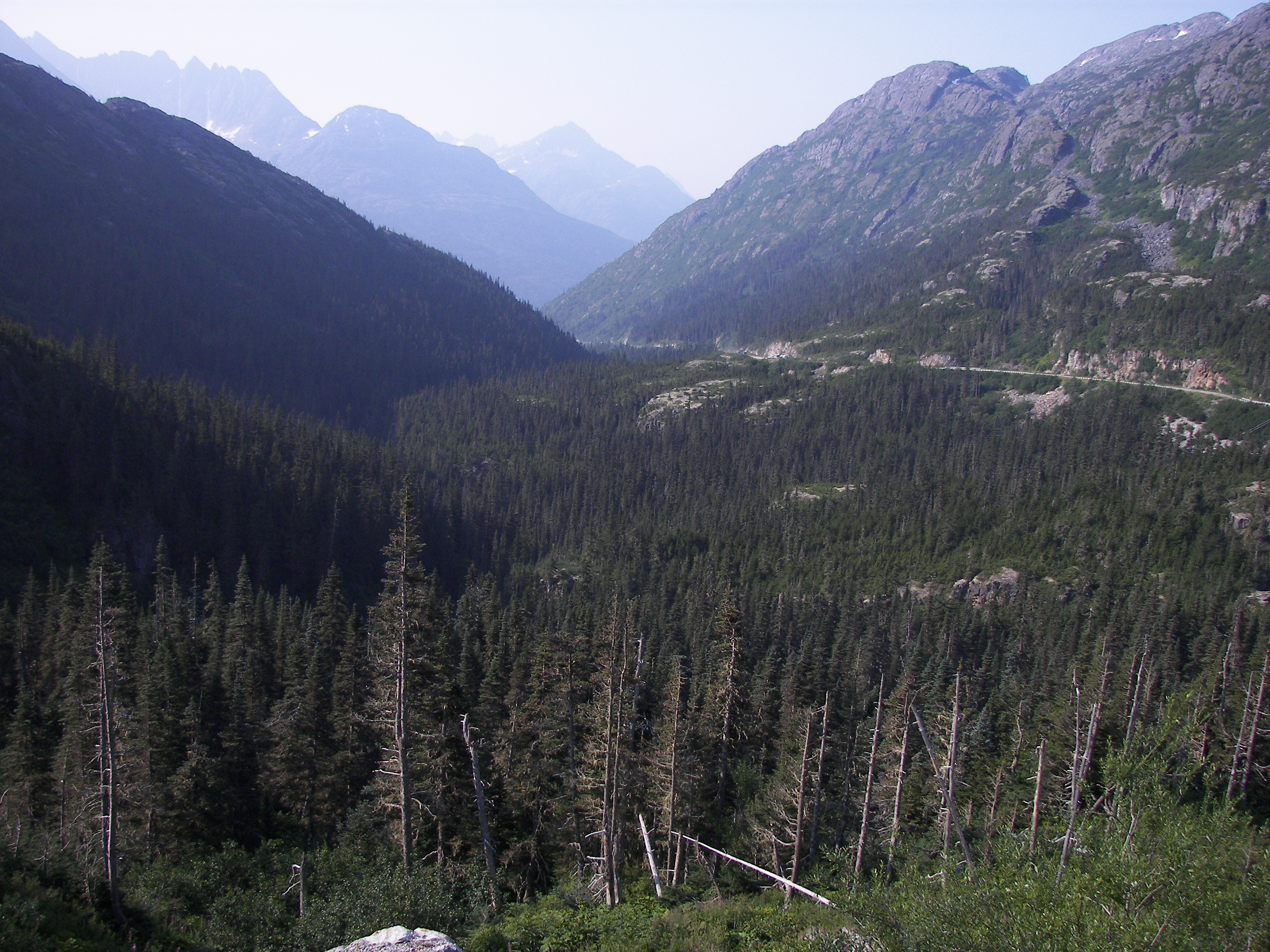

- Location within Alaska Location within British Columbia
- Elevation: 873 m (2,864 ft)

Location
- Location: Atlin District, Canada / Municipality of Skagway Borough, Alaska, United States
- Range: Boundary Ranges
- Coordinates: 59°37′29″N 135°08′17″W
- Topo map: NTS 104M11 White Pass

White Pass, also known as the Dead Horse Trail (elevation 873 m or 2,864 ft), is a mountain pass through the Boundary Ranges of the Coast Mountains on the border of the U.S. state of Alaska and the province of British Columbia, Canada. It leads from Skagway, Alaska, to the chain of lakes at the headwaters of the Yukon River (Crater Lake, Lake Lindeman, and Bennett Lake).

== History ==
The White Pass was closely controlled by the Chilkoot Indians and was unknown to non-natives until 1887. While in Juneau, William Ogilvie had heard reports of a low pass near the Deyes Inlet to the headwaters of the Lewes River (Yukon River). The Ogilvie expedition was on its way to the Yukon territory in order to survey and mark the international boundary on the Yukon River. In June 1887, Ogilvie's expedition was at the head of Taiya Inlet doing a survey from Pyramid Island up through the Chilkoot Pass. William Moore, who had travelled up from Juneau on the steamer, had experience building roads in mountainous areas and wanted to try this route since the Chilkoot Pass was reported to be too steep for a wagon road. They had heard rumors about another lower pass that the Chilkoot Indians controlled. Ogilvie made inquiries and learned there was such a pass. An Indian named Jim, after much talk and encouragement, was persuaded to reveal it. Moore and his guide went over this low altitude pass. Ogilvie and his surveying party ascended the Chilkoot Pass. Among the many Chilkoot Indians hired to carry their supplies up the pass was Skookum Jim Mason, who, with his family, discovered the rich gold deposits in the Klondike. Moore did a rough survey of the new pass and returned with the satisfaction that he had found the route for his wagon road. The White Pass was named for the Canadian Minister of the Interior Thomas White by William Ogilvie.

William Moore and his son returned to stake a homesteader's claim in Skagua, as it was then known. They built a cabin and a wharf and surveyed a town site they called Mooresville. In 1894, the North-West Mounted Police arrived at Dyea and Mooresville on their way to Canada's Yukon Territory. The first group of prospectors hiked up Moore's crude trail over the White Pass. Once the gold rush began, the Moores were overrun. Mooresville was resurveyed by Frank Reid as Skaguay. The crude trail was made into a toll road by George A. Brackett, and the North-West Mounted Police guarded the passes and briefly maintained a post in Skaguay, which Canada claimed.

=== Gold rush years ===
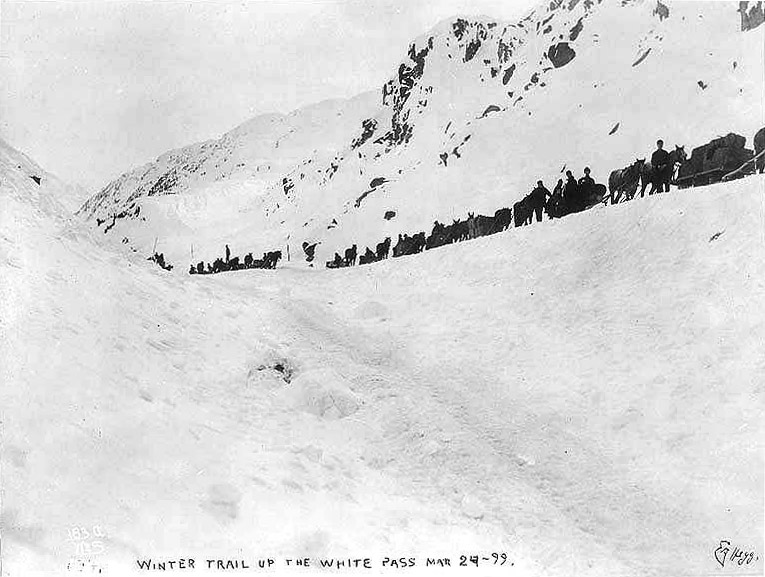
White Pass trail in 1899

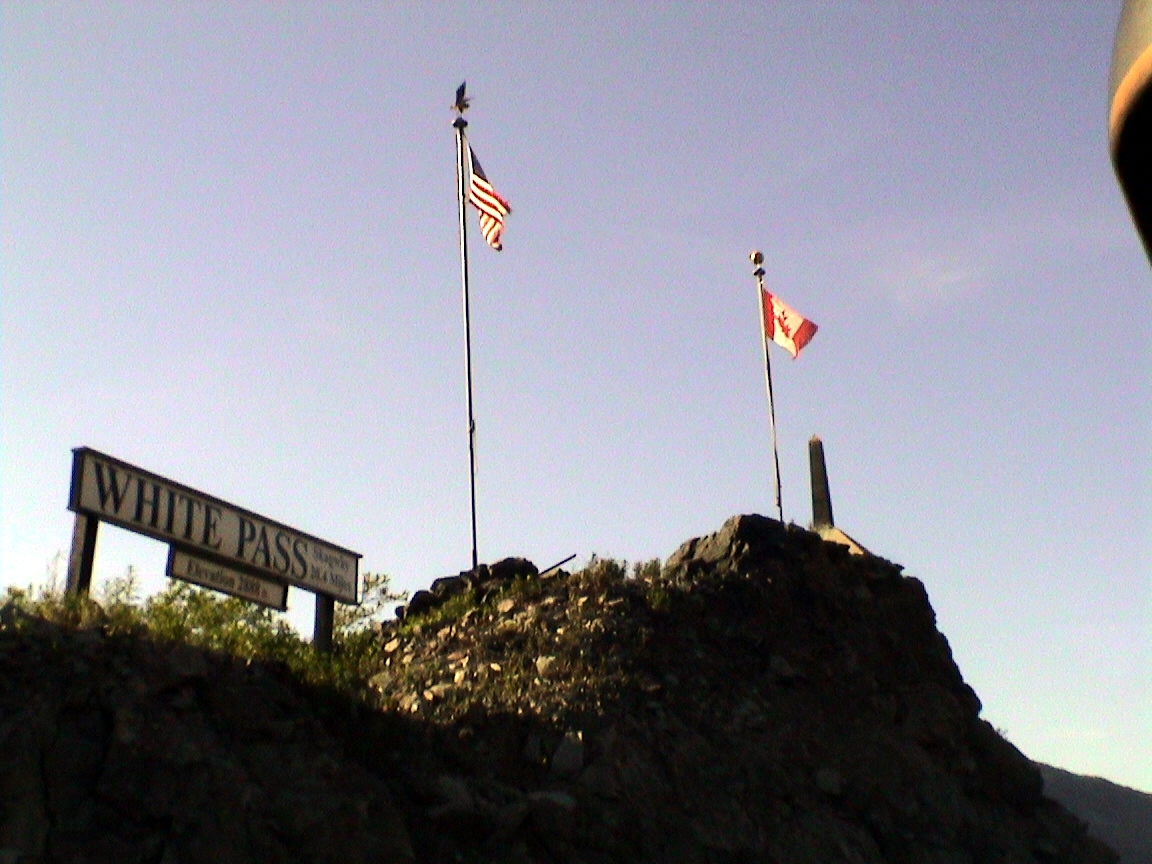
White Pass summit seen from train, 2002

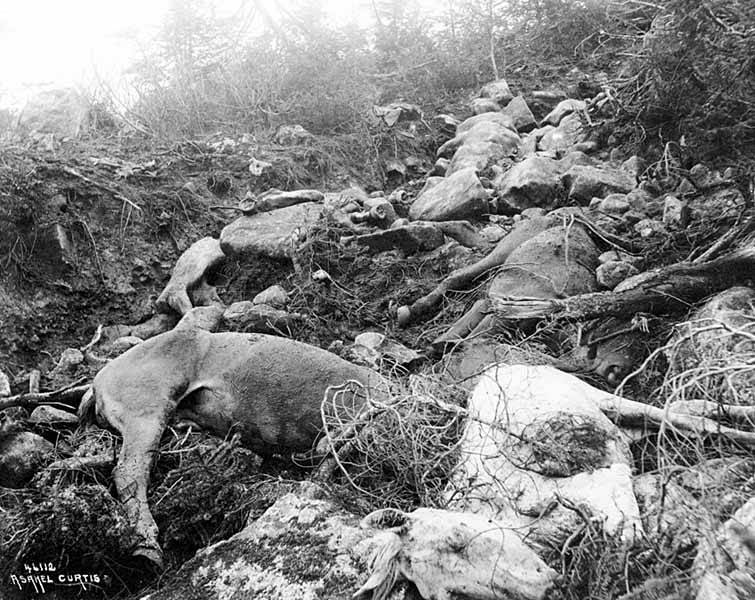
Dead horses, victims of the rush to cross White Pass, Alaska-British Columbia, during the summer of 1897

The White Pass trail was one of the two main passes used by prospectors during the Klondike Gold Rush. The White Pass was an easier route to Lake Bennett than the Chilkoot Trail a few kilometers to the west, but it harbored a criminal element that preyed on the cheechakos (newcomers to the Klondike). These con artists were believed to be members of the infamous Soapy Smith gang from Skagway, Alaska. In 1898, Smith was killed at the famed Shootout on Juneau Wharf and his gang were run out of Skagway and the White Pass. So many horses died during the gold rush, the trail became known as the "Dead Horse Trail". The trail ended at Lake Bennett, where the prospectors built or purchased rafts or boats to float down the Yukon River to the Klondike gold fields near Dawson City.

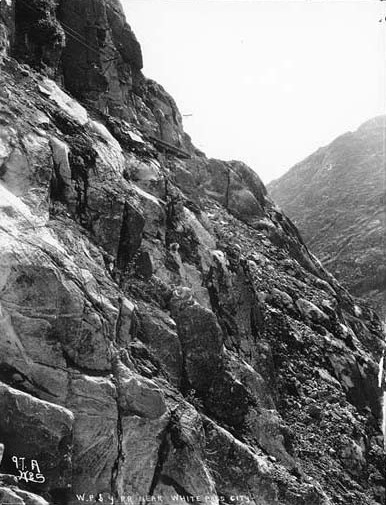
Photograph of the W.P. & Y.R. near White Pass by Eric A. Hegg ca. 1899

The White Pass and Yukon Route (W.P. & Y.R.) narrow-gauge railroad was built between 1898 and 1900 through White Pass. The southern end of the Klondike Highway also uses the White Pass and parallels the railway.

Current services at White Pass Summit station
Preceding station	White Pass and Yukon Route	Following station
Skagway, Alaska (U.S.) with stops in Laughton and Denver Terminus	Bennett Scenic Journey	Fraser, B.C. (Canada) toward Carcross
Skagway, Alaska (U.S.) with stops in Laughton and Denver Terminus	Steam Excursion	Fraser, B.C. (Canada) toward Bennett
Skagway, Alaska (U.S.) with stops in Laughton and Denver Terminus	White Pass Summit Excursion	Terminus

The Skagway Historic District and White Pass is a U.S. National Historic Landmark.

Due to the harsh climate, grueling conditions, and length of journey, travelers on both the Chilkoot Trail and White Pass suffered from widespread starvation. Many of the starving people on the White Pass made meals of dead horses they found along the road.

== Climate ==
There is a weather station for the Captain William Moore Bridge on the Alaskan side of White Pass, located near the summit at an elevation of 2250 ft (686 m).

Climate data for Moore Creek Bridge, Alaska, 2005-2023 normals, 2004-2023 extremes: 2250ft (686m)
Month	Jan	Feb	Mar	Apr	May	Jun	Jul	Aug	Sep	Oct	Nov	Dec	Year
Record high °F (°C)	48 (9)	44 (7)	51 (11)	56 (13)	73 (23)	80 (27)	81 (27)	79 (26)	68 (20)	56 (13)	44 (7)	45 (7)	81 (27)
Mean maximum °F (°C)	37.3 (2.9)	36.3 (2.4)	40.1 (4.5)	48.7 (9.3)	65.2 (18.4)	72.4 (22.4)	73.9 (23.3)	68.6 (20.3)	59.3 (15.2)	48.8 (9.3)	37.3 (2.9)	35.5 (1.9)	76.8 (24.9)
Mean daily maximum °F (°C)	23.4 (−4.8)	24.0 (−4.4)	29.2 (−1.6)	39.4 (4.1)	50.1 (10.1)	55.1 (12.8)	57.0 (13.9)	54.6 (12.6)	48.1 (8.9)	38.7 (3.7)	27.2 (−2.7)	23.7 (−4.6)	39.2 (4.0)
Daily mean °F (°C)	19.3 (−7.1)	20.0 (−6.7)	24.8 (−4.0)	34.6 (1.4)	44.0 (6.7)	49.1 (9.5)	52.1 (11.2)	50.7 (10.4)	44.6 (7.0)	35.9 (2.2)	24.1 (−4.4)	20.2 (−6.6)	34.9 (1.6)
Mean daily minimum °F (°C)	15.2 (−9.3)	15.9 (−8.9)	20.4 (−6.4)	29.8 (−1.2)	37.9 (3.3)	43.1 (6.2)	47.1 (8.4)	46.7 (8.2)	41.2 (5.1)	33.1 (0.6)	21.1 (−6.1)	16.7 (−8.5)	30.7 (−0.7)
Mean minimum °F (°C)	−10.3 (−23.5)	−4.4 (−20.2)	2.9 (−16.2)	18.2 (−7.7)	32.0 (0.0)	37.3 (2.9)	42.4 (5.8)	41.7 (5.4)	34.3 (1.3)	24.3 (−4.3)	4.1 (−15.5)	−1.5 (−18.6)	−15.6 (−26.4)
Record low °F (°C)	−27 (−33)	−22 (−30)	−13 (−25)	4 (−16)	29 (−2)	35 (2)	38 (3)	37 (3)	32 (0)	13 (−11)	−9 (−23)	−17 (−27)	−27 (−33)
Average precipitation inches (mm)	4.55 (116)	3.57 (91)	3.13 (80)	2.09 (53)	1.95 (50)	1.90 (48)	2.65 (67)	4.09 (104)	6.12 (155)	6.10 (155)	5.26 (134)	5.38 (137)	46.79 (1,190)
Source 1: XMACIS2
Source 2: NOAA (precipitation)
