= Dyea, Alaska =

Dyea
- Ghost town
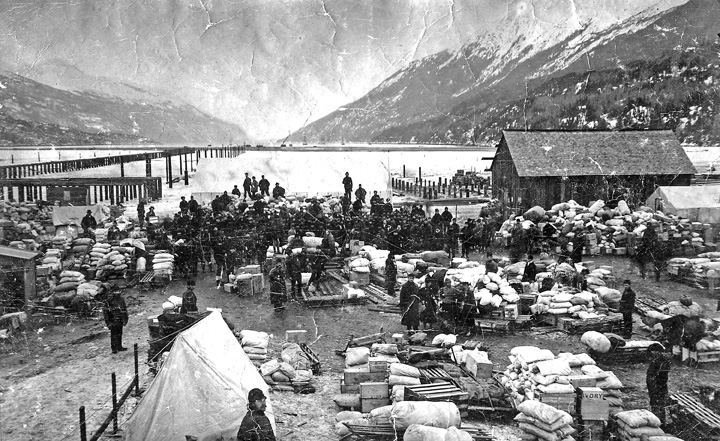
- The Dyea waterfront during the Klondike Gold Rush.

- Location within the state of Alaska
- Coordinates: 59°30′16″N 135°21′36″W
- Country: United States
- State: Alaska

Dyea (/daɪˈiː/ dye-EE) is a ghost town in the U.S. state of Alaska. It lies at the point where the Taiya River empties into the Taiya Inlet (the northernmost reach of the Lynn Canal), three miles northwest of Skagway. The Chilkoot Trail begins here. A few people still live on individual homesteads in the surrounding valley; however, the town itself has largely vanished.

== Etymology ==
The names Dyea and Taiya both derive from a Tlingit word meaning "packing or carrying place". The name reflects Dyea's situation at the beginning of the Chilkoot Trail, which was historically used by the coastal Tlingit to bring trade goods into the interior.

== History ==
Use of the name Dyea for its present location first occurred in 1886, when John J. Healy (1840–1908) and Edgar Wilson (1842–1895) opened their trading post there. Previously, only a small hunting and fishing cabin had existed at the location.

During the Klondike Gold Rush, prospectors disembarked at its port and used the Chilkoot Trail, a Tlingit trade route over the Coast Mountains, to begin their journey to the gold fields around Dawson City, Yukon, about 800 km (500 mi) away. Confidence man and crime boss Soapy Smith, famous for his underworld control of the town of Skagway in 1897–1898 may have had control of Dyea as well.

The port at Dyea had shallow water, and neighboring Skagway had deep water. Dyea was abandoned when the White Pass and Yukon Route railroad chose the White Pass Trail (instead of the alternative Chilkoot Trail), which began at Skagway, for its route.

Chilkoot Trail and Dyea Site is a U.S. National Historic Landmark.

Dyea is now within the Klondike Gold Rush National Historical Park. All that remains is a number of foundations surrounded by scraps of lumber and metal, three cemeteries, including one where almost every person buried died on the same date in 1898 in an avalanche on the gold rush trail, and the ruins of the wharf. Visitors can usually spot brown bears, black bears, and eagles. Brown bears tend to use the Dyea inlets to feed during salmon spawning season (July–August).

== Demographics ==
Historical population
Census	Pop.	Note	%±
1900	261		—
U.S. Decennial Census

Dyea appeared one time on the U.S. Census in 1900 as an unincorporated village. It has since been annexed into the city of Skagway.

== Gallery ==
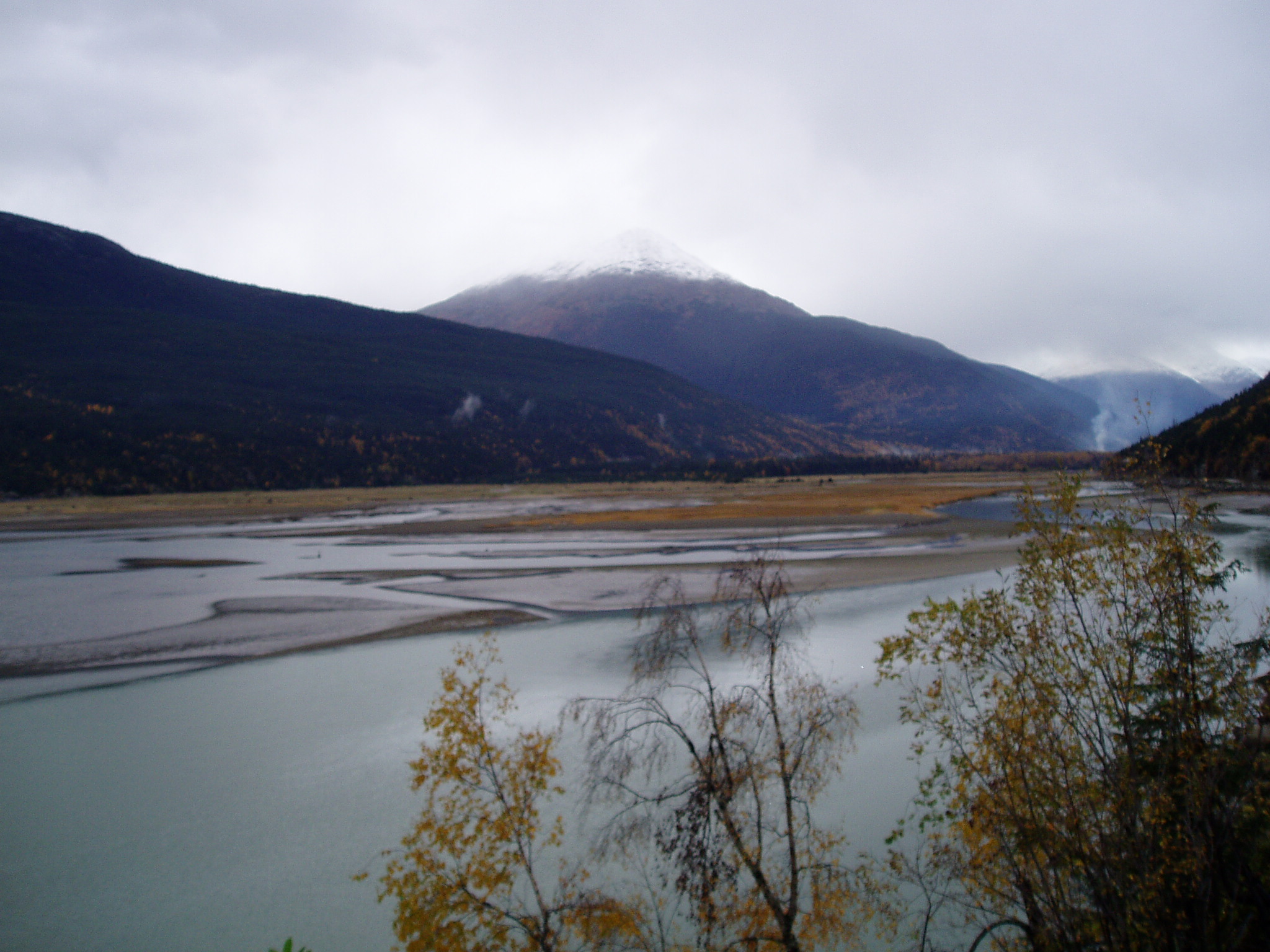
Taiya River estuary and site of Dyea at the beginning of the Chilkoot Trail (October 2005).

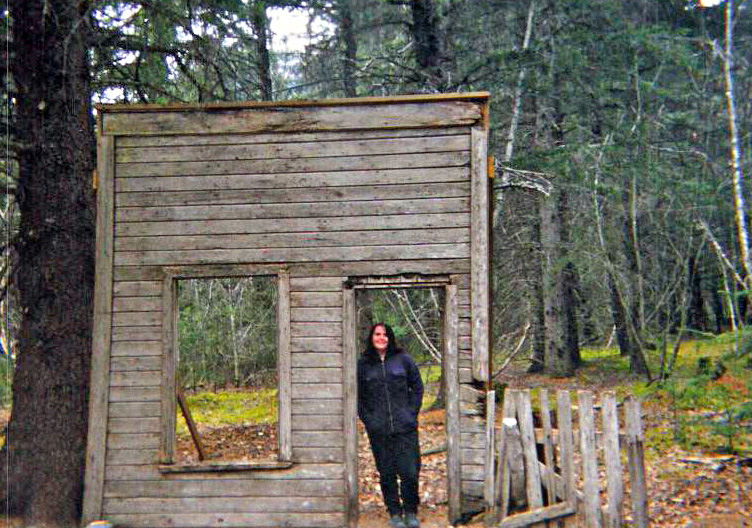
This one wall and section of fence is all that remains of the buildings of old Dyea today.

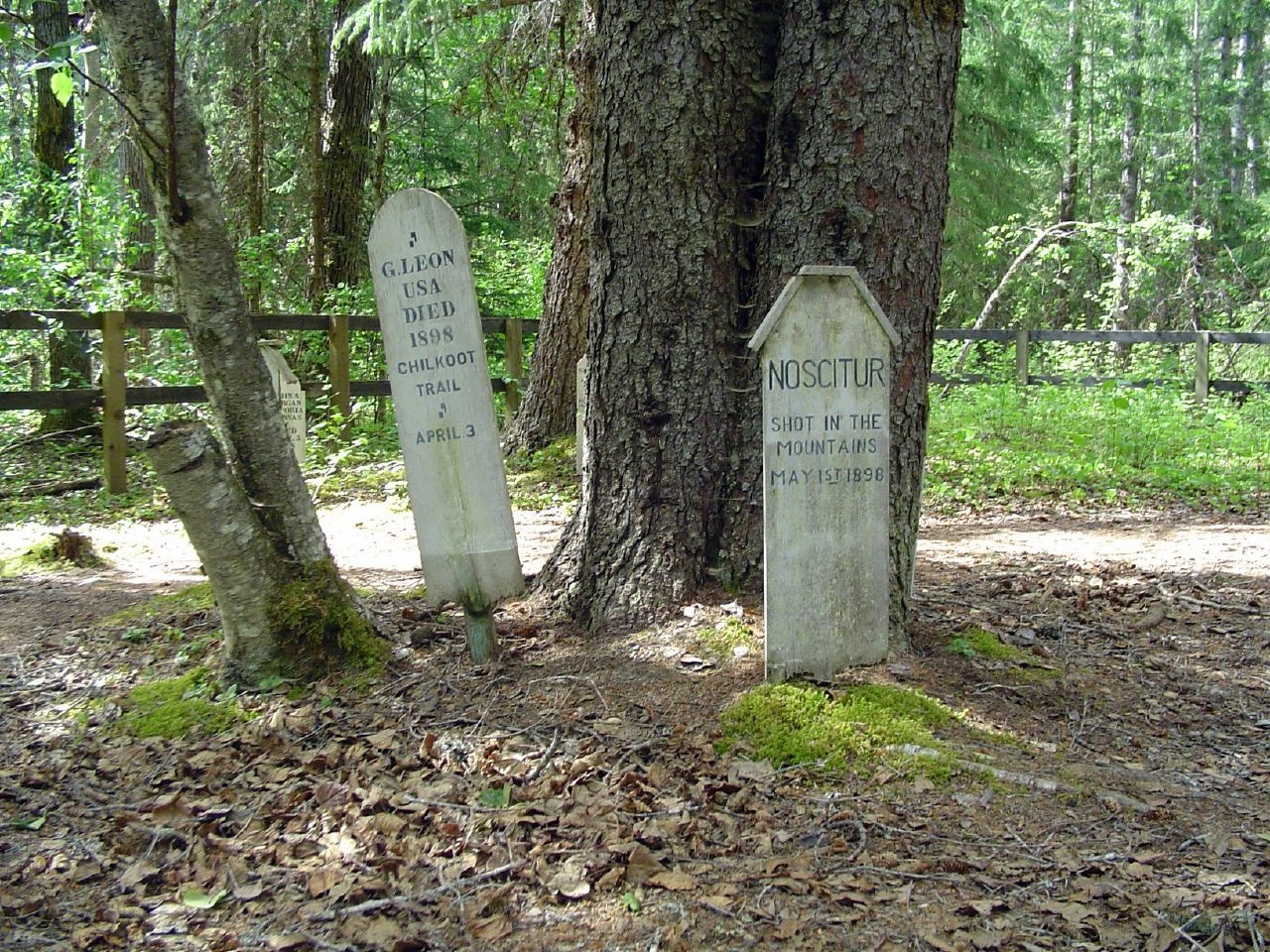
The graveyard containing victims of the 1898 avalanche.
