= The Days of '98 Show =

Klondike Gold Rush–themed musical theater show in Skagway, Alaska

- Logo
- Genre: Klondike Gold Rush
- Show type: resident
- Location: Eagles Hall, Skagway, Alaska
- Official website

The Days of '98 Show (Note: The show has also been called Skaguay in the Days of '98, Skaguay in the Days of '98 with Soapy Smith, Skagway in the Days of '98, and The Days of '98 with Soapy Smith.) is a Klondike Gold Rush–themed musical theater show performed in Eagles Hall in Skagway, Alaska. It is the longest-running Alaskan theatrical show. Created in the 1920s, the show was put on by the Skagway chapter of the Fraternal Order of Eagles and performed infrequently in the 1930s. By the mid-20th century, the show was performed frequently in the summer, particularly on days when cruise ships and passenger ships docked. It was staffed by unpaid locals and used to fundraise for various causes including a local hockey team, an elderly care facility, and Christmas toys for all Skagway children.

Right after World War II, The Days of '98 Show began being presented with a format that would be used into the 1970s. It featured mock gambling, can-can performances, period costumes from the Klondike Gold Rush era, and a recitation and pantomime of the Robert W. Service poem "The Shooting of Dan McGrew". By 1977, the Eagles encountered dwindling membership and financial difficulties with their sole income stream, The Days of '98 Show, not making a profit that year. They inducted new members into the organization including people who were performing in the play Soapy Lives about the conman Soapy Smith. The two shows merged in 1978 after the members rewrote the script, combining elements from both shows. The revised Days of '98 Show depicts various events from Skagway's frontier history. It portrays Smith and his gang's hold on Skagway and ends with the shootout on Juneau Wharf between Smith and vigilante Frank H. Reid. The show received positive reviews for being an engaging production that teaches about Skagway's history.

== Eagles Hall ==
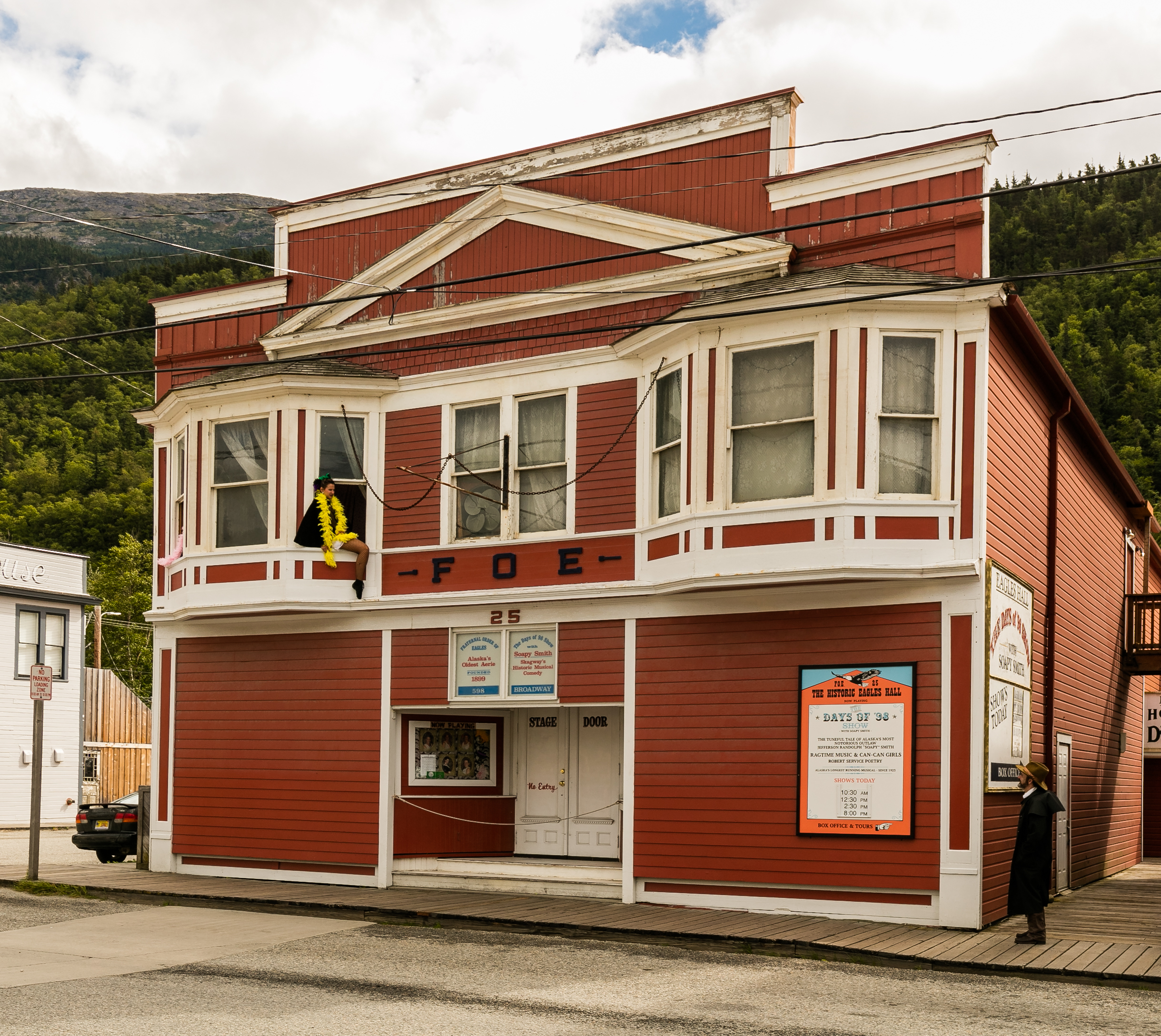
The Eagles Hall in 2017 featuring a costumed performer sticking her leg out the windowsill. She is attempting to attract passersby to watch the show.

The Days of '98 Show is put on by the Skagway Aerie No. 25, Fraternal Order of Eagles and Gold Rush Productions. Established in June 1899, the Order purchased the Eagles Hall, where the show is performed. The Eagles Hall's predecessor was two hotels established in 1898: the Mondamin Hotel on Fifth Avenue close to Main and the Pacific Hotel on Sixth and Broadway. The Order acquired the Pacific Hotel in 1902. After the Pacific Hotel was partially relocated in 1920 to the Mondamin Hotel's posterior, the Eagles bought the building, refurbishing it into a hall and theater. Audrey Prest of the Daily News of Los Angeles in 1989 found Eagles Hall to be reminiscent of a red barn.

Since the hall did not have a stage in 1979, the show was performed on the ground. In 1984, the lobby was furnished with gambling tables, while the theater had "rough hewn walls". The building has offices and a theater with velvet curtains. The ambiance in the theater resembles a saloon during the gold rush. Citing the creeky stairs and the "smells of decades of popcorn butter and a hint of whiskey", Mike Swasey of KHNS said that the theater "smells, sounds, and feels like a classic theatre". The Skagway News's Marc Bona said in 2023 that the aroma of aged wood and freshly made popcorn permeates the structure. To attract people to watch the show, costumed women sing as they balance on the windowsill of the second floor.

== History ==
=== Early history ===
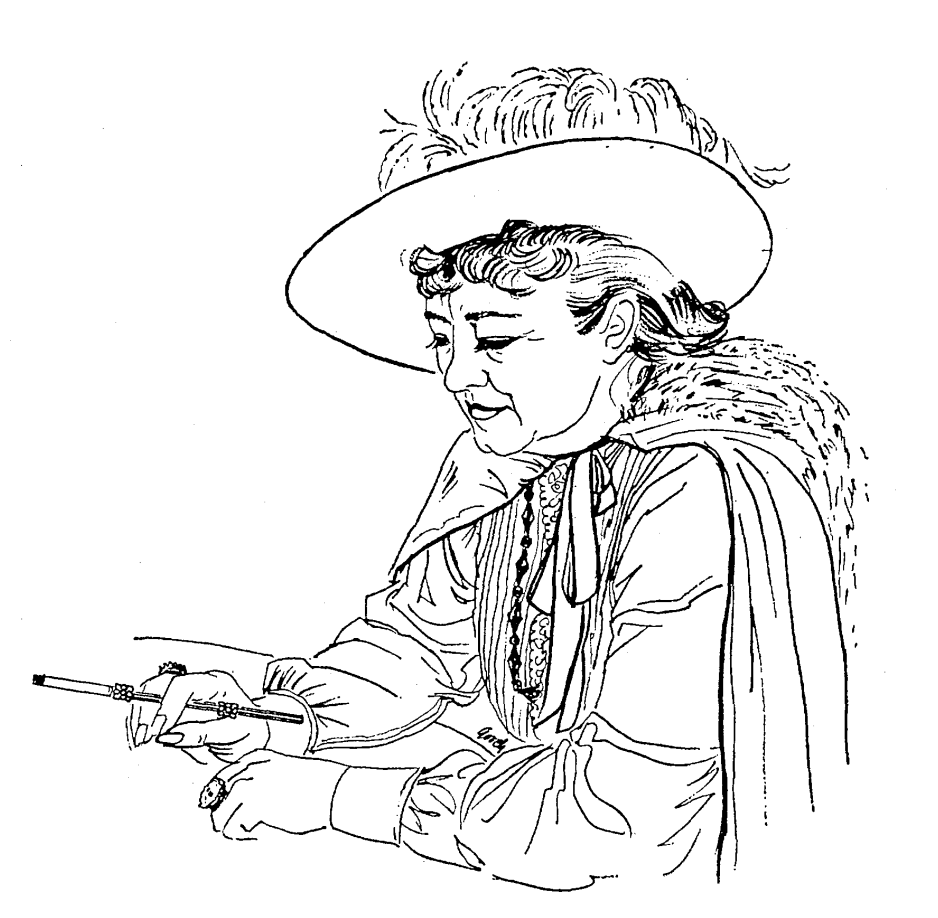
A 1963 drawing of Pauline Pribbenaw as Rough House Rosie. She sings about the bird in the gilded cage.

The Days of '98 Show is a rowdy vaudevillian melodrama, musical revue, comedy, extravaganza, and historical play. (Note: For the show's being rowdy; For the show's being a melodrama; For the show's being vaudevillian; For the show's being a musical; For the show being a revue; For the show's being a comedy; For the show's being an extravaganza; For the show's being a historical play) Sources have given different years for when the show began being performed: 1923, 1925, 1926, 1927, or 1932. (Note: Sources have given different years for when the show began being performed: For 1923; For 1926; For 1927; For 1932) Festive gatherings in honor of the 1898 gold rush were held intermittently in the 1930s. In its early years, the show would be performed a handful of occasions each summer. Soon after World War II, a show was put into place containing mock gambling, dancing, can-can dancers, and "The Shooting of Dan McGrew". Ann True, the show's general manager in 1973, said that upon her arrival in Skagway in 1946, Days of '98 had already been performed like this. The author Robert L. S. Spude said in 1986 that of Alaskan shows, The Days of '98 Show had been performed the longest. The author Catherine Holder said in 2012 that of currently running Alaskan theater shows, The Days of '98 Show had the earliest premiere. Patricia Corrigan of the St. Louis Post-Dispatch said in 1986 the show has been called "the longest running show on Broadway". The initial iteration of the show featured local performers, while the modern shows are done by skilled actors.

Numerous cruise ship excursions include the show as a possible activity. In the mid-20th century, the show was performed in the summer, particularly on days when cruise ships and passenger ships like SS Prince George and SS Princess Louise docked. (Note: For the show being performed in the summer in the mid-20th century; For passenger ships; For SS Prince George and SS Princess Louise; For cruise ships) In 1949, residents put on a "Days of '98 Dance" in which they wore clothes from the Klondike Gold Rush era. Example attire for men included "Christie-stiffs, wide-brimmed miners' hats, moth-eaten toppers [with] string ties and perhaps a scarlet weskit". To depict high-class women, residents wore feathered heats to represent "lady that's known as Lou" (the character from "The Shooting of Dan McGrew") and "Diamond Lil". To depict women who would join men on the Chilkoot Pass, they wore "high-buttoned boots and bustles". The show earned $300 on a regular successful evening in 1949.

The residents of Skagway began putting on the show to fund their hockey group after Princess steamships began making stops in the city. In 1956, the show's proceeds were put towards paying the orchestra and compensating performers' babysitters and the remaining amount went towards the elderly care facility in Sitka, Alaska. Funds earned from the show were used around 1963 were for causes including cancer charity and Christmas toys for children. Funds in 1965 went to the Vancouver Sailors' Home and the Vancouver Crippled Children's Association. Profits from the show in 1971 went to purchasing Christmas presents for the children.

A 1964 newspaper article said the show required no fewer than 20 individuals to host each performance and none of them received compensation. In 1965, Days of '98 was performed between April and the beginning of October. The 1967 cast of more than 50 people put on more than 60 shows. Performed three to four times weekly, the Days of '98 Show in 1971 had two casts that took turns appearing in the production every other week. A subset of the cast had to appear in all shows since there were insufficient people to fill up both casts. There were 90 planned performances in 1973.

=== Merger of Days of '98 Show and Soapy Lives ===
Tom Biss, an actor, moved in 1973 from Anchorage, Alaska, to Skagway. He performed that summer in a one-person play, Soap Pitch (later called Soapy Lives) in a log cabin. The venue was in Skagway's American Legion Hall on Seventh and Broadway. In the winter that year, Biss performed the show in Juneau and Ketchikan. He returned to Skagway in 1974 to perform a more elaborate show in the Arctic Brotherhood lodge hall involving more actors. He established the company Soap Theatrical Co. for putting on the play. Judy Irving, the venue's spotlight manager, used M. Mike Miller's 1970 book Soapy as the foundation for penning the script of Soapy Lives for Biss. Written from the first-person of the frontier gangster Soapy Smith, Soapy offers a positive spin on his life in which he reflects on his youthful mishaps. Having worked as an Alaska Sportsman journalist, Miller likely relied on the magazine's 1950s and 1960s articles as research content for his book. Al Swingle wrote music for the play. The Arctic Brotherhood set was constructed using wood from a Dyea beach.

The show starts with two members of Smith's gang, played by Jim Richards and Steve Hites. As they consume alcohol, the duo sing several songs as they nostalgically recall their interactions with Smith. Hites plays the piano and the guitar while Richards plays the guitar and the banjo. A woman, a dance hall performer, appears in the play. Coming out of his saloon, Biss's Soapy Smith introduces himself to the viewers. He describes how he swindled people in Skagway and became the town's ruler. Bemoaning the vigilante "Committee of 101" that seeks his removal, he criticizes his associates for their foolish avarice in stealing from a man. He is resolute in thwarting Frank Reid, who wants to overthrow him. The show reaches its climax when Smith dies during the shootout on Juneau Wharf with Reid.

While performing in his own show at night, Biss acted as Soapy Smith in the Days of '98 Show in the day and participated in its "The Shooting of Dan McGrew" performance. The show brought on a narrator and a pianist before Jim Richards purchased it from Biss in 1975. In Soapy Lives, Richards had played a Soapy Smith gang member who was a banjo player and later started playing Soapy Smith. In June 1977, Tyler Eccles played "Slim Jim" Foster, a member of Smith's gang. That year, Soapy Lives had been staged about 450 times. At the time, Eagles Hall had a community production called the Days of '98 Show that was performed in the late evenings. To avoid a head-to-head clash, Soapy Lives scheduled shows during the daytime hours, catering to cruise ships.

The Days of '98 Show relied on a volunteer cast and scheduled 62 performances in the summer of 1977. That year, the Eagles introduced additional songs. The production was performed in 1977 every time SS Princess Patricia and MS Prinsendam were in port and a number of the times Monarch Star docked. Both Soapy Lives and the Days of '98 Show had trouble financially supporting the performers. Around 40,000 cruise ship passengers had docked in Skagway in 1975, a small number that could barely sustain Soapy Lives performers Richards, a musician, and an actress. Eagles Hall encountered financial problems in 1977 after its sole income stream, Days of '98 Show, had failed to turn a profit that year. With few members left in the organization, they could not cover the property tax or the membership fees. Their inability to pay the oil bill led to the freezing of their pipes. Eagles Hall had six members left when, realizing they needed a change, members George Flemming and J. D. True suggested adding six young performers to the club's membership rolls. Their aim was to prevent the Grand Aerie from taking over the property and to continue putting on showings of the Days of '98 Show. The six members were inducted as Eagles members during a rite performed on a table in Flemming's kitchen. The new members included Jim Richards and Steve Hites. The initiation of these new members later led to a merger of the Days of '98 Show and the play Soapy Lives.

The process to revise the format and script of the Days of '98 Show began in December 1977. Jim Richards and Steve Hites were housemates. After spending hours fighting a house fire that month, Steve Hites returned to his own house and started sleeping in a chair without getting changed. According to Hites, Richards roused him from sleep and urged him to take notes as Richards outlined a new Days of '98 Show. Richards suggested combining elements of the Soapy Lives show and the Days of 98 show. The show would feature new songs. It would have William Moore narrate about finding the White Pass. It would feature the Days of 98 Show's can-can performers and discuss Skagway's history including Soapy Smith's death. Hites delivered the notes to Tom Healy, who refined the dialogue and acts. Richards, Hites, and Healy jointly came up with a revised script. Hites wrote some of the new show's music, while Richards wrote two songs: "The Boomtown Saloon" and "Moonlight, the Yukon and You".

Richards and Dorothy Shaplin founded the company Gold Rush Productions to put on the revised production in collaboration with the previous show's producer, the Fraternal Order of Eagles. Run by volunteers, the show's previous version was performed three to four times a week for three decades and depleted the pool of people willing to contribute their efforts without compensation. The new show's cast received compensation. Hites, the director of the revised show, said in 2009 that 26 people made up the cast of the revamped show, while Barbara Kalen of Whitehorse Daily Star said in 1978 that the show featured a cast of 14 to 15 people. Kalen wrote that a number of people longed for the show's prior version. She concluded that the majority found "this new authentic historical sketch is really much better, and has wider audience appeal".

In both Days of '98 Show and Soapy Lives, the audiences are startled by the loud noises of blanks being fired in the confined space of the theater during the shootout between Smith and Reid. According to Hites, the two versions portray the circumstances of Smith's differently. In Soapy Lives, under muted red lighting, Smith and Reid meet and shout lines sourced from the event's eyewitnesses. Using black powder blanks, they exchange gunfire, causing flashes to appear. It is clear that Reid killed Smith. In contrast, in the revised Days of '98 Show, Smith exits from the audience's view after readying his Winchester rifle and shouting "They can't take this town from me! I run this town!" The narrator discusses how Smith is traveling to the Juneau Company Wharf, where the vigilantes will confront him. The narrator says "A man like Reid did his deed", a blank is shot out of view of the audience, and the narrator concludes, "And sent poor Soapy home." Hites said the aim is to allow viewers to hint that Reid was responsible for pulling the trigger on Smith but to also allow viewers to decide what happened.

in 1978, Jim Richards played the role of the protagonist, Soapy Smith, in the Days of '98 and continued performing three days a week in Soapy Lives. Over a period of 33 years, he made over 10,000 appearances as Soapy Smith. After experiencing a stroke in the middle of show on August 28, 2009, he performed his last show that year on September 17.

=== Soapy Smith's wake ===
Beginning in 1974, Soapy Smith's descendants and the show's actors attended an annual wake for Smith on July 8, the anniversary of his death. The first wake was held at Smith's grave at the Gold Rush Cemetery. The revelers brought champagne to toast Smith. Since the cemetery did not have lavatories, they urinated on the grave of Frank H. Reid, a guard who had died in a shootout with Smith. In the 1980s, after doing the final performance of the day, the actors visited Smith's grave on his death anniversary. During the celebration, Smith's grandson, who lived in California, brought champagne to share. Jeff Hall, the president of the Soapy Smith Preservation Trust, said the "horrid tradition" of urinating on Reid's grave was a factor in their decision to move the wake from the cemetery to Eagles Hall. Following discussions with Reid's family, Jeff Smith, Soapy Smith's great-grandson, apologized to them three decades after the first wake. Jeff Smith said, "I know how upset I would be were I to find that people were doing to Soapy's grave what we had begun doing to Frank Reid's in 1974."

=== Later history ===
Directed by David Morgan, people from the drama department at Brigham Young University performed for the show in the early 1990s. The show had daytime and nighttime performances in the early 2000s. With a schedule significantly influenced by cruise ships, the show in the 21st century is performed between once and four times a day between the middle of May and the middle of September. The Wall Street Journal said in 2011 that thousands of cruise ship tourists watched the show every summer.

Between circa 2010 and December 2019, Jonathan Baldwin and Jonathan Hays owned Gold Rush Productions, which put on the Days of '98 Show. Charity Pomeroy and Meredith Schmidt acquired Gold Rush Productions in December 2019 and became its joint artistic directors. Pomeroy had moved to Skagway in 2001 to be a performer in the show. The next season, zero cruise ships docked in Skagway in 2020 owing to the COVID-19 pandemic in Alaska. The following year, the estimated number of summer cruise ship visitors was below 10% of previous seasons, so the two owners sought to minimize costs as they put on the performance. Pomeroy took on the role of Belle Davenport, while Schmidt performed as Squirrel Tooth Alice. Soapy Smith was portrayed by the proprietor of a nearby lodge, whom they paid to take on the role. They employed a Pennsylvania-based piano player and several lighting technicians. The Days of '98 Show performed 33 summer shows in 2021, far below the approximately 400 shows they would previously do. During the pandemic, COVID-19 relief funds from the federal government ensured the business remained afloat. Pomeroy rents an office in the hall where she fixes costumes.

== Show ==
=== Background ===
Skagway had over 20,000 inhabitants in 1898 when Klondike Gold Rush prospectors swarmed the town and Dyea which they used as their launching pad to journey through Chilkoot Trail and White Pass Trail to the Klondike territory of Yukon. An 1898 report from the North-West Mounted Police called Skagway "little better than a hell on earth". Mounties maintained control in Canada, while Skagway was a free-for-all. The conman Soapy Smith and his associates controlled the town. His rule ended after a shootout on Juneau Wharf involving the vigilante Frank H. Reid left the two men dead. By 1979, Skagway's population reached around 800, down from the over 20,000 in 1898.

=== Pre-show activities ===
The Days of 98 Show had several pre-show activities in 1956. Visitors purchased $1 to receive $100 in fake money for an hour of mock gambling. They could play blackjack or visit two roulette tables and two dice tables. At the conclusion of the gambling, a prize was given to the person with the largest sum of money. The prize was an Eskimo carving made of ivory in a 1956 show. For a 1971 show, the prize was a small-scale model of the "Prospector" statue positioned outside the Sitka Pioneer Home. Young women from the cast strode through the venue, attempting to get the men in the audience to join them in dancing. When guests went to the dance floor, a marshal squeezed them, making them pay $1 to post bail for dancing with dishonorable characters. The kangaroo court would give the guests a card saying they were apprehended for dancing with Klondike Kate, Diamond-Tooth Lil, or the Oregon Mare. Vigilantes would fetch people who opted not to dance alongside the show's cast and bring them to a kangaroo court, which would impose a $1.00 penalty. An auctioneer peddled Lady Lou's garter.

The pre-show activities of the revamped 1978 show resembled those of the prior version. The show's 21st-century iteration continued to have several pre-show activities. For an hour before the show, ragtime music is played and there is "mock gambling" with "Soapy's money". The writer M. Mike Miller said the gambling was "strictly-for-fun" and children could participate. The show's actors serve as dealers at the casino. A number of the card tables are from the gold rush era. The gambling victor in the 1978 and in the 1980s received the prize of being able to take off a dancer's garter. In a 1982 show, an auctioneers sold the garter of "a well-endowed redhead sprawled on the bar" to the person willing to pay the most. He took her garter, and she asked him to visit her room situated on top of the bar. He also received a small part in the play. The show commemorates Robert W. Service in a segment called "The Vagabond of Verse". His poetry is recited 30 minutes before the show starts. Through his humorous poetry, Service chronicled the later years of the gold rush.

=== Main show ===
==== Post-World War II version ====
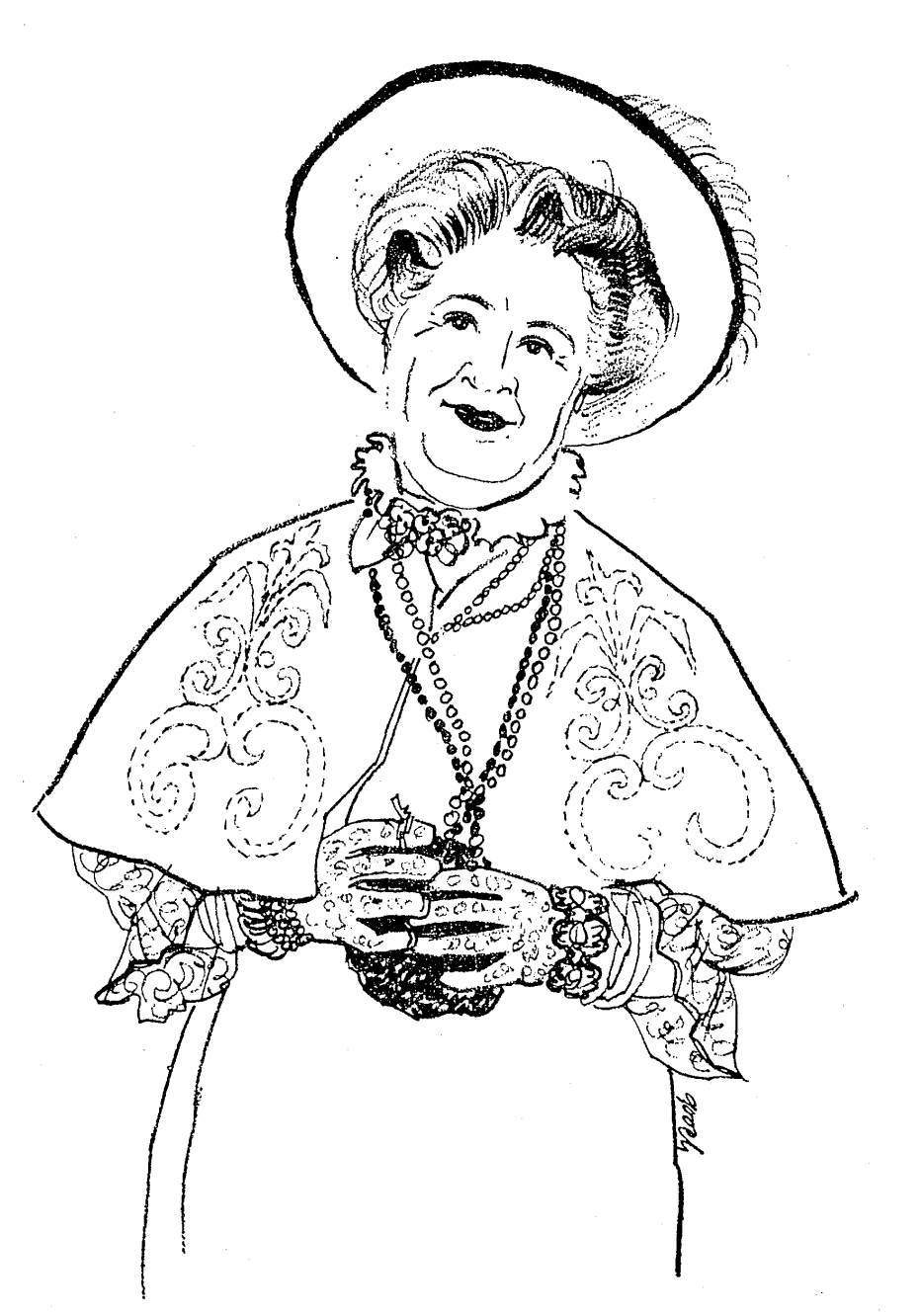
A 1963 drawing of Felicia Braun, who plays Queenie, the monologist. She dances with a number of make-believe men.

Right after World War II, a show with a format that would be used into the 1970s was put into place. The show had seven acts in 1963. It featured can-can performances: one lineup had high school students and another had married women. Locals wore period costumes from the Klondike Gold Rush era. Songs from the '98 era were performed and danced to. The show begins with Rough House Rosie appearing on stage. She is clad in furs adorned with violet-hued feathers and an ostrich-feathered hat and sings:

'Tis sad when you think of
her wast-ed life
For youth cannot mate with age
and her beauty was so-o-ld
For an old man's go-o-ld—
She's a bur-herd in a gilded ca-age.

Played by a matriarch from the town, the singer shrieks in the raucous environment, and from time to time shows her red flannel panties by lifting her skirt. A woman sings "Bill Bailey" and "Ain't She Sweet". The musicians include a pianist, two saxophonists, and two drummers. Backed by a pianist, another woman sings a tune about the difficulty in finding a quality man. The show's monologist, Queenie, dances with a number of make-believe men including one who dances with his eyes shut, causing her foot to end up in a spittoon. Clad in a red vest, H.D. Kirmse tells historical anecdotes about Alaska such as his jeweler father's 1898 creation of a huge nugget chain for Pat Renwick, a gambler who used the chain as collateral. Performing songs he wrote in both English and Tlingit, Richard Dick, a Klukwan man from the Eagle Tlingit clan, sings in a deep Tlingit accent while playing the guitar. Several people sing the state song "Alaska's Flag".

The show ends with a performer reading the Robert W. Service poem "The Shooting of Dan McGrew" and performers pantomiming it. McGrew drinks a ginger ale as miners assemble at a table and his girlfriend, Lou, watch him. The narrator recites from the poem, "In stumbled a miner fresh from the creeks, dog-dirty and loaded for bear." At this time, a man dressed in fur enters and plays the Johannes Brahms tune "Cradle Song" at the piano. The narrator says, "My God, but that man could play!" Dangerous Dan McGrew and the Stranger have a shootout as the room plunges into darkness. Lou weeps over her boyfriend's lifeless body and takes the gold dust.

==== Post-1978 version ====
A video of two scenes from The Days of '98 Show in 2019. The first scene has can-can dancing. The second scene features Soapy Smith and Belle Davenport singing the song "Moonlight, the Yukon, and You".

The Days of '98 Show underwent a rewrite in 1978 and is about the Klondike gold rush and other events from Skagway history. It has six acts and a one-hour runtime. The show has audience participation in which some people near the stage are included in the performance. Banjo and piano players perform ragtime, while dance hall performers dance the can-can. The show features can-can performers named Molly Fewclothes, Belle Davenport, and Squirrel Tooth Alice. It has humorous patter and songs from the era.

The show's starring characters include William Moore, the steamship captain who was Skagway's first settler; the con man Soapy Smith; Reverend Bowers, a member of Smith's gang; and J.D. Stewart, the Stampeder (a gold rush prospector). Steamship captain Moore begins the production by sharing his visions of the impending gold rush and the swarm of Stampeders that would descend upon the area. A separate scene depicts how Vernie Woodward brought back to life her partner, who had been trapped in the Chilkoot Trail's April 3, 1898, avalanche. In a humorous skit, a horse gradually crumples under the load of the items stacked on the animal. The sketch illustrates how thousands of overburdened horses had died on the trail. The railroad contractor Michael James Heney and the London financier Thomas Tancrede talk about the potential for building a railroad. Heney pronounces, "If you give me enough dynamite and snoose, I'll build you a railroad to Hell." Heney constructs the railroad White Pass and Yukon Route leading from Skagway to Whitehorse.

It depicts the chaos caused in Skagway between 1897 and 1898 by main character Soapy Smith, who portrays himself as honorable person. During the gold rush, Smith swindles prospectors who stop at Skagway as they journey to Yukon Territory in pursuit of gold. Four days before city surveyor Frank H. Reid kills him, Smith is at the head of an Independence Day parade in 1898 with John Green Brady, the governor of the District of Alaska. Several days after the parade, J.D. Stewart, the Stampeder, brings back gold worth $2,400 ($92,880 in 2025). In Clancy's Saloon, Smith associate Reverend Bowers robs Stewart of the gold, triggering the shootout on Juneau Wharf that killed Smith and Reid. The shootings unfold out of view of the audience with a blank going off. The deafening gunshot in the enclosed theater startles the audience. The production ends with every cast member singing the state song "Alaska's Flag".

== Notable performers ==
- Michael Baish made his initial trip in 1985 to Skagway to be director of the Days of '98 Show. During the summer, he visited Skagway, where he presented the poems of Robert W. Service for the show.
- William Jefferson Brady in 1982 played the character J.D. Stewart, the gold prospector whom Soapy Smith and his associates rob in the Days of '98 Show. He also participated in pre-show activities including as a casino dealer for the mock gambling as well as an auctioneer who sells a garter to the top bidder. Brady founded The Skagway News in 1978.
- Richard Dick began participating in the show around 1958. Born in Angoon, he was a Klukwan man from the Eagle Tlingit clan. While playing the electric guitar, he performed songs he wrote in both English and Tlingit in a deep Tlingit accent. Alta Barger, a resident of Fort Worth, Texas, visited Skagway in 1967 and watched Dick at the Days of '98 Show. The two married in Skagway on January 19, 1968.
- Buckwheat Donahue tried out to be a Frank H. Reid understudy. He was selected to play Reid. During casting, he paused on reaching commas, something that other auditioners could not do. According to Donahue, the director chose him for that capability since directing him would be the most effortless. He undertook additional parts in the production and took on the position of president for the Skagway Fraternal Order of Eagles.

== Reception ==
=== Post-World War II version ===
Lyn Harrington of the Vancouver Sun said in 1949, "It isn't high art, perhaps, but it is an escape into a different world for travellers." Writing for Michigan Quarterly Review, the academic Dow V. Baxter in 1963 praised Pauline Pribbenaw's performance as Rough House Rosie, saying she "puts some awesome pathos into her number when she reaches for an emphatic crescendo". Mrs. Harlow Kline of the Statesville Record & Landmark praised the show in 1958 for providing "fun and laughter for all" and cited the dancing, music, mock gambling, and "The Shooting of Dan McGrew" performance. Dunc Holmes of the Vancouver Sun said in 1965, "The whole show is amateurish, but charming, and invariably gets a standing ovation", while the National Post's Kit Morgan found the show "amateurish but fun" in 1970.

=== Post-1978 version ===
The Kerrville Mountain Sun's Marjorie Peters in 1979 found the production to be "an enjoyable evening [that] gave us an insight into Skagway's bawdy, notorious past". Referring to Canadian shows put on in Whitehorse and Dawson City, Jean Koenig of the Edmonton Journal found in 1979 that the show was unable to replicate the Follies performances' sparkle and flair but was at least as expensive if not more so than those shows. But she concluded "it's a fun evening for visitors and does illustrate the community spirit of a town that has survived, and today lives by tourism and the railway". The Dallas Morning News's Donnis Baggett in 1984 called the show "a good local theatrical production" that gives the audience "a colorful look at the town's rambunctious past".

The authors Ed and Lynn Readicker-Henderson praised The Days of '98 Show for providing a "good, entertaining history of Skagway" that featured Soapy Smith and Frank Reid's altercation. Rough Guides called it "an entertaining, if somewhat cheesy, historical musical". Audrey Prest of the Daily News of Los Angeles lauded the show for giving viewers a sense of "the rough-and-tumble frontier era from the high-energy cast of swaggering scoundrels and petticoated dance-hall girls" and "an entertaining way to get your history lesson". The Atlanta Journal-Constitution's Colin Bessonette deemed the show to have "noisy overacting and slapstick routines" and would not work on Broadway but called it "perfect here in small-town Alaska". The San Diego Union-Tribune travel writer Dan Gindling considered the production "thoroughly delightful", citing the mock gambling before the show, the women dancers, and the shootouts.

== Bibliography ==
- Aarons, Felice; Johansen, Heidi, eds. (2007). Alaska Ports of Call 2007. New York: Fodor's. p. 198. ISBN 978-1-4000-1720-1. ISSN 1520-0205 – via Google Books.
- Baxter, Dow V. (Spring 1963). "A Toast to Skagway". Michigan Quarterly Review. Vol. 2, no. 2. pp. 120–121. hdl:2027/spo.act2080.0002.002:10.
- Ballas, Teeka; Besl, J.; Cannamore, David; Fletcher, Amy; Smith, Dawnell (2022). Sadlowski, Amanda (ed.). Fodor's Alaska (35 ed.). New York: Fodor's. ISBN 978-1-64097-475-3. ISSN 2325-2049 – via Google Books.
- Bellinger, Brookelyn (2010). The Frozen Toe Guide to Real Alaskan Livin': Learn How to Survive Moose Attacks, Endless Winters & Life Without Indoor Plumbing. Seattle: Sasquatch Books. ISBN 978-1-57061-720-1 – via Google Books.
- Cantor, George (2020) [1999]. Bad Guys in American History. Lanham, Maryland: Lyons Press. p. 208. ISBN 978-1-49305-022-2 – via Google Books.
- Chandonnet, Ann (2006). Paull, Jennifer (ed.). Alaska's Inside Passage. New York: Fodor's. p. 120. ISBN 978-1-4000-1480-4 – via Google Books.
- Cook, Samantha; Perry, Tim; Ward, Greg (2004). The Rough Guide to USA (7 ed.). New York: Rough Guides. p. 1314. ISBN 1-84353-262-X – via Google Books.
- Devine, Bob (2009) [2006]. Alaska. Washington, D.C.: National Geographic Traveler. p. 262. ISBN 978-1-4262-0386-2 – via Google Books.
- Evans, Polly (2010). Yukon. Chalfont St Peter, Bucks: Bradt Travel Guides. p. 125. ISBN 978-1-84162-310-8 – via Google Books.
- Ludmer, Larry H. (2001). Cruising Alaska: A Traveler's Guide to Cruising Alaskan Waters & Discovering the Interior (5 ed.). Edison, New Jersey: Hunter Publishing. p. 116. ISBN 1-58843-115-0 – via Google Books.
- Fowler, Carol (2009). Explorer's Guide Alaska Panhandle: A Great Destination (Explorer's Great Destinations). Woodstock, Vermont: The Countryman Press. p. 112. ISBN 978-1-58157-095-3 – via Google Books.
- Golden, Fran Wenograd; Brown, Jerry (2005). Cruise Vacations For Dummies 2005. Hoboken, New Jersey: Wiley. p. 358. ISBN 0-7645-6941-4 – via Google Books.
- Gottberg, John (1988). Frommer's Dollarwise Guide to Alaska. 1988–89 edition. New York: Prentice Hall Press. pp. 134, 136, 143. ISBN 0-671-62416-4 – via Internet Archive.
- Insight Guides Alaska. London: Insight Guides. 2021. ISBN 978-1-83905-302-3 – via Google Books.
- Jiang, Yurun 蔣育荏 (2018). 阿拉斯加 [Alaska] (in Chinese). Taipei: Mook 墨刻. p. 173. ISBN 978-9-86289-421-7 – via Google Books.
- Maloney, Lisa (2020). Moon Alaska: Scenic Drives, National Parks, Best Hikes (2 ed.). Berkeley, California: Avalon Travel. p. 117. ISBN 978-1-64049-814-3 – via Google Books.
- Manning, Robert; Manning, Martha (2023). Walks of a Lifetime from Around the World: Extraordinary Hikes in Exceptional Places. Lanham, Maryland: FalconGuides. p. 46. ISBN 978-1-4930-7237-8 – via Google Books.
- Miller, M. Mike (2008) [1983]. Alaska's Southeast: Touring the Inside Passage (11 ed.). Guilford, Connecticut: Morris Communications. p. 237. ISBN 978-0-7627-4535-7. ISSN 1545-1941 – via Google Books.
- Pitcher, Don (2007) [1983]. Young, Sabrina (ed.). Moon Alaska (9 ed.). Emeryville, California: Moon Publications. p. 162. ISBN 978-1-56691-929-6. ISSN 1547-0261 – via Google Books.
- Readicker-Henderson, Ed; Readicker-Henderson, Lynn (2006). Adventure Guide Inside Passage & Coastal Alaska (5 ed.). Edison, New Jersey: Hunter Publishing. p. 320. ISBN 978-1-58843-515-6 – via Google Books.
- Romano-Lax, Andromeda (1997). Walking Southeast Alaska: Scenic Walks and Easy Hikes for Inside Passage Travelers. Berkeley, California: Wilderness Press. p. 149. ISBN 978-0-89997-208-4 – via Google Books.
- Sainsbury, Brendan (2022). Lonely Planet Alaska (13 ed.). Oakland: Lonely Planet. ISBN 978-1-83758-094-1 – via Google Books.
- Spude, Catherine Holder (2012). "That Fiend in Hell": Soapy Smith in Legend. Norman, Oklahoma: University of Oklahoma Press. pp. 165–167. ISBN 978-0-8061-4280-7 – via Google Books.
- Spude, Robert L. S. (1983). Skagway, District of Alaska, 1884–1912: Building the Gateway to the Klondike. Fairbanks, Alaska: Anthropology and Historic Preservation, Cooperative Park Studies Unit, University of Alaska Fairbanks. p. 158 – via Google Books.
- Whitfield, Paul (2005). The Rough Guide to Alaska. Hoboken, New Jersey: Wiley. p. 188. ISBN 0-7645-6941-4.
- Wohlforth, Charles (2007). Alaska For Dummies (3 ed.). Hoboken, New Jersey: Wiley. p. 349. ISBN 978-0-471-94555-0 – via Google Books.
