= Hungry Joe (disambiguation) =

Hungry Joe may refer to:

- Hungry Joe, (c. 1850-March 22, 1902), an American criminal and swindler
- Hungry Joe, Montana, an unincorporated community in Dawson County
- Hungry Joe, a character in Joseph Heller's novel Catch-22, see List of Catch-22 characters
