= Tom O'Brien (swindler) =

American confidence man and swindler

- Born: Thomas O'Brien c. 1851; Chicago, Illinois, United States
- Died: 29 September 1904 (aged 53); Devil's Island, French Guiana
- Other names: Big Tom O'Brien; Edward O'Brien
- Occupations: Confidence man and swindler
- Known for: Trickster and bunco man active in the United States during the late 19th century; sentenced to Devil's Island for the murder of partner Reed Waddell in 1895.
- Partner(s): Anne Grey, mistress
- Relatives: 1 brother

Tom O'Brien (c. 1851 − September 29, 1904) was an American confidence man and swindler during the late 19th century. He was popularly known as "King of the Bunco Men", along with other prominent tricksters such as Joseph "Hungry Joe" Lewis and Charles P. Miller, and organized countless bunco and confidence schemes throughout the United States, especially in New Orleans, Chicago and New York, as well as in Europe. He often partnered with a number of confidence and banco men such as Lon Ludlam, Red Adams, Frank Smith, Pete Carlisle, Ed Ray, Red Austin, Charley Hinnell, "Hungry Joe" Lewis and Reed Waddell. He later shot and killed Waddell in an argument over money following a scheme they had run in Paris, France.

He, like Waddell, was credited with having invented the "gold brick swindle". A classic con trick, he made at least $500,000 using this swindle during a five-month period at the Columbian Exposition of 1893 as one of many figures of the criminal underworld who attended the event.

== Biography ==
=== Early criminal career ===
A native of Chicago, Illinois, Tom O'Brien first appeared during the early 1880s, becoming notorious for his con games and confidence tricks. This was most evident in such major cities as New Orleans, Chicago and New York City where he based his operations for much of his criminal career. He frequently visited New Orleans throughout his life, both to devise new schemes and to see his mistress Anne Grey. Grey, a highly popular courtesan and madam in the city's underworld, ran a high-class "bagnio" on Burgundy Street and was extensively involved in confidence tricks in New York, Atlanta and Paris before arriving in Louisiana. During O'Brien's trial for Waddell's murder, Grey sold off all her assets so she could join O'Brien in Paris and was able to use her wealth to spare O'Brien from the guillotine.

Former NYPD police detective Thomas F. Byrnes, referred to O'Brien as "King of the Bunco Men" in his book Professional Criminals of America (1886) and claimed he had been arrested "in almost every city of the United States" and had spent at least twenty years in prison during his criminal career. He was perhaps most infamous as a "bunco steerer" and was alleged to have stolen around $500,000 in his criminal dealings. In Harry Houdini's The Right Way to Do Wrong: An Expose of Successful Criminals (1906), one of O'Brien's typical banco swindles was described as a popular variation of the "real Simon Pure Bunco Game":

The victim, some wealthy farmer usually, was lured to a room at a hotel and a game was proposed. A confederate took the part of another player. A pack of forty-eight cards in eight sets, each numbered from one to six was produced, shuffled, and dealt out eight cards to each player. The total sum of the numbers in each hand was then compared with the number carrying a prize on the chart. If it corresponded, the hand won a prize.
The cards are gravely counted and prepared. The dealer then says to the confederate and the dupe, "Gentlemen, you have drawn the grand conditional advertising prize. You're entitled to $10,000 a piece on condition that you prove yourself worth $50,000, and promise to advertise our battery, whether you win or lose. You will have to put up $10,000 against the prize; then you draw once more. If you draw a star number you get only the $10,000 prize and your money back. If you draw any other number you get its prize added to your own money and the big prize."
The confederate says he is worth more than $50,000 and declares his intention of going and getting the $10,000 stake. The dupe is also persuaded to put up the cash, and both winners go away to get the money. They return, and the money is put up. Four cards are dealt each. The total of each hand is twenty-eight. "Why, gentlemen," says the bunco man in apparent surprise, "twenty-eight is the 'State number', the total blank! You have lost all."
The confederate pretends to be very much broken up, commiserates with his "fellow victim", and gets him out of the room as soon as he can. As soon as he can he gives the farmer the slip, joins his partner, and they escape from town as quickly as possible.

O'Brien was able to take a Michigan farmer for $21,000 using this ploy, perhaps his most successful effort, but was eventually arrested for the 1889 theft of $10,000 in bonds from Albany businessman Rufus W. Peck in December 1891. Arrested in England, he was extradited back to the U.S. and, on March 25, 1892, was sentenced to ten years imprisonment in Clinton Prison. He was defended by William F. Howe. Other accounts claim he escaped from custody while being transported to Sing Sing.

=== Escape and years as a fugitive ===
On April 21, 1892, O'Brien escaped from custody in Utica, New York while being escorted by James B. Buck on a writ of habeas corpus. Authorities believed he returned to Chicago via Canada where, in the safety of his hometown, he reportedly had hidden $10,000. While there, he was one of a number of criminals who attended the Columbian Exposition of 1893 where he netted at least $500,000 over a period of five months using the "gold brick swindle". He eventually fled to New Orleans, possibly after a tip to his whereabouts by a South Side Chicago saloon keeper, and then to Paris, where he stayed briefly until an incident with a gendarme nearly caused his capture. He traveled to South America, where he and his partner Doc Minchon were involved in dealing narcotics in Haiti. In March 1894, an anonymous letter was received in Little Falls, New York in which the author, claiming to be a close friend of O'Brien, disclosed the whereabouts of the fugitive. It was reported that O'Brien was serving as a soldier in Haiti, having fought in defense of the government during the insurrection, and that he was considering entering politics given his recent popularity. The alias he was using was not included in the letter.

=== Murder of Reed Waddell ===
O'Brien eventually returned to Paris in late 1894 or early 1895 where he and Reed Waddell, another con man he previously worked with throughout the U.S., became partners in a banco swindle. Once they decided to end their operation however, they began arguing over the division of the spoils. It was later claimed that dispute arose from an argument in which Waddell allegedly refused to loan O'Brien money while on the run. The argument eventually resulted in O'Brien shooting Waddell at the Northern Railway Station in Paris on March 27, 1895. O'Brien was taken into custody shortly after, where he gave his name as "Edward O'Brien" and claimed to be a resident of Cambridge, New York. The New York City Police Department believed otherwise, Detective Sergeant George McClusky publicly stating there was "little doubt that the man under arrest was Tom O'Brien", and American authorities petitioned the French government for his extradition. Waddell died several days later and, despite his claim to police that he had never seen O'Brien before, O'Brien was charged with his murder. His trial, however, was postponed while the U.S. State Department formally requested that the French government return O'Brien to the United States on the grounds of being a fugitive from justice.

=== Imprisonment at Devil's Island ===
He was eventually convicted of murder on March 14, 1896, and although the prosecution called for the mandatory death sentence by guillotine, O'Brien was instead sentenced to life imprisonment in the infamous French penal colony Devil's Island. His defense attorney Maftre Demange had claimed during the trial that the two men had exchanged gunfire, rather than O'Brien having killed Waddell in cold blood, and that gunfights were common in settling disputes in the United States. He also downplayed O'Brien's criminal record, claiming he was "merely a gambling cheat", and that he was in fear of his life and acting in self-defense at the time of the murder. Although there were reports that O'Brien was on his death bed in New Caledonia in December 1898, noted detective William Pinkerton publicly denied these claims and said that he heard from O'Brien through his brother who had received a letter from him two months before. According to the letter, O'Brien wrote that "he was in good health and that his punishment was not severe". He spent another six years on the island until French officials reported his death on September 29, 1904.
