= Ed "Big Ed" Burns =

Edward "Big Ed" Burns (c. 1842 – after 1918} was an American confidence man and crime boss. He was born around 1842 in Buffalo, New York. In 1861, he began a bunco career in Chicago, Illinois. He joined his older brothers. Burns worked as a stonemason for some years. He also became a sailor on Lake Michigan, as second mate on a private yacht. His brother John Burns was first mate.

About 1866, he strangled a man to death and was sentenced to nine years in Joliet, an Illinois prison. After being released in 1875, he returned to Chicago, where he was seriously wounded by a bullet in the back by a man purported to be a friend.

In April 1877, he was reported as the leader of a bunco gang on Chicago's South Side, where he used his gang to influence votes for political candidates. In a fight, Burns was shot in the thigh. He was arrested as ring-leader of buncoing. He was arrested again for vagrancy. He fled Chicago and a $300 bond. Returning in six months, he was arrested on the previous vagrancy charge and for robbery. At trial the charge was dismissed because he could show plenty of money, a profession as a peddler of soap, and a saloon in a building he had rented from a city alderman. Application for a saloon license was denied. He began selling liquor illegally from a boat on Lake Michigan. He managed to escape several police raids by jumping overboard, thus gaining the moniker "Elephantine Edward of the Floating Palace." In October 1878 Burns was extradited to Detroit on several pick-pocketing charges.

Taking his repertoire of con games to the frontier, the commonly known "Big Ed Burns" became boss of a gang in Leadville, Colorado. Fleeing from the vigilantes there, he took his gang on the railroads, hitting the towns from Buena Vista, Colorado, on through Kansas, New Mexico, and finally to Benson, in the Arizona Territory. Headquartered in Benson, Burns and co-leader J. J. Harlan (a.k.a. "The Off Wheeler") worked a triangulation of towns to include Tombstone and Tucson, Arizona Territory. In this region the Burns gang clashed with the Earp brothers on several occasion—Virgil and Wyatt, but especially with Morgan Earp, who arrested various outlaw Cowboys.

After five months, Byrnes took off again and was all over the map for many years, from coast to coast, north to south. While in Denver, Colorado he joined up with the Soapy Smith gang. After the turn of the century, "Big Ed Burns" was still being arrested in many places from Florida, his home turf of Illinois, California and up to Washington State. He was last heard of in 1918, in fear of dying in an Indiana prison.
