= Charles Miller (gambler) =

American gambler, confidence man and swindler

Charles P. Miller
- Born: c. 1851; Texas, United States
- Died: November 7, 1881 (aged 30); New York City, New York
- Cause of death: Murdered
- Occupations: Gambler, confidence man and swindler
- Known for: New Orleans gambler known as "King of the Bunco Men"; ran one of the largest bunco operations in the United States during the late 19th century.

Charles P. Miller (c. 1851 – November 7, 1881) was an American gambler, confidence man and swindler. He was popularly known as "King of the Bunco Men", at times sharing that title with fellow tricksters Tom O'Brien and Joseph "Hungry Joe" Lewis, and ran one of the largest bunco operations in the United States during the late 19th century.

== Biography ==
=== Early life and criminal career ===
Charles Miller was born to a county officer in Texas around 1851. Growing up during Reconstruction, he was said to be an unruly child due to "parental indulgence". By age 15, he had begun drinking heavily and had reportedly "fallen into bad company with both sexes". He was eventually disowned by his father and began "riding the rails" until arriving in New Orleans, Louisiana. Miller began working as a "capper" for Major S.A. Doran at his Royal Street gambling house and while there began learning confidence tricks and bunco steering. When he had saved $35,000, he moved to New York City and opened a small gambling den which later became known as a notorious "skinning dive" in the city's underworld. Within a few years, Miller had organized a group con men who worked as bunco-steerers and green goods men out of the Astor House and the Fifth Avenue Hotel. Miller became a familiar underworld figure and, according to popular lore, he kept his headquarters at "a lamp-post on the southwest corner of Broadway and Twenty-Eighth Street, against which he could generally be found leaning".

Miller had originally arrived in New York and joined a "gambling clique" which had helped him in starting his gambling den. Once he had learned enough from them, he took another more knowledgeable partner and soon began competing with such leading swindlers as Joseph "Hungry Joe" Lewis and McDermott. Miller possessed a great deal of loyalty from his henchmen and, by directing his schemes though them, criminal prosecution against him was made extremely difficult. He also held a great deal of influence in the city legal system, due to his extensive police and political connections, which allowed considerable power to "pull the strings of the law when ever he so chose".

He was especially well known in the affluent communities of Long Branch, Nantasket Beach, Richfield Springs and other resorts frequented by New York high society. It was at these and similar areas that he directed his organization in swindling the wealthy residents. Miller spent at least half the year in high-class barrooms, restaurants and hotels, while he operated his organization during the summer. Although he is thought to have amassed at least several hundred thousand dollars in his lifetime, he spent much of his fortune living an extravagant lifestyle. He also incurred heavy gambling losses, especially on horse racing where he lost $20,000 in one day, and gave up playing faro when he lost $18,000 in one sitting at a Saratoga gambling resort.

=== Death ===
In the spring of 1881, Miller became involved in a violent feud with saloon keeper and burglar Billy Tracy. The dispute between the two men came to a head one night when Miller visited Tracy's saloon on West Twenty-Ninth Street. Tracy began to bully him once Miller entered the saloon but backed down when Miller indicated he would retaliate. Later when Tracy approached from behind, in which he was alleged to have shouted "I'll fix you!", Miller turned and fired his pistol at him. Miller fired three shots, one of which only slightly grazed Tracy, and the saloon keeper fell to the floor and began calling for the police. Miller's friends gathered around Tracy in a crowd and began laughing at him before eventually leaving. No arrests were made, however Tracy vowed to get revenge for his embarrassment.

At around midnight on November 7, 1881, Miller was drinking at Dick Darling's Broadway saloon with several of his friends including Bill Bowie, George Law Jr., Harry Rice, Charles Crawford and Billy Temple. After an hour, Tracy was seen peeking into the saloon from the front entrance. A few minutes later, he reentered the saloon and walked up to the bar to order a whiskey sour. He then turned to Miller and said "I came in here to kill you" before drawing a revolver and pointing it at his head before shooting him in the stomach. Miller reached for his pistol but collapsed onto the floor. Miller was taken by ambulance to the New York Hospital where he died from his wounds shortly after his arrival. Tracy was arrested and tried for his murder, however he was found not guilty due to perjured testimony and returned to running his saloon.
