= Bunko =

Bunko may refer to:

- Bunkō, a Japanese fire dog
- Bunkobon, a Japanese book format
- Bunko Kanazawa, a Japanese adult film actress
- Bunco (also Bunko and Bonko), a parlor game played in teams with three dice
- Kanazawa Bunko, a place name in Yokohama
- A confidence trick, also known as a bunco game
