= Buckwheat Donahue =

American storyteller

Robert Carlin Donahue Jr. (August 16, 1951 – October 14, 2019), better known as "Buckwheat" Donahue, was an American folklorist, storyteller, entertainer, historian, adventurer, and four-time gold-panning champion, best known for his involvement in many different aspects of life in Alaska's Inside Passage. Although known for his time in and work with Alaska, he was born and died in Oklahoma.

Donahue tried out to be a Frank H. Reid understudy in The Days of '98 Show. He was selected to play Reid. During casting, he paused on reaching commas, something that other auditioners could not do. According to Donahue, the director chose him for that capability since directing him would be the most effortless. He undertook additional parts in the production and took on the position of president for the Skagway Fraternal Order of Eagles.

As someone who took pleasure in the outdoors, Donahue started the Buckwheat Ski Classic in 1987 and co-founded the Dyea to Dawson Centennial Race to the Klondike, which later became known as the Yukon River Quest. Beginning on October 1, 2005, he walked 5,300 miles from Miami, Florida to Whitehorse, Yukon Territory, Canada, paddled a canoe on the Yukon River 2,200 miles to Kotlik, Alaska, then walked the remaining distance to Nome, Alaska as a fundraiser for The Heartbeat Trail, an effort to provide necessary equipment for the Dahl Memorial Clinic, the only hospital within 110 miles of his home base Skagway. The adventure took 327 days.

Donahue was the executive director of the Skagway Convention and Visitors Bureau. A captivating storyteller, he often entertained crowds of Skagway's many tourists with his tales of the Klondike Gold Rush of 1898. "He is a teller of tales that keep the spirit of Alaska alive," wrote Floridian Larry Ferguson in 2004. "He is a devotee of Robert Service whose poems paint the picture of Alaska during the Gold Rush. And he is, when you see him, the very visage of an Alaskan Sourdough."
