= Reed Waddell =

American confidence man and swindler

- Born: Reed C. Waddell c. 1860; Springfield, Illinois, United States
- Died: March 27, 1895 (aged 34–35); Paris, France
- Cause of death: Gunshot
- Other name: Kid Waddell
- Known for: Swindler and confidence man credited for the invention of the "gold brick game".

Reed C. Waddell (c. 1860 – March 27, 1895) was an American swindler, confidence man and underworld figure in New York during the mid- to late 19th century. He was one of the most successful men of his trade making nearly a quarter of a million dollars using his "gold brick" swindle, a con game which he invented and introduced to New York in 1880, and from which the term "goldbricker" originated.

Waddell was also involved in schemes with other prominent confidence men, including attempts to sell the Brooklyn Bridge, before his murder by noted bunco artist Tom O'Brien in 1895.

== Biography ==
Waddell was born in Springfield, Illinois, shortly before the American Civil War. Although raised in a respectable upper-middle-class family, he became known as a high-stakes gambler and was eventually cut off by his family before the age of 21. He arrived in 1880 in New York, where he offered the first gold brick ever offered for sale. This was part of his famed "gold brick" game in which the buyer, believing to be purchasing a gold brick from the U.S. Assayer's Office, was getting a lead bar with triple gold-plating and a rough finish with a small chunk of solid gold sunk in the middle. It also appeared to bear the official markings, such as the "U.S." and the name of the assayer stamped on either end of the gold bar and had the weight and fineness stamped on the underside.

The victim was brought to an accomplice posing as an assayer, who occupied an office and displayed the necessary equipment, who confirmed Waddell's claims. If the person was still not convinced, Waddell would take out a slug of real gold and suggest he take that piece to a jewelers where, even if the victim took him up on his offer, he would be satisfied when it was correctly identified by the jeweler. Waddell sold his first brick for $4,000 and began manufacturing bricks which were sold for between $3,500 and $7,000. He also expanded his operations into the "green goods" or sawdust swindle and, between the two ventures, he reportedly made $250,000 within ten years.

Waddell eventually moved his operations to Paris, France, working in partnership with Tom O'Brien, but was murdered by him there in an argument over shares of a bunco swindle on March 27, 1895. He had been shot several times by O'Brien, twice in the back and chest as well as suffering wounds to his head and heart, at the Northern Railway Station. O'Brien was arrested by French authorities; however, his trial was postponed when the United States Department of State requested that he be extradited to the United States.
