= William Sidney "Cap" Light =

American lawman

Light, William Sidney "Cap"
- Born: c. 1863; Texas
- Died: December 24, 1893 (aged 30); Texas
- Occupation: lawman
- Spouse: Eva Katherine Smith
- Parent(s): W. R. and Eliza Hyatt Light

William Sidney "Cap" Light was a Texas lawman from 1884 until his death in 1893, when he accidentally shot himself. He had a shining reputation, except for the period (1891–1892) when he worked for his brother-in-law, the infamous badman, Soapy Smith in Denver and Creede, Colorado.

Light was born in late 1863, or possibly early 1864, near Belton, Texas. The son of W. R. Light, a merchant, and Eliza Hyatt Light, both from Tennessee. William Light's first calling was that of a barber, but at age 20, he accepted a position as a deputy marshal in Belton. It is believed he was a member of the posse that tracked down and fatally shot a local desperado, William Northcott. on March 24, 1884.

Light married the sister of Soapy Smith, Eva Katherine Smith, of Temple, Texas in June 1887. They had a son, William Jeff Light in 1890 and a daughter, Emma Ruby Light in 1892.

== Light's first confirmed kill ==
In the fall of 1889, Sam Hasley, a trouble-maker with a deputy sheriff's commission, that allowed him to carry a gun, was drunk causing problems in Belton. Light ordered him to go home; instead, Hasley rode his horse onto the sidewalk, daring the young lawman to do something about it. Light attempted to arrest Hasley, but Hasley pulled out his revolver. Light was left with little choices. He fired his own pistol, killing Hasley.

Working for the marshal of Temple, deputy Light shot at gunman Ed Cooley in August 1889, while taking the captured prisoner to jail and Cooley attempted to escape. The outcome of the event is unknown.

== His second confirmed killing ==
In March 1890, Felix Moralas was drunk and causing trouble in Temple's Cotton Exchange Saloon. When Moralas was confronted by Light, Moralas attempted to pull his gun. Light was faster. Moralas sank to the floor and died with, according to the newspaper, "his pistol in one hand and a beer glass in the other."

== William Light, Soapy Smith, and the third killing ==
In 1891, William Light joined up with his brother-in-law, Jefferson Randolph Soapy Smith and his criminal empire in Denver, Colorado. Light was with "Soapy" and the soap gang when they attacked the Glasson Detective Agency. In 1892, Soapy Smith made himself the "boss" of the new silver rush camp of Creede, Colorado. Soapy urged his brother-in-law, William Light, to accept a position as camp deputy marshal. Light accepted. William "Reddy" McCann, a Creede faro dealer, with a killing history of his own, was drinking heavily one night. At about 4:15 a.m. on March 31, 1892, McCann was on Main street shooting out street lights. McCann retired into the Branch Saloon when Light walked in and confronted him. Light attempted to arrest McCann who resisted. Light tried to talk sense into McCann, then suddenly slapped McCann in the face, knocking a cigar out of his mouth. Both men drew their weapons and fired, five or six shots in all. McCann fell to the floor and his last words were, "I'm killed." The coroner's jury showed that Light had used self-defense, but Light was so distraught over the killing that he quit his job and the Soapy Smith gang.

== Light shot in the head ==
William Light returned to Temple, Texas, where in June 1892, he applied for a position as a detective for the Gulf, Colorado & Santa Fe Railroad. He was turned down. It appears that he believed that the railroad's chief detective, T. J. Coggins, was responsible for his job denial. One day, while drinking, he approached Coggins and struck him repeatedly with his fists and his pistol barrel. He was arrested for the assault, and when asked why he attacked Coggins, he blamed Coggins for "causing good men to lose their jobs."

Light was arraigned on the charge of assault. At the hearing, Coggins rose from his seat and pointed his .44 revolver at Light's head and fired several shots. One bullet entered near his right ear, and another into his neck, just below the jaw. Light's wounds were pronounced fatal, but he eventually fully recovered. Coggins was arrested for attempted murder but never faced trial.

== Light accidentally kills himself ==
On December 24, 1893, while heading home Christmas Eve on a Missouri, Kansas & Texas train car, William Sidney "Cap" Light, accidentally pulled the trigger of the revolver in his pocket. The bullet severed his femoral artery. At age 30, he hemorrhaged to death within minutes.

== Sources ==
- Wild West Magazine, April, 2006
- The Soapy Smith Preservation Trust website- William Light was a member of the gang and Soapy's brother-in-law.
