= Shootout on Juneau Wharf =

1898 gunfight between American gangsters in Skagway, Alaska

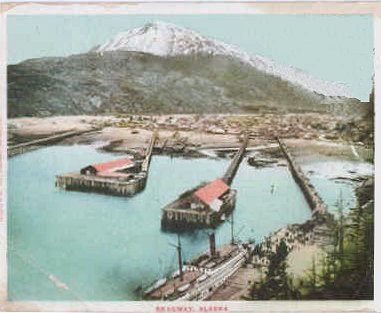
- The four docks in Skagway. Juneau Wharf is the second from the left.
- Date: July 8, 1898
- Location: Skagway, District of Alaska, United States; 59.4537°N 135.3210°W
- Participants: Jefferson Randolph Smith, Frank H. Reid, Jesse Murphy, Josias Martin Tanner, John Landers.
- Outcome: 2 killed

The Shootout on Juneau Wharf was a gunfight between Jefferson Randolph "Soapy" Smith, Frank H. Reid, and Jesse Murphy that took place on Friday, July 8, 1898, at approximately 9:15 p.m. in Skagway, District of Alaska, in the United States. Smith was shot in the heart and died shortly afterwards, and Reid died of his injuries 12 days later.

== Background ==
The founding of Skagway, a port town on the Inside Passage in Alaska's panhandle, in December 1897, attracted western crime boss Jefferson Randolph "Soapy" Smith and his gang of confidence men, as the town was the primary American starting point leading to the White Pass Trail and ultimately the Klondike gold fields, which had been discovered in 1896 and triggered a massive gold rush in the region. Smith had been well known as a streetside confidence trickster and racketeer in Denver and Creede, Colorado, where he was threatened with imprisonment as a criminal in 1895 and fled the state. When interest in the gold rush peaked, he set up his swindle operations in Skagway and quickly became the region's underworld boss, just as he had done in Denver and Creede.

Victims of the so-called Soap Gang's confidence swindles had little recourse; the deputy United States Marshal was receiving graft from Smith, enabling the gang to operate with little fear of arrest. That and the already-slow legal system in the area made the resolution of crime difficult at best.

A vigilance committee calling themselves the Committee of 101 demanded relief via the federal government. When that proved too slow, they took matters into their own hands and posted handbills around Skagway ordering the "bunco men" (Note: Though the gang was better known for three-card monte than bunco (a dice game), the term "bunco" was applied generically to gambling-based swindles; see bunco for more information.) to leave the town or face the consequences. Smith retaliated by forming his own "law and order committee", but he claimed his consisted of "317 citizens". He also had handbills printed up and posted around town warning the vigilantes from attempting to take the law into their own hands. Tensions escalated and climaxed on July 8, 1898, with the robbery of a returning miner's gold.

== Prelude ==
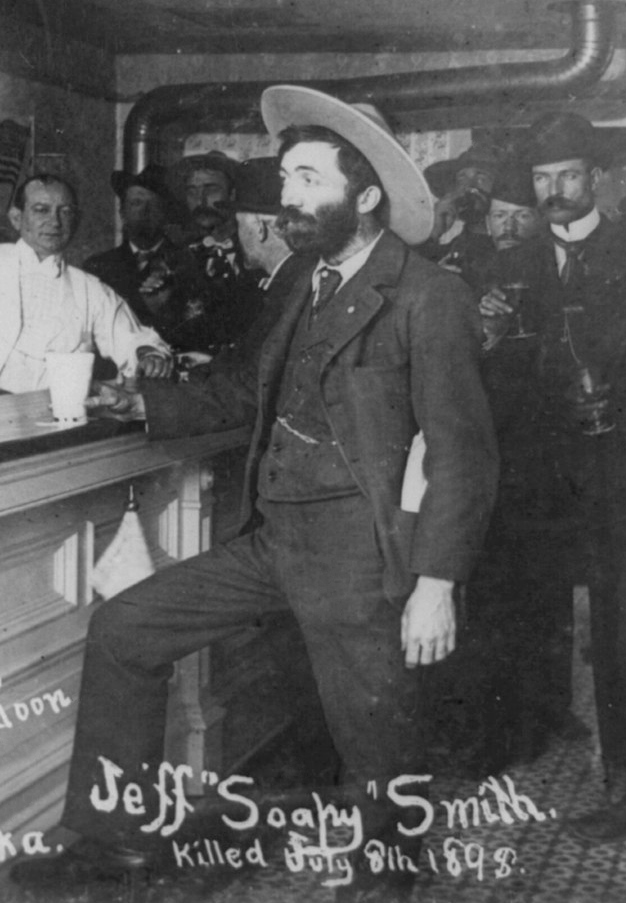
Soapy Smith at a bar in Skagway, Alaska, 1898

On July 8, 1898, John Douglas Stewart arrived in Skagway, returning from his claim in the Klondike with a canvas pouch containing $2,600 (equivalent to $100,620 in 2025) worth of gold and $87 in cash. Stewart placed his gold in a local store safe and rented a room to wait for passage on an outgoing steamer.

Around 10:00 AM, Stewart was met by John L. "Reverend" Bowers and W. E. "Slim-Jim" Foster, two members of Soapy Smith's gang. They lured Stewart into the alleyway beside Jeff Smith's Parlor. Once there, they were joined by Van B. "Old Man" Triplett, who started up a game of three-card Monte to swindle Stewart out of his gold. Stewart lost his $87 in cash, some of which Triplett then offered to return to continue the game. He was then asked to provide evidence that he could pay it back if he lost. Stewart reported what happened next:

I told Foster I should hold him for the money, and the old man, Van Triplett, said we acted as if we could not trust him, and gave some of the money back, and then said he would give us a chance to win it [all back], so Foster turned the right card and [Triplett] started to give him the money, but said, "Supposing you had bet that in earnest, did you have the money to put up?" Foster said, "No", and turning to me said, "You have the money", and I said no, I did not have any money; that he took it all, but he said, "You have some dust", and wanted me to get it just to show the old man that we had the money in case the bet had been a real one. Bowers and I went to Kaufman's store to get the money and Van Triplett and Foster remained behind. We came back with the dust and I unrolled it and showed them the sack, and the old man said he did not know if that was gold, and Bowers said, "Open it and show it to him, as he don't know gold dust when he sees it", but I did not open it, and [was] just about to roll it up again, when Foster grabbed it and handing it to the old man, said, "Git!" and I started to grab the old man when they held me and said if I made a noise it would not be well for me. I pulled away from them and started after the old man, but could not see him and then went across the street and asked a party where there was an officer: that I had been robbed of $3,000 by some men over there.

Stewart tried to file a complaint with Deputy U.S. Marshal Sylvester S. Taylor. Taylor was under Smith's control and informed Stewart that if he kept quiet about the affair he (Taylor) would see what he could do. Stewart complained to anyone who would listen, including U.S. Commissioner Charles A. Sehlbrede, who was stationed in the neighboring town of Dyea.

Learning of the unrest over the robbery, Smith took to the streets, mingling with the residents and merchants, and claiming that no one had been robbed. Smith argued that Stewart had lost his gold in a square game. Between 2 and 6 p.m., "at least a dozen men went to Soapy Smith and tried to get him to disavow the robbery and give up the men." Smith, however, maintained his position and "declined to do anything about the matter", finally stating in exasperation "that if Stewart had not 'hollered', he [Smith] would feel like going out and getting him a piece of the money" back. In contrast with the Alaskan, Smith told several businessmen he would make amends.

During the early part of the excitement, Smith partially promised several men, including the writer, that ... [if there were] no "roar" made in the papers, the gold would be returned by 4 o'clock that evening, and that his influence would be used to prevent his men from in any way interfering with returning Klondikers in the future.

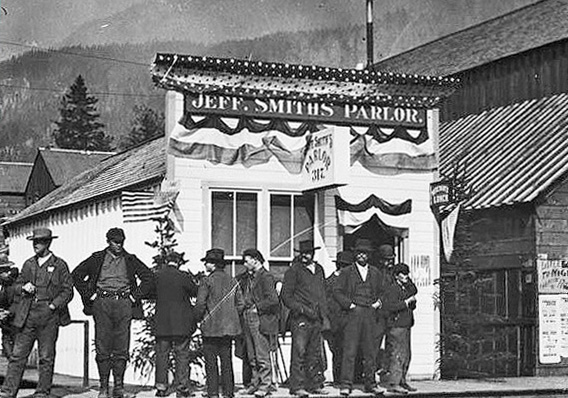
Jeff Smiths' Parlor in 1898

Smith had said the gold would be returned by four, but the hour passed with no word. When told by a Skaguay News reporter that unless the gold was returned there would be trouble, Smith is said to have replied, "By God, trouble is what I am looking for."

Arriving in Skaguay, Commissioner Sehlbrede sent for Smith to come to the marshal's office. Smith arrived at 6 p.m. In the presence of the marshal and a Daily Alaskan reporter, Sehlbrede demanded that the gold and the men responsible be turned in. Smith stuck to his defense that

... the boys who had the money won it in a fair game and they should keep it. He also said he had a hundred men who would stand behind him and see that they were protected. The judge finally told him he [Smith] could not afford to stand up for a gang of thieves, but he [Smith] almost screamed—"Well, Judge, declare me in with the thieves. I'll stay with them", and with that he passionately beat the table with his fist and left the room.

Smith left the meeting, for Sehlbrede next got around to asking the men present in the room whether they would arrest Smith and his whole gang if he issued warrants. The reply was unanimous and emphatic: Smith and every one of his men would be brought in. Sehlbrede added that "he wanted the men ... alive if possible, but dead if necessary."

In the meantime, two separate vigilante groups, the Merchants Committee and the Citizens Committee, began to call for immediate action to rid the town of the "bunco men". Several hundred people attended the latter organization's meeting at Sylvester Hall, too many for the facility to accommodate. It was also rumored that members of the Soap Gang had infiltrated the hall to cause disruption. As a result, another meeting was called to be held at the end of the Skaguay Wharf Improvement Company, more commonly known as Juneau Wharf.

== Shootout ==
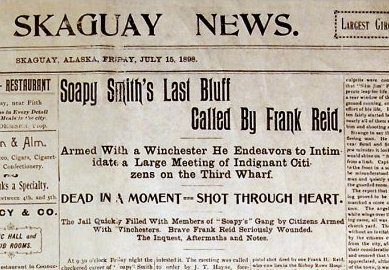
Newspaper headline of the fight

At the first meeting of the Citizens Committee, Thomas Whitten of the Golden North hotel had been elected chairman. He appointed four men "to guard the approach to the dock in order that no objectionable characters might be admitted to disturb the deliberations of the meeting." They were Frank H. Reid, Captain Josias Martin Tanner, Jesse Murphy, and John Landers. They were unarmed except for Reid, the apparent leader of the four guards, who had a .38 revolver on his person.

Reid, a 54-year-old resident of Oregon, had worked as a bartender in the Klondike Saloon, a gambling den under Smith's control. He became the city engineer and operated lot sales to miners. Tanner was a 48-year-old captain of barges and steamers to and from Skagway; after the shootout, he was appointed a Deputy U.S. Marshal. Jesse Murphy was an Irish employee of the newly arrived White Pass and Yukon Railway. Very little is known of John Landers.

On the evening of July 8, 1898, about 9 p.m., Soapy Smith was inside Smith's Parlor drinking when William "Bill" Saportas, a reporter for the Daily Alaskan and a member of the Soap Gang, came to Smith and gave him a note that read, "'the crowd is angry, if you want to do anything do it quick.' ... [signed] 'S'." Smith stuffed the note into his pocket, grabbed a Winchester Model 1892 .44-40 rifle and possibly his Colt Model 1889 New Army .41 Long Colt double-action revolver and decided to attend the vigilante meeting. With six or seven of his men following at a distance, he walked west on Holly to State Street and turned south toward the Juneau Wharf six blocks away.

The wharf extended nearly a half mile into the bay. It was between 15 and 20 feet wide and came straight in over the mud and gravel beach at a height of 6 to 10 feet. At the wharf entrance, John Landers was talking with another man. About 60 feet down the wharf against the west railing, Josias Tanner and Jesse Murphy stood near each other. Frank Reid stood further on, alone. Their job was to identify Soap Gang members and prevent them from entering the meeting then in progress.

Sometime between 9 and 9:30 p.m., Smith approached the wharf entrance. He held his rifle over his right shoulder, muzzle pointing upwards and to the rear. At the entrance, he ordered the men who followed him to remain there while he proceeded alone up the center of the wharf. Approaching Landers and the other man, Smith ordered them off the wharf. They obeyed by jumping over the side to the beach about six feet below. Smith continued, passing Tanner and Murphy without addressing them, nor did they offer resistance. Smith continued towards Reid, who called out, "Halt, you can't go down there." Witnesses claimed Reid and Smith argued for a few seconds, swearing at each other.

At this point Reid is generally believed to have still had his revolver tucked away and that Smith still had his Winchester shouldered, but about what happened in the few seconds before gunfire erupted, accounts differ greatly. Some claim Reid drew his weapon first, while others claim Reid did not draw until Smith attempted to shoot him.

The two men moved to face each other within a few feet. At some point, Smith suddenly swung his rifle off his shoulder and struck at Reid. Whether he was intending to shoot at that moment or to club Reid aside is uncertain. Reid raised his left arm to block the fast-approaching barrel. It struck and cut his arm, but he managed to grab the barrel and yank it away from the general direction of his head and press it downward. The Daily Alaskan wrote that Reid grabbed the rifle barrel without being cut, but that during the scuffle, Smith pulled it free and hit Reid's arm as he swung the rifle at Reid again.

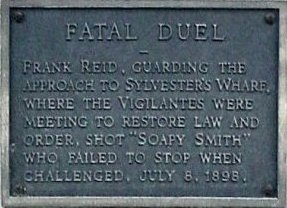
A memorial marker at State Street and 1st Avenue in Skagway

Reid grabbed the rifle barrel with his left hand and pressed it down, and with his right he drew his revolver (if not already drawn) and pointed it at Smith. At that moment, Smith is said to have shouted, "My God, don't shoot!" Reid pulled the trigger, but the hammer fell on a faulty cartridge. Reid tried to shoot again as Smith jerked his rifle from Reid's desperate grasp and quickly moved it in the direction of Reid.

Many accounts state that both men fired in near perfect unison. Some stated it sounded as if one shot had been fired. "One witness said it looked as if the guns were spitting fire at the same time." Then, a number of shots followed, ranging between five and nine according to different testimonies. As reports tell of a total of five entry wounds in the two men, the minimum number of shots fired had to be five. The exchange occurred rapidly. Reid received a bullet to one leg. Reid fired two more rounds, one grazing Smith's left arm and the other striking his left thigh above the knee and exiting the other side. Chambering his Winchester, Smith sent a bullet into Reid's lower abdomen and groin. Reid fell face down upon the planking, severely wounded. It is not known if Smith remained standing or also had fallen.

Seconds after the initial exchange of gunfire, Smith's men began running toward their wounded leader, weapons drawn. Murphy rushed over to Smith and wrestled the Winchester from his hands and turned the rifle towards Smith. This is another moment believed to have been the time that Smith hollered out, "My God, don't shoot", but Murphy pulled the trigger, killing him instantly with a bullet to the heart.

Murphy, then faced with the charging gang members, raised the rifle toward them and took aim. Gang member W. H. Jackson pointed his revolver at Tanner, who testified that Jackson was "possibly twenty or thirty feet" away. Tanner was unarmed and could do nothing. Jackson probably noticed Murphy was aiming his now-dead boss' rifle in his direction. This, coupled with the rapid approach of men from the Citizen's Committee, who had prematurely ended their meeting with the sound of gunfire, perhaps convinced Jackson not to fire his pistol at Tanner. Someone yelled out towards Smith's men, "They have killed Soapy, and if you don't clear out quick they will kill you too." Not wanting to engage in a gun battle in which they were vastly outnumbered, the gang fled.

== Aftermath ==
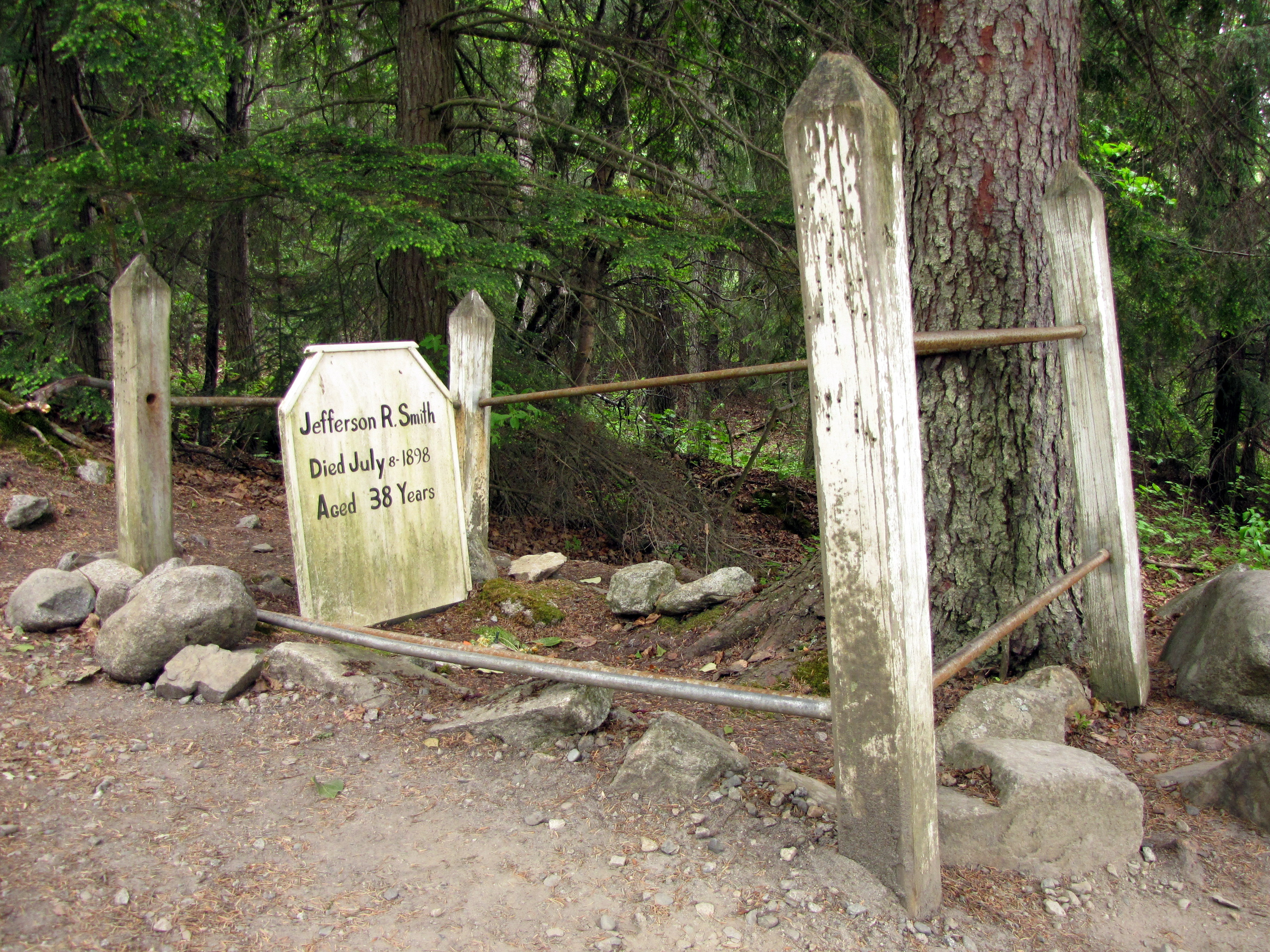
Soapy Smith's grave

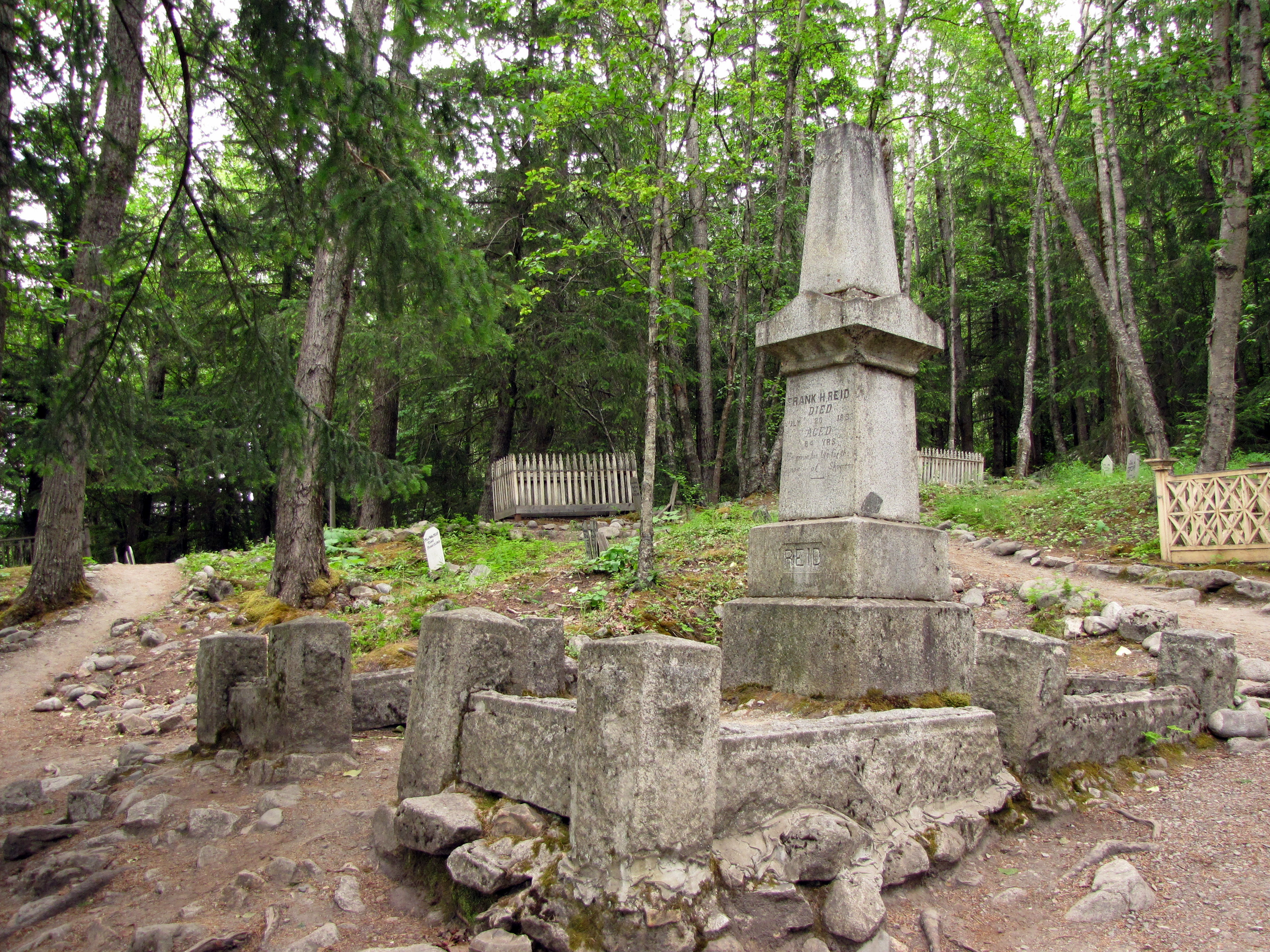
Frank Reid's grave

Smith's criminal empire was over and the vigilante leaders took over control and rounded up the Soap Gang. The United States Army, stationed in Dyea, threatened martial law.

After the gang fled, Tanner rushed over to Reid and asked for his pistol, which lay under him. Reid replied that he was badly hurt, but he managed to roll off his gun. Except for two empty shells and one cartridge, it was empty. Reid died from his wounds twelve days later. Reid's funeral was the largest in Skagway's history and his gravestone was inscribed with the words "He gave his life for the honor of Skagway." On July 14, 1898, six days after the robbery and gunfight, John Stewart's gold was found by vigilantes inside Soapy's trunk located in an outbuilding behind Jeff Smith's Parlor. All but $600 of the gold was there.

== In popular culture ==
In Skagway, Alaska, July 8 has been the annual Soapy Smith Wake since 1974. This event used to take place at Soapy's graveside in the gold rush cemetery, but is now held in the downtown area at the Eagles Hall.

July 8 is also the annual Soapy Smith Party at The Magic Castle nightclub, in Hollywood, California, complete with costume contests, charity gambling, and magic shows to memorialize the day of the shootout.

== See also ==
- List of Old West gunfights
- The Shooting of Dan McGrew
