= Hungry Joe =

American criminal (1850–1902)

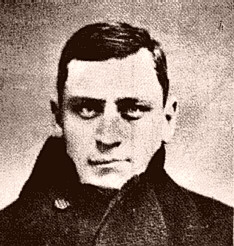
- Born: Francis J. Alvany c. 1850; Chicago, Illinois, United States
- Died: March 22, 1902 (aged 52); New York City, New York, United States
- Other names: Hungry Joe Lewis; John Jacob Astorhouse; Charles Clayton; Henry F. Post; William C. Howard; Louis Alcaser; Francis J. Alvany
- Occupation: Confidence man
- Known for: Leading confidence man in the United States during the late 19th century; once swindled Oscar Wilde out of $5,000 playing a bunco game.

Joseph "Hungry Joe" Lewis (c. 1850 – March 22, 1902) was an American criminal and swindler. He was regarded as one of the top confidence and bunco men in the United States during the late 19th century whose success was matched only by contemporaries such as Tom O'Brien and Charles P. Miller, sharing the title of "King of the Bunco Men" with both men at various times in his career.

Over a period of 30 years, Lewis amassed a huge personal fortune almost solely through targeting wealthy bankers, merchants and other prominent figures. This was most often because more of a profit could be made while they were less likely to report the crime to police. Among his more well-known victims were General John A. Logan, Judge Noah Davis, Charles Francis Adams, and most notably Irish author Oscar Wilde.

An 1885 biography of Lewis attributes to him the phrase "There's a sucker born every minute."

== Biography ==
=== Early criminal career ===
Originally from Chicago, Illinois, Lewis had several runs-in with the law during the 1880s and early 1890s. In 1880, Lewis was arrested for the shooting of Boston thief Billy Flynn in Detroit but was acquitted by a jury who ruled he had acted in self-defense. He later made the acquaintance of Gen. John A. Logan, and one night while dining with him at the Fifth Avenue Hotel, a hotel detective informed Logan of Lewis's identity. Logan scoffed at the detective's claim and remarked "Why sir, that man is one of my best friends. You have made a terrible mistake here". Lewis excused himself after borrowing $500 from him and disappeared. He similarly befriended Charles Francis Adams and lured the elderly man into a Boston Common bunco game where he and his friends swindled him out of several thousand dollars. Later in Philadelphia, he represented himself to Samuel J. Randall as the son of banker A.J. Drexel. He was apparently so convincing that, when the actual son of Drexel called on the house by chance, Ramsden believed the young man was the impostor and threw him out of his home. He and another noted bunco man called Western Sam spent an entire summer in Long Branch, New Jersey where they conned over $100,000 from residents.

The most famous of victims was perhaps Irish author Oscar Wilde whom he met in New York City while visiting the U.S. on a lecture tour in 1882. Lewis dined with Wilde at the Hotel Brunswick for several days before managing to persuade Wilde in joining a bunco game. Wilde lost $5,000 and gave Lewis a check for the Park National Bank, but afterwards stopped payment when he learned he had been swindled. Lewis later claimed that he had taken $1,500 in cash from Wilde before he was discovered. Inspector Thomas F. Byrnes, then head of the NYPD Detective's Bureau, later commented that when Wilde had "reaped a harvest of American dollars with his curls, sun flowers and knee-britches" he was no less a swindler than Lewis "only not quite so sharp".

=== Years in New York City ===
Lewis became so infamous in New York City, his base of operations for many years, that he was once thrown out of the Twenty-Ninth Precinct by Captain Alexander "Clubber" Williams having recognized him as the man who attempted to con his brother while on the Pavona Ferry in 1884.

Lewis was arrested with a young protégé named Oliver Wilson while attempting to draw in victims for a local bunco game in Broadway on April 21, 1885. Police had received reports that there had been bunco men operating in the district as county merchants were arriving in the city to make their annual spring purchases. When police officers arrived at the scene, they "saw them accost a number of persons, shake hands with them, and act in the manner of "bunco steerers". They were tried at the Jefferson Market Police Court the following day on a charge of disorderly conduct. Lewis explained away the charges by pointing out that he did not collect a crowd, obstruct the sidewalk, use profane or improper language, or any other cause which legally defined "disorderly conduct". He also denied having "accosted strangers" stating to the judge "I am not in the habit of accosting strangers. I spoke to and shook hands with several friends. That is the way, I believe, that gentlemen greet one another in the street. I did nothing to justify this arrest". One of these men, Lewis claimed, had asked him directions to the Astor Library at which time he was arrested. Despite his defense, Wilson and he were both fined $10. Though both men were well-dressed and "wore what appeared to be gold-mounted chains", neither had watches or any collateral to pay for their release.

A month later, Lewis attempted to swindle vacationing wealthy British manufacturer Joseph Ramsden who was in New York for health reasons. Shortly after his arrival from Manchester, England, on which he had traveled on the Cunard steamer Gallia, he booked into a Broadway hotel. Lewis approached Ramsden the next day while taking a walk down Broadway. He greeted Ramsden near the Metropolitan Hotel calling the surprised tourist by name and inquiring about his health. When Ransden expressed his astonishment at having been recognized by, in his view, a total stranger, Lewis introduced himself as the nephew of the captain of the Gallia and who had "spoke very kindly of him". Claiming to be a manufacturer of women's undergarments in Baltimore, he then used the introduction to lure him to a bunco game. Lewis explained that he was preparing to leave for Baltimore but offered Ramsden to join him as he went to purchase tickets at a nearby railroad station. Ramsden agreed and the two walked together down Broadway while Lewis gave him a guided tour and pointing out businesses and giving exaggerated accounts of business dealing with various New York business firms.

They eventually arrived at a building on Canal Street and proceeded to an office of the second floor where Lewis "bought" a ticket from a young man. While there, Lewis showed Ramsden his valise and showed him the various tools of his trade, mainly muslin and paint goods, before discovering a pack of cards at the bottom of the bag. He then demonstrated a card trick which he claimed had cost him $400 in a Bowery saloon the day before. Showing him how to play three-card monte, the man who had sold Lewis the ticket encouraged Ramsden to play a hand. When Ramsden refused to bet however, the man attempted to provoke him claiming he had no money to bet with. He then asked Lewis to leave, and turning to the young man, he showed him a roll of bank notes from the Bank of England worth £50. At this point, Lewis grabbed the roll and ran out of the building. When the astonished Ramsden had recovered, he went outside to find Lewis but he had escaped. Similarly, he returned to the office to find the room had been emptied.

On the advice of friends, Ramsden reported the incident to NYPD Police Headquarters whereupon Lewis immediately was identified as the suspect. This was the first charge of robbery brought against Lewis, and the case against him was so great that Inspector Byrnes ordered an extensive citywide "arrest-on-sight" search. Lewis managed to avoid capture for a time, and the police were unable to find him at his usual hangouts. However, he eventually was spotted on Broadway by Inspector Byrnes and Detective Richard O'Connor who followed him to a house on Sixth Avenue where he was arrested. He later was identified by Ramsden in a police lineup with seven other men. He continually denied the charge claiming his name as Henry F. Post. Although he had been arrested numerous times, this was the first time Lewis had been convicted. He served four years in Sing Sing.

=== Imprisonment in Baltimore ===
In May 1888, Lewis was released after serving three years. Lewis was identified eight months later in the NYPD's "Rogue's Gallery" by William J. Bansemer, a wealthy and retired Baltimore merchant, who lost $5,000 to him in a bunco game. He was arrested in New York on December 1, 1888, and extradited to Baltimore to stand trial. On December 20, 1888, Lewis was convicted of having "bunkoed" Bansemer out and sentenced to nine years in the Maryland State Penitentiary, but his term was reduced for good behavior, and he was released on June 20, 1896. Upon his release, he spoke against his imprisonment claiming he had been wrongly convicted. He further claimed that he could have been able to provide an alibi if had he been given the opportunity, but that he had been advised by his lawyer to plead guilty in order to avoid a maximum 15-year jail sentence. Lewis blamed the "frame up" on Inspector Byrnes, who he claimed had a long-standing grudge against him and had used his influence to manipulate the police investigation and trial. He also made vague accusations regarding Bynes involvement in police misconduct and corruption, but nothing came of the charges.

Byrnes has a grudge against me which dates back some years. It was on account of some money matters. I had made some $15,000 in Chicago - but never mind that. If I was disposed to tell all I knew, the public would have less confidence in Inspector Byrnes. If he had received all that he deserves, he, and not I, would to-day be serving time. It was he who prevented me from engaging in legitimate business. I had been offered $25,000 to go into the bookmaking business but Byrnes stepped in and broke me up.

On the morning of his release, he was given $167 by Warden Weyler, which he had earned during his last 18 months in prison. Lewis's health and appearance had reportedly been significantly affected during imprisonment, the New York Times noting "his powerful frame does not indicate the sprightliness and vigor of seven years ago. His keen eyes have dimmed, and his hair is sprinkled with silver". He moved to New York City where he claimed he intended to lead an honest life as a bookmaker and "follow the horse races".

=== Death ===
Lewis visited NYPD Police Headquarters upon his arrival in New York two days later and informed Captain Stephen O'Brien, who had succeeded Byrnes as chief of detectives, of his intentions. He apparently remained true to his word, and as of early 1902, he was observed by Captain George McClusky working as a cigar vendor in the Bowery. On March 22, 1902, Lewis's death was reported by NYPD police officials and announced in the New York Times and the New York Sun the following day. The report could not be verified however, his death having once been falsely reported in Baltimore, and his name was not listed in the New York City Board of Health. His friends responded that he had died in an apartment house on Manhattan's West Side and that his funeral had been held three days after his death. The name on the coffin, they claimed, was unrelated to Lewis so he could be buried anonymously.

He was known to a whole generation as the king of the confidence men. Owen Davis mentions him in his 1906 collection of New York Tenderloin stories Sketches of Gotham (written under the name of ‘Ike Swift’). In the story "The End of the Road", Swift spoke of the ease with which a deception had been practiced by one lady of doubtful reputation upon another. Swift stated, simply, "The blonde fell like a farmer before Hungry Joe".
