= There's a sucker born every minute =

Phrase associated with American showman P. T. Barnum

"There's a sucker born every minute" is a quotation often associated with American showman P. T. Barnum (1810–1891), although there is no evidence that he actually said it. Early instances of its use are found among salesmen, gamblers and confidence tricksters.

== Attribution to Barnum ==
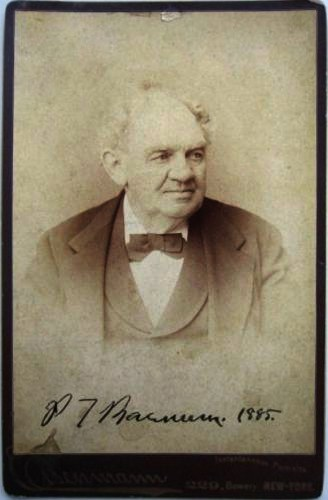
A photo of P. T. Barnum by Charles Eisenmann, 1885

Barnum's biographer Arthur H. Saxon tried to track down when Barnum had uttered this phrase but was unable to verify it. According to Saxon, "There's no contemporary account of it, or even any suggestion that the word 'sucker' was used in the derogatory sense in his day. Barnum was just not the type to disparage his patrons."

Some reference books, such as The Oxford Dictionary of American Quotations, claim that the originator was not Barnum, but probably the famous con man Joseph "Paper Collar Joe" Bessimer. Other sources allege it was first uttered by a banker named David Hannum in reference to Barnum's part in the Cardiff Giant hoax. Hannum was exhibiting the "fossilized giant" and had unsuccessfully sued Barnum for showcasing a plaster replica of the giant, but advertising it as the original. Crowds continued to pay to see Barnum's exhibit, even after both it and Hannum's "original" had been proven to be fakes.

A circus competitor to Barnum, Adam Forepaugh, attributed the quotation to Barnum in an 1880s newspaper interview, but it was likely an attempt by Forepaugh to discredit his rival.

To bolster the claim that Barnum was not the originator, a variation of the saying was published in January 1806—four years before Barnum was born—in "Essay on False Genius" in The European Magazine and London Review. The essay relates an antisemitic anecdote in which a person expresses astonishment at a Jewish salesman's ability to sell his damaged and worthless commodities, to which the salesman replies, "there vash von fool born every minute."

== Gamblers and con men ==
In the late 19th century, the phrase gained currency among gamblers and con men as a cynical comment on human gullibility. In an 1879 article entitled "Gambling in Chicago", an "old-timer" says about the struggles of hard-up gamblers: "[G]oodness knows how they live, it's mighty hard times with the most of them; in the season they make a bit on base ball, or on the races, and then, you know, 'there's a sucker born every minute'." The use of surrounding quotation marks indicates the "sucker born every minute" maxim must have been fairly well known at that time.

Another source credits Michael Cassius McDonald, a Chicago saloon owner in the 1870s, as the originator. According to Herbert Asbury's book Gem of the Prairie (1940), McDonald was equipping his new gambling house, known as "The Store", when his partner wondered if they could lure enough players for the large number of roulette wheels and faro tables being installed. McDonald allegedly said, "Don't worry about that, there's a sucker born every minute."

The phrase appeared in print in the 1885 biography of the noted swindler Joseph "Hungry Joe" Lewis, "King of the Bunco Men". The author writes:

It was always a saying with Joe that there was a sucker born every minute, and all through his business career he acted on that basis, and generally found a good crop of them.

According to linguist David Maurer's The Big Con (1940), a similar adage circulated among American con men in the late 19th and early 20th centuries: "There's a mark born every minute, and five to trim him and five to knock him." Here "mark" refers to the intended victim of a scam; "trim" means to steal from; and "knock" means to scare away from a scam. Hence, the overall meaning: There is no shortage of new victims, nor of con men, nor of honest men who want to save a mark from being scammed. Maurer adds that the adage was often used ironically because all con men knew that a mark, once he had "the fever" thinking he was about to win lots of money, "literally cannot be knocked."

== In popular culture ==
In the John Dos Passos novel The 42nd Parallel (1930), the quotation is attributed to Mark Twain.

In Star Trek: The Next Generation season 4 episode 13 ("Devil's Due"), Captain Jean-Luc Picard mentions "There's a sucker born every minute" as he explores the possibility of a con artist at work, and Lieutenant Commander Data attributes the phrase to P. T. Barnum.

The Bollywood film Ek Khiladi Ek Haseena gives a Hindi counterpart: "Har Ek Minute, Ek Bakra paida hota hai; aur do usko halaal karne ke liye" [There is sucker born every minute; and two to con him].

Ӏn rapper Eminem's song "Bagpipes from Baghdad" from his aӀbum Relapse, one of the Ӏyrics states, "Every minute there's a sucker born, snuck up on Malachi. Made the motherfucker suck on a shuck of corn"
