= Hungry Joe (Montana) =

Hungry Joe, Montana
- Butte
- Location within Montana Location within the United States
- Coordinates: 47°05′46″N 104°41′58″W
- Country: United States
- State: Montana
- County: Dawson
- Elevation: 2,441 ft (744 m)
- Time zone: UTC-7 (Mountain (MST))
  - Summer (DST): UTC-6 (MDT)
- GNIS feature ID: 772623

Hungry Joe is a butte in Dawson County, Montana, United States. It was named for an old prospector who lived nearby. According to the Works Progress Administration, "its summit, accessible by an easy hike over an old road, provides a view across the weird and bright-colored distortions of the badlands to the south."
