= Frank H. Reid =

19th-century American military officer, engineer, and vigilante

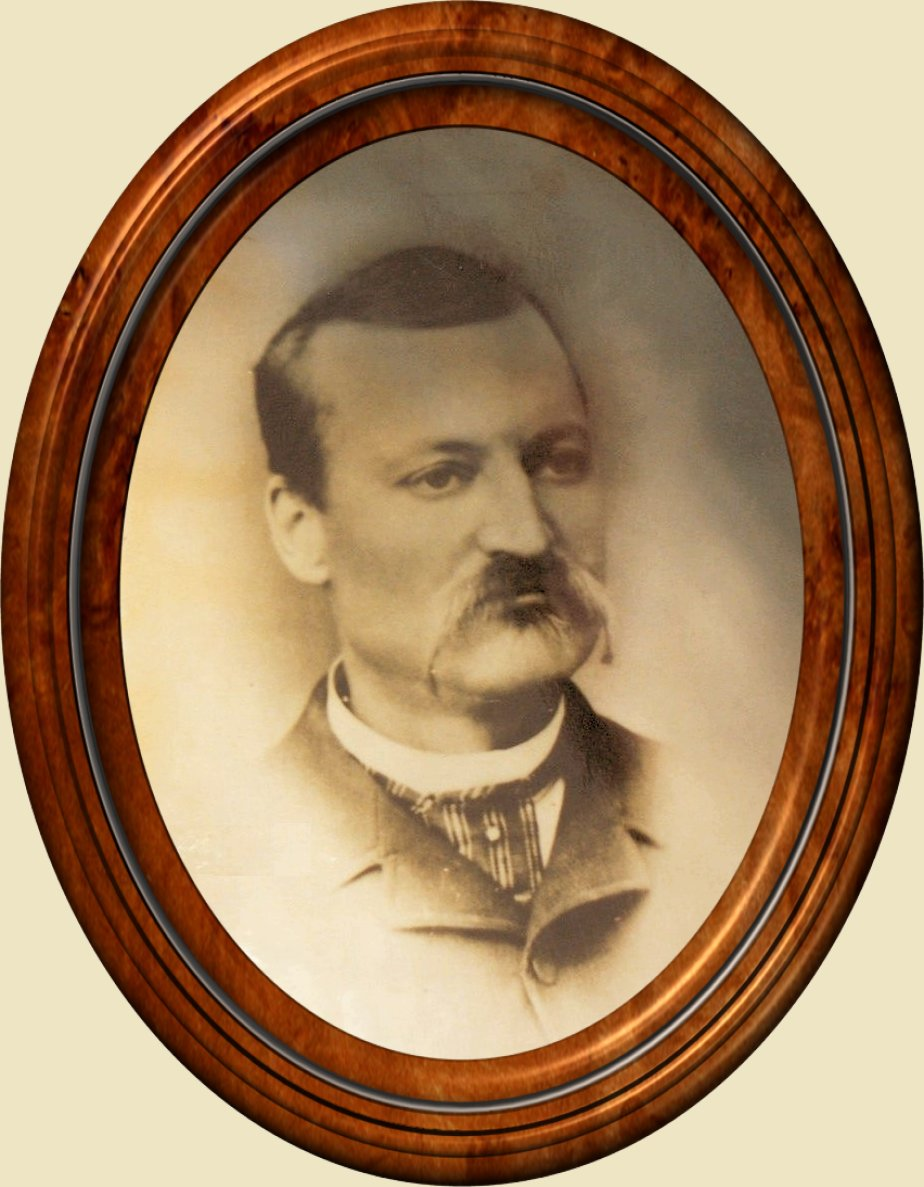
- Born: Frank H. Reid c. 1844; Illinois
- Died: July 20, 1898 (aged 53–54); Skagway, District of Alaska
- Cause of death: Gunshot wounds
- Resting place: Gold Rush Cemetery

Frank H. Reid (c. 1844 – July 20, 1898) was an American soldier, teacher, city engineer, vigilante, and one of the combatants in the shootout on Juneau Wharf that ended the life of American outlaw Jefferson "Soapy" Smith, as well as Reid's own life.

== Early life ==
Reid was born in Illinois about 1844. He enlisted in the army and became a lieutenant for a company of Oregon volunteers. In the 1870s, he studied engineering and then became a teacher in Linn County, Oregon, District 29.

== Career ==
During the Klondike Gold Rush, he settled in Skagway, Alaska, where he worked as a bartender at the Klondike saloon, believed to have been owned by Soapy Smith. On August 18, 1897, he was appointed town surveyor and helped map the town of Skagway. At some point, Reid joined the vigilante committee known as the 101.

== Death ==
On the evening of July 8, 1898, he was assigned to guard the entrance of Juneau Wharf, along with Josias Martin Tanner, Jesse Murphy and John Landers, to keep Soapy Smith and his men from entering a meeting being held by the 101 at the opposite end of the wharf. Smith arrived at the scene and assaulted Reid, which started what is historically known as the Shootout on Juneau Wharf. Smith died at the scene, while Reid lay wounded in the hospital for 12 days before dying on July 20, 1898.

== Bibliography ==
- Smith, Jeff (2009). Alias Soapy Smith: The Life and Death of a Scoundrel. Klondike Research. p. 628. ISBN 978-0-9819743-0-9.
