= Bunco =

Dice game

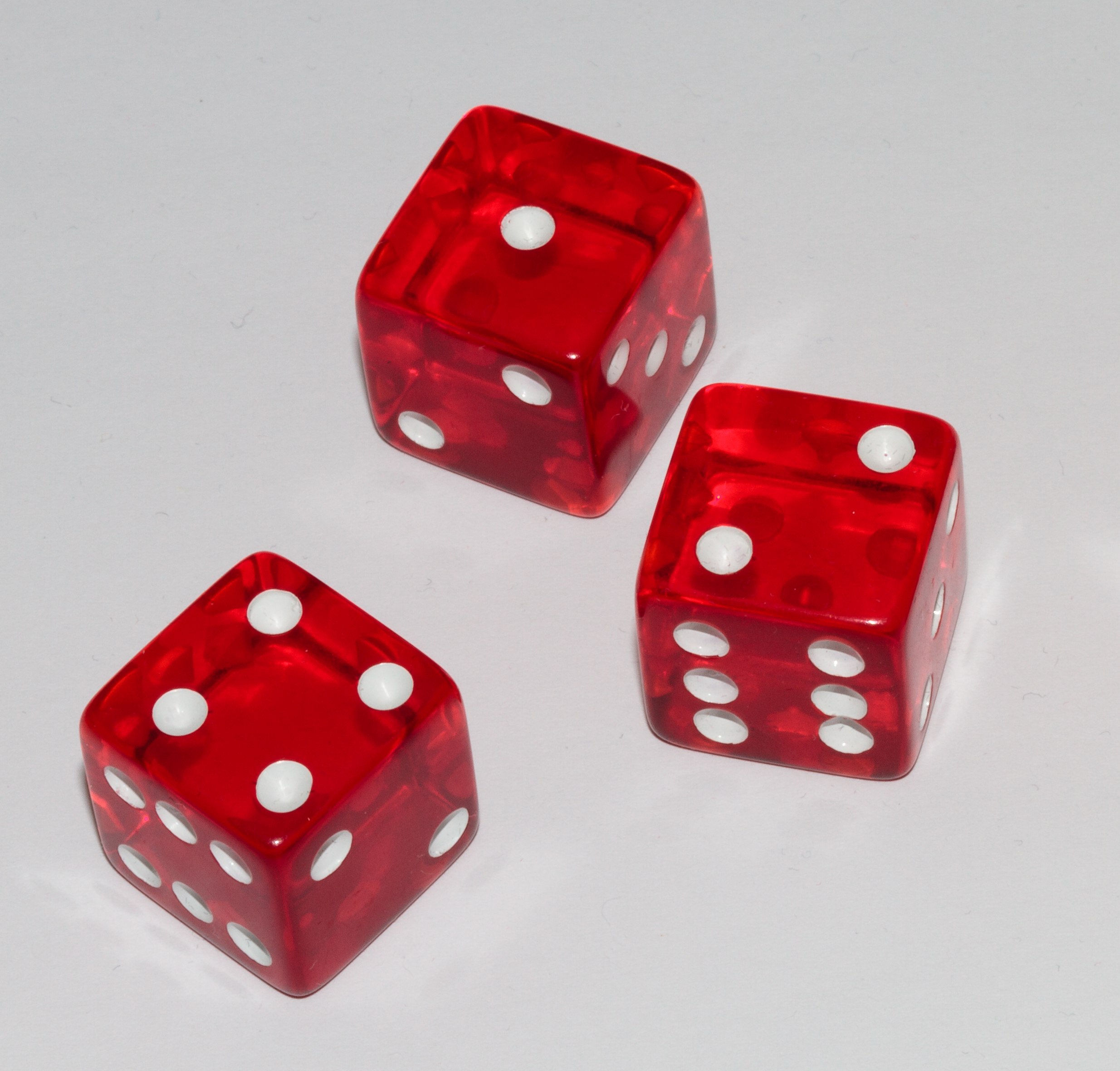
- Genres: Dice rolling
- Players: 2 or more, usually in teams of two
- Setup time: 1–5 minutes
- Playing time: 30 minutes to multiple hours
- Chance: High
- Age range: 4 and up
- Skills: Counting and simple mathematics

Bunco (also bunko or bonko or buncko) is a dice game with twelve or more players, divided into groups of four, trying to score points while taking turns rolling three dice in a series of six rounds. A bunco is achieved when a person rolls three of a kind and all three numbers match the round number which is decided at the beginning of the round.

== History ==
Bunco was originally created as a confidence game similar to three-card monte. It originated in 19th-century England, where it was known as "eight dice cloth". It was imported to San Francisco as a gambling activity in 1855, where it gave its name to gambling parlors, or "bunco parlors", and more generally to any swindle. After the Civil War, the game evolved into a popular parlor game. During the 1920s and Prohibition, bunco was re-popularized as a gambling game, often associated with speakeasies. Law-enforcement groups raiding these parlors came to be known as "bunco squads". Bunco saw a resurgence in popularity as a family game in the 1980s.

According to the World Bunco Association, the game saw a resurgence in popularity in the United States in the early 21st century; in 2006, it was claimed that during the previous year "over 59 million women have played bunco and over 27 million play regularly". Members of bunco clubs often take turns hosting, providing snacks, refreshments and the tables to set up the games. Small amounts of money can be involved as well. Bunco is sometimes referred to as the "housewife's drinking game".

== Rules ==
Each game consists of six rounds, numbered one to six in the order played. Players take turns rolling three dice. One point is awarded for each die rolled that matches the current round number, 5 points are awarded if all three dice match each other, but do not match the current round number, and 21 points if all three dice match the current round number (a "bunco"). If any points are scored, the player gets to roll again, continuing to add to their score. If no points are awarded, the player's turn ends and the dice are passed to the next player at the table. Each round ends when a player has scored 21 points, which makes rolling a bunco an instant win. The game ends when all six rounds are complete. The player with the most rounds won is the overall game winner, with ties typically broken by comparing total points scored.

In larger-scale tournaments, the game will typically be played in teams of two, and multiple tables will play simultaneously, with the highest-ranked table known as the "head table" or "queen's table". After each round, the winning team at a table will move to the next-highest-ranked table while the loser at the head table will move down to the lowest-ranked table.

== World championship ==
The first bunco World Championship was held in 2006; it was broadcast on the Oxygen Network and sponsored by Procter & Gamble's (P&G) anti-heartburn medicine Prilosec OTC, benefiting the National Breast Cancer Foundation. In October 2008, P&G discontinued its association with the Championship after three years.
