= Draken Harald Hårfagre =

Modern longship (launched 2012)

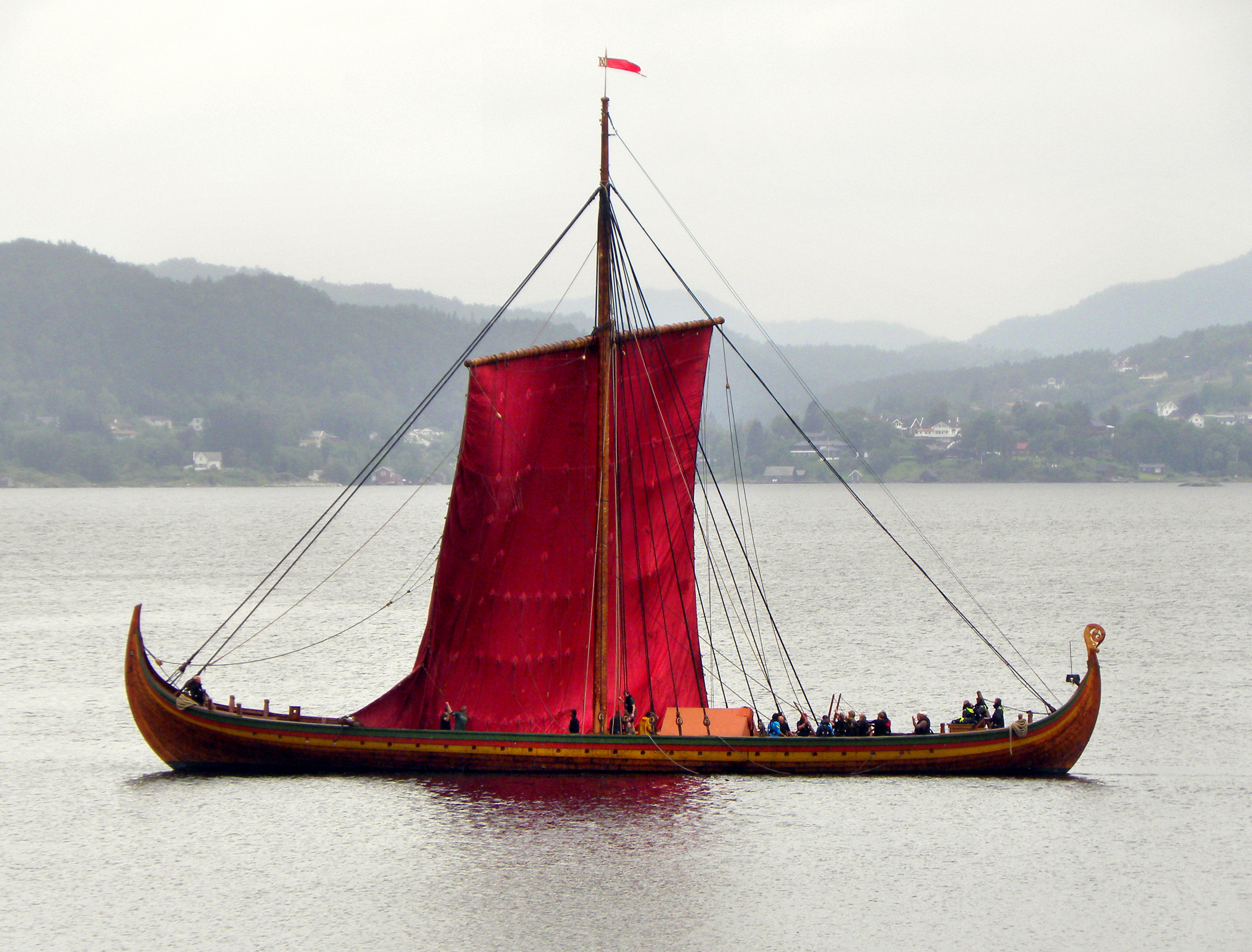

History

Norway
- Name: Draken Harald Hårfagre (English: Dragon Harald Fairhair)
- Namesake: Harald Hårfagre (Harald I of Norway)
- Owner: Sigurd Aase
- Builder: Viking Kings AS
- Laid down: March 2010
- Launched: 5 June 2012
- Identification: MMSI number: 258111550; Callsign: LDFH
- Status: Active

General characteristics
- Type: longship (Skeid)
- Tons burthen: 95.5 metric tons
- Length: 35 m (115 ft)
- Beam: 8 m (26 ft)
- Draught: 2.5 m (8.2 ft)
- Propulsion: 25 pairs of oars; Sail (260 m^{2} (2,800 square feet); Diesel Engine
- Complement: Minimum of 100 under oars; Minimum of 12–14 under sail

Draken Harald Hårfagre (English: Dragon Harald Fairhair) is a large modern designed longship built in the municipality of Haugesund, Norway. It is a ship that combines ocean-crossing sailing capabilities with a medieval warship's use of oars.

== Construction ==
Building began in March 2010. Construction was funded by Sigurd Aase, described as a "Norwegian oil and gas tycoon."

Draken Harald Hårfagre is the largest longship built in modern times. The longest found Viking ship is Roskilde 6 in Denmark while the largest Viking ship in terms of total displacement is assumed to be the Myklebustship in Norway.

=== An oceangoing Norwegian warship ===
The longship is a "25-sesse" (25 pairs of oars); in other words, it is equipped with 50 oars. Each oar is powered by two men, allowing up to 100 men to row simultaneously.

Draken Harald Hårfagre is 35 metres (115 ft) long with a beam of approximately 8 metres (26 ft) and a displacement of about 95 metric tons. The longship is constructed in oak and carries 260 square metres (2,800 sq ft) of sail.

In the Viking age, an attack carried out from the ocean would be in the form of a "strandhögg", i.e., highly mobile hit-and-run tactics. By the High Middle Ages the ships changed shape to become larger and heavier with platforms toward the bow and stern. This was done for the sake of sea battles, making it possible to board ships that lay alongside each other. In the 13th century, this tactic was well known and widely used in Scandinavia. The law of the land in those days (Norwegian: Gulatingsloven) included standards that required Norwegian provinces (fylker) to cooperate in supplying 116 such warships of 50 oars size (Norwegian: 25-sesser, i.e., 25 pairs of oars) for duty in the Norwegian fleet of warships.

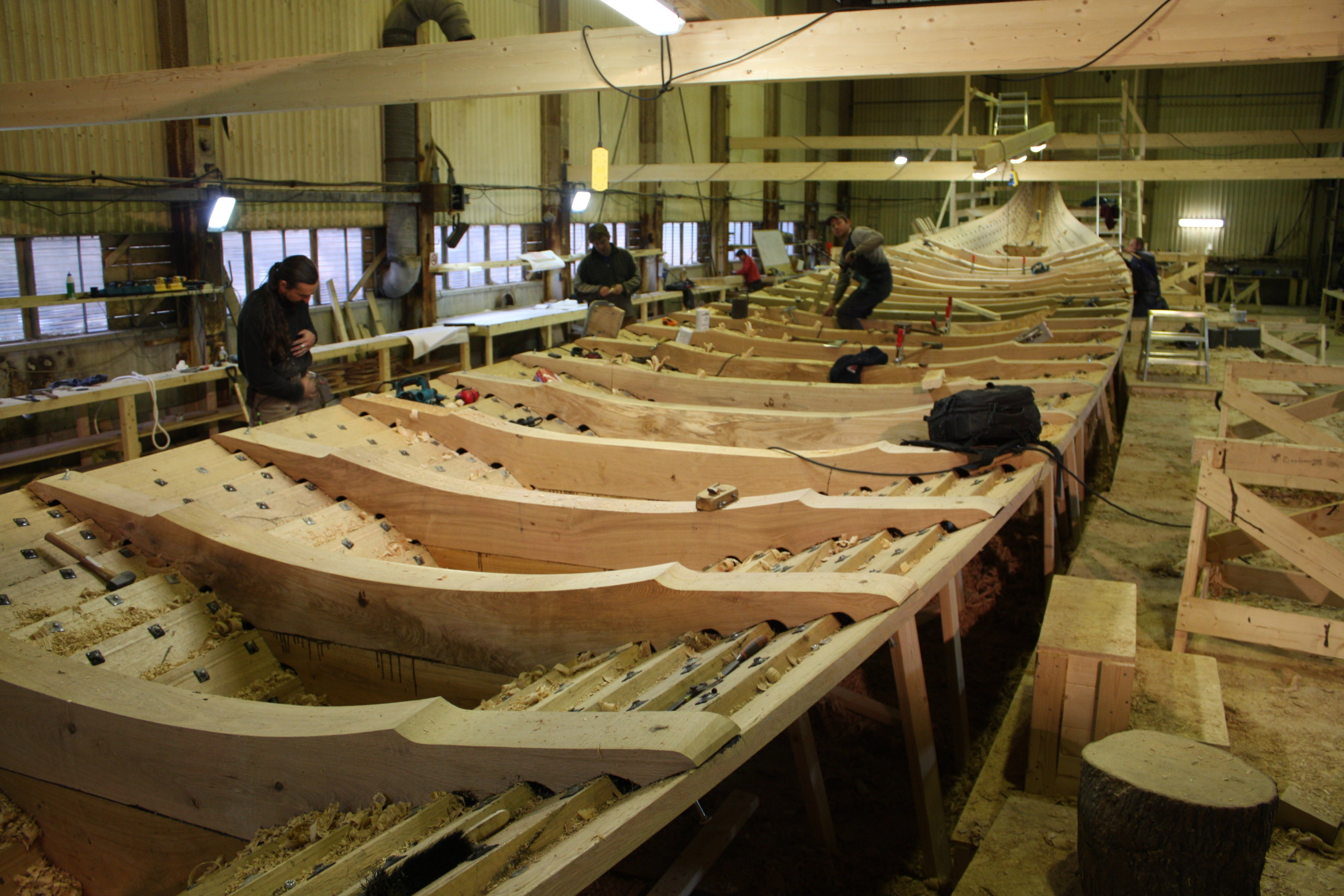
Draken Harald Hårfagre under construction

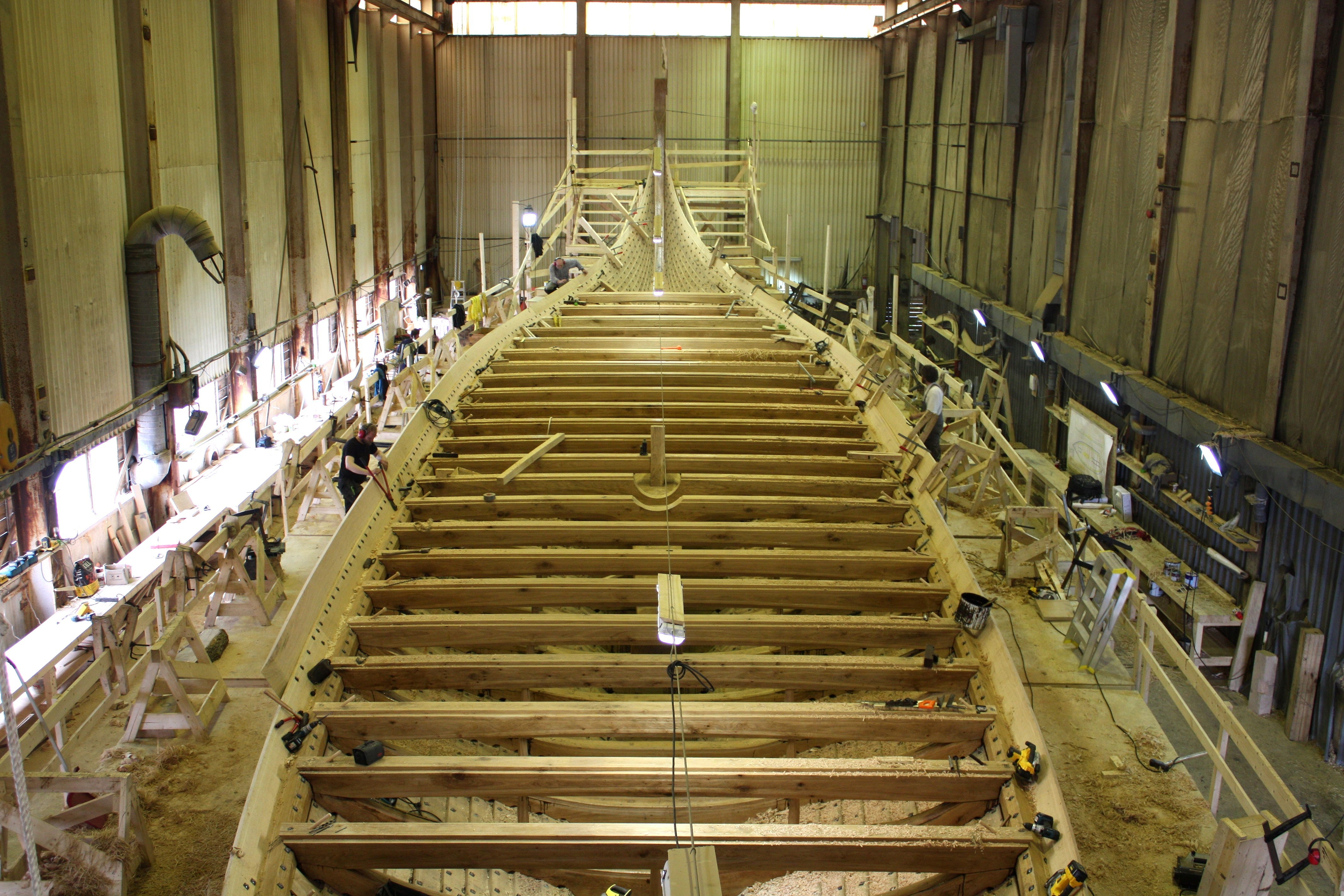
Draken Harald Hårfagre in May 2011, working with 17th strake

=== Norwegian boatbuilding traditions ===
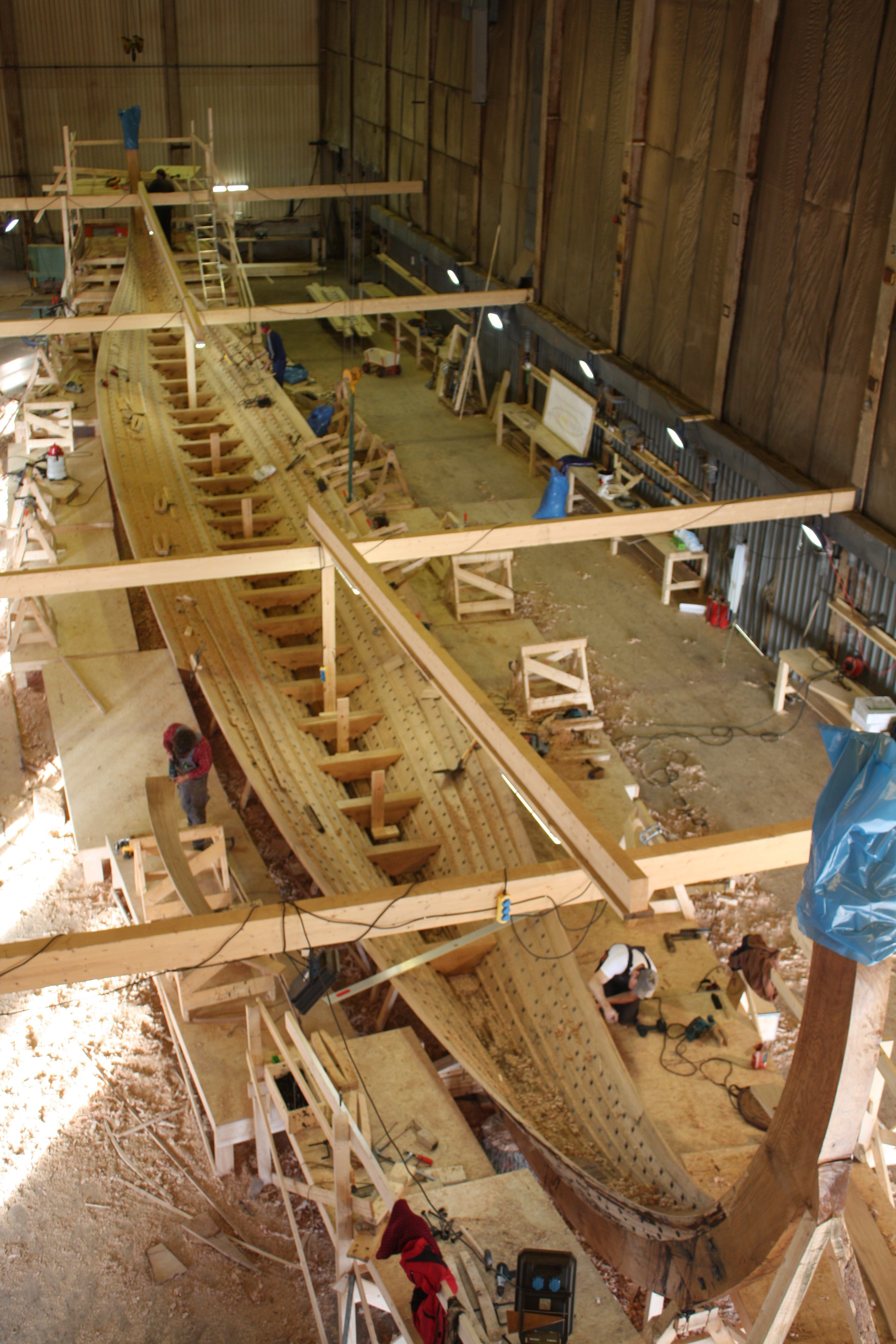
Construction of the 35 m long Skeid longship Draken Harald Hårfagre

Copies of Viking ships are usually based on interpretations of archaeological material, but in the construction of Draken Harald Hårfagre an alternative method was used. It was decided to begin with the living tradition of Norwegian boatbuilding, with roots that can be traced directly to the Viking Age. The foremost Norwegian traditional boat builders are involved in the project. Their knowledge of traditional boatbuilding is supplemented with the results of investigations carried out on archaeological material, source material in Old Norse literature, literature from the same period from foreign sources, iconographic material, etc. The goal of the project is to recreate in this manner an oceangoing warship of 50 oars taken right out of the Norse sagas.

== Criticism ==
Historians have criticized the usage of the term "Viking ship" in connection to Draken. Professor Eldar Heide points out that the ship is not constructed based on any finds from the Viking Age, but rather descriptions in the Norse Sagas that have been viewed as inaccurate since the 1980s.

Draken was supposed to be the longest Viking ship in the world, and have excellent seaworthiness. Ship finds from the end of the Viking Age have a very long, narrow, and low-boarded shape, but such a ship could not sail to America, which was an overarching goal in the Draken project. The boat builders took the Gokstad ship (23. m long) from 890 AD, and scaled it up until it had dimensions that could agree with what Snorri describes. The resulting ship is wide and high-boarded, and thus far removed from the ship designs of the Viking Age.

Rikke Malmros published the article "Leding og skjaldekvad" in 1985, which examined skaldic poems from the Viking Age that been preserved in oral tradition until being written down in the 13th century. She observed that skalds in the Viking Age praised warships for being light and fast – that is, shallow and small or slender. The skaldic stanzas agree with the archaeology, and Draken contradicts both source types.

Draken is not a warship from the Viking Age (small or long, narrow, low-board), and not a cargo ship from the Viking Age (short, wide, high-board). But it is also not a floating fortress from the 13th century, with all the novelty that such ships had. Instead, it is a construction from 2012.

== Launch and maiden voyage ==
The launching of the longship took place in the summer of 2012. The initial period was one of exploring how to sail and row the ship, and for experimentation with the rigging along the coast of Norway.

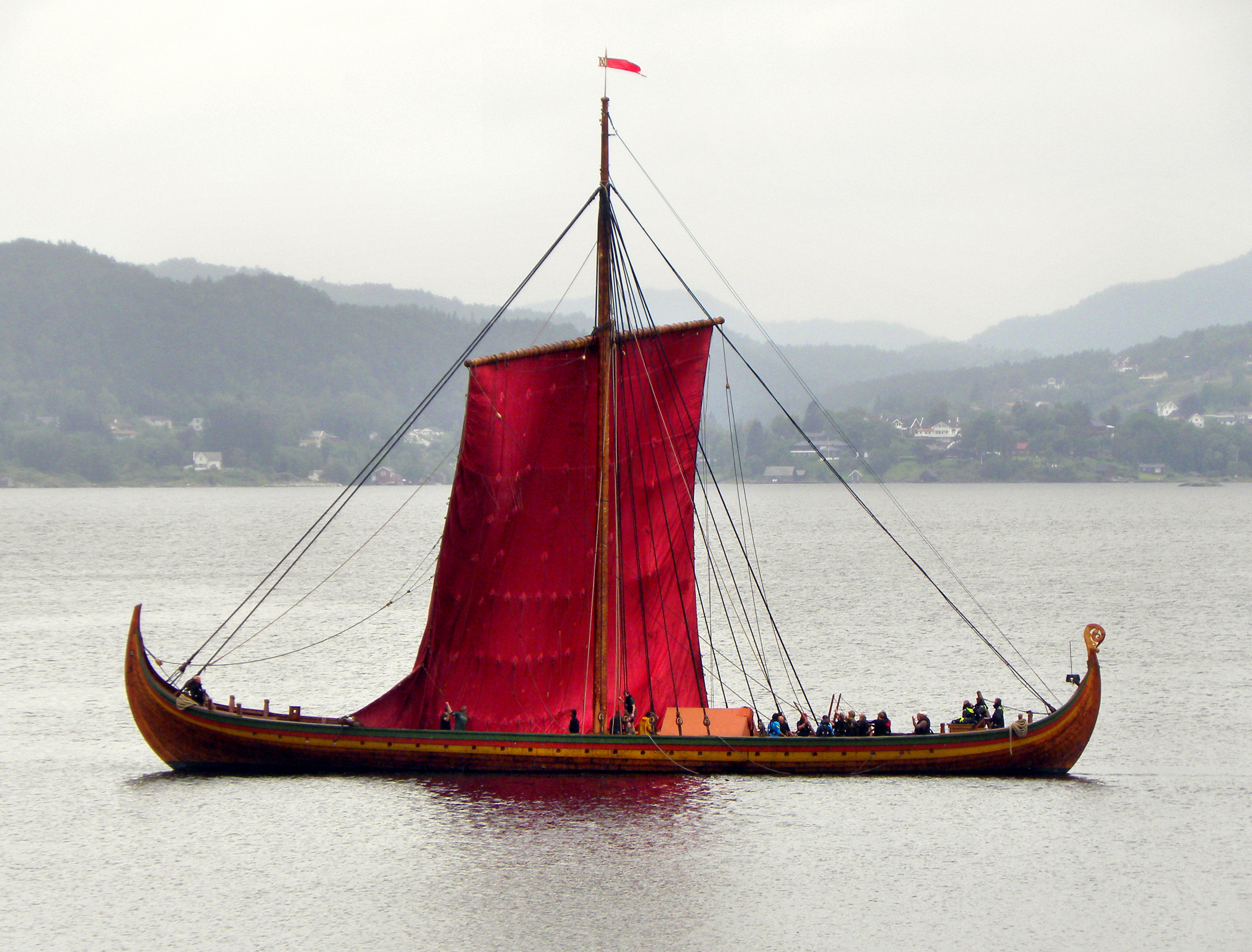
The sail is raised on Draken Harald Hårfagre near Fjellskålnes in Osterfjorden, Norway, in August 2013.

In summer 2014, skippered by Swedish captain Björn Ahlander, the longship made its first real expedition, a three-week passage under sail from Norway to Merseyside, England. There it was hosted by the Liverpool Victoria Rowing Club. It also visited various other locations around the coast of the British Isles, including the Isle of Man, Western Isles, Orkney and Shetland.

== Expedition America 2016 ==
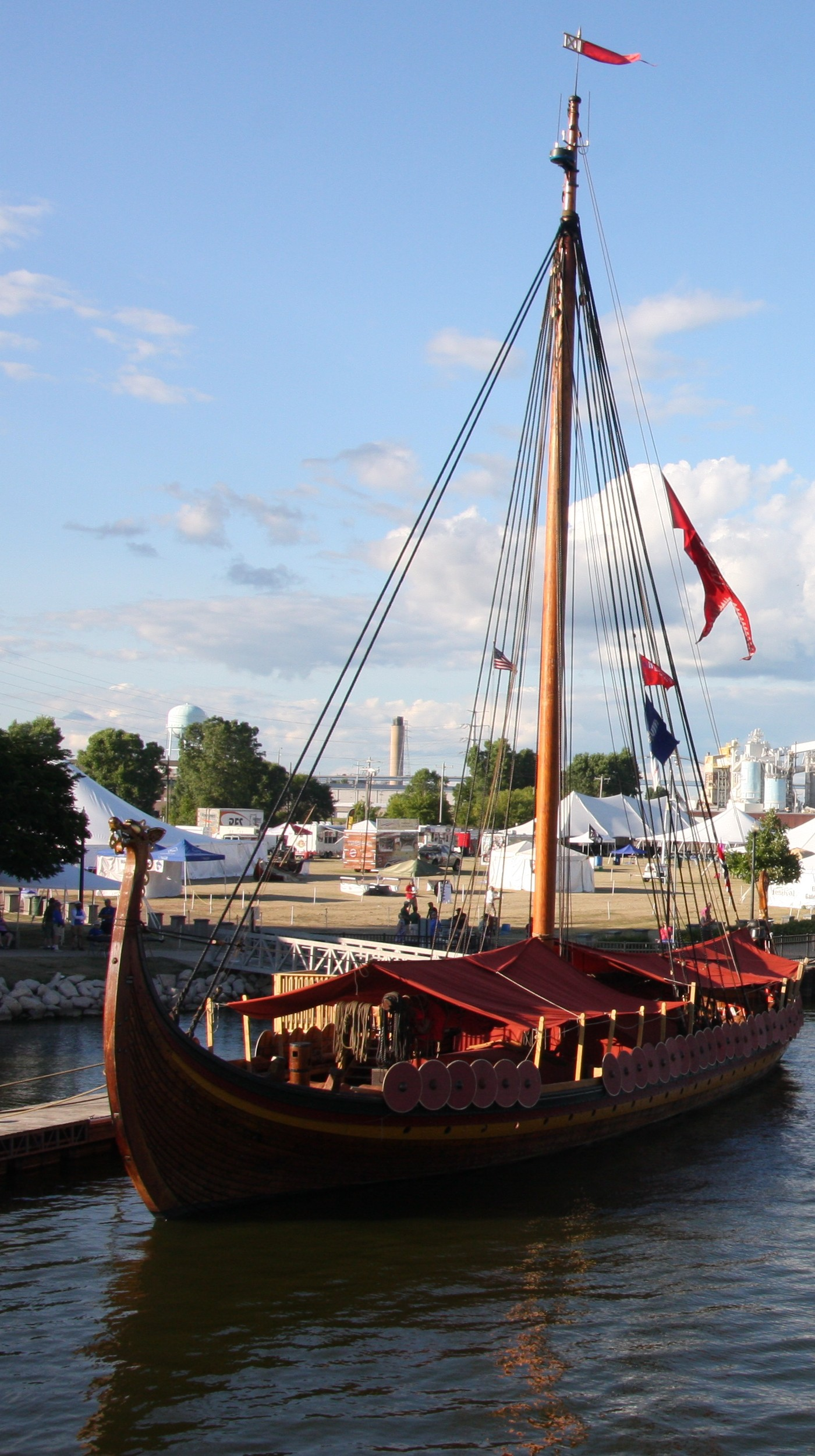
The ship in Green Bay, Wisconsin, the westernmost point of its 2016 expedition

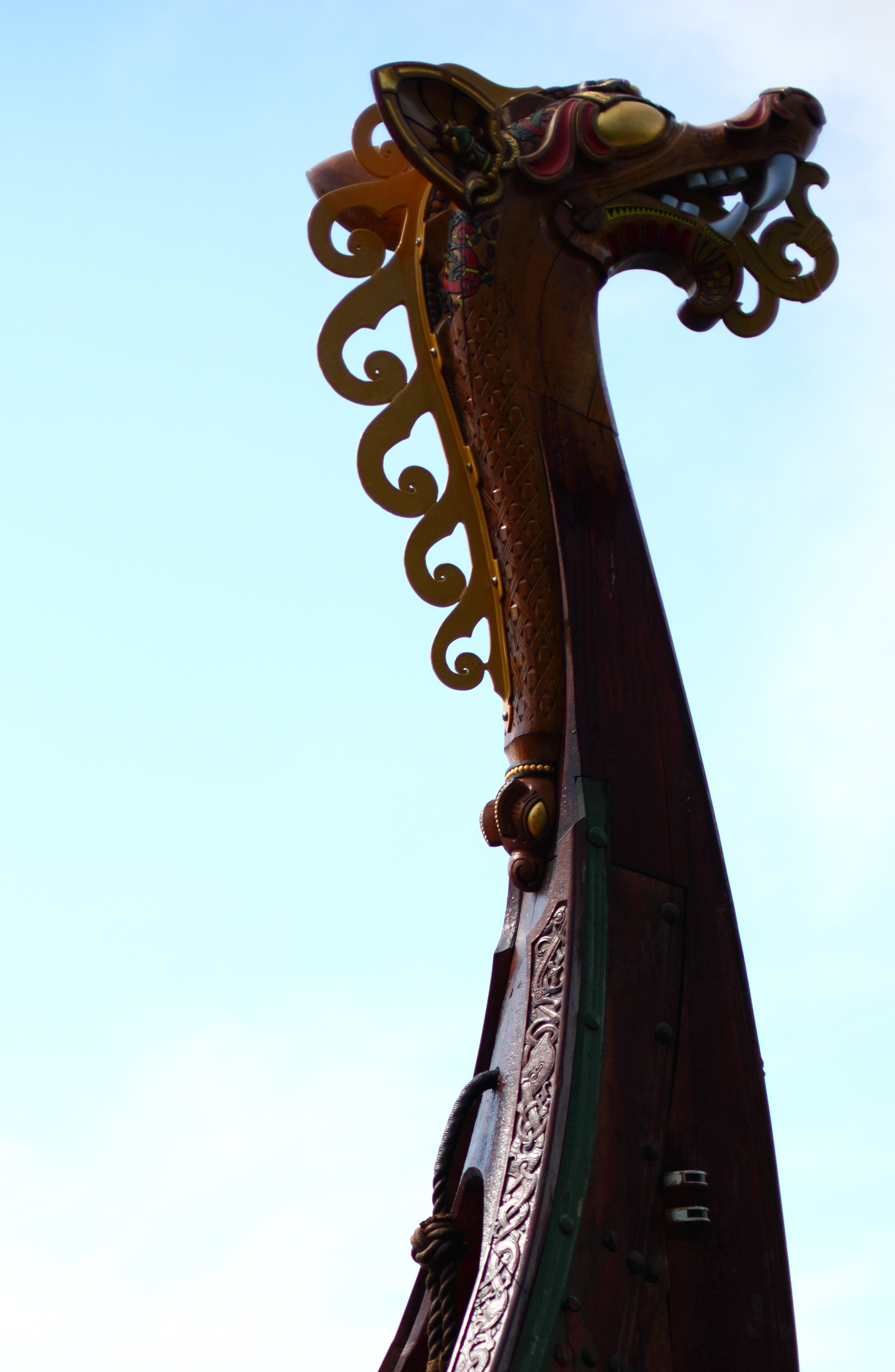
Figurehead of Draken Harald Hårfagre

The ship left its home port of Haugesund, Norway on 26 April 2016, bound for Newfoundland, the aim being to explore and retrace the first transatlantic crossing and the Viking discovery of the New World. The route included stops at the Shetland and Faroe Islands, Iceland, and Greenland, before landfall on Newfoundland was finally achieved on 1 June that year. Future stops were planned along the Atlantic Canadian and American coast.

The schedule of the voyage was:

- 24 April – Haugesund, Norway
- 3 May – Reykjavik, Iceland
- 16 May – Quqortoq, Greenland
- 1 June – St. Anthony, Newfoundland and Labrador*
- 15 June – Quebec City, Quebec*
- 1–3 July – Toronto, Ontario*
- 8 July – Fairport Harbor, Ohio, U.S.*
- 14 July – Bay City, Michigan, U.S.*
- 22 July – Beaver Island. Michigan, U.S.
- 27 July – Chicago, Illinois, U.S.*
- 5 Aug – Green Bay, Wisconsin, U.S.*
- 18 Aug – Duluth, Minnesota, U.S.*
- Sept. (TBD) – Oswego, New York Canals, New York, U.S.*
- 1 Sep – Ilion, New York, U.S.
- 3 Sep – Little Falls, New York, U.S.
- 15 Sep – New York City, U.S.*
- Oct. (TBD) – Mystic Seaport, Connecticut, U.S.*

(*Approximate dates)

In mid-July 2016 doubts were raised about the ship's ability to visit United States destinations in the Great Lakes. The United States Coast Guard deemed it a commercial vessel, requiring a pilot per a 1960 law. The total cost of piloting was estimated at $400,000. Sons of Norway raised over $60,000 to help pay the pilot fees. On 4 August 2016 Viking Kings issued a press release declaring that Green Bay would be the ship's last stop in the Great Lakes, planning to make its next stop in New York in September.

== Awards ==
The crew of Draken Harald Hårfagre were awarded the Leif Erikson Award by The Exploration Museum at the 2016 Explorers Festival in Húsavík, Iceland. Norwegian ambassador Cecilie Landsverk accepted the award on behalf of the crew from Iceland's President Guðni Th. Jóhannesson, followed by a video message from the captain.

== Use in film ==
The ship was used during the production of the film The Odyssey (2026) to portray an ancient Greek warship.
