= National Register of Historic Places listings in Petersburg Borough, Alaska =

Location of Petersburg in Alaska

This is a list of the National Register of Historic Places listings in Petersburg, Alaska.

This is intended to be a complete list of the properties and districts on the National Register of Historic Places in Petersburg, Alaska, United States. The locations of National Register properties and districts for which the latitude and longitude coordinates are included below, may be seen in a Google map.

There are four properties and districts listed on the National Register in the borough, including one National Historic Landmark.

This National Park Service list is complete through NPS recent listings posted September 18, 2026.

== Current listings ==
	Name on the Register	Image	Date listed	Location	City or town	Description
1	Chugach (Ranger Boat)	Chugach (Ranger Boat)	January 21, 1992 (#91001937)	Federal Government Dock, Wrangell Narrows; 56°48′33″N 132°58′21″W	Petersburg	
2	F/V Charles W		February 6, 2006 (#05000285)	Middle Harbor, Float 2, Slip 299; 56°48′41″N 132°57′45″W	Petersburg	
3	Five Finger Light Station	Five Finger Light Station	May 12, 2004 (#04000416)	The Five Fingers southernmost island, approximately 41 miles (66 km) northwest of Petersburg; 57°16′13″N 133°37′54″W	Petersburg	
4	Sons of Norway Hall	Sons of Norway Hall	July 10, 1979 (#79003765)	10 Sing Lee Alley; 56°48′38″N 132°57′33″W	Petersburg	

== See also ==
- List of National Historic Landmarks in Alaska
- National Register of Historic Places listings in Alaska
