= Charles W =

Historic fishing schooner

- F/V Charles W (Schooner)
- U.S. National Register of Historic Places
- Alaska Heritage Resources Survey
- Location within Alaska
- Location: Middle Harbor, Float 2, Slip 299, Petersburg, Alaska
- Coordinates: 56°48′41″N 132°57′45″W
- Area: less than one acre
- Built: 1925
- Built by: Larsen, Dockton, Washington
- Architectural style: Schooner rigged beam trawler
- NRHP reference No.: 05000285
- AHRS No.: PET-00529
- Added to NRHP: February 6, 2006

The F/V Charles W, also known as Annie J Larsen, is a historic fishing schooner anchored in Petersburg, Alaska. At the time of its retirement in 2000, it was the oldest fishing vessel in the fishing fleet of Southeast Alaska, and the only known wooden fishing vessel in the entire state still in active service. Launched in 1907, she was first used in the halibut fisheries of Puget Sound and the Bering Sea as the Annie J Larsen. In 1925 she was purchased by the Alaska Glacier Seafood Company, refitted for shrimp trawling, and renamed Charles W in honor of owner Karl Sifferman's father. The company was one of the pioneers of the local shrimp fishery, a business it began to phase out due to increasing competition in the 1970s. The Charles W was the last of the company's fleet of ships, which numbered twelve at its height. The boat was acquired in 2002 by the nonprofit Friends of the Charles W.

The boat was listed on the National Register of Historic Places in 2006.

== See also ==
- National Register of Historic Places listings in Petersburg Census Area, Alaska
