= National Register of Historic Places listings in Yakutat, Alaska =

Location of Yakutat in Alaska

This is a list of the National Register of Historic Places listings in Yakutat, Alaska.

This is intended to be a complete list of the properties and districts on the National Register of Historic Places in Yakutat, Alaska, United States. The locations of National Register properties and districts for which the latitude and longitude coordinates are included below, may be seen in a Google map.

There is one property listed on the National Register in the city and borough, which is also a National Historic Landmark.

This National Park Service list is complete through NPS recent listings posted October 16, 2026.

== Current listings ==
	Name on the Register	Image	Date listed	Location	City or town	Description
1	New Russia Site		February 23, 1972 (#72001593)	South of Kardy Lake, about 3.5 miles (5.6 km) southwest of Yakutat; 59°31′37″N 139°49′36″W	Yakutat	

== See also ==
- List of National Historic Landmarks in Alaska
- National Register of Historic Places listings in Alaska
