= Klondike Gold Rush National Historical Park =

US national park

- IUCN category III (natural monument or feature)
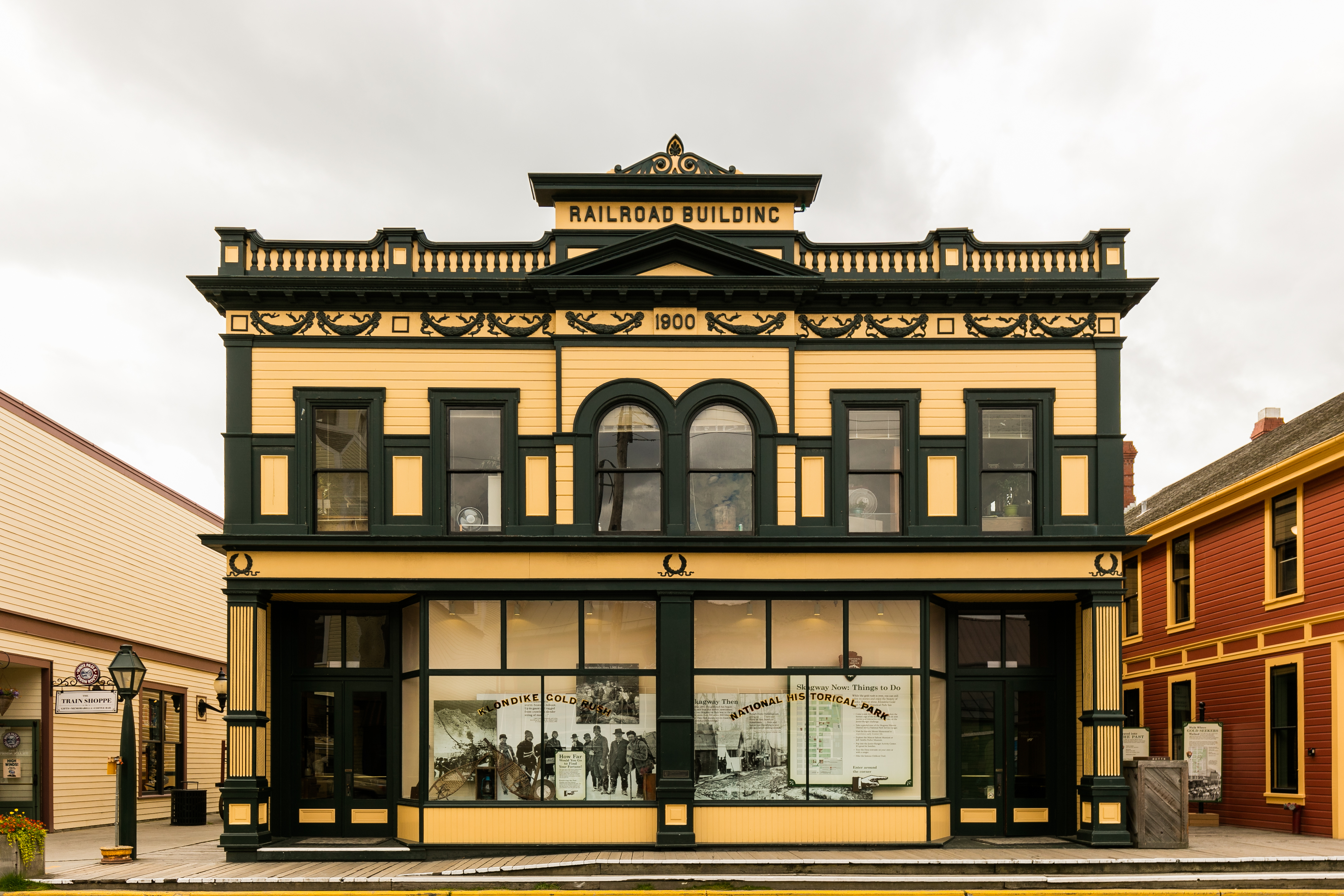
- White Pass & Yukon Route Railway Administration Building serves as a museum

- Location within Alaska
- Location: Alaska and Washington, United States
- Nearest city: Skagway, Alaska and Seattle, Washington
- Coordinates: 59°34′31″N 135°15′49″W
- Area: 12,996 acres (52.59 km^{2})
- Established: June 30, 1976
- Visitors: 1,489,935 (in 2025)
- Governing body: National Park Service
- Website: Klondike Gold Rush National Historical Park
- Klondike Goldrush National Historical Park
- U.S. National Register of Historic Places
- U.S. Historic district
- Alaska Heritage Resources Survey
- Location: Union of Chilkoot Trail and Dyea Site and Skagway Historic District and White Pass
- NRHP reference No.: 76002189
- AHRS No.: SKG-086
- Added to NRHP: June 30, 1976

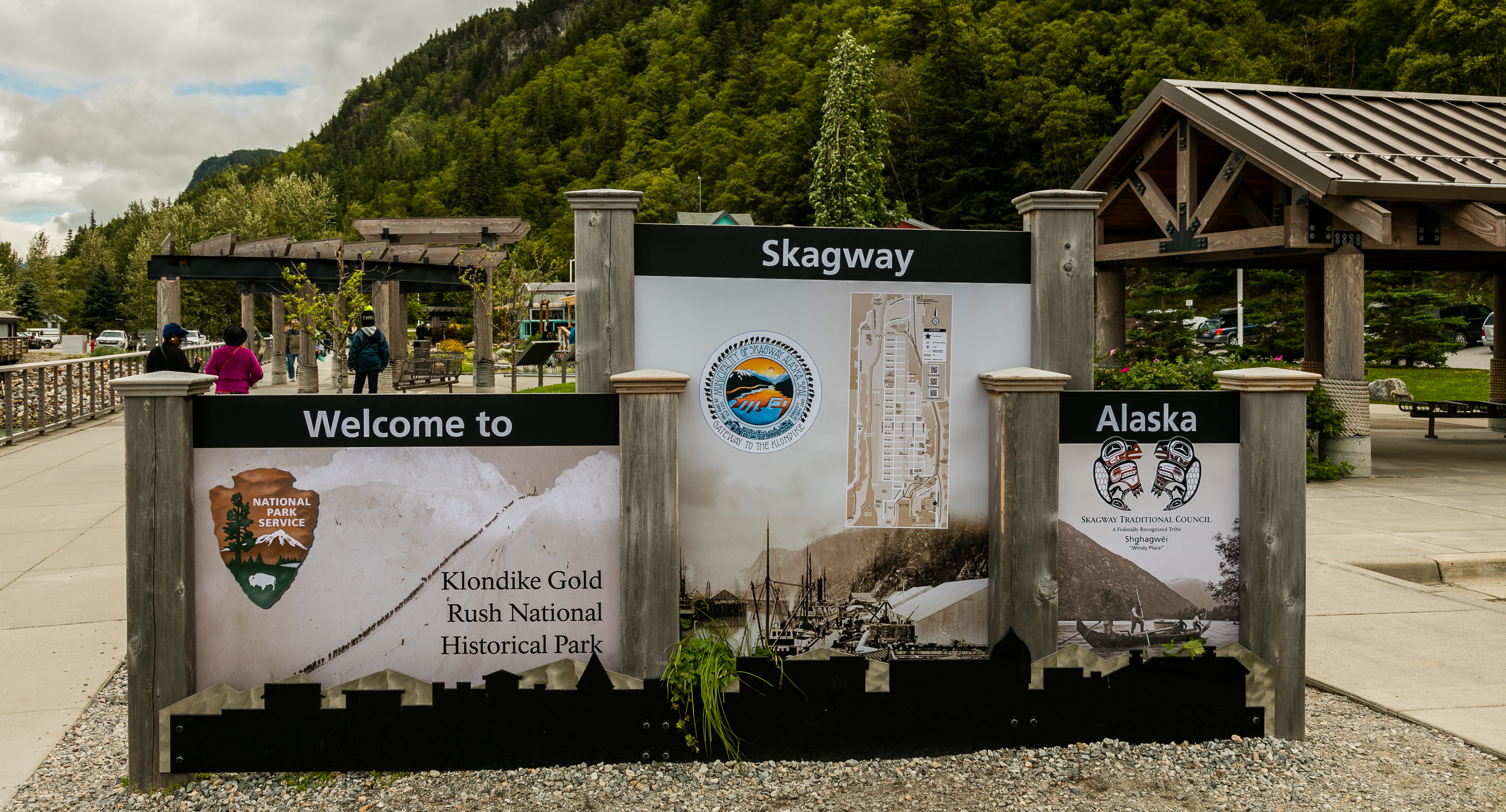
Welcome sign

Klondike Gold Rush National Historical Park is a national historical park operated by the United States National Park Service that seeks to commemorate the Klondike Gold Rush of the late 1890s. Though the gold fields that were the ultimate goal of the stampeders lay in Yukon, Canada, the park comprises staging areas for the trek there and the routes leading in its direction. There are four units, including three in Municipality of Skagway Borough, Alaska and a fourth in the Pioneer Square National Historic District in Seattle, Washington.

A fuller appreciation of the story of the Klondike Gold Rush requires exploration and discovery on both sides of the Canada–United States border. National historic sites in Whitehorse and Dawson City, Yukon, as well as in British Columbia, complete the story. In 1998, Klondike Gold Rush National Historical Park joined with Chilkoot Trail National Historic Site, Dawson Historical Complex National Historic Site, and "The Thirty Mile" stretch of the Yukon River to create Klondike Gold Rush International Historical Park, allowing for an integrated binational experience.

== Historic Skagway ==
NPS and other buildings in the Skagway Historic District

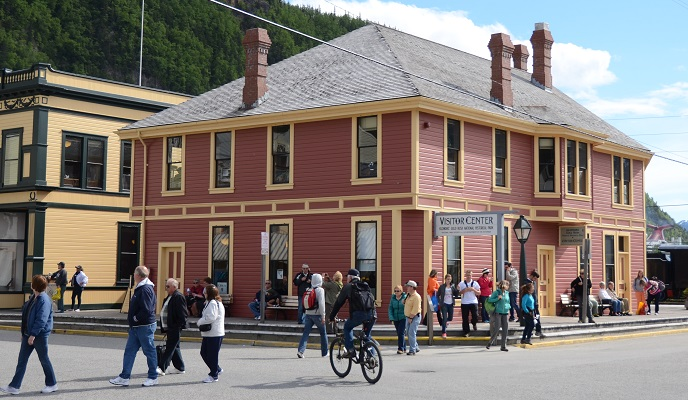
The old depot now functions as the NPS Visitors Center

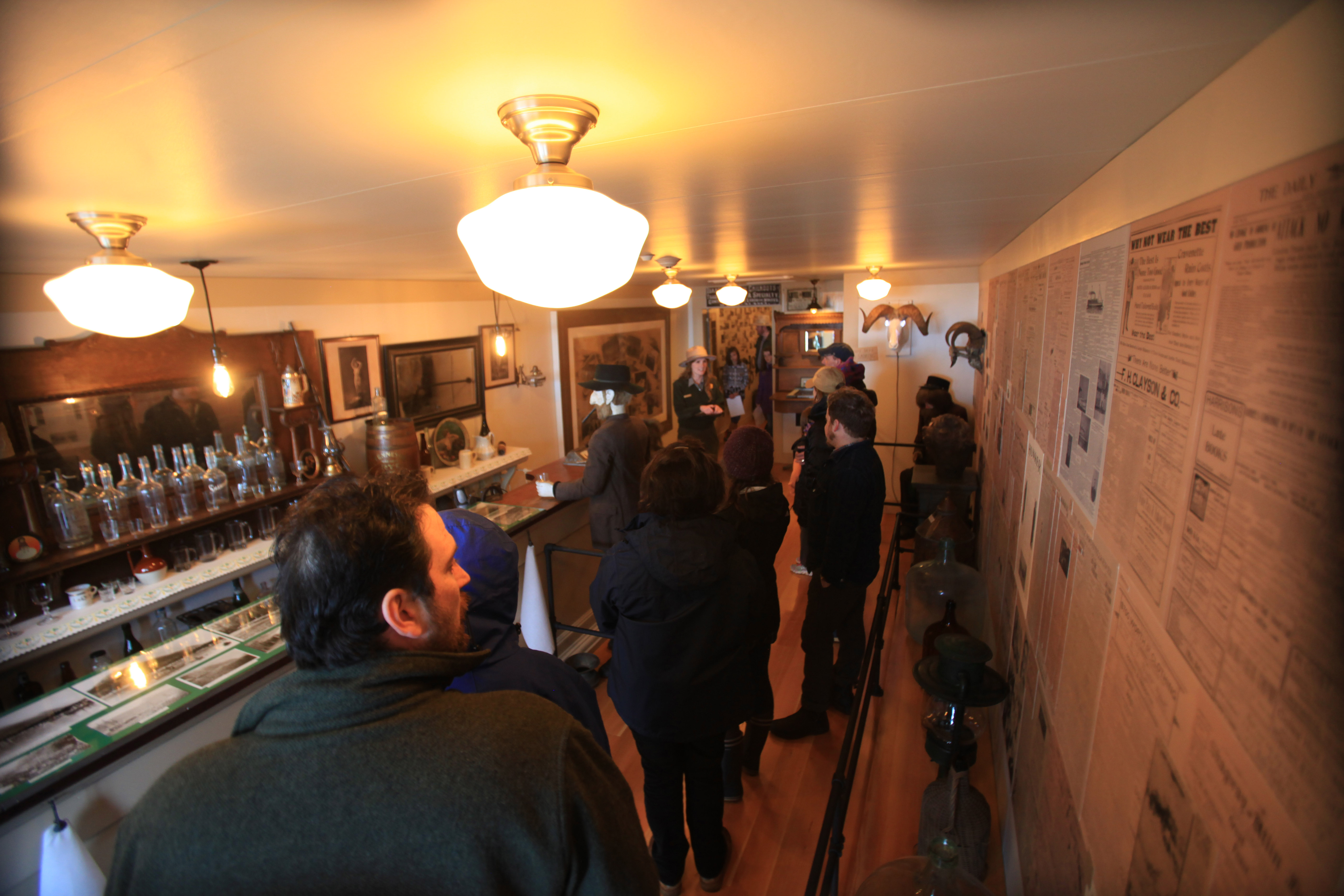
Visitors on a ranger-guided tour of Jeff. Smith's Parlor Museum opened in April 2016

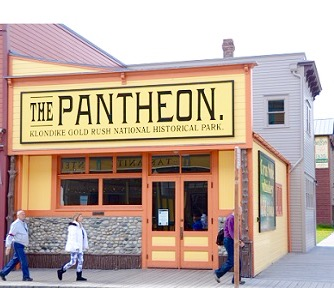
Younger visitors can earn their Junior Ranger badge at the restored Pantheon

The Skagway unit includes much of the historic downtown such as buildings owned and restored by NPS and others, some leased for commercial purposes to recreate the city's activity. The visitor center in Skagway is located in railroad depot building at Second and Broadway and is a place to begin tours either led by a ranger or self-guided. Junior rangers can plan their activities further and earn their badges further up Broadway at the Pantheon Saloon.

- White Pass & Yukon Route Railway Broadway Depot. Corner of 2nd Avenue and Broadway. Now serving as the park's Visitors Center and Headquarters, the depot was the first building the railway built for this purpose, completed in December 1898. The structure served this purpose at least until the 1950s. However, together with the adjoining administration building and the railway itself, these were taken over by the U.S. Army Railway Operating Battalion from 1942 to 1946 to supply construction of the Alaska Highway, the first land route to Alaska, then under construction in adjoining British Columbia and Yukon Territory as part of the war effort. It was the only commercial railway in the United States taken over for this purpose. The building was transferred to NPS in 1976 with restoration completed in 1984, returning its appearance to the 1908-1915 time period.
- White Pass & Yukon Route Railway Administration Building. 2nd Avenue, east of Broadway. The bottom floor houses the park museum while additional park offices are located upstairs. Located next to the depot, the Daily Alaskan noted during the year of its completion in its May 3, 1900 edition that it the railway's headquarters was "by far the finest wooden structure in the city". As with the depot, it was vacated in 1969, transferred to NPS in 1976, with restoration completed in 1984.
- Martin Itjen's House. Broadway between 1st Avenue and 2nd Avenue. The building serves as the NPS and Parks Canada Trail Center, and is one of the first structures visitors to the park arriving by ship see. Originally it stood on piers by the wharf, completed in 1902, and is reminiscent of homes built for railway employees. In 1922, it was sold to Martin Itjen who had learned to profit from the summer tourist trade by greeting passers-by and selling tours of the town's attractions. Relocation of railway tracks in 1946 isolated the house, which after two intermediate moves ended up on Sixth. NPS acquired the structure in 1978, moving it to its current position 300 feet (92 m) west of its original location. Restoration was completed in 1991 to return the home to the 1921-1941 period.
- Jeff. Smith's Parlor. 2nd Avenue west of Broadway. The building was most famously used as a base of operations by con man and outlaw Jefferson "Soapy" Smith who ended up in Alaska by way of Denver. He and his gang defrauded and tricked miners for only three months before Smith was shot to death in spectacular fashion on the Skagway wharf. Martin Itjen bought the saloon in 1922, and outfitted it as a museum with animatronic figures of Soapy Smith and his associates. Even after selling it in 1950, the museum remained in operation until 1986. Donated to NPS in 2007, the building was refurbished to its old glory as it would have been seen by visitors back in 1967, and reopened in April 2016.
- Verbauwhede's Cigar Store, Confectionery, and Cribs. Broadway between 2nd Avenue and 3rd Avenue. Frederick Verbauwhede originally opened a store selling cigars and confections here in 1898, and in 1902 moved one-story "cribs" behind the store from their previous location between Fourth and Fifth where they housed prostitutes. A gunsmith, jeweler, gas station and travel agency occupied the premises at one time or another through 1977 when NPS purchased the buildings. Restored in 1986, the cigar store is leased to a private business while the cribs are used by the park's law enforcement operations.
- Boas Tailor & Furrier Shop. Broadway between 2nd Avenue and 3rd Avenue. As the name implies, it was formerly, though briefly, a furrier, topped by a traditional high wooden false front as seen in other western towns in the United States and Canada. After a series of other business, it was sold to NPS in 1978 with period restoration completed in 1986. It is now leased to private business to encourage a feeling of Skagway as a center of bustling business activity.
- Pacific Clipper Line Office. Broadway near 3rd Avenue. First serving the considerable steamship trade that brought passengers to Skagway that lack other means of access, the building later became a liquor store before Skagway was hit by municipal prohibition in 1916 and other uses were found for it. NPS acquired the building in 1976, and after restoration began leasing it to private business in 1990.
- Mascot Saloon. Corner of Broadway and 3rd Avenue. The saloon opened in 1898 and unlike few others survived as bar through prohibition in Skagway in 1916. After that it was used as a drugstore and for other purposes until it was transferred to NPS in 1976. It was restored to its post-rush period appearance and reopened as an exhibit in 1990.
- Lynch and Kennedy Dry Goods Store. Broadway between 3rd Avenue and 4th Avenue. Originally built in 1900 as barracks for the all-black Company L 24th Infantry. The building was moved from Sixth to Broadway and a false front was added in order to open a haberdashery and dry goods store in the location in September 1908. The Daily Alaskan described the store as "just about the most handsomest in the city". All the same it closed by 1920, and thereafter served variously as a restaurant and again as barracks before being purchased by NPS in 1977. Restoration was completed in 1990, returning it to the 1908-1915 time period. It is leased to a private business.
- Pantheon Saloon. Corner of Broadway and 4th Avenue. Though a hardware store in 1898, the Pantheon became a saloon in 1903 and stayed in business until municipal prohibition in 1916. It served varied functions before being sold to NPS in 1977. Now restored to its 1903-1916 appearance, the Pantheon invites in young visitors to explore the park and earn their Junior Ranger patches.

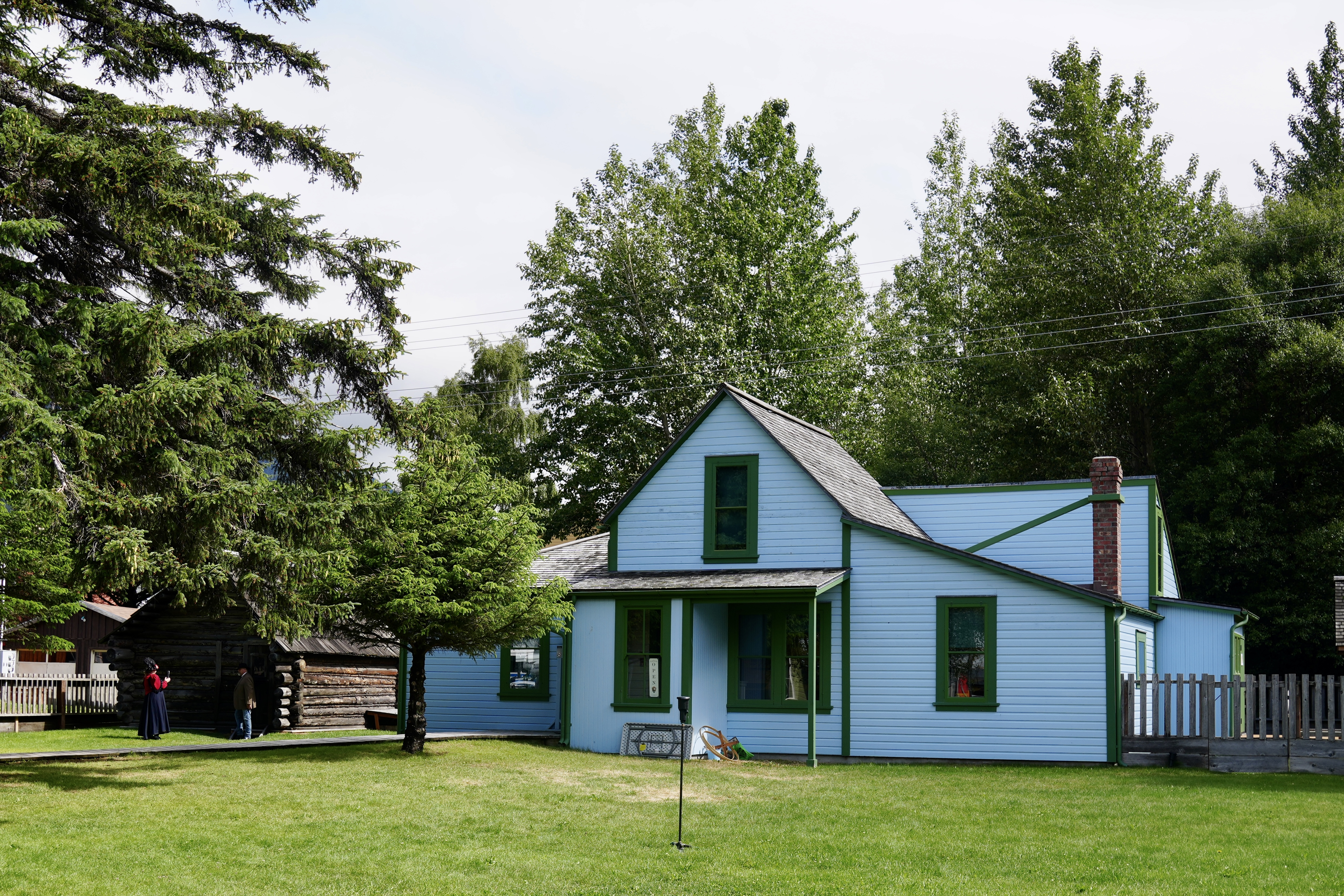
J, Bernard Moore House 1897 Restored by the National Park Service Klondike Gold Rush National Historical Park

- Moore Homestead. Between 5th Avenue and 6th Avenue, east of Broadway. The first homestead in Skagway, which predates the gold rush era.
- Peniel Mission. Eastern end of 6th Avenue. Originally a Christian mission, now used as modest housing for the park's seasonal employees.

== White Pass Trail ==
The park includes as one of its units the White Pass Trail. White Pass is a mountain pass that leads from Skagway to the headwaters of the Yukon River in British Columbia. The trail was one of the two main routes used by prospectors to get from Skagway over the Boundary Range on their way to the gold fields in the Yukon. The White Pass and Yukon Route railway, completed in 1900, used White Pass to bring prospectors from Skagway to Whitehorse, Yukon.

== Dyea Townsite and Chilkoot Trail ==
The historic townsite of Dyea is also part of the historical park, from which the Chilkoot Trail leaves and runs to Bennett Lake in British Columbia. From there, prospectors generally rafted to Dawson City, Yukon. The trail center in Skagway, operated by both the National Park Service and Parks Canada, has information regarding current conditions along the Chilkoot Trail as it travels through both countries. A permit is required to hike the 33-mile (53-kilometer) trail.

== Seattle unit ==
Buildings of Seattle unit

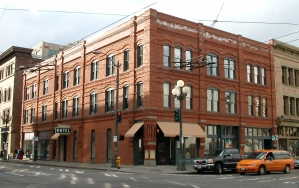
The park's Seattle Visitor Center at the Cadillac Hotel

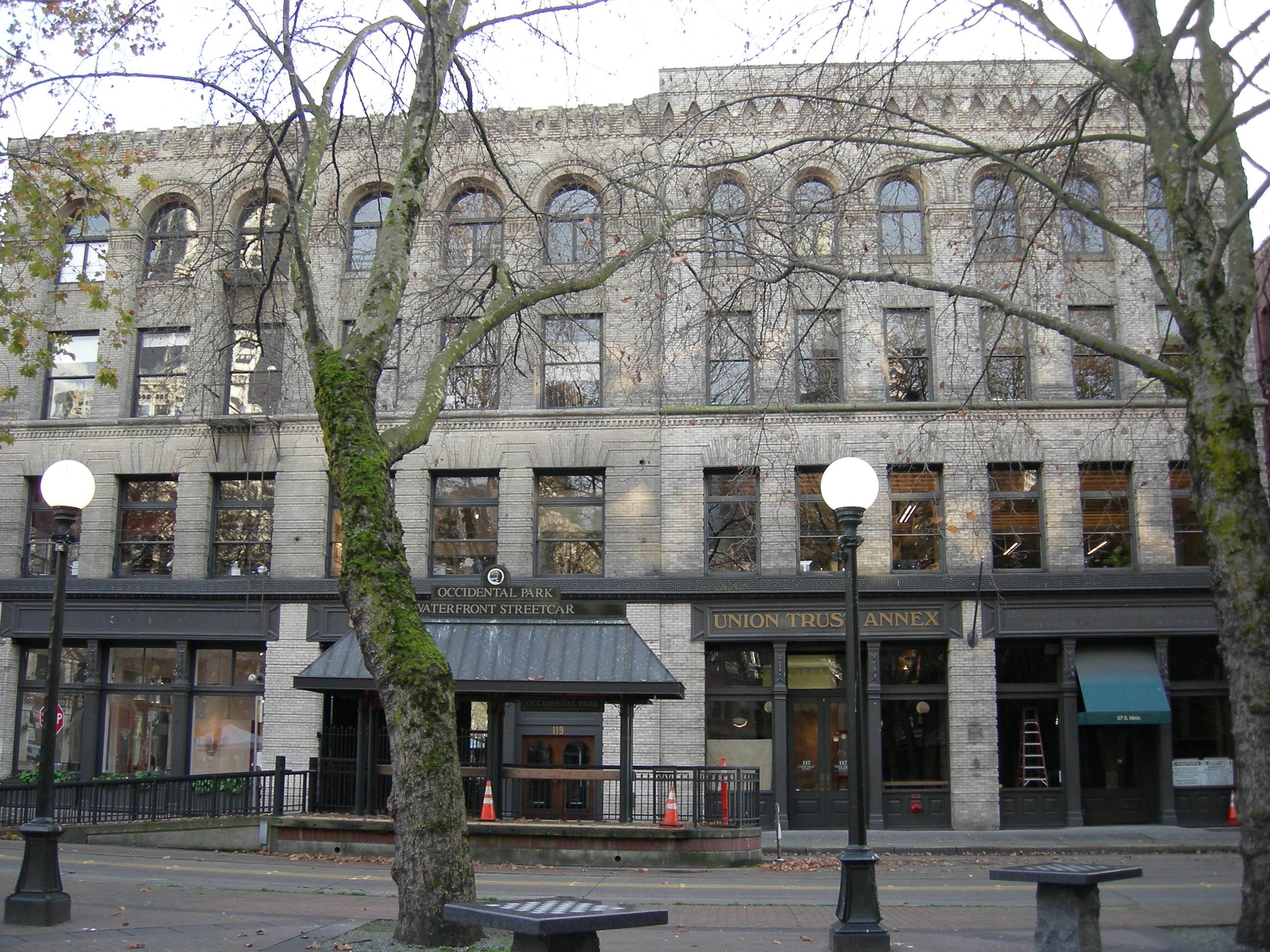
Prior location of the Visitor Center in the Union Trust Annex (at right)

The Pioneer Square Historic District has several buildings dating to the 1880s and 1890s. The Cadillac Hotel (built 1890) at 319 Second Avenue South was a major point of outfitting and departure during the gold rush stampede. Severely damaged in the 2001 Nisqually earthquake, it was rehabilitated in 2004–2005 as home to the interpretive center and museum for the Seattle unit of the park, and was opened and dedicated on June 26, 2006.

The Seattle unit's visitor center originally opened June 2, 1979 in the Union Trust Annex (built 1902), across Main Street from Occidental Park. Other historic buildings include the Pioneer Building (1892), Schwabacher Building (1890), Grand Central Hotel (1889), and Metropole Building (1895).

The National Park Travelers Club held its 2014 convention at Klondike Gold Rush.

== International Park ==
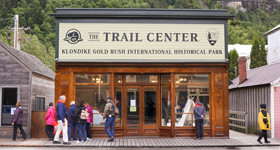
Formerly Boss Bakery, Chilikoot Trail hikers should pick up their permits here, at 520 Broadway in Skagway, and register for Customs, at a Trail Center jointly staffed by National Park Service and Parks Canada personnel

In 1969, the United States and Canadian governments jointly declared their intention to make Chilkoot Trail a component of a Klondike Gold Rush International Historic Park. The U.S. portion was eventually established in 1976 as part of Klondike Gold Rush National Historical Park.

The Canadian portion of the trail became Chilkoot Trail National Historic Site, one of several sites in the national park system associated with the Klondike. But it was not until the centennial of the gold rush, in 1998, that the dream of an international park was realized, when Klondike Gold Rush National Historical Park and Chilkoot Trail National Historic Site were declared to constitute jointly the Klondike Gold Rush International Historical Park. Their previous legal names were retained, while the new name reflected co-operative management between the two park services, and the formalization of relations which had in fact been going on for years.

Beyond this, joint resolutions recognize the relevance to gold rush interpretation of the Dawson Historical Complex National Historic Site, in Dawson City, Yukon, which includes significant buildings. Parks Canada identifies Dawson City as a unit of the international park, as well as "The Thirty Mile" section of the Yukon River, a national heritage river from Lake Laberge to the Teslin River. The river has been recognized by both countries as part of their joint interpretative efforts.

Beyond the formal international historical park are national historic sites in Yukon concerned with the gold rush:

- Discovery Claim National Historic Site (NHS)
- SS Keno NHS
- Dredge No. 4 NHS
- SS Klondike NHS
- Yukon Hotel NHS
- Canadian Bank of Commerce NHS
- Former Territorial Court House NHS
- Old Territorial Administration Building NHS

== See also ==
- National Register of Historic Places listings in Skagway, Alaska
