= MV Chugach Ranger =

- Chugach (Ranger Boat)
- U.S. National Register of Historic Places
- Alaska Heritage Resources Survey
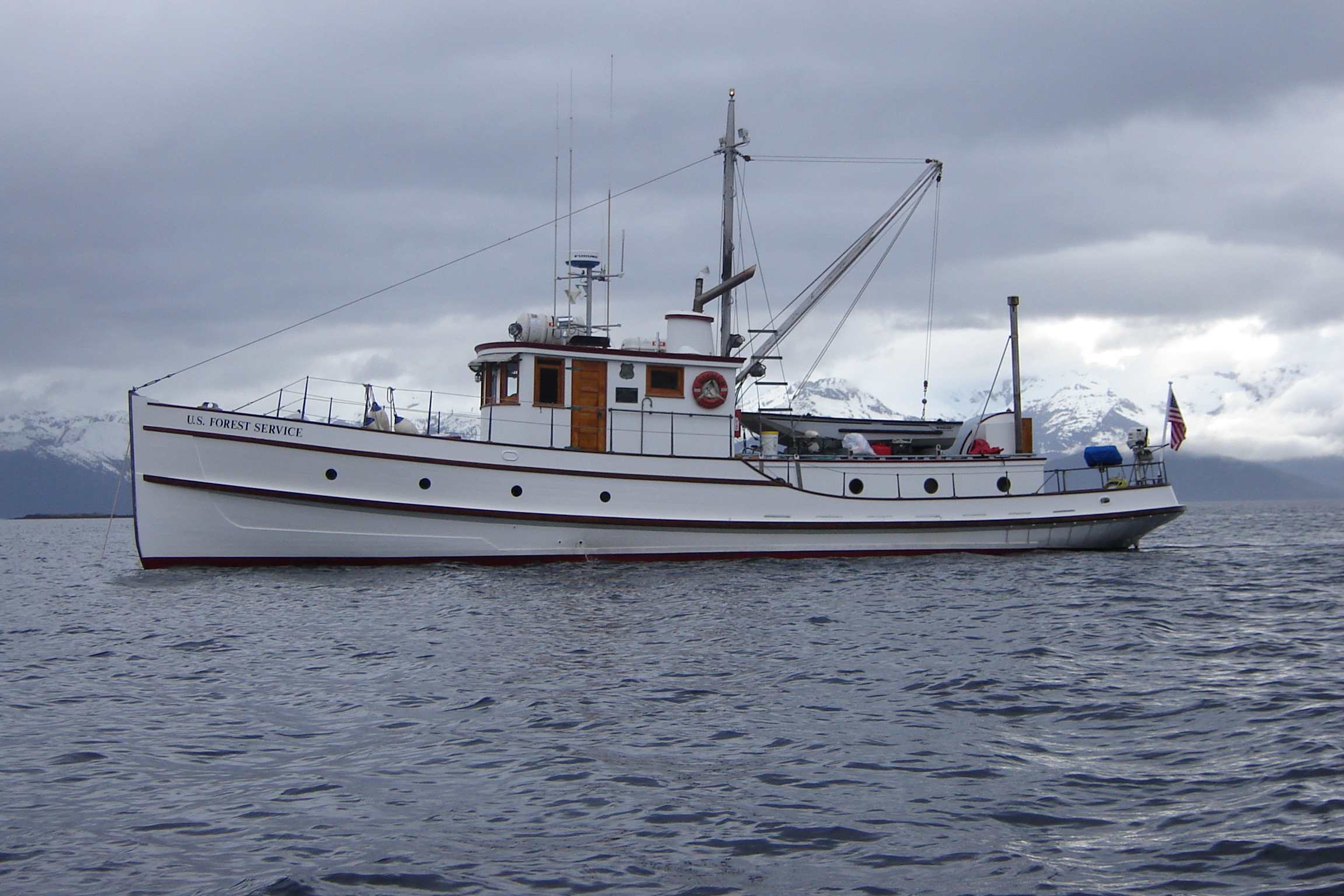
- Chugach in 2006

- Location within Alaska
- Location: Federal Government Dock, Wrangell Narrows, Petersburg, Alaska
- Coordinates: 56°48′33″N 132°58′21″W
- Area: less than one acre
- Built: 1926
- Built by: Lake Union Drydock & Machine Works
- Architect: L.H. Coolidge
- Architectural style: Wooden motor vessel
- NRHP reference No.: 91001937
- AHRS No.: PET-200
- Added to NRHP: January 21, 1992

The MV Chugach Ranger is a historic ranger boat whose home port is Petersburg, Alaska. She is the last wooden ranger boat in the fleet of the United States Forest Service operating in Southeast Alaska. She was designed by Seattle-based boat designer L. H. Coolidge and launched in Seattle in 1925. She has been in service ever since, transporting scientists, government officials, supplies, and guests throughout the areas administered by the Forest Service in southeastern Alaska, and performing search and rescue operations. First based in Cordova, she was assigned to the Tongass National Forest in 1953, and relocated to Petersburg. She is about 62 feet (19 m) long, 14.5 feet (4.4 m) wide, and is estimated to displace 40 tons.

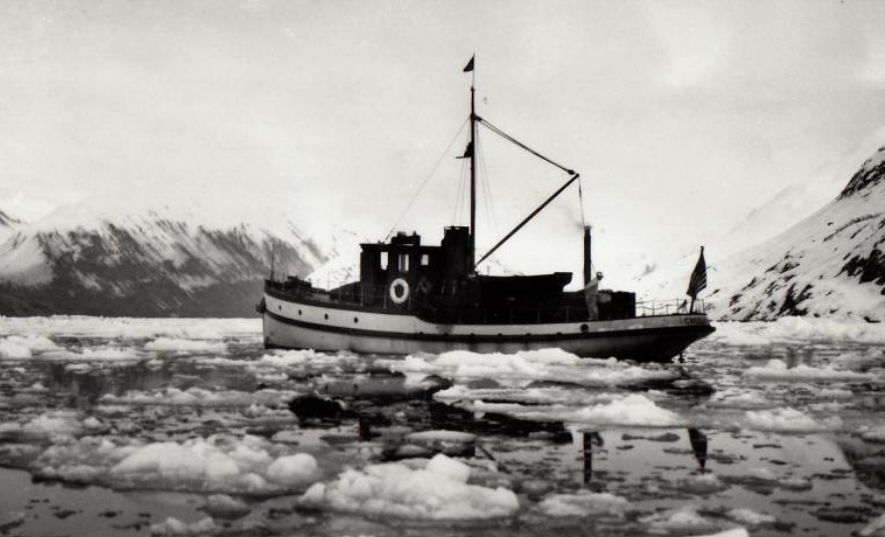
Chugach in 1928

The boat was listed on the National Register of Historic Places in 1992. In 2015 it was brought to Wrangell for restoration and in 2016 it was decided to take it out of service. It is on display at the Wrangell museum with plans to build a permanent display halted due to the COVID-19 pandemic.

== See also ==
- National Register of Historic Places listings in Petersburg Census Area, Alaska
