= Sons of Norway Hall =

- U.S. National Register of Historic Places
- Alaska Heritage Resources Survey
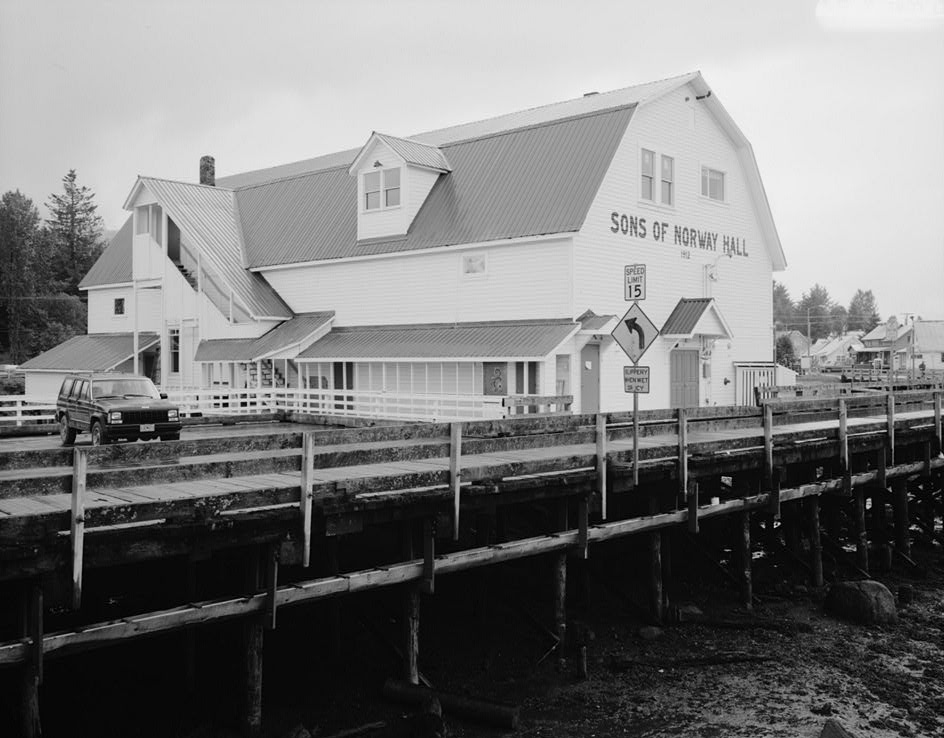
- Sons of Norway Hall in Petersburg, Alaska

- Location within Alaska
- Location: 10 Sing Lee Alley, Petersburg, Alaska
- Coordinates: 56°48′38″N 132°57′33″W
- Area: less than one acre
- Built: 1912
- Built by: Sons of Norway Lodge Members
- NRHP reference No.: 79003765
- AHRS No.: PET-119

Significant dates
- Added to NRHP: July 10, 1979
- Designated AHRS: December 21, 1977

The Sons of Norway Hall, also known as Fedrelandet Lodge #23, is a historic fraternal society building on Indian St. in Petersburg, Alaska. It is a large two-story wood-frame structure with a gambrel roof, measuring about 105 feet (32 m) in length and 55 feet (17 m) in width. Built in 1912 by volunteers, it was the first Sons of Norway lodge building built in Alaska. The hall was built large enough to stage events involving the entire community of Petersburg, and it was used for many years for all types of civic, social, public, and private events. During World War II it was used as an armory, and it served as a National Guard headquarters in the 1960s.

The building was listed on the National Register of Historic Places (NRHP) in 1979.

== See also ==
- National Register of Historic Places listings in Petersburg Census Area, Alaska
