= National Register of Historic Places listings in Skagway, Alaska =

Location of Skagway in Alaska

This is a list of the National Register of Historic Places listings in Skagway, Alaska.

This is intended to be a complete list of the districts on the National Register of Historic Places in Skagway, Alaska, United States. The locations of National Register districts for which the latitude and longitude coordinates are included below, may be seen in a Google map.

There are three districts listed on the National Register in the borough, including two National Historic Landmarks.

This National Park Service list is complete through NPS recent listings posted September 25, 2026.

== Current listings ==
	Name on the Register	Image	Date listed	Location	City or town	Description
1	Chilkoot Trail and Dyea Site	Chilkoot Trail and Dyea Site	April 14, 1975 (#75002120) (Note: Chilkoot Trail and the ghost town of Dyea were individually added to National Register of Historic Places as single properties in 1975. The NHLD designation of Chilkoot Trail and Dyea Site, in 1978, replaced NRHP reference 75002120 for Chilkoot Trail.)	Dyea to the Canada–US border 59°35′14″N 135°19′56″W	Skagway	Also a contributing property to Klondike Gold Rush National Historical Park.
2	Klondike Goldrush National Historical Park	Klondike Goldrush National Historical Park	June 30, 1976 (#76002189)	Union of Chilkoot Trail and Dyea Site and Skagway Historic District and White Pass; 59°34′31″N 135°15′49″W	Skagway	
3	Skagway Historic District and White Pass	Skagway Historic District and White Pass	October 15, 1966 (#66000943)	Skagway historic downtown and White Pass up to the Canada–US border 59°32′41″N 135°12′29″W	Skagway	Also a contributing property to Klondike Gold Rush National Historical Park.

== See also ==
- List of National Historic Landmarks in Alaska
- National Register of Historic Places listings in Alaska
