= National Register of Historic Places listings in Alaska =

This is a list of properties and districts listed on the National Register of Historic Places in Alaska. There are approximately 400 listed sites in Alaska. Each of the state's 30 boroughs and census areas has at least two listings on the National Register, except for the Kusilvak Census Area, which has none.

Contents: Boroughs and census areas in Alaska Borough names are highlighted in bold
**Aleutians East** • Aleutians West • **Anchorage** • Bethel • **Bristol Bay** • Chugach • Copper River • **Denali** • Dillingham • **Fairbanks North Star** • **Haines** • Hoonah–Angoon • **Juneau** • **Kenai Peninsula** • **Ketchikan Gateway** • **Kodiak Island** • Kusilvak • **Lake and Peninsula** • **Matanuska-Susitna** • Nome • **North Slope** • **Northwest Arctic** • Petersburg • Prince of Wales–Hyder • **Sitka** • **Skagway** • Southeast Fairbanks • **Wrangell** • **Yakutat** • Yukon–Koyukuk

This National Park Service list is complete through NPS recent listings posted October 2, 2026.

== Numbers of listings by borough or census area ==
The following are approximate tallies of current listings in Alaska on the National Register of Historic Places. These counts are based on entries in the National Register Information Database as of April 24, 2008 and new weekly listings posted since then on the National Register of Historic Places web site. There are frequent additions to the listings and occasional delistings, and the counts here are not official. Also, the counts in this table exclude boundary increase and decrease listings which modify the area covered by an existing property or district and which carry a separate National Register reference number.

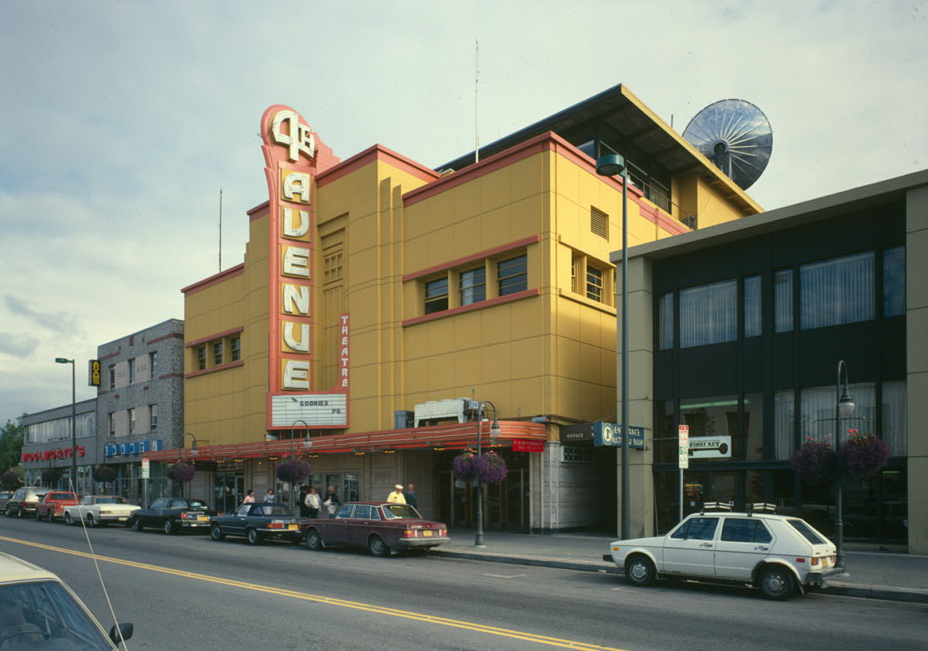
Fourth Avenue Theatre, in Anchorage

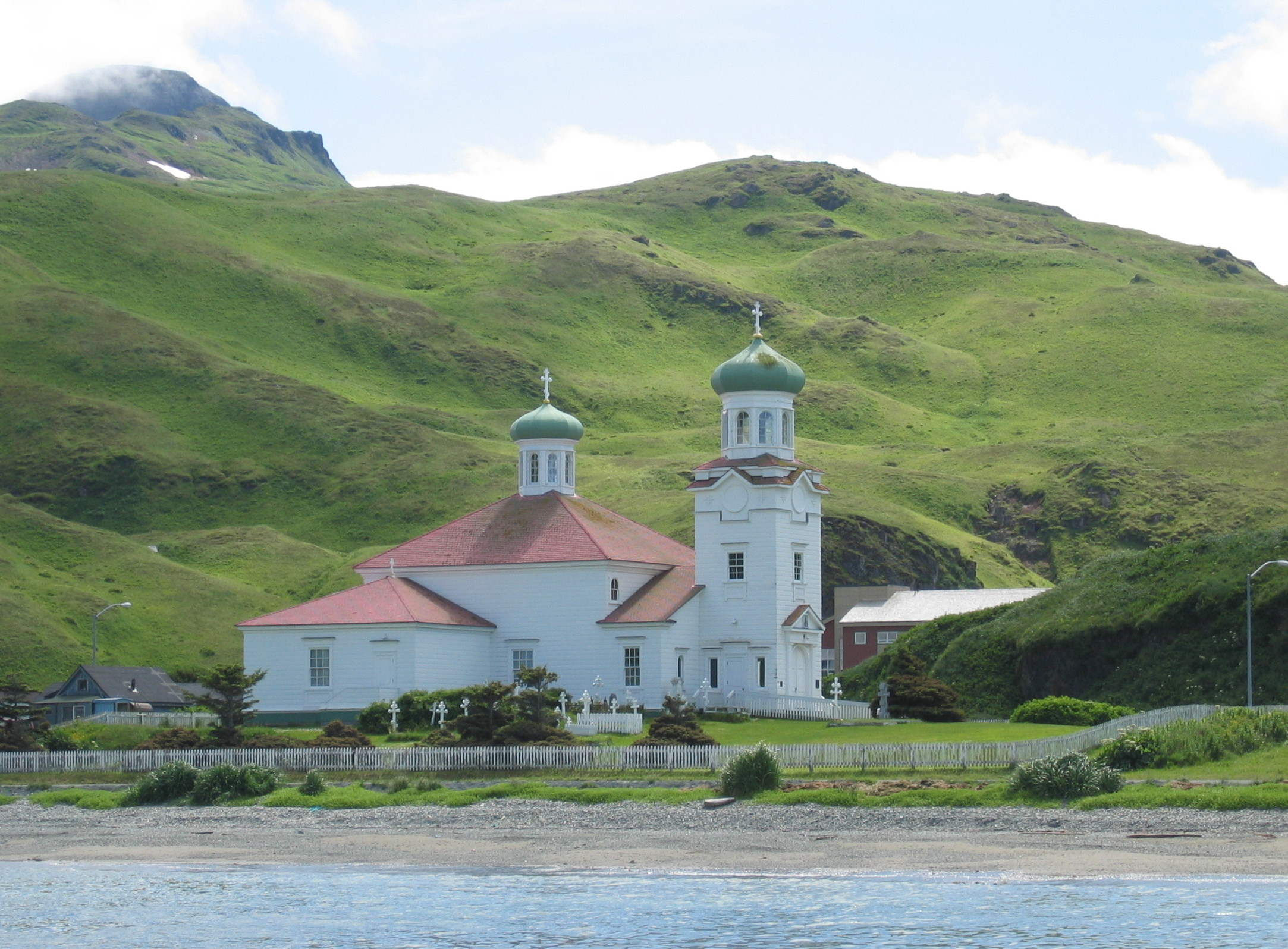
Church of the Holy Ascension, in Unalaska

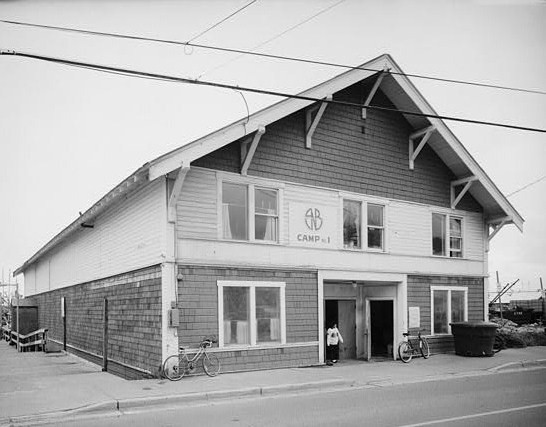
Alaska Native Brotherhood Hall

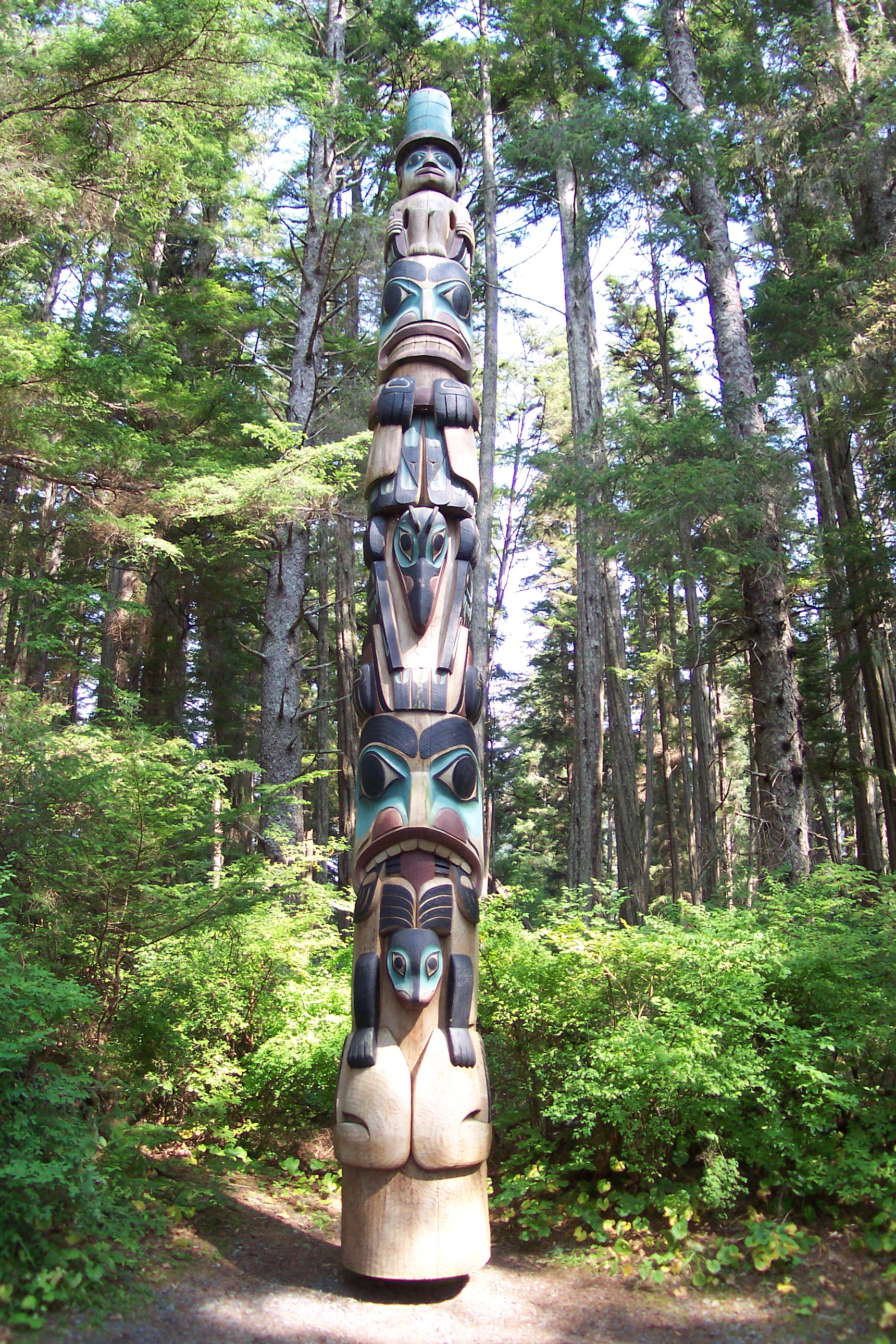
Sitka National Historical Park

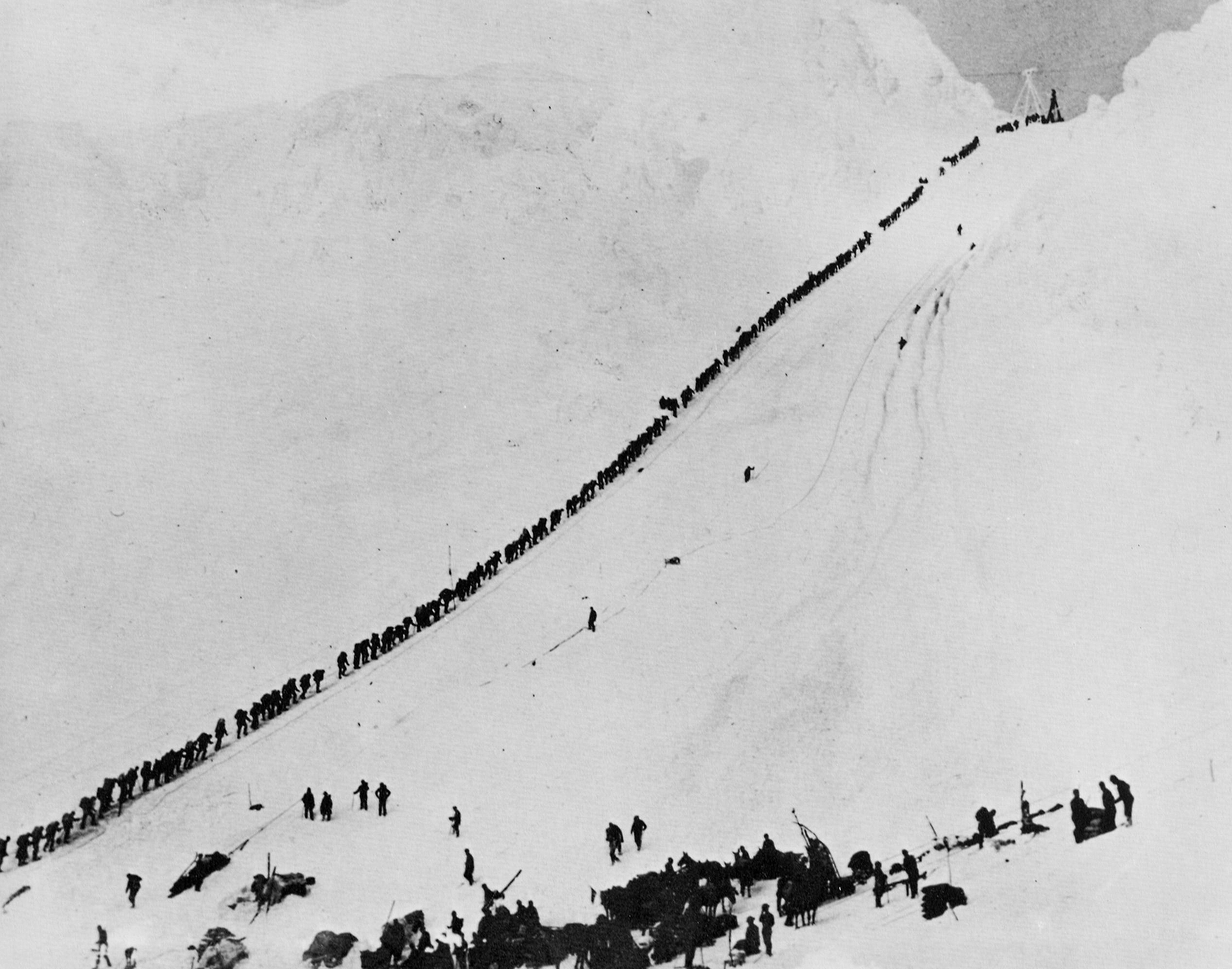
Chilkoot Trail and Dyea Site

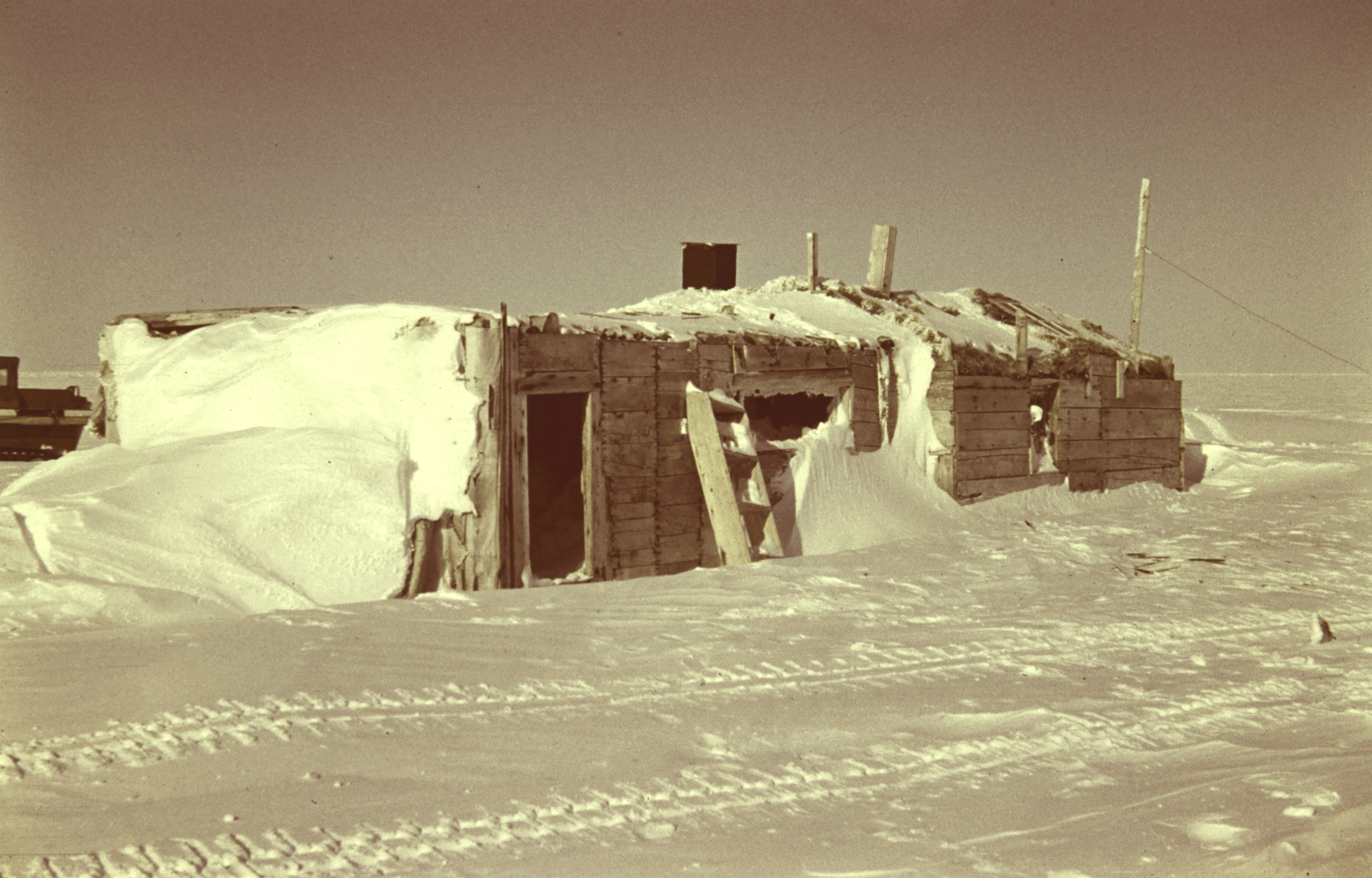
Leffingwell Camp Site

	Borough or Census Area	# of Sites
1	Aleutians East	4
2	Aleutians West	15
3	Anchorage	37
4	Bethel	7
5	Bristol Bay	3
6	Chugach	10
7	Copper River	18
8	Denali	22
9	Dillingham	3
10	Fairbanks North Star	35
11	Haines	6
12	Hoonah–Angoon	21
13	Juneau	23
14	Kenai Peninsula	38
15	Ketchikan Gateway	20
16	Kodiak Island	27
17	Kusilvak	0
18	Lake and Peninsula	25
19	Matanuska-Susitna	30
20	Nome	20
21	North Slope	18
22	Northwest Arctic	3
23	Petersburg	4
24	Prince of Wales–Hyder	8
25	Sitka	22
26	Skagway	3
27	Southeast Fairbanks	12
28	Wrangell	4
29	Yakutat	1
30	Yukon–Koyukuk	18
(duplicates)		(2)
TOTAL		455

== See also ==
- List of National Historic Landmarks in Alaska
- List of historical societies in Alaska
