= Skagway Historic District and White Pass =

Historic district in Alaska, United States

- U.S. National Register of Historic Places
- U.S. National Historic Landmark District
- U.S. Historic district – Contributing property
- Alaska Heritage Resources Survey
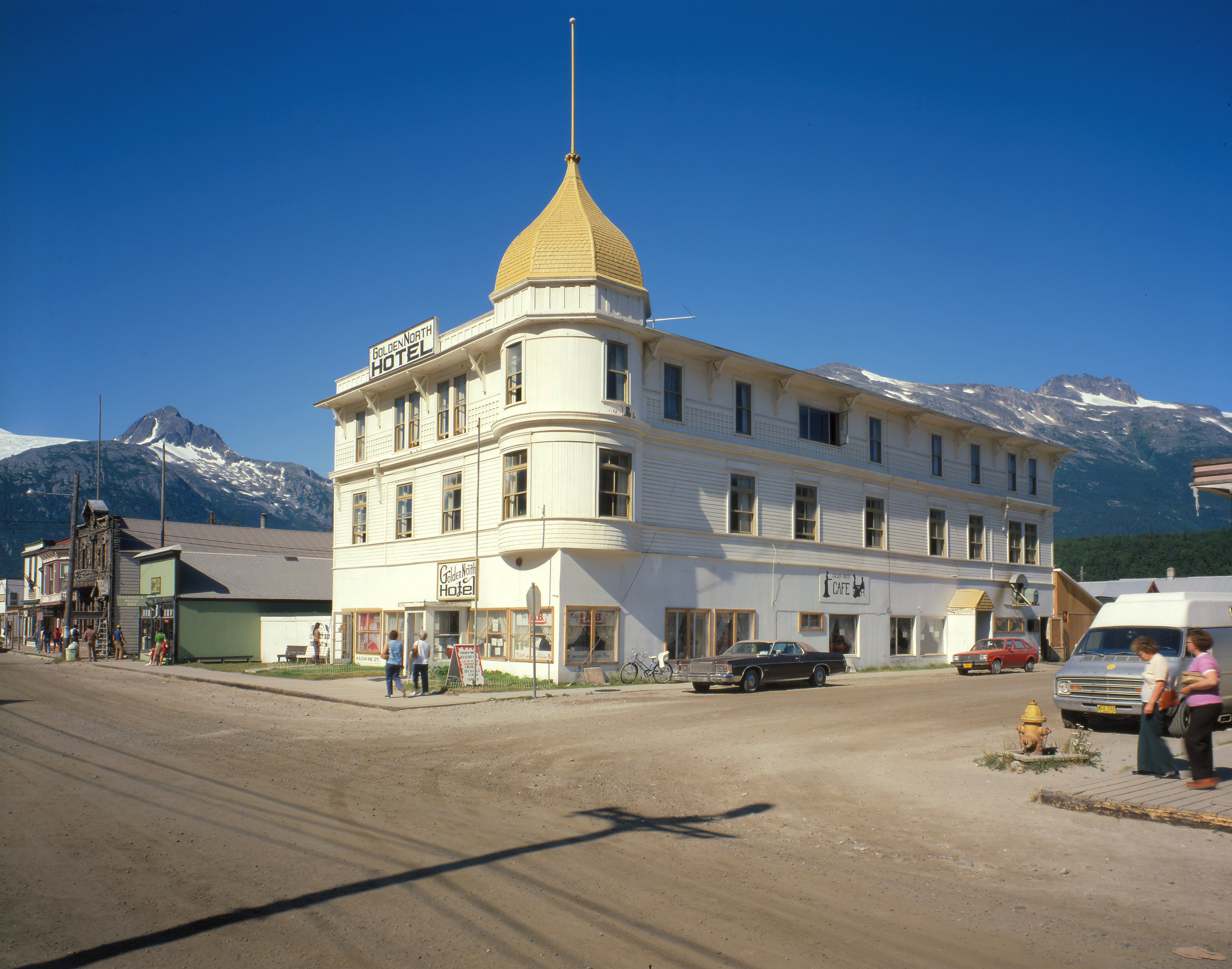

- Location within Alaska
- Interactive map showing the location of Skagway Historic District and White Pass
- Nearest city: Skagway, Alaska
- Coordinates: 59°32′41″N 135°12′29″W
- Area: 3,140 acres (1,270 ha)
- Built: 1897
- Part of: Klondike Gold Rush National Historical Park (ID76002189)
- NRHP reference No.: 66000943
- AHRS No.: SKG-013

Significant dates
- Added to NRHP: October 15, 1966
- Designated NHLD: June 13, 1962
- Designated CP: June 30, 1976

The Skagway Historic District and White Pass is a National Historic Landmark District encompassing a significant portion of the area within the United States associated with the Klondike Gold Rush. It includes the historic portion of Skagway, Alaska, including the entire road grid of the 1897 town, as well as the entire valley on the United States side of White Pass all the way to the Canada–US border. This area includes surviving fragments of three historic routes used during the Gold Rush, as well as the route of the White Pass and Yukon Railroad. Almost 100 buildings remain from the Gold Rush period. Portions of the district are preserved as part of Klondike Gold Rush National Historical Park.

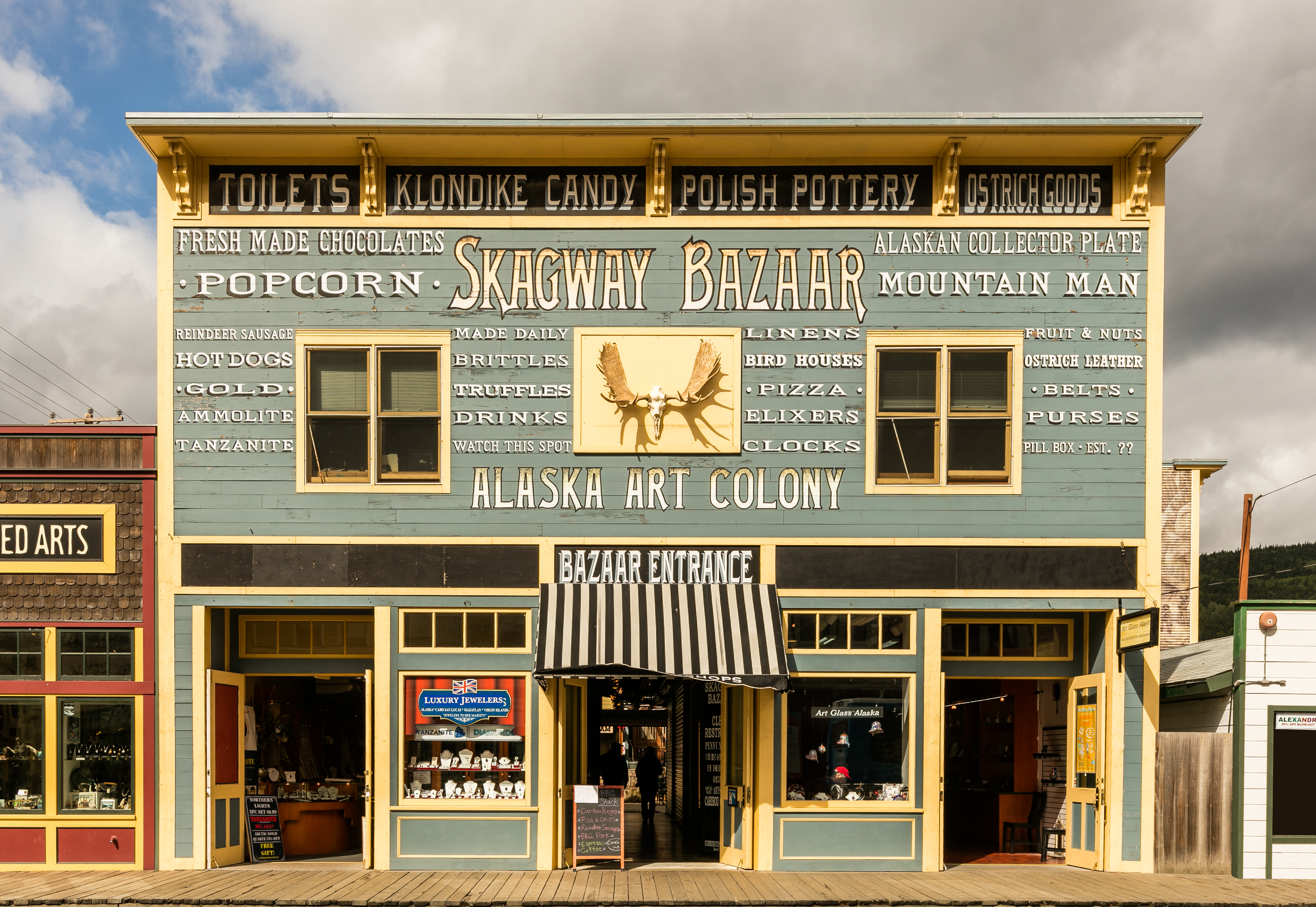
Skagway Bazaar shop in 2017

The Skagway portion of the district includes the historic heart of the town, a region 23 block long and varying in width from three to five blocks. Fourteen of these blocks were under National Park Service protection in 1999. Buildings in the district are generally wood-frame structures with one or two stories, which have been brightly painted. Commercial buildings often have false fronts, commercial window displays, and recessed entries, and are sited directly against the sidewalk, while residences are set back. The district includes more than 350 buildings in Skagway, and only eight structures outside the city.

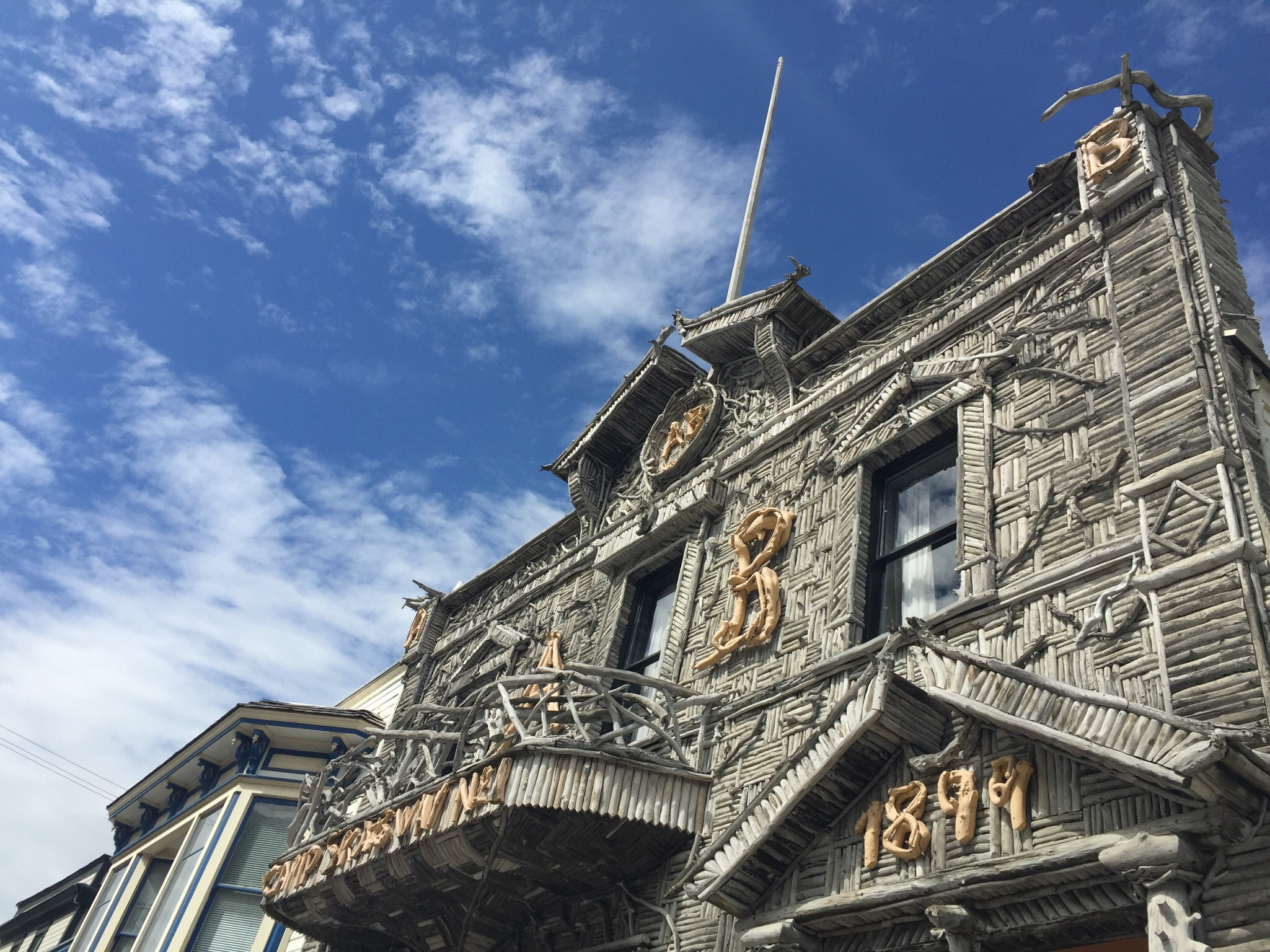
Arctic Brotherhood Hall

The Arctic Brotherhood Hall (1899), its front covered with driftwood, is one of the contributing buildings.

The valley that rises steeply above Skagway was one of the main routes to the gold fields of the Yukon River. (The other, the Chilkoot Trail, is located west of Skagway, and is part of the National Historic Landmark Chilkoot Trail and Dyea Site historic district.) Two overland routes, the 1897 trail and the Brackett Wagon Road, worked their way up White Pass, as did a water-based route along the Skagway River, and the White Pass and Yukon Railroad, completed in 1900. Part of the valley now also carries the Klondike Highway. There are numerous areas along these historic routes (some of which have not been identified with precision, and may have followed variable routes during the rush) where camp sites and other remnants of the rush are to be found.

== See also ==
- List of National Historic Landmarks in Alaska
- National Register of Historic Places listings in Skagway, Alaska
