= Strandhögg =

Viking's raiding technique

Strandhogg in old Norse was a Viking tactic consisting of a coastal raid with the intention of capturing livestock and indigenous peoples for the slave trade. This tactic was enhanced by Viking longships' shallow draft.

The Vikings had already developed spy networks from their many commercial encounters with vicus. These spies informed them of the local customs, the dates of religious feasts, helped with translation and indicated places to plunder and personalities to be removed and held for ransom. It happened that Vikings made these raids against their own countrymen as well. Harald I, known as Harald Fairhair, prohibited strandhogg on the Norwegian territory.

== Later uses ==
The term remains in use in Iceland. With the rise of neoliberal, free-market ideology in the country in the 1990s, it came to be used of hostile takeovers and other aggressive business practices by Icelandic businessmen.

This term now also refers to two specific Android exploits.
