= Sons of Norway =

Norwegian-American fraternal order

Coordinates: 44°56′53″N 93°18′00″W

- Sønner av Norge
- Established: January 16, 1895; 131 years ago
- Founded at: Minneapolis, Minnesota, United States
- Type: Mutual aid society
- Region served: United States
- Website: www.sofn.com daughtersofnorway.org
- Formerly called: Independent Order of the Sons of Norway

Sons of Norway (Norwegian: Sønner av Norge), founded in 1895 as the Independent Order of the Sons of Norway, is a fraternal organization principally representing people of Norwegian heritage in the United States and Canada. The organization includes in its mission the promotion and preservation of the heritage and culture of Norway and other Nordic countries. It also sells life insurance and other financial products to its members. The organization is classified as a non-profit 501(c)(8) fraternal beneficiary society.

In the early 21st century, the Sons of Norway has nearly 400 lodges in the United States, Canada, and Norway. With more than 57,000 members, the Sons of Norway is the largest Norwegian organization outside of Norway.

== History ==
=== Establishment ===
Vintage Sons of Norway lapel pins worn by members.

The Sons of Norway was founded as the Independent Order of the Sons of Norway. The organization was founded by 18 members on January 16, 1895, in Minneapolis, Minnesota, to insure each other when they were unable to secure life insurance on their own. Norwegian immigrants were still getting established in the United States, and were numerous in this city. Membership was originally open to males of Norwegian descent between the ages of 20 and 50 who were capable of giving proof of being morally upright, in good health, and capable of supporting a family.

A second lodge was established in South Minneapolis in 1899 and a third was founded in the northeastern section of the city in 1900. The Minneapolis model quickly spread and by the end of 1900, some 12 lodges of the organization had been established in cities and towns with substantial Norwegian-American populations across the American Upper Midwest.

From its origins in Minnesota, the organization spread to both coasts. A lodge of the order was established as far away as what was then the American territory of Alaska. Numerous Norwegian immigrants and their descendants worked on fishing boats based in such cities as Petersburg.

In 1903 a group in Seattle asked the Midwestern group for a charter; however, they did not wish to have compulsory insurance for the members, which the parent order had made mandatory as part of membership. The Seattle group organized as Leif Erikson Lodge No. 1 in spite of the Midwest lodges. With other West Coast lodges, it set up the Grand Lodge of the Sons of Norway of the Pacific Coast. The two orders quarreled until they held a convention in Superior, Wisconsin in June 1909, and bridged their differences to merge the next year.

By the time of the outbreak of World War I in 1914, the Sons of Norway claimed a membership of about 12,000.

=== Development ===
Originally established as a secret order, most of the ritualistic aspects of the order were removed in the early part of the twentieth century at the request of the Reverend Hans Gerhard Stub, president of the Norwegian Lutheran Synod.

The organization published an official monthly magazine, Sønner av Norge (Sons of Norway), which kept members abreast of activities of the group. Other activities included regular lectures on historical, cultural, and literary topics; essay and speech contests for students; and organized festivities for various national Norwegian holidays. The Sons of Norway also worked to expand the instruction of the Norwegian language in public schools. As of the 2000s, the magazine is named "Viking".

=== 1938 merger ===
In December 1938, the Sons of Norway absorbed the American auxiliary of The Knights of the White Cross Order (Riddere av Det Hvite Kors), which had been founded in Chicago in 1863.

=== Daughters of Norway ===
Women were admitted to local groups as early as 1916, in areas where the female auxiliary was unorganized. Daughters of Norway lodges in the Midwest were merged with the Sons of Norway in 1950, and a system of junior lodges was created in 1956. The Grand Lodge of the Daughters of Norway, which dates to 1908, continues as a separate association.

== Organization today ==
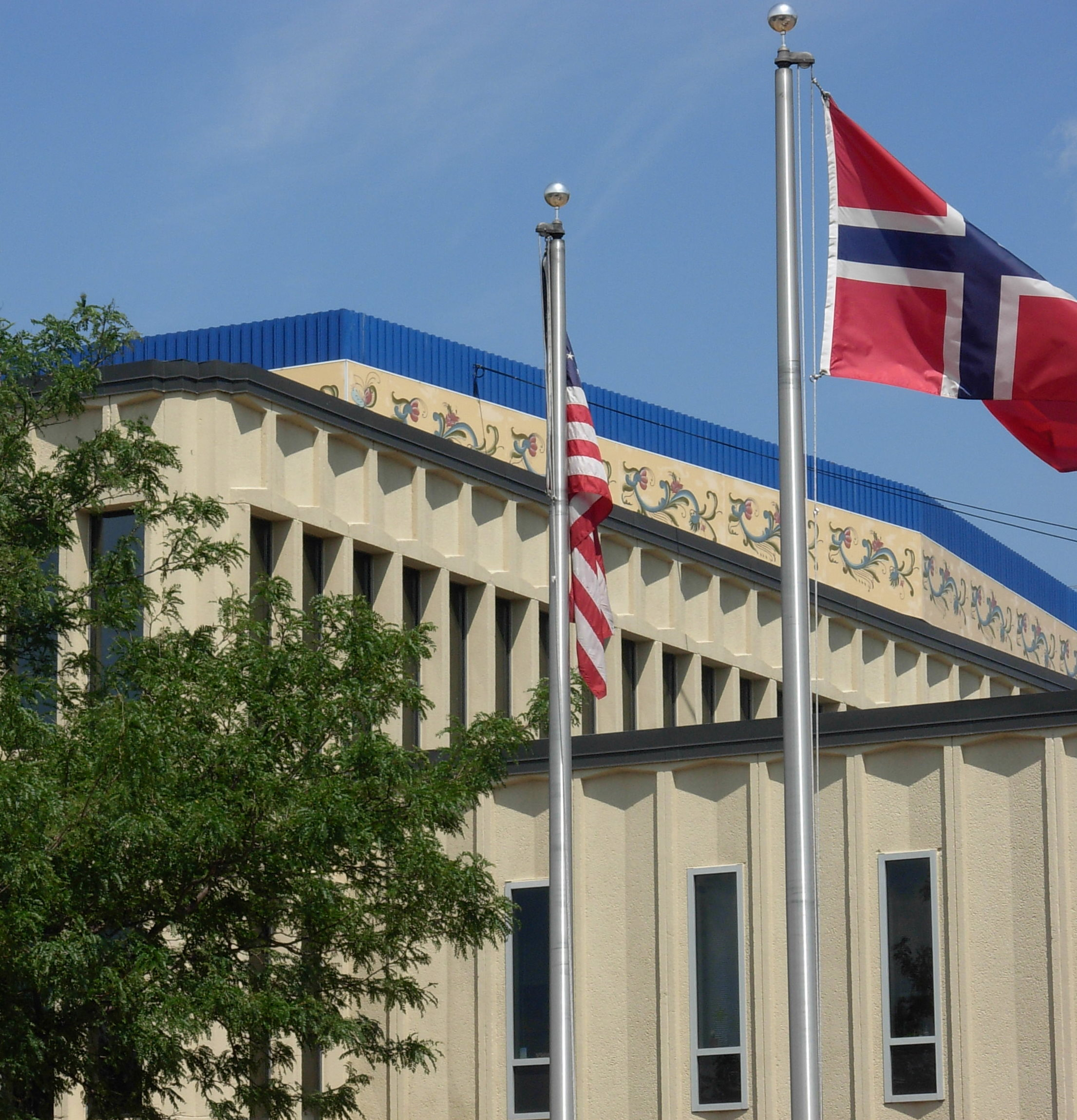
Sons of Norway Building in Minneapolis, Minnesota

The organization slowly expanded across the United States and includes lodges in Canada and Norway. In the 2000s, Sons of Norway continued to make an effort to build on the traditions of the past while at the same time focusing on modern Norwegian–American lives.

=== Membership ===
Membership is open to everyone with an interest in Norwegian or Norwegian–American culture. Currently, the Sons of Norway has nearly 400 lodges in the United States, Canada and Norway. There were 90,000 members in 1995, and 64,186 members in 2010.

=== Insurance benefits ===
The benefits offered by the Sons of Norway have fluctuated over the years. They originally offered life, sickness, and accident insurance but in 1934, during the Great Depression, restricted coverage to life insurance only. Gradually, other benefits were restored.

== Statistics ==
As of December 31, 2013:

- Total Members: 58,178
- Members in the United States: 54,435
- Members in Canada: 2,499
- Members in Norway: 1,244
- Lodges: 380
- Life Insurance In Force: $675,520,000
- Number Insurance Certificates in Force: 16,913

In 2013, Sons of Norway lodges and members gave more than 500,000 hours of volunteerism and $1 million to their communities. The Sons of Norway also maintains a large library of Nordic works. It operates a retirement home called Norse Home, located in Seattle.

== International conventions ==
The International Lodge Convention is held every two years, usually in August. Each District holds a convention every two years as well.

Here are the locations of recent international conventions:

- 2022 – 66th Sons of Norway International Convention, Eagan, Minnesota
- 2020 – 66th Sons of Norway International Convention, Ringsaker, Norway - postponed due to the COVID-19 pandemic
- 2018 – 65th Sons of Norway International Convention, Minneapolis, Minnesota
- 2016 – 64th Sons of Norway International Convention, Tacoma, Washington
- 2014 – 63rd Sons of Norway International Convention, Jacksonville, Florida
- 2012 – 62nd Sons of Norway International Convention, Fargo, North Dakota
- 2010 – 61st Sons of Norway International Convention, Coeur d'Alene, Idaho
- 2008 – 60th Sons of Norway International Convention, San Diego, California
- 2006 – 59th Sons of Norway International Convention. Vancouver, British Columbia, Canada
- 2004 – 58th Sons of Norway International Convention, Washington D.C.
- 2002 – 57th Sons of Norway International Convention, Madison, Wisconsin
- 2000 – 56th Sons of Norway International Convention, Stavanger, Norway
- 1998 – 55th Sons of Norway International Convention, Anaheim, California
- 1996 – 54th Sons of Norway International Convention, unknown
- 1994 – 53rd Sons of Norway International Convention, Saint Paul, Minnesota
- 1992 – 52nd Sons of Norway International Convention, Lillehammer, Norway

== Notable buildings ==
Some of the Sons of Norway's buildings are historic and/or are otherwise notable, including:

- Sons of Norway Building, 1455 W Lake St, Minneapolis, Minnesota The building was opened in 1962. In 2017, the building and surrounding two-acre land was sold to developers, who will demolish it in order to develop the city block for a multi-use project. The organization will move back in as an anchor tenant once the new project is complete.
- Sons of Norway Hall, Petersburg, Alaska, built 1912, listed on the National Register of Historic Places (NRHP)
- Sons of Norway building of Minot, North Dakota, built 1915, a contributing building in the NRHP-listed Minot Commercial Historic District
