= Mount Harding (Alaska) =

Mountain in Alaska, United States

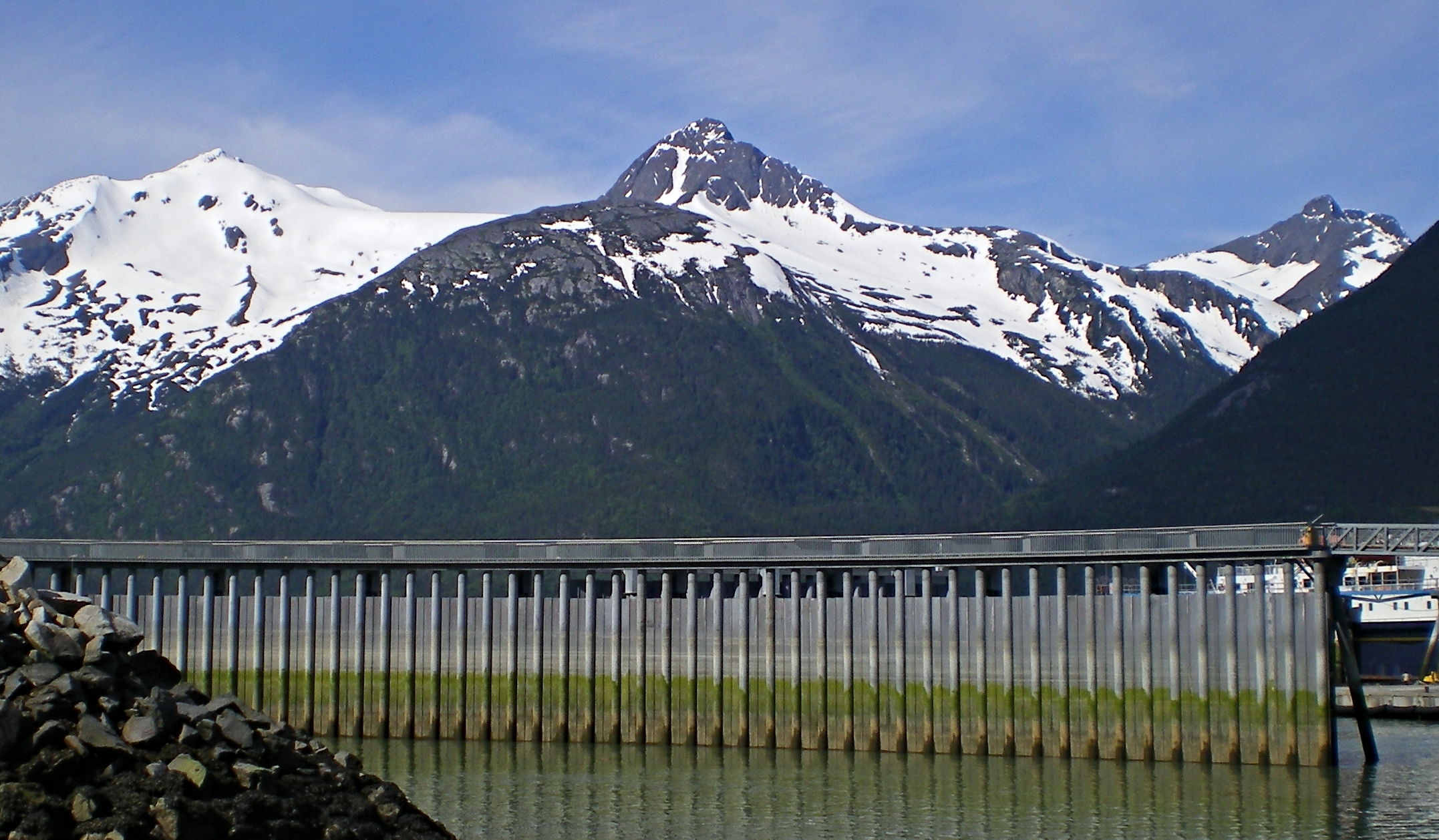
- Northeast aspect, from Skagway (Witch Mountain, peak to left)

Highest point
- Elevation: 5,321 ft (1,622 m)
- Prominence: 821 ft (250 m)
- Parent peak: Witch Mountain (5,380 ft)
- Isolation: 1.07 mi (1.72 km)
- Coordinates: 59°25′06″N 135°26′01″W

Geography
- Location within Alaska
- Interactive map of Mount Harding
- Location: Tongass National Forest; Skagway Borough; Alaska, United States
- Parent range: Coast Mountains; Boundary Ranges
- Topo map: USGS Skagway B-2

Mount Harding is a prominent 5,321 ft (1,620 m) mountain summit located in the Boundary Ranges of the Coast Mountains, in the U.S. state of Alaska. The peak is situated 4.5 mi (7 km) southwest of Skagway, and 3 mi (5 km) south of Face Mountain. Although modest in elevation, relief is significant since Mount Harding rises 5,300 feet above Taiya Inlet in less than 2 mi (3 km). The peak was named in 1924 by the Skagway Alpine Club to honor President Warren G. Harding (1865–1923), 29th president of the United States who visited Skagway on July 11, 1923. He was the first and only president to visit Skagway. Harding died three weeks later in San Francisco. The mountain's name was officially adopted in 1986 by the U.S. Board on Geographic Names. Precipitation runoff from the mountain drains east into Taiya Inlet, and west into Ferebee River.

== Climate ==
Based on the Köppen climate classification, Mount Harding has a subarctic climate with cold, snowy winters, and cool summers. Weather systems coming off the Gulf of Alaska are forced upwards by the Coast Mountains (orographic lift), causing heavy precipitation in the form of rainfall and snowfall. Temperatures can drop below −20 °C with wind chill factors below −30 °C. This climate supports a glacier south of the summit, and a smaller one on the northwest slope. The months May through July offer the most favorable weather for viewing or climbing Mount Harding.

== Gallery ==
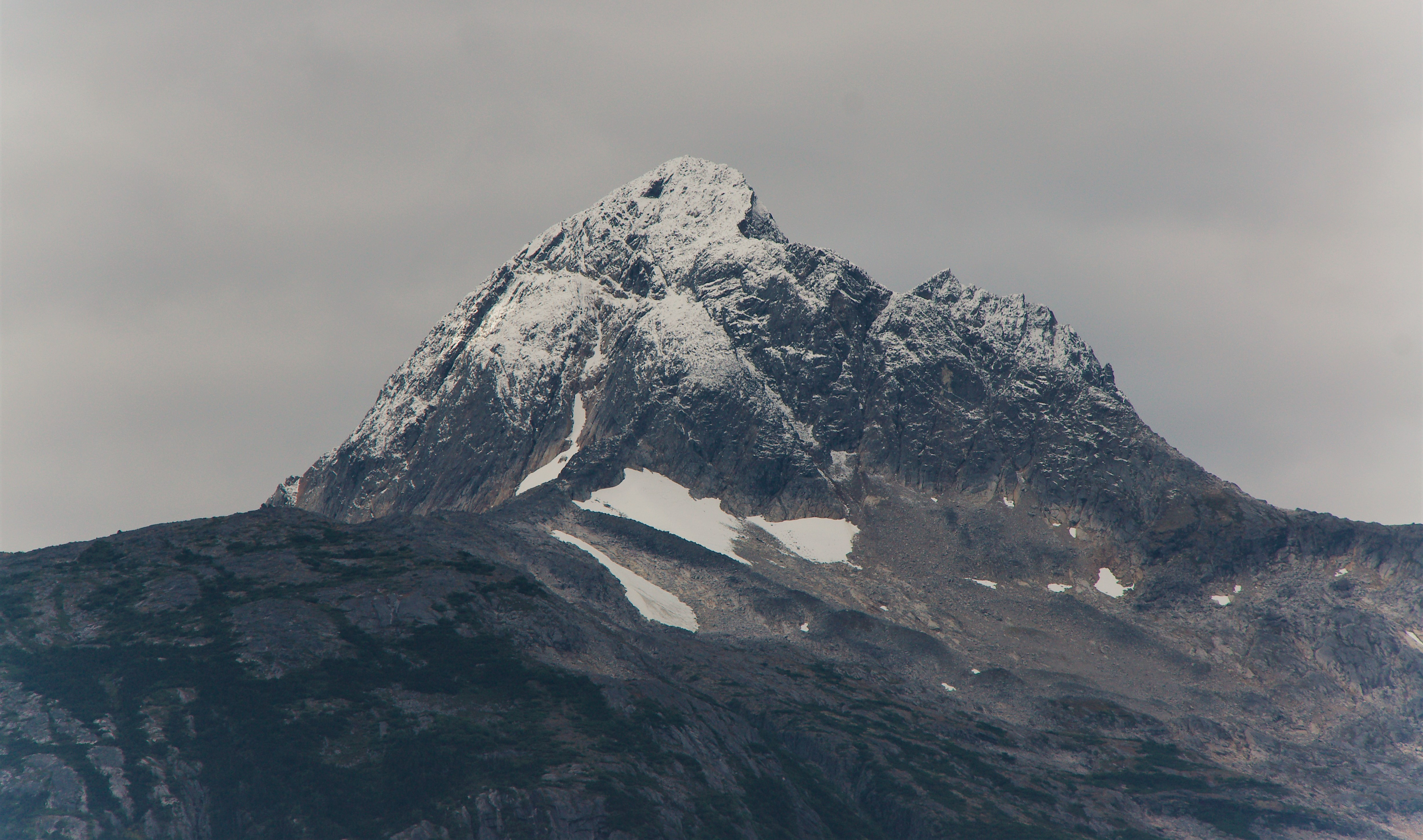
Mount Harding summit

== See also ==
- List of mountain peaks of Alaska
- Geography of Alaska
