= Skagway, Alaska =

Consolidated city-borough in Alaska, US

Municipality of Skagway Shg̱agwei
- Borough
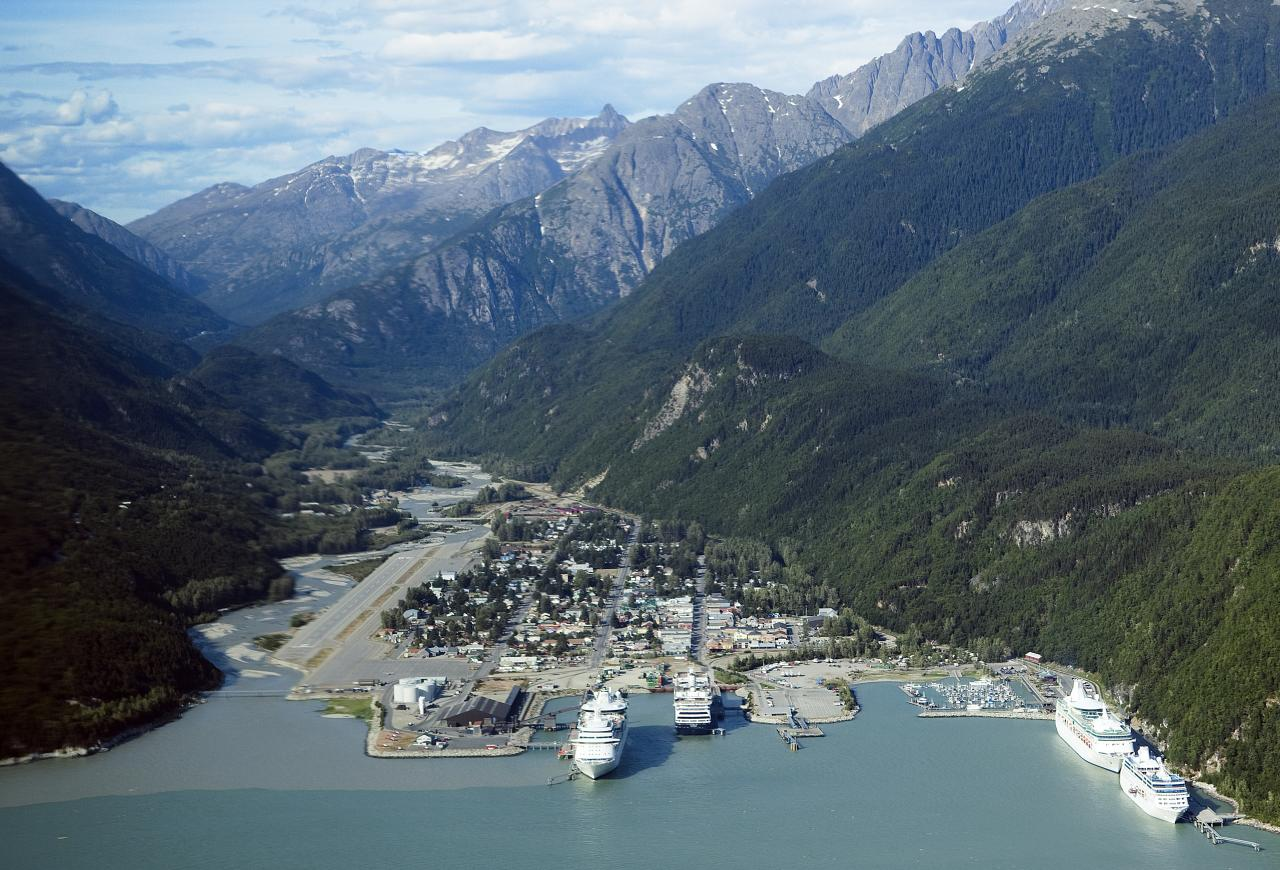
- Aerial view of Skagway in 2009

- Seal
- Nickname: "Gateway to the Klondike"
- Location of Skagway in Alaska
- Coordinates: 59°27′30″N 135°18′50″W
- Country: United States
- State: Alaska
- Founded: 1897
- Incorporated (city): June 28, 1900
- Incorporated (borough): June 5, 2007

Government
  - Mayor: Sam Bass
  - State senator: Jesse Kiehl (D)
  - State rep.: Sara Hannan (D)

Area
  - Borough: 9.49 sq mi (24.59 km^{2})
  - Land: 9.44 sq mi (24.46 km^{2})
  - Water: 0.046 sq mi (0.12 km^{2})
- Elevation: 33 ft (10 m)

Population (2020)
  - Borough: 1,240
  - Estimate (2025): 1,104 ▼
  - Density: 131/sq mi (50.7/km^{2})
  - Urban (CDP): 1,164
- Time zone: UTC−9 (AKST)
  - Summer (DST): UTC−8 (AKDT)
- Zip Code: 99840
- Area code: 907
- FIPS code: 02-70760
- GNIS feature ID: 1414754; 2339479
- Website: skagway.org

The Municipality and Borough of Skagway (Tlingit: Shg̱agwei) is a borough and city in the U.S. state of Alaska, on the Alaska Panhandle. As of the 2020 census, the population was 1,240, up from 968 in 2010. The population doubles in the summer tourist season in order to deal with the large number of summer tourists each year. Incorporated as a borough on June 25, 2007, it was previously a city (urban Skagway located at 59°27′30″N 135°18′50″W) in the Skagway-Yakutat-Angoon Census Area (now the Hoonah–Angoon Census Area, Alaska). The most populated community is the census-designated place of Skagway.

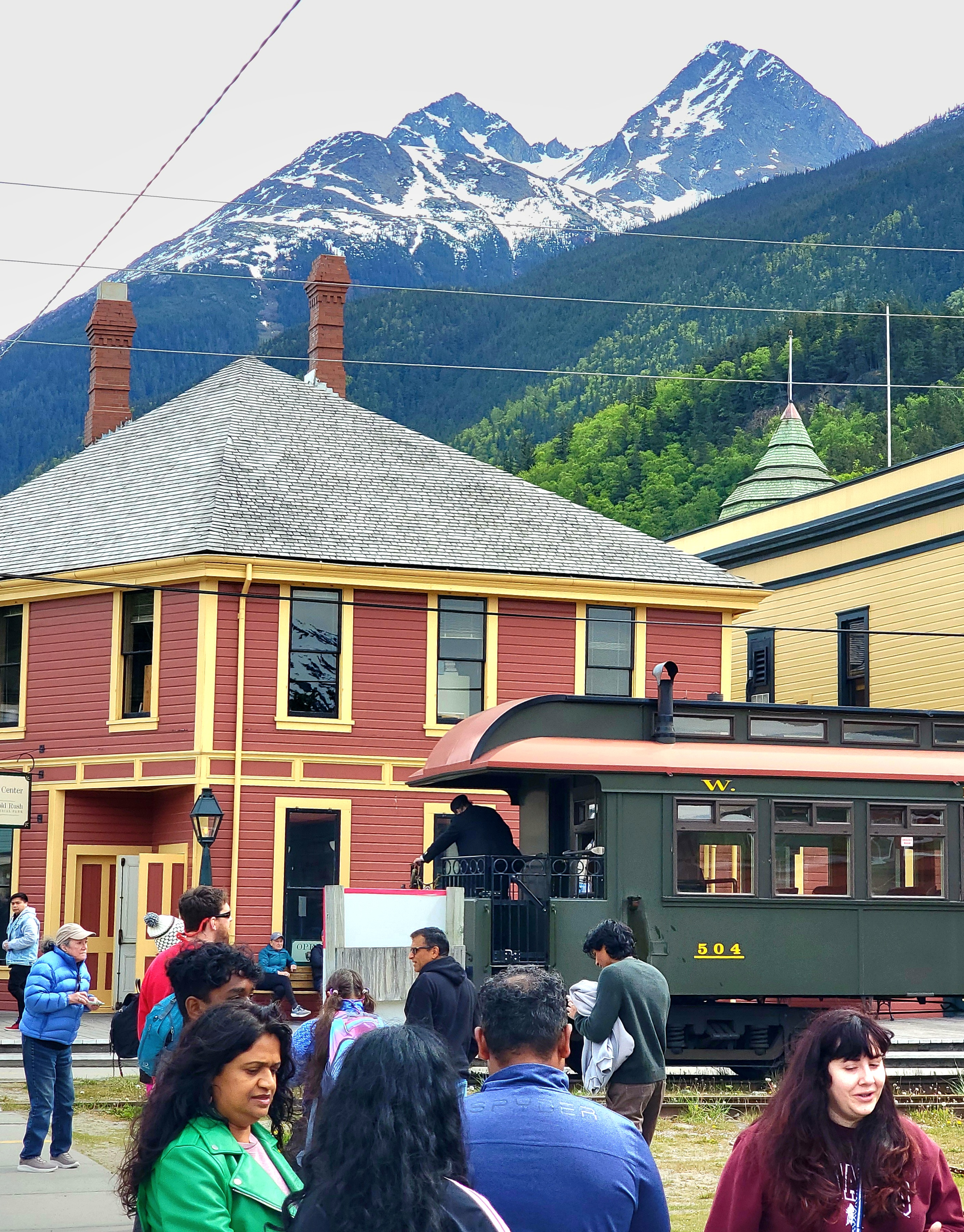
Rail car of the White Pass and Yukon Route in Skagway, Alaska

Skagway, on the Taiya Inlet, was an important saltwater port during the Klondike Gold Rush. The White Pass and Yukon Route narrow gauge railroad, part of the area's mining past, now in operation purely for the tourist trade and running throughout the summer months, has its starting point at the port of Skagway. Skagway is a popular stop for cruise ships, and the tourist trade is a big part of the business of Skagway.

Skagway is also the setting for part of Jack London's book The Call of the Wild, Will Hobbs's book Jason's Gold, and Joe Haldeman's novel, Guardian. The John Wayne film North to Alaska (1960) was filmed nearby.

The name Skagway (historically also spelled Skaguay) is the English divergent of sha-ka-ԍéi, a Tlingit idiom which figuratively refers to rough seas in the Taiya Inlet, which are caused by strong north winds.

Skagway is the headquarters of Skagway Village, a federally recognized Alaska Native tribe.

== History ==
=== Etymology and the Mythical Stone Woman ===
Skagway is the English adaptation of sha-ka-ԍéi, a Tlingit idiom which figuratively refers to rough seas in the Taiya Inlet, that are caused by strong north winds. Literally, sha-ka-ԍéi is a verbal noun which means pretty woman. The verbal noun was derived from the Tlingit finite verb theme -sha-ka-li-ԍéi, which means, in the case of a woman, to be pretty.

The story behind the name is that Sha-ka-ԍéi or Skagway ["Pretty Woman"] was the nickname of Kanagoo, a mythical woman who transformed herself into stone at Skagway Bay and who (according to the story) now causes the strong, channeled winds which blow toward Haines, Alaska. The rough seas caused by these winds have therefore been referred to figuratively by using Kanagoo's nickname, Sha-ka-ԍéi or Skagway.

The Kanagoo stone formation is now known as Face Mountain, which is seen from Skagway Bay. The Tlingit name for Face Mountain is Kanagoo Yahaayí [Kanagoo's Image/Soul].

=== Early Skagway ===
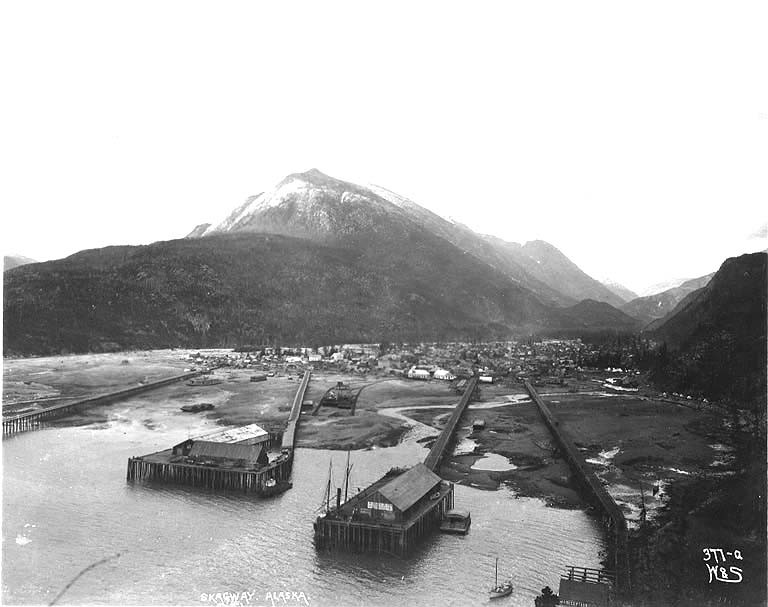
Skagway wharves and harbor c. 1898 photo by Eric A. Hegg

One prominent resident of early Skagway was William "Billy" Moore, a steamboat captain and veteran of the Stikine and Cassiar gold rushes. As part of an 1887 Canadian boundary survey expedition, he investigated the Coast Mountains pass—later known as White Pass—and identified the route for the future White Pass & Yukon Route railroad. In 1887, Moore and his son claimed a 160-acre homestead at the Skagway River mouth, and his vessel, the Gertrude, faced delays during U.S. customs blockades.

Vaguely defined boundaries along the Alaska Panhandle created overlapping territorial claims. While Canada proposed a joint survey in 1871, the U.S. rejected it as "too costly" given the region's remoteness and limited perceived value. This rejection was disingenuous, as politicians and southern newspapers simultaneously touted the area's strategic timber, fisheries, and mineral potential, framing the purchase as a step toward annexing British Columbia. Because the head of the inlet remained unsurveyed in 1887, Captain William Moore and his son considered the Skagway River mouth British territory, formally registering a 160-acre pre-emption claim in Victoria through the British Columbia Lands Office and registry under the Land Act. Frustrated by American delay, Canada dispatched surveyor Joseph Hunter in 1877 to establish a provisional boundary on the Stikine River, compelling the U.S. to recognize the territorial limits.

This lack of diplomatic consensus had already caused localized friction. In 1874, during the nearby Cassiar Gold Rush, despite treaty guarantees of free navigation by British vessels to access the transmontane interior via the Taku and Stikine rivers, the U.S. Army reinforced and reoccupied Fort Wrangell and began to impose restrictive customs blockades on the Stikine River where it transitioned out of American-claimed coastal waters, a campaign that heavily targeted and disrupted Moore's riverboat operations, the first vessel to be seized being his Gertrude. This blockade resulted in a flurry of cables between Whitehall, Ottawa, and Washington, which ultimately ordered the commander at Fort Wrangell to stand down and allow British vessels access to the river, although exorbitant duties and fees witnessed a continued imposition. Sir Matthew Baillie Begbie, Chief Justice of the British Columbia Supreme Court, defied the attempts by the Fort Wrangell commander to subject him to this jurisdictional squeeze; he famously voyaged to the Cassiar goldfields by canoe and held court and assizes to decisively underscore British tenure and judicial sovereignty in the region.

Among these cases was that of an Irish-American criminal named Martin who escaped custody and fled downriver and was re-arrested near the Great Glacier; Lord Carnarvon, British Colonial Secretary, alongside Canadian officials then in BC dealing with controversies due to the lack of even a start on the transcontinental railway, sought to intervene. However, Canadian authorities were ultimately convinced by American diplomatic pressure that Martin's physical re-arrest had technically occurred on U.S. territorial soil, leading to his release and handover to U.S. custody. As a direct result of this infamous case, a pro tem "working boundary" or modus vivendi was agreed upon many miles upstream from the sea; while never intended to be permanent, this compromise line effectively became formalized via the 1903 boundary tribunal's final verdict.

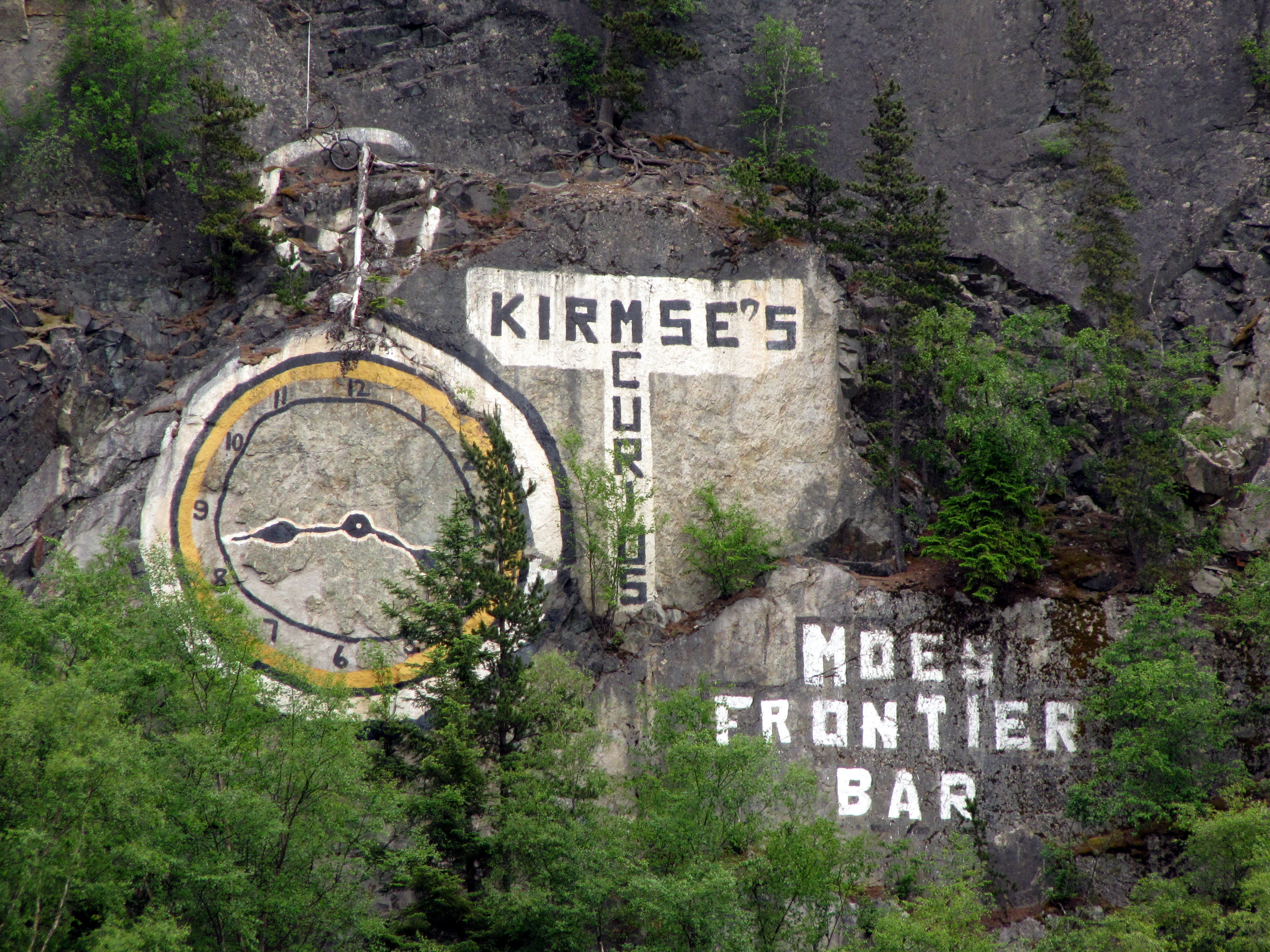
Gold Rush-era advertisements made on one of the mountains forming the eastern wall of the valley

The Klondike gold rush changed everything. In 1896, gold was found in the Klondike region of Canada's Yukon Territory. On July 29, 1897, the steamer Queen docked at Moore's wharf with the first boat load of prospectors. More ships brought thousands of hopeful miners into the new town and prepared for the 500-mile (800 km) journey to the gold fields in Canada. Moore was overrun by lot jumping prospectors and had his land stolen from him and sold to others.

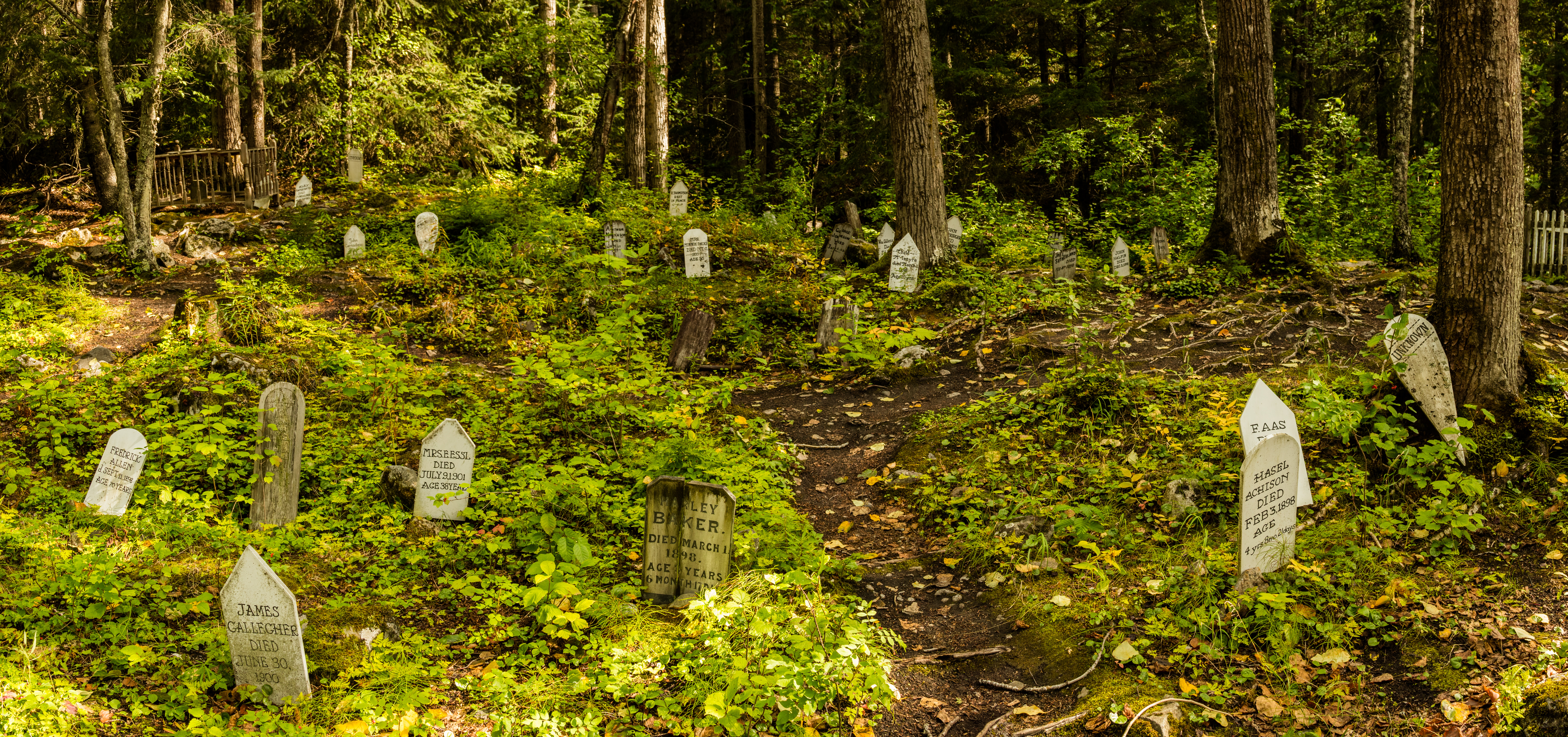
Gold Rush Cemetery

The population of the general area increased enormously and reached 30,000, composed largely of American prospectors. Some realized how difficult the trek ahead would be en route to the gold fields, and chose to stay behind to supply goods and services to miners. Within weeks, stores, saloons, and offices lined the muddy streets of Skagway. The population was estimated at 8,000 residents during the spring of 1898 with approximately 1,000 prospective miners passing through town each week. By June 1898, with a population between 8,000 and 10,000, Skagway was the largest city in Alaska.

Due to the sudden influx of visitors to Skagway, some town residents began offering miners transportation services to aid them in their journeys to the Yukon, often at highly inflated rates. A group of miners upset with the treatment organized a town council to help protect their interests. But as the members of the council moved north to try their own hands at mining, control of the town reverted to the more unscrupulous, most notably Jefferson Randolph "Soapy" Smith.

Jeff. Smith's Parlor, Soapy's base of operations

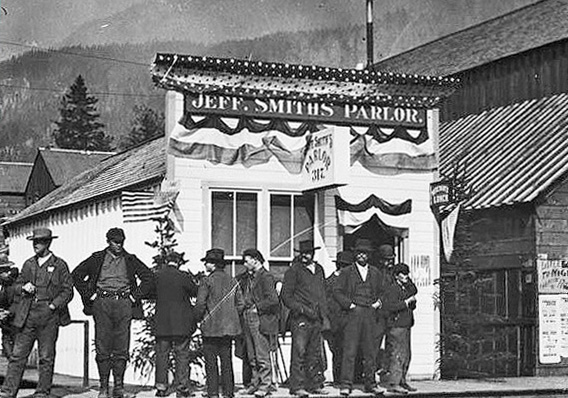
1898, during the Klondike gold rush

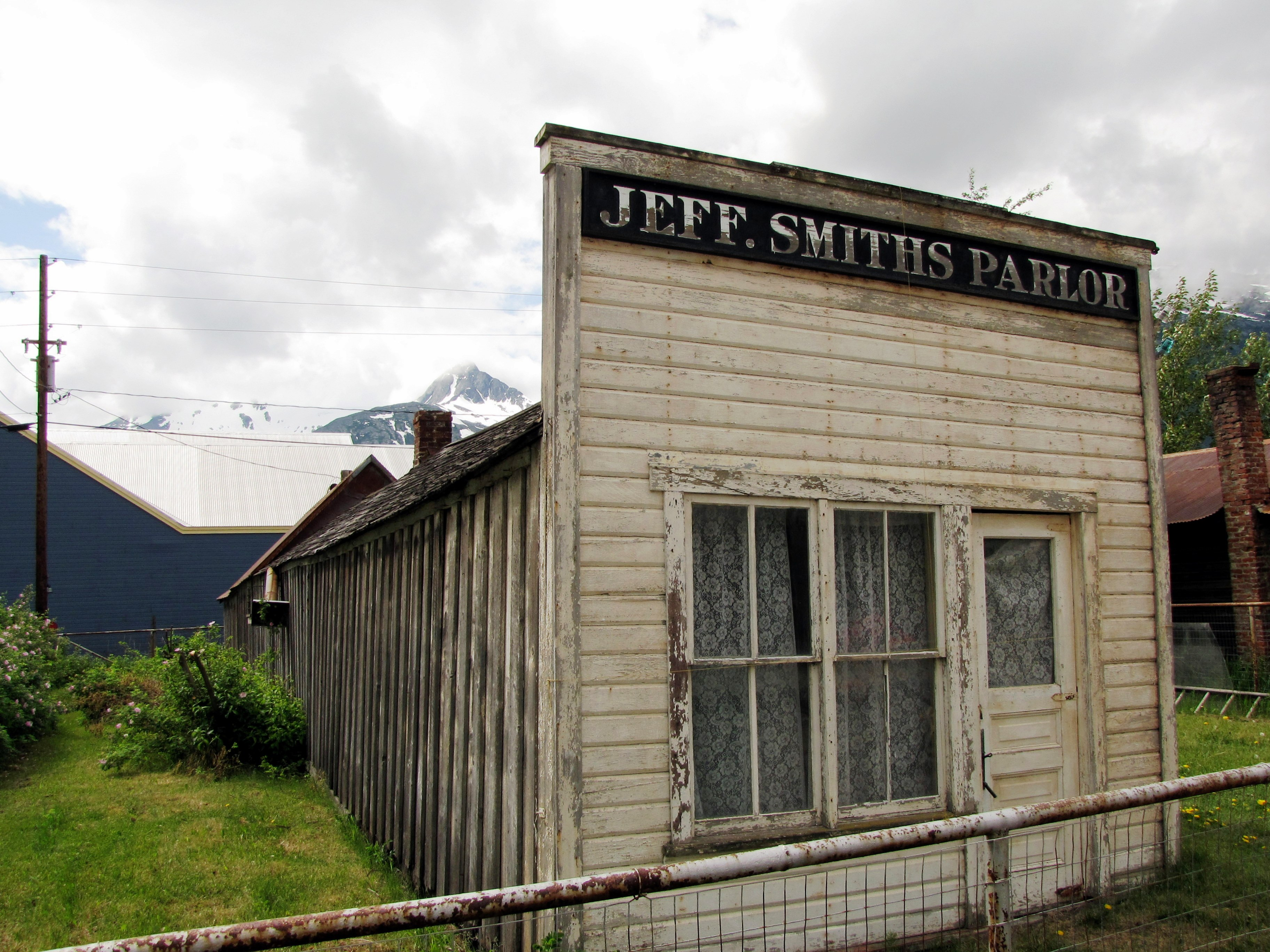
2009, before restoration

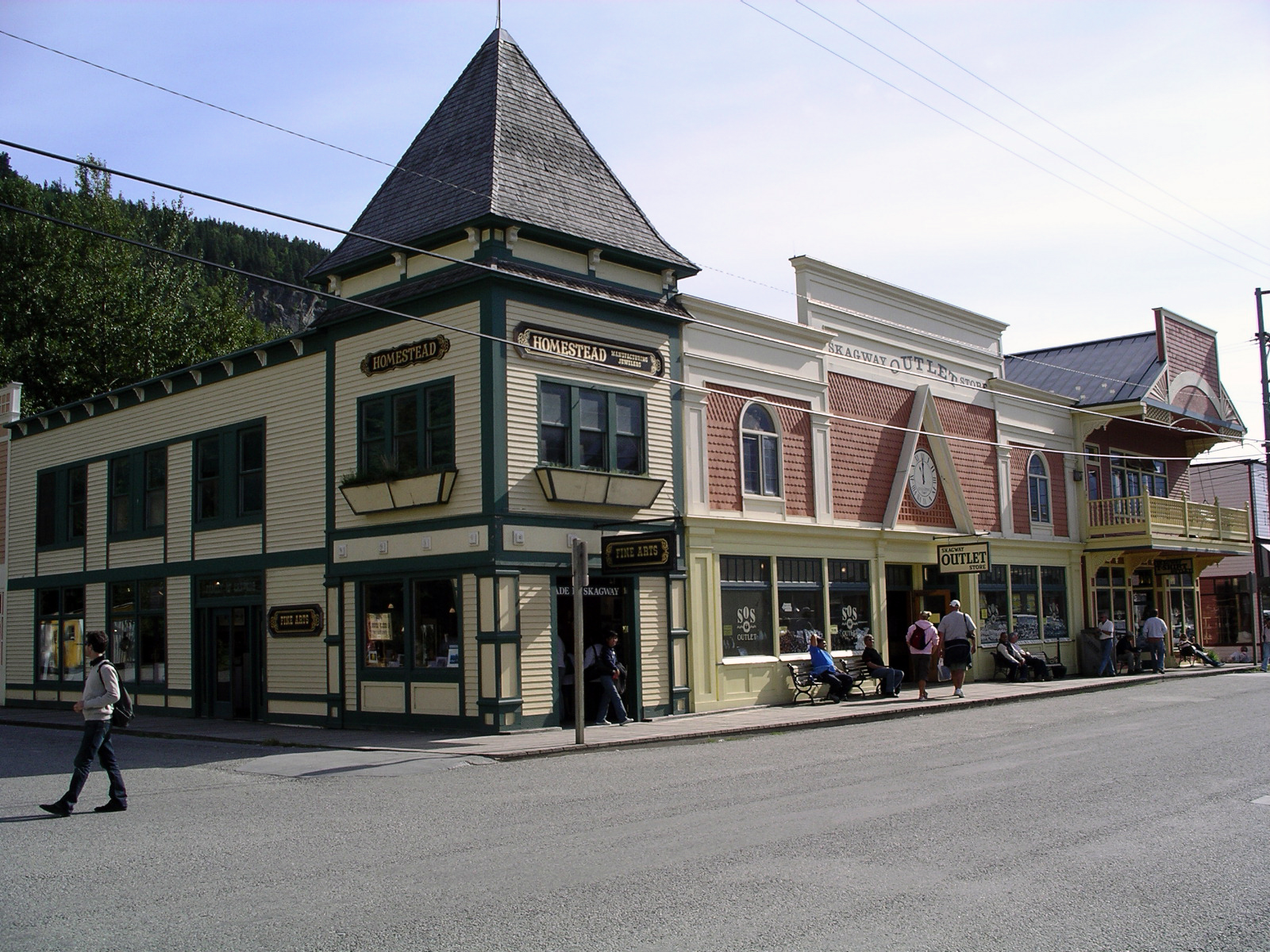
Corner of Broadway and 7th Avenue, built 2005

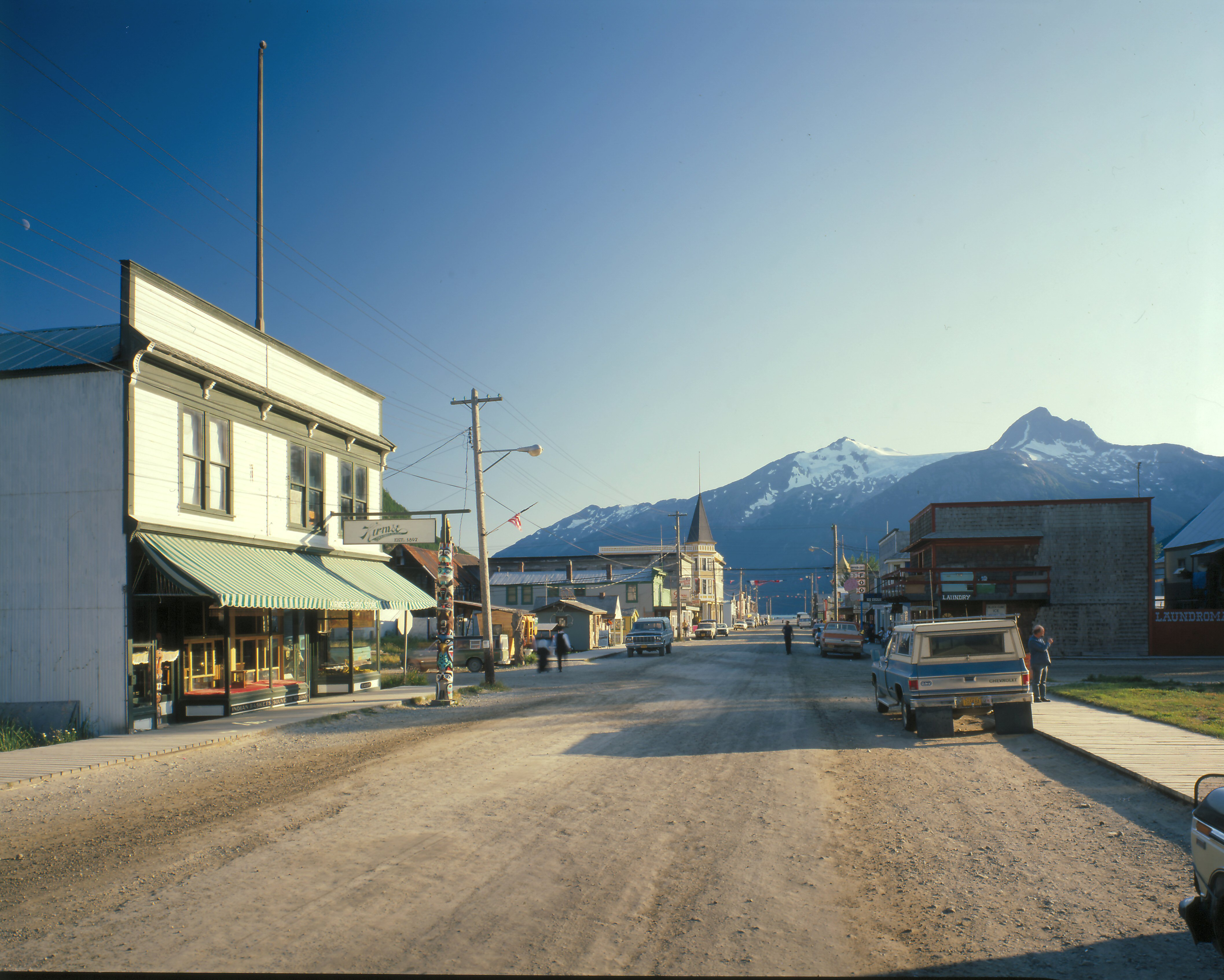
Broadway Avenue, Skagway, in the early 1980s. Mount Harding on right

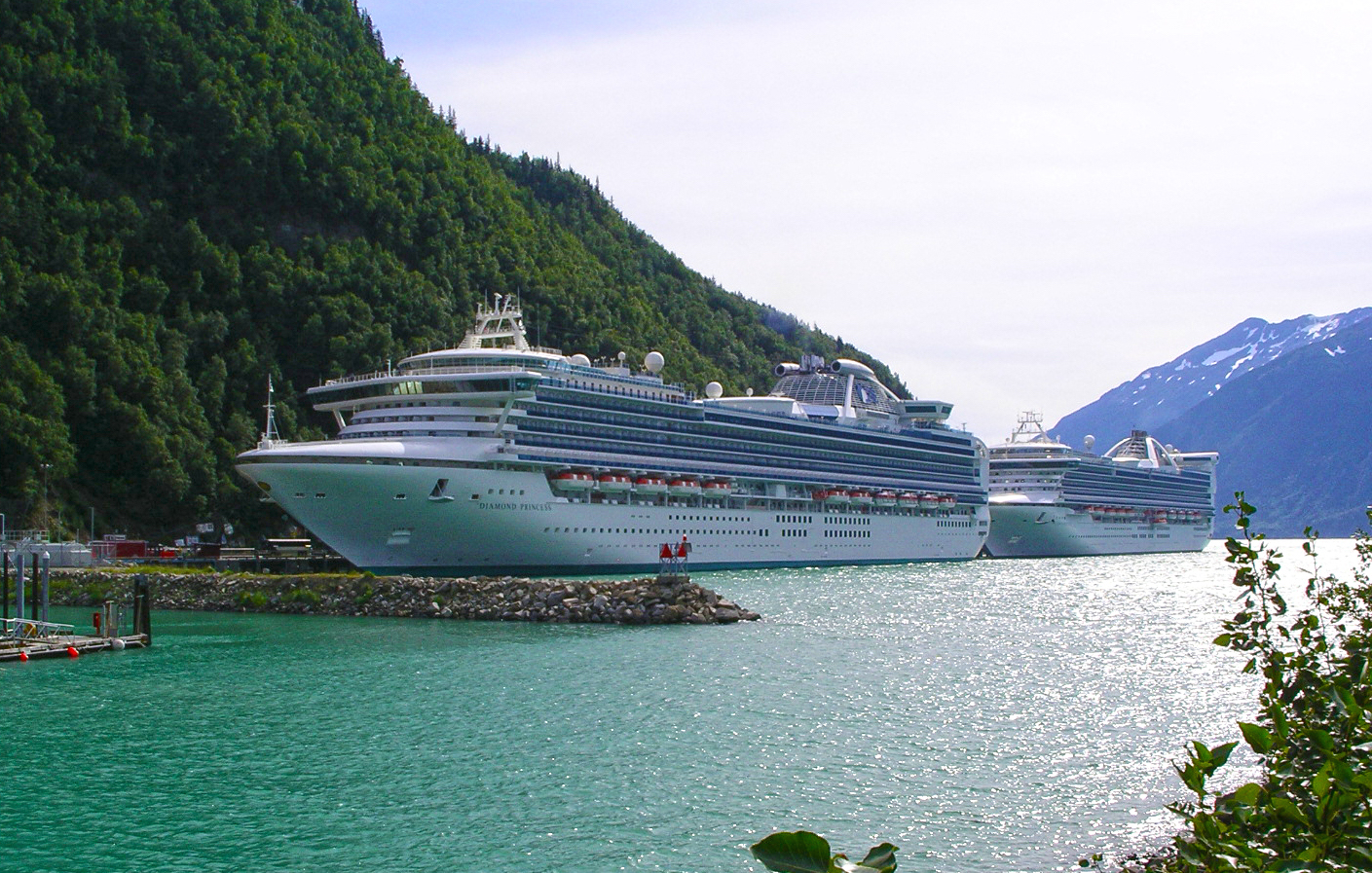
Diamond Princess (left) and Pacific Princess

Between 1897 and 1898, Skagway was a lawless town, described by one member of the North-West Mounted Police as "little better than a hell on earth." Fights, prostitutes and liquor were ever-present on Skagway's streets, and con man "Soapy" Smith, who had risen to considerable power, did little to stop it. Smith was a sophisticated swindler who liked to think of himself as a kind and generous benefactor to the needy. He was gracious to some, giving money to widows and halting lynchings, while simultaneously operating a ring of thieves who swindled prospectors with cards, dice, and the shell game. His telegraph office charged five dollars to send a message anywhere in the world. Consequently, unknowing prospectors sent news to their families back home without realizing there was no telegraph service to or from Skagway until 1901.

Smith also controlled a comprehensive spy network, a private militia called the Skaguay Military Company, the town newspaper, the Deputy U.S. Marshal's office and an array of thieves and con men who roamed about the town. Smith was finally shot and killed by Frank Reid and Jesse Murphy on July 8, 1898, in the famed Shootout on Juneau Wharf. Smith managed to return fire — some accounts claim the two men fired their weapons simultaneously — and Frank Reid died from his wounds twelve days later. Jesse Murphy is believed by some to be responsible for killing Smith, but the official coroner's inquest ruled "that said Smith [died] by reason of pistol wound piercing the heart. The said wound was the result of a pistol shot fired by one Frank H. Reid."

Smith and Reid are now interred at the Klondike Gold Rush Cemetery, also known as "Skagway's Boot Hill."

The prospectors' journey began for many when they climbed the mountains over the White Pass above Skagway and onward across the Canada–US border to Bennett Lake, or one of its neighboring lakes, where they built barges and floated down the Yukon River to the gold fields around Dawson City. Others disembarked at nearby Dyea, northwest of Skagway, and crossed northward on the Chilkoot Pass, an existing Tlingit trade route to reach the lakes. The Dyea route fell out of favor when larger ships began to arrive, as its harbor was too shallow for them except at high tide. Officials in Canada began requiring that each prospector entering Canada on the north side of the White Pass bring with him one ton (909 kg) of supplies, to ensure that he did not starve during the winter. This placed a large burden on the prospectors and the pack animals climbing the steep pass.

In 1898, a 14-mile (23 km), steam-operated aerial tramway was constructed up the Skagway side of the White Pass, easing the burden of those prospectors who could afford the fee to use it. The Chilkoot Trail tramways also began to operate in the Chilkoot Pass above Dyea. In 1896, before the Klondike gold rush had begun, a group of investors saw an opportunity for a railroad over that route. It was not until May 1898 that the White Pass and Yukon Route began laying narrow gauge railroad tracks in Skagway. The railroad depot was constructed between September and December 1898. This destroyed the viability of Dyea, as Skagway had both the deep-water port and the railroad. Construction of McCabe College, the first school in Alaska to offer a college preparatory high school curriculum, began in 1899. The school was completed in 1900.

By 1899, the stream of gold-seekers had diminished and Skagway's economy began to collapse. By 1900, when the railroad was completed, the gold rush was nearly over. In 1900, Skagway was incorporated as the first city in the Alaska Territory. Much of the history of Skagway was saved by early residents such as Martin Itjen, who ran a tour bus around the historical town. He was responsible for saving and maintaining the gold-rush cemetery from complete loss. He purchased Soapy Smith's saloon (Jeff Smith's Parlor) from going the way of the wrecking ball, and placed many artifacts of the city's early history inside and opened Skagway's first museum.

In July 1923, President Warren G. Harding visited Skagway while on his historic tour through Alaska. Harding was the first President of the United States to travel and tour Alaska while in office. The Canol pipeline was extended to Skagway in the 1940s where oil was shipped in by sea and pumped north.

== Geography ==
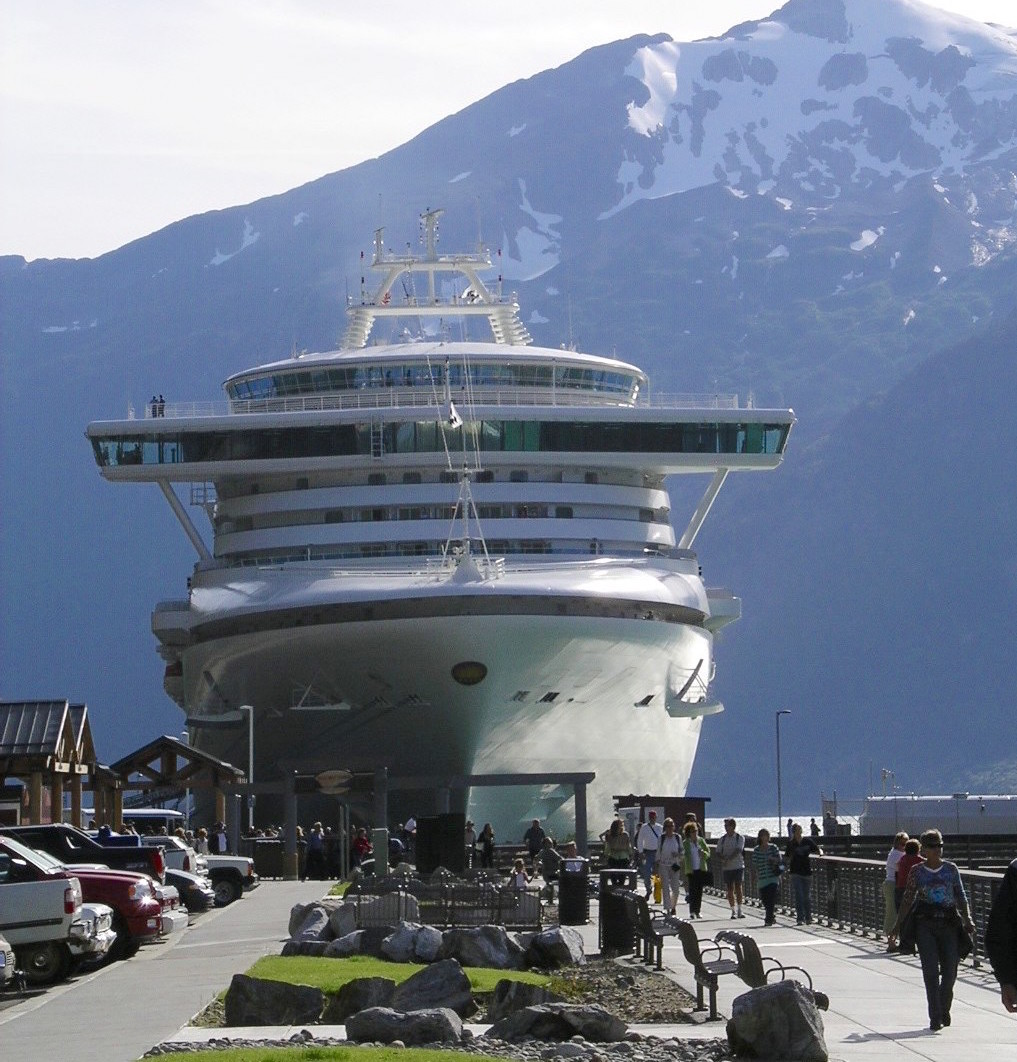
A cruise ship docked in Skagway

Skagway is located at 59°28′7″N 135°18′21″W (59.468519, −135.305962).

Skagway is located in a narrow glaciated valley at the head of the Taiya Inlet, the north end of the Lynn Canal, which is the most northern fjord on the Inside Passage on the south coast of Alaska. It is in the Alaska panhandle 90 miles (140 km) northwest of Juneau, Alaska's capital city.

According to the U.S. Census Bureau, the borough has a total area of 464 square miles (1,200 km^{2}), of which 452 square miles (1,170 km^{2}) is land and 12 square miles (31 km^{2}) (2.5%) is water. It is currently the smallest borough in Alaska, having taken the title away from Bristol Bay Borough at its creation.

=== Adjacent boroughs ===
- Haines Borough, Alaska – south, west
- Stikine Region, British Columbia – north, east

=== National protected areas ===
- Klondike Gold Rush National Historical Park (part, also in Seattle, Washington)
- Tongass National Forest (part)

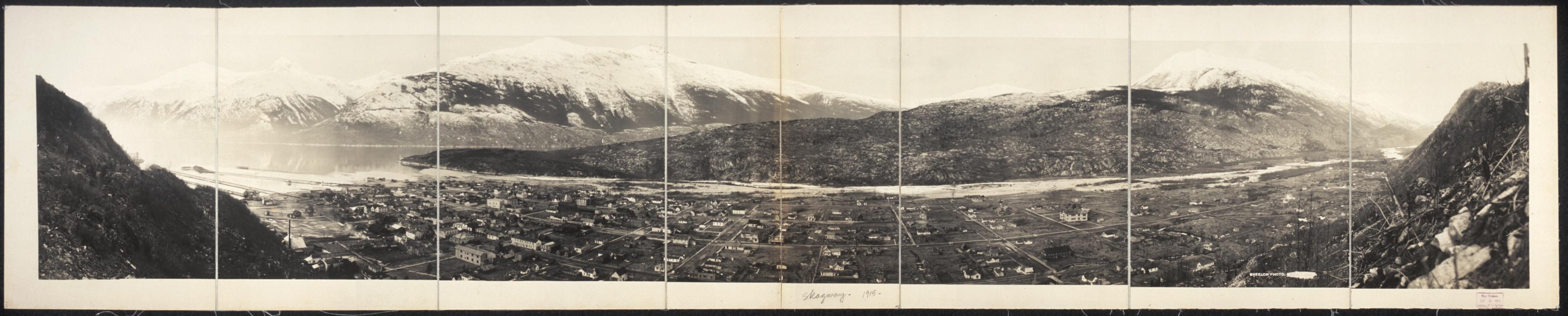
Panoramic photograph of Skagway, c. 1915

=== Climate ===
Skagway has a humid continental climate (Köppen Dsb). It is in the rain shadow of the coastal mountains, and though not as pronounced as the rain shadow in Southcentral Alaska in the valley of the Susitna River, this still allows it to receive only half as much precipitation as Juneau and only a sixth as much as Yakutat. Although winters are too cold for the classification, precipitation patterns resemble a mediterranean climate due to the summer precipitation minimum. The highest temperature recorded in Skagway is 92 °F or 33.3 °C in three separate years, most recently in 2019, and the lowest is −24 °F or −31.1 °C on February 2, 1947.

North winds prevail at Skagway from November to March. South winds prevail from April to October.

Climate data for Skagway, Alaska, 1991–2020 normals, extremes 1898–present
Month	Jan	Feb	Mar	Apr	May	Jun	Jul	Aug	Sep	Oct	Nov	Dec	Year
Record high °F (°C)	55 (13)	55 (13)	63 (17)	76 (24)	82 (28)	90 (32)	92 (33)	92 (33)	83 (28)	68 (20)	56 (13)	57 (14)	92 (33)
Mean maximum °F (°C)	45.8 (7.7)	46.1 (7.8)	50.5 (10.3)	62.5 (16.9)	73.4 (23.0)	79.0 (26.1)	77.8 (25.4)	77.0 (25.0)	67.1 (19.5)	56.6 (13.7)	47.3 (8.5)	45.3 (7.4)	82.3 (27.9)
Mean daily maximum °F (°C)	29.2 (−1.6)	32.8 (0.4)	38.3 (3.5)	50.4 (10.2)	60.6 (15.9)	66.3 (19.1)	67.1 (19.5)	65.0 (18.3)	56.9 (13.8)	47.3 (8.5)	36.5 (2.5)	31.5 (−0.3)	48.5 (9.2)
Daily mean °F (°C)	24.7 (−4.1)	27.5 (−2.5)	31.6 (−0.2)	41.2 (5.1)	50.4 (10.2)	57.1 (13.9)	59.1 (15.1)	57.4 (14.1)	50.4 (10.2)	41.8 (5.4)	31.8 (−0.1)	27.5 (−2.5)	41.7 (5.4)
Mean daily minimum °F (°C)	20.2 (−6.6)	22.2 (−5.4)	24.9 (−3.9)	32.0 (0.0)	40.1 (4.5)	47.7 (8.7)	51.1 (10.6)	49.7 (9.8)	44.0 (6.7)	36.2 (2.3)	27.1 (−2.7)	23.5 (−4.7)	34.9 (1.6)
Mean minimum °F (°C)	4.0 (−15.6)	9.3 (−12.6)	14.0 (−10.0)	25.6 (−3.6)	33.8 (1.0)	41.4 (5.2)	46.2 (7.9)	43.9 (6.6)	35.1 (1.7)	27.7 (−2.4)	16.3 (−8.7)	9.3 (−12.6)	−0.3 (−17.9)
Record low °F (°C)	−21 (−29)	−24 (−31)	−10 (−23)	7 (−14)	22 (−6)	25 (−4)	35 (2)	24 (−4)	20 (−7)	8 (−13)	−6 (−21)	−22 (−30)	−24 (−31)
Average precipitation inches (mm)	2.65 (67)	1.98 (50)	1.98 (50)	1.67 (42)	1.14 (29)	1.42 (36)	1.62 (41)	2.65 (67)	4.51 (115)	4.42 (112)	3.42 (87)	4.02 (102)	31.48 (798)
Average snowfall inches (cm)	9.2 (23)	8.1 (21)	8.6 (22)	1.5 (3.8)	0.0 (0.0)	0.0 (0.0)	0.0 (0.0)	0.0 (0.0)	0.0 (0.0)	1.1 (2.8)	5.9 (15)	10.5 (27)	44.9 (114.6)
Average precipitation days (≥ 0.01 in)	13.8	10.5	9.5	11.5	9.0	11.2	12.2	14.9	17.4	18.2	13.6	13.1	154.9
Average snowy days (≥ 0.1 in)	7.4	4.8	4.2	0.9	0.0	0.0	0.0	0.0	0.0	0.3	3.3	6.6	27.5
Source: NOAA

== Demographics ==
Historical population
Census	Pop.	Note	%±
1900	3,117		—
1910	872		−72.0%
1920	494		−43.3%
1930	492		−0.4%
1940	634		28.9%
1950	758		19.6%
1960	659		−13.1%
1970	675		2.4%
1980	768		13.8%
1990	692		−9.9%
2000	862		24.6%
2010	968		12.3%
2020	1,164		20.2%
2025 (est.)	1,104	▼	−5.2%
U.S. Decennial Census

Skagway first appeared on the 1900 U.S. Census, having incorporated as a city that same year. It was the 2nd largest city in Alaska, behind fellow Gold Rush boomtown Nome. It reported 3,117 residents, of which 2,845 were White, 113 were Native Americans, 98 were Black and 61 were Asian. It rapidly declined to 872 residents by 1910, falling to the 8th largest city. It reported 802 Whites, 61 Native Americans and 9 Others. It would be 90 years (until 2000) before it would almost reach that population again (862). It fell to 15th largest community overall in 1920. By 1930, it bottomed out at 492 residents, although it rose to 13th largest in the state. In 1940, it fell to 16th. By 1950, 19th. 1960, it tied for 29th place (16th largest incorporated). In 1970, it dropped to 45th (24th largest incorporated). In 1980, it rose to 35th place. In 1990, it fell to 53rd place. In 2000, it was at 60th place overall (29th largest incorporated). In 2007, with the creation of the Skagway Municipality out of Skagway-Hoonah-Angoon, it ceased to be an incorporated city and became a census-designated place (CDP). As of 2010, it is the 71st largest community in Alaska.

=== 2020 census ===
Skagway Municipality, Alaska – Racial and ethnic composition Note: the US Census treats Hispanic/Latino as an ethnic category. This table excludes Latinos from the racial categories and assigns them to a separate category. Hispanics/Latinos may be of any race.
Race / Ethnicity (NH = Non-Hispanic)	Pop 2010	Pop 2020	% 2010	% 2020
White alone (NH)	872	1,056	90.08%	85.16%
Black or African American alone (NH)	0	6	0.00%	0.48%
Native American or Alaska Native alone (NH)	34	23	3.51%	1.85%
Asian alone (NH)	5	39	0.52%	3.15%
Native Hawaiian or Pacific Islander alone (NH)	1	0	0.10%	0.00%
Other race alone (NH)	0	6	0.00%	0.48%
Mixed race or Multiracial (NH)	35	69	3.62%	5.56%
Hispanic or Latino (any race)	21	41	2.17%	3.31%
Total	968	1,240	100.00%	100.00%

As of the 2020 census, the county had a population of 1,240. The median age was 40.7 years. 19.9% of residents were under the age of 18 and 13.5% of residents were 65 years of age or older. For every 100 females there were 105.6 males, and for every 100 females age 18 and over there were 105.6 males age 18 and over.

The racial makeup of the county was 86.3% White, 0.8% Black or African American, 2.6% American Indian and Alaska Native, 3.1% Asian, 0.0% Native Hawaiian and Pacific Islander, 0.7% from some other race, and 6.5% from two or more races. Hispanic or Latino residents of any race comprised 3.3% of the population.

0.0% of residents lived in urban areas, while 100.0% lived in rural areas.

There were 531 households in the county, of which 32.0% had children under the age of 18 living with them and 21.3% had a female householder with no spouse or partner present. About 29.0% of all households were made up of individuals and 8.3% had someone living alone who was 65 years of age or older.

There were 760 housing units, of which 30.1% were vacant. Among occupied housing units, 55.9% were owner-occupied and 44.1% were renter-occupied. The homeowner vacancy rate was 0.0% and the rental vacancy rate was 14.7%.

=== 2000 census ===
As of the census of 2000, there were 862 people, 401 households, and 214 families residing in the city. The population density was 1.9 people per square mile (0.73 people/km^{2}). There were 502 housing units at an average density of 1.1 per square mile (0.42/km^{2}). The racial makeup of the city was 92.3% White, 3.0% Native American, 0.6% Asian, 0.2% Pacific Islander, 0.8% from other races, and 3.0% from two or more races. 2.1% of the population were Hispanic or Latino of any race.

There were 401 households, out of which 23.2% had children under the age of 18 living with them, 46.9% were married couples living together, 4.7% had a female householder with no husband present, and 46.4% were non-families. 36.2% of all households were made up of individuals, and 6.7% had someone living alone who was 65 years of age or older. The average household size was 2.15 and the average family size was 2.81.

In the city, the population was distributed with 20.5% under the age of 18, 5.2% from 18 to 24, 34.6% from 25 to 44, 31.2% from 45 to 64, and 8.5% who were 65 years of age or older. The median age was 40 years old. For every 100 females, there were 109.2 males. For every 100 females age 18 and over, there were 112.7 males.

== Government and politics ==
United States presidential election results for Skagway, Alaska
Year	Republican		Democratic		Third party(ies)	
Year	No.	%	No.	%	No.	%
1960	100	31.15%	221	68.85%	0	0.00%
1964	75	22.32%	261	77.68%	0	0.00%
1968	155	57.41%	95	35.19%	20	7.41%
1972	236	68.01%	90	25.94%	21	6.05%
1976	230	67.45%	99	29.03%	12	3.52%
1980	185	48.18%	128	33.33%	71	18.49%
1984	215	59.39%	132	36.46%	15	4.14%
1988	205	55.11%	155	41.67%	12	3.23%
1992	178	37.32%	154	32.29%	145	30.40%
1996	163	36.30%	179	39.87%	107	23.83%
2000	247	49.90%	156	31.52%	92	18.59%
2004	165	41.15%	207	51.62%	29	7.23%
2008	217	38.07%	317	55.61%	36	6.32%
2012	188	30.67%	356	58.08%	69	11.26%
2016	232	27.65%	449	53.52%	158	18.83%
2020	217	22.75%	679	71.17%	58	6.08%
2024	265	25.63%	717	69.34%	52	5.03%

Skagway has voted Democratic in every presidential election since 2004; further, it is one of the most Democratic boroughs in the state.

== Economy ==
=== Personal income ===
The median income for a household in the city was $49,375, and the median income for a family was $62,188. Males had a median income of $44,583 versus $30,956 for females. The per capita income for the city was $27,700. About 1.0% of families and 3.7% of the population were below the poverty line, including none of those under age 18 and 4.5% of those age 65 or over.

=== Tourism ===
Tourism is Skagway's largest sector of the economy. In 2025, Skagway had 2,025,841 tourists visit, most of whom (1.3 million) came on cruise ships. These guests support the large tourism operations business in town existing primarily to serve cruise ship passengers.

Visitors come for the Alaska's natural scenery, including plentiful outdoor opportunities, such as the White Pass and Chilkoot Trails as well as the cultural history of the Klondike Gold Rush National Historical Park. The historical district includes about 100 buildings from the gold rush era.

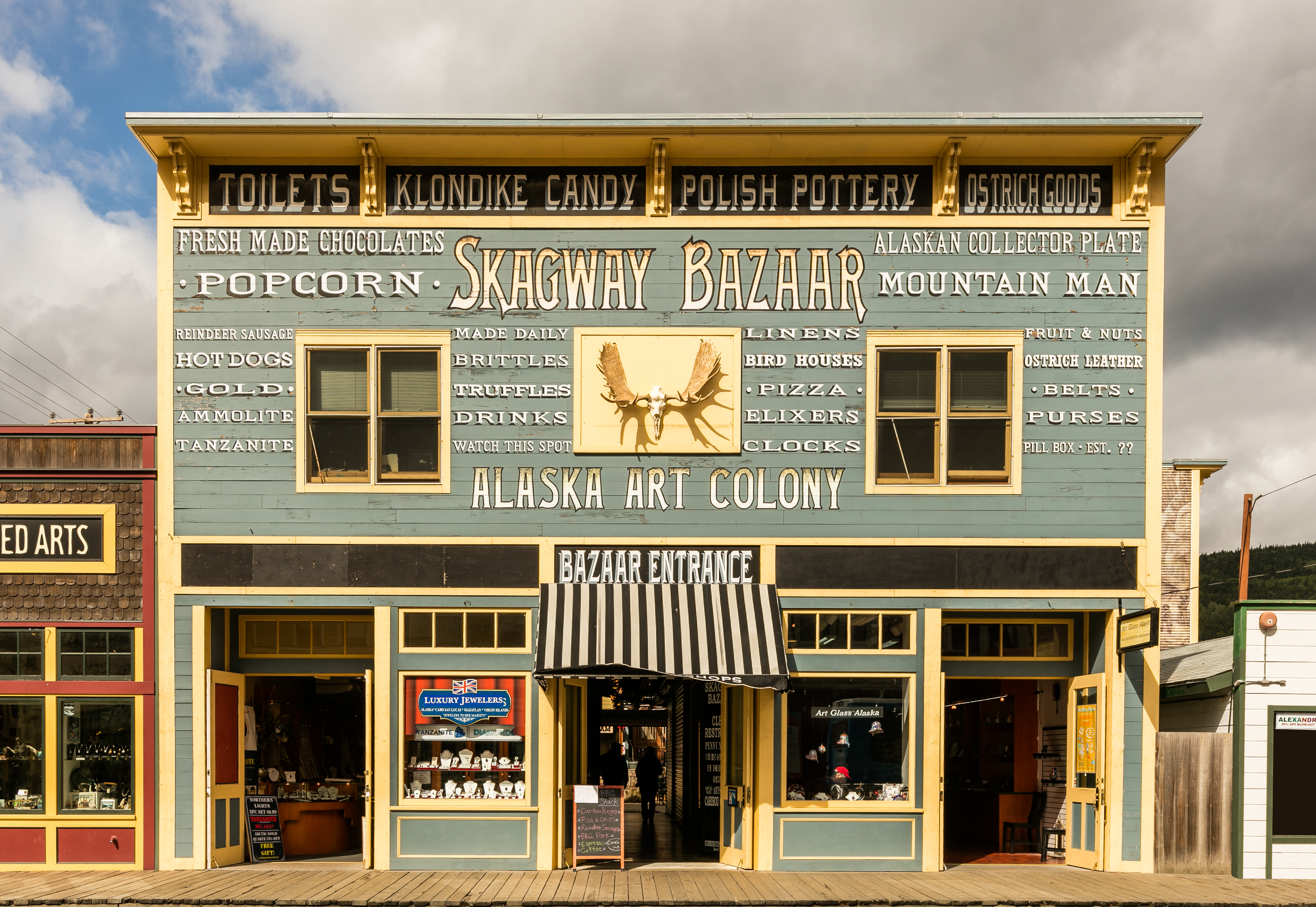
Wooden building in the historic center of Skagway.

Popular activities include hiking, helicopter tours, dog sledding, ocean rafting, ziplining, horseback riding, and Yukon excursions.

The White Pass and Yukon Route is the most popular cruise ship excursion in Skagway, carrying almost half a million guests each year. The WPYR operates its narrow-gauge train around Skagway during the summer months, primarily for tourists but also ships copper ore from the interior. Other popular tour operators include AlaskaX, Temsco Helicopters, Sockeye Cycle, Alaska Mountain Guides, and more.

Downtown Skagway also attracts visitors with its historic district, including The Days of '98 Show is performed in Skagway's Fraternal Order of Eagles Hall.

== Transportation ==
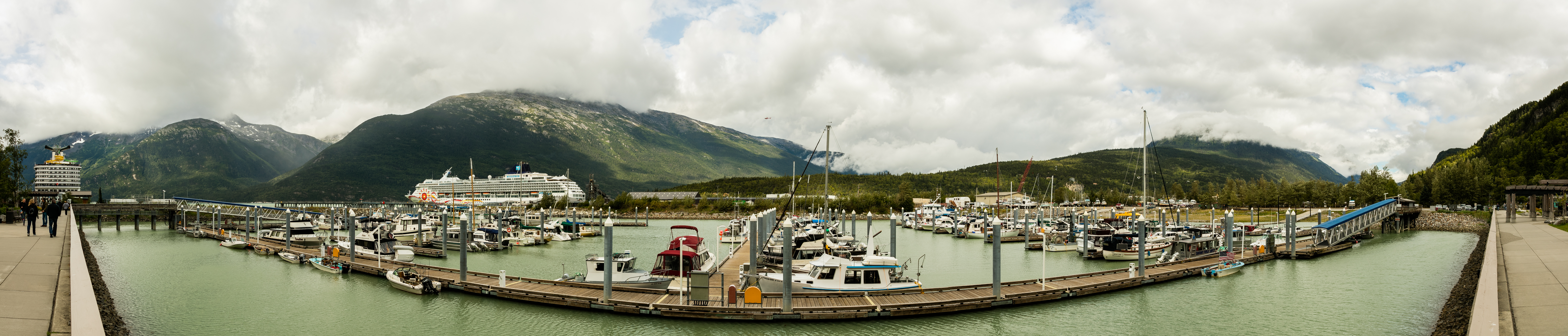
The port of Skagway provides sea access to cruise ships and ferries.

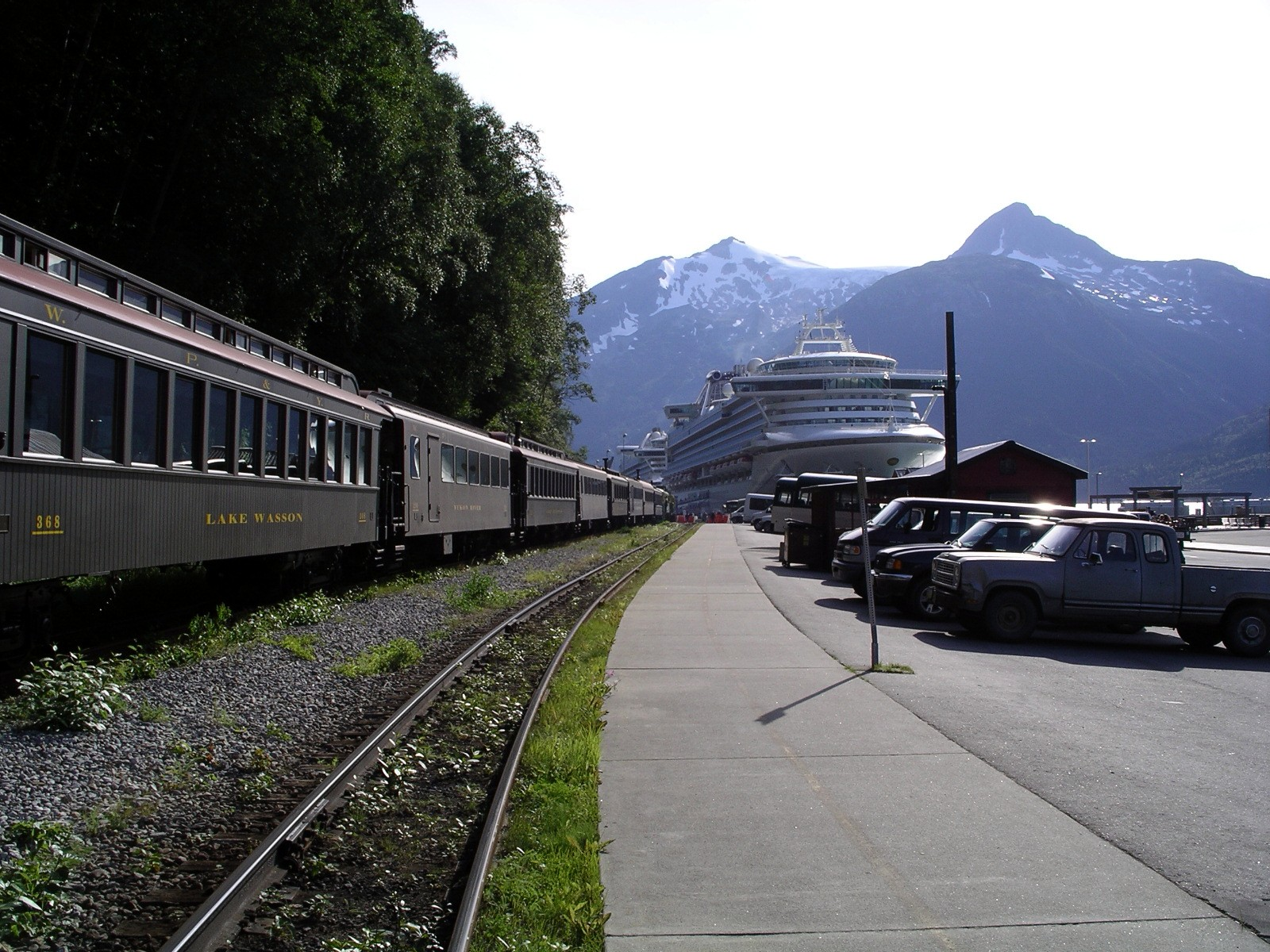
A tourist train arriving in Skagway at the cruise ship dock

Skagway is one of three Southeast Alaskan communities that are connected to the road system; Skagway's connection is via the Klondike Highway, completed in 1978. This allows access to the lower 48, Whitehorse, Yukon, northern British Columbia, and the Alaska Highway. This also makes Skagway an important port-of-call for the Alaska Marine Highway — Alaska's ferry system — and serves as the northern terminus of the important and heavily used Lynn Canal corridor. (The other Southeast Alaskan communities with road access are Haines and Hyder.)

The White Pass and Yukon Route is a railway that formerly linked Whitehorse, Yukon in Canada to Skagway, the railway's southernmost terminus. Today, trains travel several times a week from May through September from Skagway to the small community of Carcross, approximately 45 miles (72 km) south/southwest of Whitehorse. There, passengers (mostly tourists) can make connections via bus to Whitehorse.

Current services at White Pass Summit station
Preceding station	White Pass and Yukon Route	Following station
Terminus	Bennett Scenic Journey	White Pass Summit toward Carcross
Terminus	Steam Excursion	White Pass Summit toward Bennett
Terminus	White Pass Summit Excursion	White Pass Summit Terminus
Terminus	Skagway To Denver Round Trip	Denver Terminus
Terminus	Skagway To Laughton Round Trip	Denver toward Laughton

Skagway Airport receives service the city with commercial airline service on:Alaska Seaplanes (not to be confused with Alaska Airlines).

== Media ==
=== Local radio and newspapers ===
Skagway is served by its local semimonthly newspaper, The Skagway News, as well as regional public radio station KHNS, which has its principal studios in nearby Haines but also has studios and programs based in Skagway. Juneau radio station KINY operates a translator in Skagway which serves the entire town.

Skagway also receives copies of the free regional newspaper Capital City Weekly.

=== Featured in media ===
Skagway and the surrounding goldfields in 1897–1898 is the main setting for George Markstein's 1978 novel 'Tara Kane′, which also features fictionalised versions of Jefferson 'Soapy' Smith and his gang, along with photographer Eric A. Hegg (called Ernst Hart in the novel).

In the Three Stooges short In the Sweet Pie and Pie, Skagway receives a humorous mention: "Edam Neckties, with three convenient locations: Skagway, Alaska; Little America; and Pago Pago."

Skagway is a featured setting in the 1946 film Road to Utopia, starring Bob Hope and Bing Crosby.

In Jack London's short story "The Unexpected," the main characters spend the winter of 1897–1898 in "the mushroom outfitting-town of Skaguay" before moving on to stake a gold-mining claim elsewhere.

Skagway is featured in the 1955 Western The Far Country, directed by Anthony Mann.

Skagway is a town featured in the computer game The Yukon Trail.

Skagway and the surrounding region is a campaign available in a modification of the helicopter combat simulator "Enemy Engaged: Comanche vs. Hokum" (version 1.16.0)

In an episode of Homeland Security USA, the border crossing in Skagway was featured as being the least-used crossing in the United States.

Chief Inspector Fenwick often dryly referred to nearby "big city" "Skagway" when sending his mounty, Dudley Do-Right, to capture the show's evil nemesis, Snidely Whiplash.

Skagway's Mo Mountain Mutts came to prominence in 2023, when its "puppy bus" video went viral.

== Health care ==
Skagway is served by Dahl Memorial Clinic, the only primary health clinic in the area. The facility is usually staffed by three advanced nurse practitioners and three medical assistants. It is open Monday through Friday year-round with limited Saturday hours during summer. The clinic also operates after hours in emergency situations. The borough is also served 24/7 by local EMS. Individuals in need of dire medical attention are transported by air via helicopter or air ambulance to Bartlett Regional Hospital in Juneau (an approximately 45-minute flight). Whitehorse General Hospital in Whitehorse, Yukon is the nearest hospital to Skagway that is accessible by road (approximately a two-hour drive).
