= Face Mountain =

Mountain in Alaska, United States

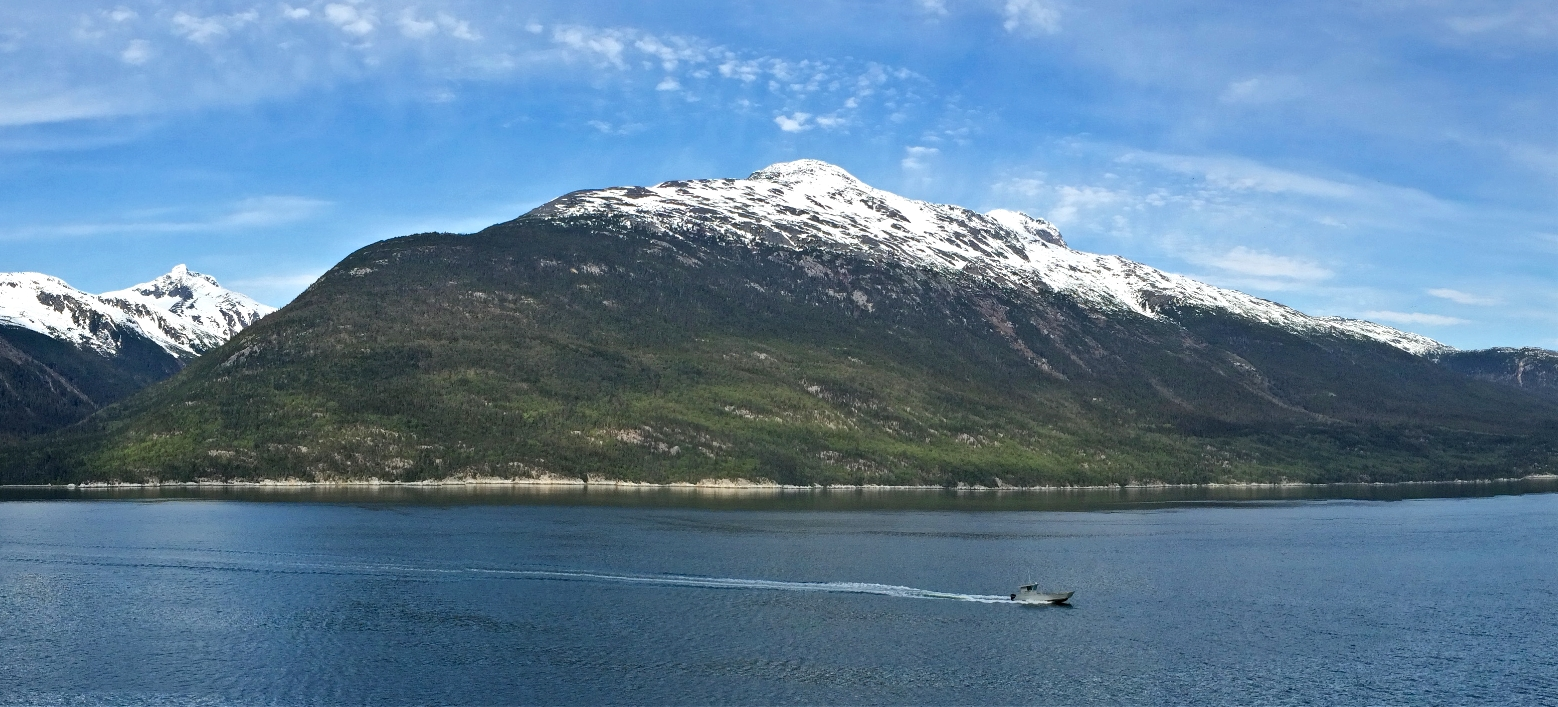
- Southeast aspect of Face Mountain

Highest point
- Elevation: 5,052 ft (1,540 m)
- Prominence: 580 ft (180 m)
- Isolation: 1.36 mi (2.19 km)
- Coordinates: 59°28′40″N 135°25′45″W

Geography
- Location within Alaska
- Interactive map of Face Mountain
- Country: United States
- State: Alaska
- Borough: Skagway
- Parent range: Coast Mountains; Boundary Ranges
- Topo map: USGS Skagway B-2

Climbing
- Easiest route: Scrambling

Face Mountain is a 5,052 ft (1,540 m) mountain summit located in the Boundary Ranges of the Coast Mountains, in the U.S. state of Alaska. The peak is situated 4.2 mi (7 km) west-northwest of Skagway, and 4.3 mi (7 km) north of Mount Harding. Although modest in elevation, relief is significant since Face Mountain rises above tidewater of Taiya Inlet in less than 2.5 miles (4 kilometres). This geographic feature was named "Parsons Peak" in 1897 by the United States Coast and Geodetic Survey, and has had variant names "Gnome Mountain", and "The Sphinx" used locally to describe a face in the rock. The mountain's present name and summit location was officially adopted in 1985 by the U.S. Board on Geographic Names, however USGS maps still show the old name, Parsons Peak, as the summit. Precipitation runoff from the mountain drains into tributaries of Taiya Inlet.

== Climate ==
Based on the Köppen climate classification, Face Mountain has a subarctic climate with cold, snowy winters, and cool summers. Weather systems coming off the Gulf of Alaska are forced upwards by the Coast Mountains (orographic lift), causing heavy precipitation in the form of rainfall and snowfall. Winter temperatures can drop below −20 °C with wind chill factors below −30 °C. This climate supports a glacier north of the summit. The months May through July offer the most favorable weather for viewing or climbing Face Mountain.

== Gallery ==
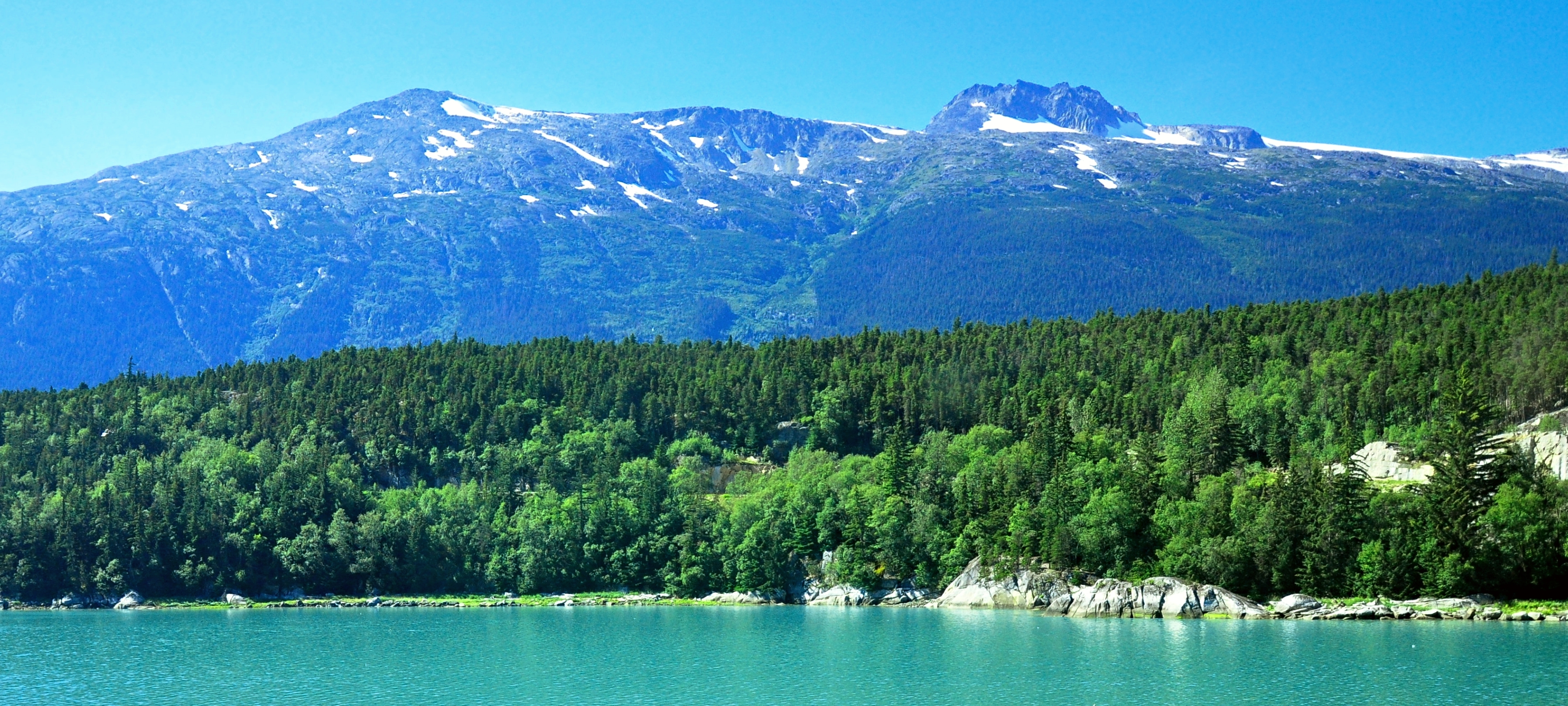
Face Mountain with the "face" to right (formerly Parsons Peak)

== See also ==
- List of mountain peaks of Alaska
- Geography of Alaska
- Etymology and the Mythical Stone Woman
